= Aberdeen City Council elections =

Local government elections in Aberdeen, Scotland

Aberdeen City Council in Scotland holds elections every five years, previously holding them every four years from its creation in 1995 to 2007.

== Council elections ==
=== As a district council ===
Year	SNP	Labour	Conservative	Liberal (Note: SDP–Liberal Alliance from 1981 to 1988, Liberal Democrats from 1988.)	Independent
1974	0	29	17	2	0
1977	2	22	16	7	1
1980	0	27	13	8	0
1984 (Note: New ward boundaries.)	0	28	8	14	0
1988 (Note: Some new ward boundaries.)	1	28	9	14	0
1992	2	27	10	13	0

=== As a unitary authority ===
Year	SNP	Labour	Conservative	Liberal Democrats	Independent
1995	1	30	9	10	0
1999 (Note: New ward boundaries.)	3	22	6	12	0
2003	6	14	3	20	0
2007 (Note: Change to single transferable vote system and new ward boundaries.)	12	10	5	15	1
2012	15	17	3	5	3
2017 (Note: New ward boundaries.)	19	9	11	4	2
2022	20	11	8	4	2

== Results maps ==
1974 results map

1977 results map

1980 results map

1984 results map

1988 results map

1992 results map

1995 results map

1999 results map

2003 results map

2007 results map

2012 results map

2017 results map

2022 results map

== By-elections ==
=== 2003-2007 ===
Queens Cross By-Election 1 April 2004
Party	Candidate	Votes	%	±%
Conservative		669	46.8	+2.6
Liberal Democrats		611	42.8	+6.8
Labour		63	4.4	−6.3
SNP		51	3.6	−5.5
Scottish Socialist		25	1.8	+1.8
National Front		9	0.6	+0.6
Majority		58	4.1	
Turnout		1,428		
Conservative hold		Swing		

=== 2007-2012 ===
Midstocket/Rosemount By-Election 16 August 2007
Party	Candidate	FPv%	Count		
Party	Candidate	FPv%	1	2	3
SNP	John Corall	29.5	873	984	1,258
Conservative	Fraser Forsyth	27.8	821	873	1,122
Liberal Democrats	Steve Delaney	23.4	693	869	
Labour	Allan McIntosh	17.5	518		
Solidarity	Stephen Haddan	1.0	31		
Independent	Dennis Grattan	0.7	20		
SNP gain from Conservative					
Valid: 2,956 Spoilt: 21 Quota: 1,479 Turnout: 2,977

Dyce/Bucksburn/Danestone By-Election 19 May 2011
Party	Candidate	FPv%	Count
Party	Candidate	FPv%	1
SNP	Neil MacGregor	51.4	2,090
Labour	Graeme Lawrence	23.1	941
Liberal Democrats	Kristian Chapman	11.0	446
Conservative	Ross Thomson	8.7	352
Independent	Angela Joss	3.7	150
Green	Rhonda Reekie	2.2	88
SNP gain from Liberal Democrats			
Valid: 4,067 Spoilt: Quota: 2,034

Airyhall/Broomhill/Garthdee By-Election 23 June 2011
Party	Candidate	FPv%	Count							
Party	Candidate	FPv%	1	2	3	4	5	6	7	8
SNP	Gordon Townson	33.2	1,112	1,115	1,120	1,136	1,161	1,263	1,441	1,792
Labour	Angela Taylor	23.3	783	783	784	810	829	956	1,068	
Conservative	Bill Berry	19.4	649	652	654	656	676	801		
Liberal Democrats	Gregor McAbery	16.5	554	558	562	584	599			
Independent	Graham Bennett	2.9	98	99	109	122				
Green	Richie Brian	3.0	101	103	104					
Independent	Hamish Hay Mackay	1.0	32	34						
National Front	Dave Macdonald	0.7	25							
SNP gain from Liberal Democrats										
Electorate: 11,623 Valid: 3,354 Spoilt: 32 Quota: 1,678 Turnout: 3,386

=== 2012-2017 ===
Hilton/Woodside/Stockethill By-Election 30 July 2015
Party	Candidate	FPv%	Count
Party	Candidate	FPv%	1
SNP	Neil Copland	54.5	1,690
Labour	Charlie Pirie	24.9	771
Conservative	Roy Begg	11.3	350
Green	Peter Kennedy	4.2	130
Liberal Democrats	Jonathan Waddell	4.1	125
SNP hold			
Valid: 3,099 Spoilt: 33 Quota: 1,534 Turnout: 3,132

Kincorth/Nigg/Cove By-Election 30 July 2015
Party	Candidate	FPv%	Count
Party	Candidate	FPv%	1
SNP	Stephen Flynn	60.5	1,939
Labour	Donna Clark	18.9	606
Conservative	Philip Sellar	9.8	313
Liberal Democrats	Ken McLeod	6.5	207
Green	Dan Yeats	3.6	114
SNP hold			
Valid: 3,205 Spoilt: 26 Quota: 1,590 Turnout: 3,231

George Street/Harbour By-Election 1 October 2015
Party	Candidate	FPv%	Count
Party	Candidate	FPv%	1
SNP	Michael Hutchison	51.2	961
Labour	Mike Scott	26.1	490
Conservative	Brian Davidson	10.4	195
Green	Alex Jarvis	7.2	136
Liberal Democrats	Euan Davidson	5.1	96
SNP hold			
Valid: 1,878 Spoilt: 20 Quota: 940 Turnout: 1,898

Midstocket/Rosemount By-Election 1 October 2015
Party	Candidate	FPv%	Count			
Party	Candidate	FPv%	1	2	3	4
SNP	Alex Nicoll	40.9	1,168	1,225	1,275	1,433
Conservative	Tom Mason	23.6	672	687	771	927
Labour	Howard Gemmell	21.2	605	629	692	
Liberal Democrats	Ken McLeod	8.3	238	270		
Green	Jennifer Phillips	6.0	170			
SNP gain from Conservative						
Valid: 2,853 Spoilt: 19 Quota: 1,427 Turnout: 2,872

=== 2017-2022 ===
Bridge of Don By-Election 3 October 2019
Party	Candidate	FPv%	Count
Party	Candidate	FPv%	1
Conservative	Sarah Cross	36.2	1,857
SNP	Jessica Mennie	35.0	1,797
Liberal Democrats	Michael Skoczykloda	18.1	929
Labour	Graeme Lawrence	5.9	305
Green	Sylvia Hardie	2.7	140
Independent	Simon McLean	0.8	43
Red Party of Scotland	Max McKay	0.2	9
Conservative hold			
SNP hold			
Valid: 5,135 Spoilt: 66 Quota: 1,712 Turnout: 5,201

Torry/Ferryhill By-Election 21 November 2019
Party	Candidate	FPv%	Count					
Party	Candidate	FPv%	1	2	3	4	5	6
SNP	Audrey Nicoll	43.2	1,618	1,620	1,624	1,673	1,819	1,989
Conservative	Neil Murray	26.0	972	983	996	1,049	1,083	1,151
Labour	Willie Young	10.6	395	396	402	462	533	
Green	Betty Lyon	8.1	304	320	347	429		
Liberal Democrats	Gregor McAbery	8.4	315	320	324			
Independent	Simon McLean	2.3	86	89				
UKIP	Roy Hill	1.4	53					
SNP hold								
Valid: 3,743 Spoilt: 40 Quota: 1,872 Turnout: 3,783

Kincorth/Nigg/Cove By-election 5 November 2020
Party	Candidate	FPv%	Count							
Party	Candidate	FPv%	1	2	3	4	5	6	7	8
SNP	Miranda Radley	47.4	1,661	1,661	1,663	1,672	1,691	1,697	1,716	1,785
Conservative	Christopher Wyles	20.2	709	710	712	713	714	725	746	834
Labour	Shona Simpson	12.2	429	430	430	431	441	446	471	529
Independent	Andy Finlayson	10.5	367	368	368	374	383	419	451	
Liberal Democrats	Moira Henderson	3.6	128	132	132	133	140	148		
Independent	Simon McLean	2.5	92	93	97	99	104			
Green	Daniel Verhamme	1.7	58	60	61	63				
Independent	Lizette Belizzi Houston	0.9	31	32	34					
Independent	Sochima Iroh	0.5	16							
Scottish Libertarian	Bryce Hope	0.5	16							
SNP hold										
Valid: 3,540 Spoilt: 33 Quota: 1,754 Turnout: 3,573

=== 2022-2027 ===
Dyce/Bucksburn/Danestone By-Election 23 February 2023
Party	Candidate	FPv%	Count							
Party	Candidate	FPv%	1	2	3	4	5	6	7	8
Labour	Graeme Lawrence	25.7	1,227	1,233	1,255	1,282	1,306	1,459	1,971	2,596
SNP	Tomasz Brzezinski	30.5	1,455	1,461	1,465	1,513	1,604	1,674	1,729	
Conservative	Akila Kanthaswamy	24.9	1,190	1,192	1,201	1,205	1,216	1,310		
Liberal Democrats	Mevrick Fernandes	9.4	452	460	464	480	491			
Alba	Charlie Abel	3.7	178	181	183	191				
Green	Sylvia Hardie	2.3	111	116	121					
Scottish Family	Amy-Marie Stratton	1.2	60	68						
Independent	Simon McLean	1.1	52							
Labour gain from Conservative										
Valid: 4,725 Spoilt: 47 Quota: 2,363 Turnout: 4,772

George Street/Harbour By-Election 26 June 2026
Party	Candidate	FPv%	Count							
Party	Candidate	FPv%	1	2	3	4	5	6	7	8
SNP	Leon Marwick	33.1	583	587	590	597	629	673	694	896
Labour	Edward Obi	14.5	255	255	257	266	295	341	372	419
Green	Charlotte Horne	13.2	232	233	247	250	266	305	326	
Reform	Jordan Brown	10.1	177	179	183	211	214	230		
Liberal Democrats	Luke Eveling	9.2	162	162	164	195	205			
Independent	Aamir Azeem	9.2	162	163	163	168				
Conservative	Marco Oosthuizen	8.3	146	146	147					
TUSC	Fred Bayer	1.8	31	32						
AtLS	Konrad Rekas	0.7	13							
SNP gain from Liberal Democrats										
Valid: 1,761 Spoilt: 24 Quota: 881 Turnout: 1,785

Midstocket/Rosemount By-Election 8 October 2026
Party	Candidate	FPv%	Count							
Party	Candidate	FPv%	1	2	3	4	5	6	7	8
SNP	Jeff Diack	27.9	861	865	881	907	929	1,148	1,322	1,454
Conservative	Freddie John	24.1	743	744	747	770	918	927	1,042	
Labour	Willie Young	17.3	535	537	545	605	618	693		
Green	Lauren Bird	10.7	330	335	349	382	391			
Reform	John McLeod	10.5	323	326	328	334				
Liberal Democrats	Sandy Stephen	6.2	192	199	216					
Independent	Kusum Singal	2.2	67	76						
Independent	Simon McLean	1.2	37							
SNP hold										
Valid: 3,088 Spoilt: 33 Quota: 1,545 Turnout: 3,121
