= Hazlehead/Queens Cross/Countesswells =

Council ward in Aberdeen, Scotland

- Aberdeen City Council
- Boundary of Hazlehead/Queens Cross/Countesswells in Aberdeen from 2017.
- Electorate: 15,281

Current ward
- Created: 2007
- Councillor: Martin Greig (Liberal Democrats)
- Councillor: Jennifer Stewart (Liberal Democrats)
- Councillor: Ken McLeod (Conservative)
- Councillor: John Cooke (SNP)

Hazlehead/Queens Cross/Countesswells (previously known as Hazlehead/Ashley/Queens Cross) is one of the thirteen wards used to elect members of the Aberdeen City Council. It elects three Councillors.

== Councillors ==
Election	Councillors			
2007	Martin Greig (Liberal Democrats)	Jennifer Stewart (Liberal Democrats)	Jim Farquharson (Conservative)	John West (SNP)
2012	Martin Greig (Liberal Democrats)	Jennifer Stewart (Liberal Democrats)	Ross Thomson (Conservative)	John Munro Corall (SNP)
2017	Martin Greig (Liberal Democrats)	Jennifer Stewart (Liberal Democrats)	Claire Imrie (Conservative)	John Cooke (SNP)
2022	Martin Greig (Liberal Democrats)	Jennifer Stewart (Liberal Democrats)	Ken McLeod (Conservative)	John Cooke (SNP)

== Election results ==
=== 2022 election ===
Hazlehead/Queens Cross/Countesswells – 4 seats
Party	Candidate	FPv%	Count						
Party	Candidate	FPv%	1	2	3	4	5	6	7
Liberal Democrats	Martin Greig (incumbent)	25.4	1,967						
Independent	Jennifer Stewart (incumbent)	20.9	1,618						
SNP	John Cooke (incumbent)	18.4	1,426	1,476	1,487	1,650			
Conservative	Ken McLeod	13.2	1,021	1,116	1,134	1,139	1,142	1,262	2,238
Conservative	Lars Frevert	12.2	941	1,003	1,011	1,017	1,020	1,123	
Labour	Mohamed Mosobbir	6.3	486	552	561	661	703		
Green	Becky Rafferty	3.6	277	319	324				
Electorate: 15,281 Valid: 7,736 Spoilt: 72 Quota: 1,548 Turnout: 51.1%

=== 2017 election ===
2017 Aberdeen City Council election

Hazlehead/Ashley/Queens Cross – 4 seats
Party	Candidate	FPv%	Count				
Party	Candidate	FPv%	1	2	3	4	5
Liberal Democrats	Jennifer Stewart (incumbent) ‡	23.0	1,725				
Liberal Democrats	Martin Greig (incumbent)	21.2	1,592				
Conservative	Claire Imrie	17.7	1,326	1,380.5	1,395.4	1,448	2,614.1
Conservative	Steve Robertson	16.2	1,214	1,251.4	1,273.8	1,345.4	
SNP	John Cooke	16.1	1,210	1,239.9	1,251.8	1,371.9	1,396.4
Labour	John McLeod	5.9	441	470.2	481.1		
Electorate: TBC Valid: 7,508 Spoilt: 131 Quota: 1,502 Turnout: 7,639 (54.3%)

=== 2012 election ===
2012 Aberdeen City Council election

Hazlehead/Ashley/Queens Cross - 4 seats
Party	Candidate	FPv%	Count							
Party	Candidate	FPv%	1	2	3	4	5	6	7	8
Liberal Democrats	Jennifer Stewart (incumbent)	25.5%	1,498							
Liberal Democrats	Martin Greig (incumbent)	23.8%	1,399							
Conservative	Ross Thomson	15.3%	899	962.9	1,005.7	1,012.9	1,017.2	1,186.1		
Labour	Sandra MacDonald	12.5%	738	777.9	805.6	864.1	873.6	922.3	923.3	
SNP	John Munro Corall *	10.8%	634	654.6	667.1	691.4	931.6	975.2	975.8	1,139.5
Independent	Jim Farquharson (incumbent)	5.6%	328	379.6	414.9	439.6	441.4			
SNP	Stephen Mark Flynn	4.2%	248	262.8	269.1	274				
Green	Peter Alexander Kennedy	2.4%	140	158.6	173.6					
Electorate: 13,658 Valid: 5,884 Spoilt: 65 Quota: 1,177 Turnout: 5,949 (43.08%)

=== 2007 election ===
2007 Aberdeen City Council election

Hazlehead/Ashley/Queens Cross - 4 seats
Party	Candidate	FPv%	Count						
Party	Candidate	FPv%	1	2	3	4	5	6	7
Liberal Democrats	Martin Greig	24.0	1,901						
Conservative	Jim Farquharson†††	21.8	1,728	1,728					
Liberal Democrats	Jennifer Stewart	20.4	1,614	1,614	1,614				
SNP	John West	14.2	1,126	1,168	1,172	1,175	1,195	1,273	1,352
Labour	Timothy Harris	10.8	855	904	906	910	917	972	1,041
Conservative	Fraser Forsyth	5.1	406	457	573	578	583	614	
Green	Rachel Shanks	2.8	220	264	266	270	285		
Scottish Socialist	Howard Chandler	0.8	65	69	69	70			
Electorate: Valid: 7,915 Spoilt: 83 Quota: 1,584 Turnout: 7,998
