= Midstocket/Rosemount =

Council ward in Aberdeen, Scotland

- Aberdeen City
- Boundary of Midstocket/Rosemount in Aberdeen from 2017.
- Electorate: 10,979

Current ward
- Created: 2007
- Councillor: Jennifer Bonsell (Labour)
- Councillor: Emma Farquhar (Conservative)
- Councillor: Jeff Diack (SNP)

Midstocket/Rosemount is one of the thirteen wards used to elect members of the Aberdeen City Council. It elects three Councillors.

== Councillors ==
Election	Councillors		
2007	Bill Cormie (SNP)	Jenny Laing (Labour)	John Porter (Conservative)
2011 by-election	Bill Cormie (SNP)	Jenny Laing (Labour)	John Corall (SNP)
2012	Bill Cormie (SNP)	Jenny Laing (Labour)	Fraser Forsyth (Conservative)
2015 by-election	Bill Cormie (SNP)	Jenny Laing (Labour)	Alex Nicoll (SNP)
2017	Bill Cormie (SNP)	Jenny Laing (Labour)	Tom Mason (Conservative)
2022	Bill Cormie (SNP)	Jennifer Bonsell (Labour)	Emma Farquhar (Conservative)
2026 by-election	Jeff Diack (SNP)	Jennifer Bonsell (Labour)	Emma Farquhar (Conservative)

== Election results ==
=== 2026 by-election ===
Midstocket/Rosemount by-election (8 October 2026) – 1 seat
Party	Candidate	FPv%	Count							
Party	Candidate	FPv%	1	2	3	4	5	6	7	8
SNP	Jeff Diack	27.8	861	865	881	907	929	1,148	1,322	1,454
Conservative	Freddie John	24.0	743	744	747	770	918	927	1,042	
Labour	Willie Young	17.3	535	537	545	605	618	693		
Green	Lauren Bird	10.6	330	335	349	382	391			
Reform	John McLeod	10.4	323	326	328	334				
Liberal Democrats	Sandy Stephen	6.2	192	199	216					
Independent	Kusum Singal	2.1	67	76						
Independent	Simon McLean	1.2	37							
Electorate: 11,768 Valid: 3,092 Spoilt: 33 Quota: 1,545 Turnout: 26.5%

=== 2022 election ===
Midstocket/Rosemount – 3 seats
Party	Candidate	FPv%	Count				
Party	Candidate	FPv%	1	2	3	4	5
SNP	Bill Cormie (incumbent)	27.0	1,264				
Conservative	Emma Farquhar	24.5	1,150	1,153	1,221		
Labour	Jennifer Bonsell	21.5	1,007	1,014	1,136	1,160	1,334
SNP	William MacKenzie	10.8	507	571	585	587	815
Green	Alex Jarvis	9.3	435	442	514	517	
Liberal Democrats	William Sell	7.0	326	328			
Electorate: 10,979 Valid: 4,689 Spoilt: 85 Quota: 1,173 Turnout: 43.5%

=== Elections in the 2010s ===
2017 Aberdeen City Council election: 4 May 2017
Party	Candidate	FPv%	Count						
Party	Candidate	FPv%	1	2	3	4	5	6	7
Conservative	Tom Mason	27.7%	1,318						
SNP	Bill Cormie (incumbent)	25.1%	1,195						
Labour	Jenny Laing (incumbent)‡	19.7%	935	960.05	960.4	971.05	1,040.2	1,154.2	1,283.3
SNP	Derek Davidson	8.4%	398	399.2	403.8	403.8	491.1	524.9	604.5
Independent	Dustin MacDonald	6.5%	311	323.8	323.9	379.3	419.7	492.4	
Green	Alex Jarvis	5.4%	256	260.5	260.8	268.4			
Liberal Democrats	William Sell	5.2%	245	270.01	272.1	292.9	332.05		
Independent	Bill Robb	2%	97	117.4	117.5				
Electorate: TBC Valid: 4,755 Spoilt: 80 Quota: 1,189 Turnout: 4,835 (44.3%)

Midstocket/Rosemount By-election (1 October 2015) - 1 Seat
Party	Candidate	FPv%	Count			
Party	Candidate	FPv%	1	2	3	4
SNP	Alex Nicoll	40.9%	1,168	1,225	1,275	1,433
Conservative	Tom Mason	23.6%	672	687	771	927
Labour	Howard Gemmell	21.2%	605	629	692	
Liberal Democrats	Ken McLeod	8.3%	238	270		
Green	Jennifer Phillips	6.0%	170			
Electorate: 11,825 Valid: 2,853 Spoilt: 19 Quota: 1,427 Turnout: 2,872 (24.29%)

2012 Aberdeen City Council election: 3 May 2012
Party	Candidate	FPv%	Count						
Party	Candidate	FPv%	1	2	3	4	5	6	7
Labour	Jenny Laing (incumbent)††	32.4%	1,247						
SNP	Bill Cormie (incumbent)	32.1%	1,233						
Conservative	Fraser Forsyth†††	13.8%	531	555.7	579.9	600.2	686.1	751.7	867.6
SNP	Iolanda Serci	6.9%	264	292.8	458.5	468.2	498.2	580.9	
Green	John Laing McCallum	6.4%	245	315.8	333.9	360.7	461.3		
Liberal Democrats	William Sell	6.4%	245	282.3	299.2	321.5			
Independent	Patrick McGuire	2.1%	82	102.8	112.2				
Electorate: 3,895 Valid: 3,847 Spoilt: 48 Quota: 962 Turnout: (33.38%)

Midstocket/Rosemount by-election 16 August 2011 - 1 Seat
Party	Candidate	FPv%	Count				
Party	Candidate	FPv%	1	2	3	4	5
SNP	John Corall	29.5	873	875	885	984	1,258
Conservative	Fraser Forsyth	27.8	821	825	826	873	1,122
Liberal Democrats	Steve Delaney	23.4	693	700	708	869	
Labour	Allan McIntosh	17.5	518	520	529		
Solidarity	Stephen Haddan	1.1	31	33			
Independent	Dennis Grattan	0.7	20				
SNP gain from Conservative		Swing					
Electorate: 10,288 Valid: 2,956 Spoilt: 21 Quota: 1,479 Turnout: 2,977 (28.9%)

=== Elections in the 2000s ===
2007 Aberdeen City Council election: 3 May 2007
Party	Candidate	FPv%	Count				
Party	Candidate	FPv%	1	2	3	4	5
Conservative	John Porter	27.7	1,503				
SNP	Bill Cormie	26.3	1,431	1,431			
Labour	Jenny Laing	21.1	1,144	1,164	1,176	1,223	1,281
Liberal Democrats	Steve Delaney	12.4	671	689	702	753	1,201
Liberal Democrats	Jim Donaldson	9.7	529	563	570	586	
Scottish Socialist	Christine Chandler	2.8	153	155	167		
Electorate: Valid: 5,431 Spoilt: 60 Quota: 1,358 Turnout: 5,491
