= Tillydrone/Seaton/Old Aberdeen =

Council ward in Aberdeen, Scotland

- Aberdeen City Council
- Boundary of Tillydrone/Seaton/Old Aberdeen in Aberdeen from 2017.
- Electorate: 8,872

Current ward
- Created: 2007
- Councillor: Kairin Van Sweeden (SNP)
- Councillor: Ross Grant (Labour)
- Councillor: Alexander McLellan (SNP)

Tillydrone/Seaton/Old Aberdeen is one of the thirteen wards used to elect members of the Aberdeen City Council. It elects three Councillors.

== Councillors ==
Election	Councillors		
2007	Jim Noble (SNP)	Norman Collie (Labour)	Richard Robertson (Liberal Democrats)
2012	Jim Noble (SNP)	Ross Grant (Labour)	Ramsay Milne (Labour)
2017	Jim Noble (SNP)	Ross Grant (Labour)	Alexander McLellan (SNP)
2022	Kairin Van Sweeden (SNP)	Ross Grant (Labour)	Alexander McLellan (SNP)

== Election results ==
=== 2022 election ===
Tillydrone/Seaton/Old Aberdeen – 3 seats
Party	Candidate	FPv%	Count									
Party	Candidate	FPv%	1	2	3	4	5	6	7	8	9	10
SNP	Alexander McLellan (incumbent)	34.8	911									
Labour	Ross Grant (incumbent)	22.2	582	602	612	621	635	708				
Conservative	Vish Archer	10.7	281	283	293	301	315	321	327	357	375	
SNP	Kairin Van Sweeden	8.5	222	395	401	415	425	435	442	460	612	665
Green	Ashish Malik	7.3	192	205	215	226	237	245	251	282		
Liberal Democrats	Eileen Frances Delaney	4.5	118	121	125	130	135	145	154			
Labour	Shona Simpson	3.7	98	104	108	115	127					
Independent	Peter Nicol	2.9	77	85	94	103						
Scottish Family	Graham Charles Elder	2.6	69	72								
Alba	Robert Reid	2.5	66	74	80							
Electorate: 8,872 Valid: 2,616 Spoilt: 111 Quota: 655 Turnout: 30.7%

=== Elections in the 2010s ===
2017 Aberdeen City Council election: 4 May 2017
Party	Candidate	FPv%	Count								
Party	Candidate	FPv%	1	2	3	4	5	6	7	8	9
Labour	Ross Grant (incumbent)‡	27%	867								
SNP	Alexander McLellan	25.6%	825								
SNP	Jim Noble (incumbent)	16.9%	545	549.6	566.9	569.9	582.9	595.2	682.9	774.5	839.7
Conservative	Emma Farquhar	10.6%	342	344.3	344.5	350.5	372.5	408.7	432.1	471.2	
Labour	Ramsay Milne (incumbent)	7.6%	245	288.3	288.8	293.01	296.4	326.9	379.9		
Green	Alex Arthur	5.5%	178	180.5	181.06	182.06	188.3	231.3			
Liberal Democrats	Jenny Wilson	4.1%	133	134.3	134.5	137.5	142.6				
UKIP	Stephen Adams	1.6%	53	53.9	54.02	60.03					
National Front	Dave MacDonald	0.9%	29	29.3	29.3						
Electorate: TBC Valid: 3,217 Spoilt: 133 Quota: 805 Turnout: 3,350 (36.4%)

2012 Aberdeen City Council election: 3 May 2012
Party	Candidate	FPv%	Count							
Party	Candidate	FPv%	1	2	3	4	5	6	7	8
Labour	Ross Grant	30.4%	846							
SNP	Jim Noble (incumbent)	25.5%	710							
Labour	Ramsay Milne	14.1%	392	513	513.6	516.9	527.7	560.5	614.4	724.4
SNP	Mike Park	7.8%	218	224.6	237.6	241.7	250.9	268.9	304.2	350.4
Green	Gina Ford	6.4%	179	182.4	182.6	185.6	199.8	244.4	290.9	
Independent	Norman Collie (incumbent)	5.8%	161	164.7	165	169	188.2			
Liberal Democrats	David Green	4.6%	129	133.5	133.7	133.7	171.8			
Conservative	Daniel Stephen McCroskrie	4.3%	119	121.1	121.2	123.2				
National Front	Mike Phillips	0.9%	25	25.9	25.9					
Electorate: 12,655 Valid: 2,779 Spoilt: 92 Quota: 695 Turnout: 2,871 (21.96%)

=== Elections in the 2000s ===
2007 Aberdeen City Council election: 3 May 2007
Party	Candidate	FPv%	Count					
Party	Candidate	FPv%	1	2	3	4	5	6
SNP	Jim Noble	31.9	1,365					
Labour	Norman Collie††	25.1	1,074	1,074				
Liberal Democrats	Richard Robertson	13.7	585	638	638	659	799	926
Labour	Sandra Macdonald	13.9	595	634	635	648	718	791
Conservative	Hannah Dolan	7.8	333	347	347	354	377	
Green	Daniel Johnston	5.7	244	289	289	329		
Solidarity	Angela McLeman	2.1	88	110	110			
Electorate: Valid: 4,284 Spoilt: 109 Quota: 1,072 Turnout: 4,393
