= Bridge of Don (ward) =

Council ward in Aberdeen, Scotland

- Aberdeen City Council
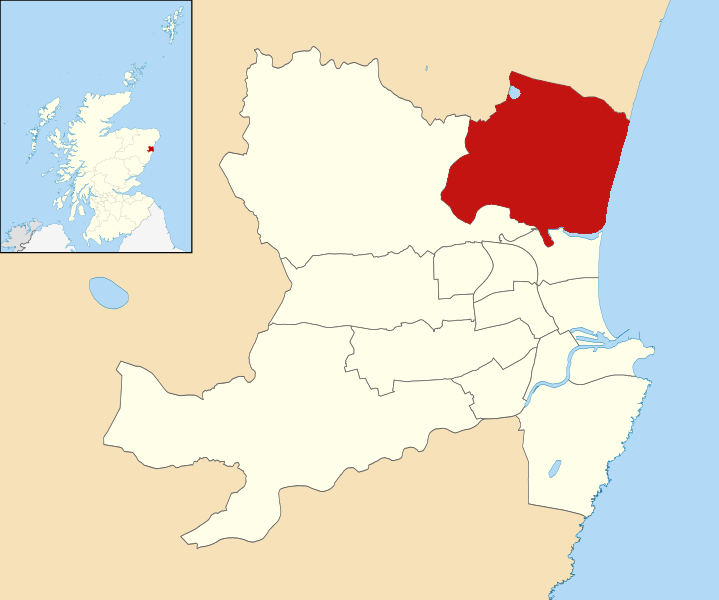
- Boundary of Bridge of Don in Aberdeen from 2017.
- Electorate: 15,188

Current ward
- Created: 1999
- Councillor: Alison Alphonse (SNP)
- Councillor: Jessica Mennie (SNP)
- Councillor: Nurul Hoque Ali (Lab)
- Councillor: Sarah Cross (Conservative)

Bridge of Don is a ward represented in the Aberdeen City Council since 2017 by Sarah Cross of the Conservative Party, Alison Alphonse and Jessica Mennie, both of the Scottish National Party, and Nurul Hoque Ali of the Labour Party. (Note: As with all Scottish councils, the ward elects councillors by the Single transferable vote system of election every five years.)

== Boundaries ==
In the Fourth Statutory Review of Electoral Arrangements, conducted by The Local Government Boundary Commission for Scotland, and published in 2006, the ward is described to contain the whole suburb of the Bridge of Don.

== Councillors ==
Election	Councillors			
2007	Muriel Jaffrey (SNP)	Willie Young (Labour)	John Reynolds (Liberal Democrats /Ind.)	Gordon Leslie (Liberal Democrats)
2012	Muriel Jaffrey (SNP)	Willie Young (Labour)	John Reynolds (Liberal Democrats /Ind.)	Sandy Stuart (SNP)
2017	Alison Alphonse (SNP)	Brett Hunt (Conservative)	John Reynolds (Liberal Democrats /Ind.)	Sandy Stuart (SNP)
2019 by-election	Alison Alphonse (SNP)	Sarah Cross (Conservative)	John Reynolds (Liberal Democrats /Ind.)	Jessica Mennie (SNP)
2022	Alison Alphonse (SNP)	Sarah Cross (Conservative)	Nurul Hoque Ali (Labour)	Jessica Mennie (SNP)

== Election results ==
=== 2022 election ===
Bridge of Don – 4 seats
Party	Candidate	FPv%	Count							
Party	Candidate	FPv%	1	2	3	4	5	6	7	8
SNP	Alison Alphonse (incumbent)	24.3	1,649							
Conservative	Sarah Cross (incumbent)	23.5	1,594							
SNP	Jessica Mennie (incumbent)	16.1	1,094	1,339	1,341	1,347	1,450			
Labour	Nurul Hoque Ali	15.3	1,040	1,053	1,066	1,076	1,118	1,136	1,246	1,708
Liberal Democrats	Mevrick Renson Fernandes	10.9	739	748	762	783	833	852	1,033	
Conservative	Matthew Watt	5.6	379	380	564	578	583	585		
Green	Sylvia Hardie	3.1	210	220	221	226				
Scottish Family	Harald Rainer Bartl	1.3	88	88	90					
Electorate: 15,216 Valid: 6,793 Spoilt: 137 Quota: 1,359 Turnout: 45.5%

=== Elections of the 2010s ===
Bridge of Don by-election: 3 October 2019
Party	Candidate	FPv%	Count
Party	Candidate	FPv%	1
Conservative	Sarah Cross	36.2%	1,857
SNP	Jessica Mennie	35.0%	1,797
Liberal Democrats	Michael Skoczykloda	18.1%	929
Labour	Graeme Lawrence	5.9%	305
Green	Sylvia Hardie	2.7%	140
Independent	Simon McLean	0.8%	43
Red Party of Scotland	Max McKay	0.17%	9
Electorate: 15,188 Valid: 5,135 Spoilt: 66 Quota: 1,712 Turnout: 34.2%

Aberdeen City Council Election: 4 May 2017
Party	Candidate	FPv%	Count								
Party	Candidate	FPv%	1	2	3	4	5	6	7	8	9
Conservative	Brett Hunt‡‡‡‡	25.8	1,868								
SNP	Alison Alphonse	22.2	1,610								
Independent	John Reynolds (incumbent)	14.4	1,045	1,132.2	1,137.6	1,140.1	1,179.6	1,327.2	1,598.9		
SNP	Sandy Stuart (incumbent)‡‡‡	11.9	862	869.9	996.7	1,000.4	1,009.7	1,056.04	1,130.7	1,157.8	1,373.4
Labour	Willie Young (incumbent)	11.1	805	849.9	854.09	856.2	856.2	871.3	1,026.3	1,047.03	
Liberal Democrats	Karen Farquhar	9.2	669	782.9	791.2	794.3	803.5	850.2			
Independent	George Saunders	3.8	279	305.8	308.5	317.7	338.9				
Independent	Simon McLean	1.0	70	83.3	84.07	91.9					
Solidarity	James Irving-Lewis	0.4	28	32.7	35.2						
Electorate: TBC Valid: 7,236 Spoilt: 114 Quota: 1,448 Turnout: 7,350 (49.3%)

Aberdeen City Council Election: 3 May 2012
Party	Candidate	FPv%	Count								
Party	Candidate	FPv%	1	2	3	4	5	6	7	8	9
Independent	John Reynolds (incumbent)	28.0%	1,530								
SNP	Muriel Jaffrey (incumbent)	20.5%	1,119								
Labour	Willie Young (incumbent)	18.8%	1,031	1,085.9	1,087	1,112.5					
SNP	Sandy Stuart	9.5%	520	559.5	570.9	576.8	578.5	595.6	612.5	985.5	1,107.2
SNP	Graham Bennett	7.2%	396	418.2	425.3	433.9	434.8	449.4	465.1		
Liberal Democrats	Millie McLeod	6.2%	338	412.8	414.1	436.1	438.7	498.4	640.7	660.3	
Conservative	Francis Davidson Webster	6.1%	333	360.3	360.5	364.3	365.2	385.1			
Independent	Gordon A. Leslie (incumbent)	2.0%	107	217.6	218.5	238.4	241				
Green	Daniel Kenneth Juett	1.8%	97	107.2	107.5						
Electorate: 14,188 Valid: 5,471 Spoilt: 68 Quota: 1,095 Turnout: 5,539 (38.56%)

=== Elections of the 2000s ===
Aberdeen City Council Election: 3 May 2007
Party	Candidate	FPv%	Count					
Party	Candidate	FPv%	1	2	3	4	5	6
SNP	Muriel Jaffrey	36.3	2,805					
Labour	Willie Young	20.9	1,615	1,615				
Liberal Democrats	John Reynolds†	18.3	1,411	1,573	1,573			
Liberal Democrats	Gordon Leslie†††††	9.5	731	921	929	938	977	1,316
Conservative	Brian Davidson	7.9	610	726	731	733	783	827
Liberal Democrats	Millie McLeod	5.2	404	509	523	535	587	
Independent	Hamish Mackay	1.9	146	267	272	273		
Electorate: Valid: 7,722 Spoilt: 92 Quota: 1,545 Turnout: 7,814
