= George Street/Harbour =

Council ward in Aberdeen, Scotland

- Aberdeen City
- Boundary of George Street/Harbour in Aberdeen from 2017.
- Population: 19,588 (2021)
- Electorate: 13,461 (2026)

Current ward
- Created: 2007
- Number of councillors: 4
- Councillor: Michael Hutchison (SNP)
- Councillor: Sandra MacDonald (Labour)
- Councillor: Dell Henrickson (SNP)
- Councillor: Leon Marwick (SNP)

George Street/Harbour is one of the thirteen wards used to elect members of the Aberdeen City Council. It elects four Councillors.

== Councillors ==
Year	Councillors			
2007	Andrew May (SNP)	Jim Hunter (Labour)	John Stewart (Liberal Democrats)	3 seats
2012	Andrew May (SNP)	Jean Morrison (Labour)	Nathan Morrison (Labour)	3 seats
2015	Michael Hutchison (SNP)	Jean Morrison (Labour)	Nathan Morrison (Labour)	3 seats
2017	Michael Hutchison (SNP)	Sandra MacDonald (Labour)	Dell Henrickson (SNP)	Ryan Houghton (Conservative)
2022	Michael Hutchison (SNP)	Sandra MacDonald (Labour)	Dell Henrickson (SNP)	Desmond Bouse (Liberal Democrats)
2026	Michael Hutchison (SNP)	Sandra MacDonald (Labour)	Dell Henrickson (SNP)	Leon Marwick (SNP)

== Election results ==
=== 2026 by-election ===
George Street/Harbour by-election (25 June 2026) – 1 seat
Party	Candidate	FPv%	Count							
Party	Candidate	FPv%	1	2	3	4	5	6	7	8
SNP	Leon Marwick	33.1	583	587	590	597	629	673	694	896
Labour	Edward Obi	14.5	255	255	257	266	295	341	372	419
Green	Charlotte Horne	13.1	232	233	247	250	266	305	326	
Reform	Jordan Brown	10.0	177	179	183	211	214	230		
Independent	Aamir Azeem	9.2	162	163	163	168				
Liberal Democrats	Luke Eveling	9.2	162	162	164	195	205			
Conservative	Marco Oosthuizen	8.2	146	146	147					
TUSC	Fred Bayer	1.7	31	32						
AtLS	Konrad Rekas	0.7	13							
Electorate: 13,461 Valid: 1,761 Spoilt: 24 Quota: 881 Turnout: 13.3%

=== 2022 election ===
George Street/Harbour – 4 seats
Party	Candidate	FPv%	Count						
Party	Candidate	FPv%	1	2	3	4	5	6	7
SNP	Michael Hutchison (incumbent)	22.2	762						
SNP	Dell Henrickson (incumbent)	20.0	684	745					
Labour	Sandra Macdonald (incumbent)	19.8	678	682	690				
Green	Guy Ingerson	13.8	474	478	506	507	521	548	
Liberal Democrats	Desmond Bouse	11.4	391	392	397	398	417	599	871
Conservative	Shane Painter	10.9	375	375	377	377	386		
Independent	Mac Ahmed Chaudry	1.8	63	63	66	66			
Electorate: 12,378 Valid: 3,427 Spoilt: 78 Quota: 686 Turnout: 28.3%

=== 2017 election ===
2017 Aberdeen City Council election

George Street/Harbour – 4 seats
Party	Candidate	FPv%	Count								
Party	Candidate	FPv%	1	2	3	4	5	6	7	8	9
SNP	Dell Henrickson	20.8%	753								
SNP	Michael Hutchison (incumbent)	17.4%	632	650.5	653.5	676.7	866.6				
Conservative	Ryan Houghton	16.2%	588	588.6	601.7	641.7	646.7	649.9	664.1	688.9	836.4
Labour	Sandra MacDonald‡	15%	545	545.9	549.9	578.9	582.9	596.8	864.2		
Green	Guy Ingerson	10%	364	365.04	366.04	425.1	440.3	489.7	500.2	534.8	
Labour	Mike Scott	8.1%	292	292.1	293.1	315.1	316.2	320.1			
SNP	Wendy Stuart	5.8%	210	215.4	216.5	222.5					
Liberal Democrats	John Waddell	5.7%	206	206.3	211.3						
UKIP	John Stephen	0.9%	32	32.1							
Electorate: TBC Valid: 3,622 Spoilt: 103 Quota: 725 Turnout: 3,725 (30.5%)

=== 2015 by-election ===
George Street/Harbour By-election (1 October 2015) - 1 Seat
Party	Candidate	FPv%	Count
Party	Candidate	FPv%	1
SNP	Michael Hutchinson	51.2%	961
Labour	Mike Scott	26.1%	490
Conservative	Brian Davidson	10.4%	195
Green	Alex Jarvis	7.2%	136
Liberal Democrats	Euan Davidson	5.1%	96
Electorate: 12,179 Valid: 1,878 Spoilt: 20 Quota: 940 Turnout: 1,898 (15.58%)

=== 2012 election ===
2012 Aberdeen City Council election

George Street/Harbour - 3 seats
Party	Candidate	FPv%	Count									
Party	Candidate	FPv%	1	2	3	4	5	6	7	8	9	10
SNP	Andrew May (incumbent)††††††	25.3%	672									
Labour	Jean Morrison	17.2%	456	456.5	457.5	457.5	458.5	475.5	521.5	534.9	597	710.2
Labour	Nathan Morrison	14.3%	381	381.3	382.3	385.3	386.3	391.3	414.3	443.8	494.8	570.9
Liberal Democrats	Kris Chapman	9.9%	262	262.2	262.2	263.2	265.2	328.2	383.2	419.8	464.9	
SNP	James Wiseman West	8.4%	224	229.3	230.3	237.3	238.3	248.3	268.4			
Independent	Jim Hunter (incumbent)	8.4%	222	222.2	224.2	228.2	244.2	266.2	296.2	327.7		
Green	Richie Brian	7.3%	194	194.2	195.2	197.2	203.2	217.2				
Conservative	Brian George Davidson	6.7%	178	178.1	179.1	179.1	181.1					
National Front	Ross Alexander Willett	1.1%	29	29	29							
Independent	Andrew Lovie	0.9%	26	26	32	33						
Independent	Andy Rudgely	0.5%	14	14								
Electorate: 12,991 Valid: 2,658 Spoilt: 76 Quota: 665 Turnout: 2,734 (20.46%)

=== 2007 election ===
2007 Aberdeen City Council election

George Street/Harbour - 3 seats
Party	Candidate	FPv%	Count				
Party	Candidate	FPv%	1	2	3	4	5
SNP	Andrew May	32.4	1,272				
Labour	Jim Hunter††††††	24.5	960	994			
Liberal Democrats	John Stewart	20.4	801	859	860	963	1,071
Green	Clive Kempe	7.8	306	364	365	414	492
Labour	George Penny	8.2	322	343	351	382	
Conservative	Alexander Olsen	6.7	261	282	282		
Electorate: Valid: 3,922 Spoilt: 91 Quota: 981 Turnout: 4,013
