= Dyce/Bucksburn/Danestone =

Council ward in Aberdeen, Scotland

Dyce/Buckburn/Danestone
- Aberdeen City
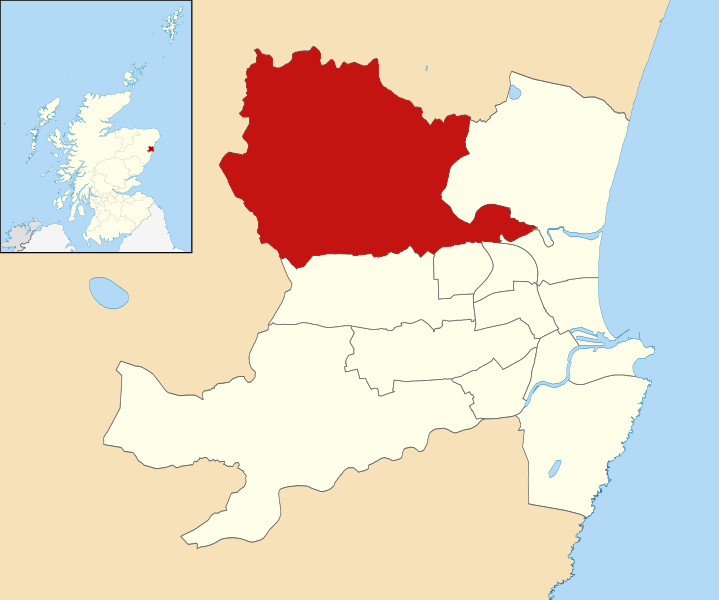
- Boundary of Dyce/Buckburn/Danestone in Aberdeen from 2017–present.
- Population: 19,139 (2021)
- Electorate: 15,278 (2022)
- Scottish Parliament constituency: Aberdeen Donside
- Scottish Parliament region: North East Scotland
- UK Parliament constituency: Aberdeen North

Current ward
- Created: 2007
- Number of councillors: 4
- Councillor: Neil MacGregor (SNP)
- Councillor: Gill Samarai (SNP)
- Councillor: Barney Crockett (Labour)
- Councillor: Graeme Lawrence (Labour)

Dyce/Bucksburn/Danestone is a ward represented in the Aberdeen City Council. As with all Scottish councils, the council elects its councillors by the Single transferable vote system of election every five years.

The ward elects four councillors.

Barney Crockett of the Labour Party, and Neil MacGregor and Gill Samarai, both of the Scottish National Party have been councillors in the ward since 2017, (Note: As with all Scottish councils, the ward elects four councillors by the Single transferable vote system of election every five years.) whilst Graeme Lawrence of the Labour Party was elected in a by-election in 2023.

== Boundaries ==
In the Fourth Statutory Review of Electoral Arrangements, conducted by The Local Government Boundary Commission for Scotland, and published in 2006, the ward is described to contain the areas of Dyce, Aberdeen Airport and its surrounding area, Stoneywood, Bankhead, and Bucksburn.

== Councillors ==
Election	Councillors			
2007	Mark McDonald (SNP)	Barney Crockett (Labour)	Ron Clark (Liberal Democrats)	George Penny (Liberal Democrats)
2011 by-election	Mark McDonald (SNP)	Barney Crockett (Labour)	Neil MacGregor (SNP)	George Penny (Liberal Democrats)
2012	Gill Samarai (SNP)	Barney Crockett (Labour)	Neil MacGregor (SNP)	Graeme Lawrence (Labour)
2017	Gill Samarai (SNP)	Barney Crockett (Labour)	Neil MacGregor (SNP)	Avril MacKenzie (Conservative)
2022	Gill Samarai (SNP)	Barney Crockett (Labour)	Neil MacGregor (SNP)	Avril MacKenzie (Conservative)
2023 by-election	Gill Samarai (SNP)	Barney Crockett (Labour)	Neil MacGregor (SNP)	Graeme Lawrence (Labour)

== Election results ==
=== 2023 by-election ===
A by-election was held on 23 February 2023 after Conservative councillor Avril MacKenzie died on 1 December 2022. It was won by Labour's Graeme Lawrence, who previously represented the ward from 2012 to 2017.

Dyce/Bucksburn/Danestone by-election (23 February 2023) – 1 seat
Party	Candidate	FPv%	Count							
Party	Candidate	FPv%	1	2	3	4	5	6	7	8
SNP	Tomasz Brzezinski	30.5	1,455	1,461	1,465	1,513	1,604	1,674	1,729	
Labour	Graeme Lawrence	25.7	1,227	1,233	1,255	1,282	1,306	1,459	1,971	2,596
Conservative	Akila Kanthaswamy	24.9	1,190	1,192	1,201	1,205	1,216	1,310		
Liberal Democrats	Mevrick Fernandes	9.4	452	460	464	480	491			
Alba	Charlie Abel	3.7	178	181	183	191				
Green	Sylvia Hardie	2.3	111	116	121					
Scottish Family	Amy-Marie Stratton	1.2	60	68						
Independent	Simon McLean	1.1	52							
Electorate: 16,926 Valid: 4,772 Spoilt: 47 Quota: 2,363 Turnout: 28.2%

=== 2022 election ===
Dyce/Bucksburn/Danestone – 4 seats
Party	Candidate	FPv%	Count						
Party	Candidate	FPv%	1	2	3	4	5	6	7
SNP	Gill Al-Samarai (incumbent)	23.3	1,538						
Conservative	Avril MacKenzie (incumbent)	21.0	1,387						
SNP	Neil MacGregor (incumbent)	18.0	1,188	1,362					
Labour	Barney Crockett (incumbent) (Note: Cllr Crockett resigned from Labour in June 2023 to sit as an independent.)	17.8	1,174	1,184	1,187	1,193	1,207	1,311	1,408
Liberal Democrats	Peter Heald	8.8	579	584	587	592	608	717	850
Conservative	Braiden Smith	5.2	341	341	397	398	419	433	
Green	William Ball	4.5	296	312	312	327	345		
Scottish Family	Amy-Marie Stratton	1.4	95	96	96	98			
Electorate: 16,446 Valid: 6,598 Spoilt: 168 Quota: 1,320 Turnout: 41.1%

=== Elections of the 2010s ===
Aberdeen City Council election: 4 May 2017
Party	Candidate	FPv%	Count					
Party	Candidate	FPv%	1	2	3	4	5	6
Conservative	Avril MacKenzie	30.4	2,012					
SNP	Neil MacGregor (incumbent)	25.3	1,670					
SNP	Gill Samarai (incumbent)	11.9	785	798.7	1,087.3	1,115.5	1,176.8	1,317.9
Labour	Barney Crockett (incumbent)‡	11.3	744	806	813.5	1,141.6	1,273.4	1,483.7
Independent	Coral Duthie	7.7	509	658.1	669.8	708.9	942.9	
Labour	Graeme Lawrence (incumbent)	6.9	458	504.9	514.3			
Liberal Democrats	Dorothy Pearce	6.5	430	614.5	625.5	666.2		
Electorate: TBC Valid: 6,608 Spoilt: 145 Quota: 1,322 Turnout: 6,753 (44.2%)

Aberdeen City Council election: 3 May 2012
Party	Candidate	FPv%	Count								
Party	Candidate	FPv%	1	2	3	4	5	6	7	8	9
Labour	Barney Crockett (incumbent)	29.4%	1,378								
SNP	Neil MacGregor (incumbent)	25.5%	1,198								
SNP	Gill Samarai	8.8%	412	419	513.1	525.7	536.4	544.1	948.6		
Conservative	Duncan Stewart	7.7%	360	367	370.3	380.7	402.6				
SNP	Caroline Elizabeth Little	7.6%	358	367.6	479.8	487.4	507.4	525.3			
Liberal Democrats	Brian Malone	7.5%	353	368.3	377.4	392.8	428.1	585.7	607.1	607.7	
Labour	Graeme Lawrence	7.3%	344	681.7	693.1	718.1	771	816.2	834.2	835.2	991.4
Independent	Angela Joss	3.7%	174	190.2	195.9	232.8					
Green	Rhonda Reekie	2.5%	117	128.1	134.9						
Electorate: 14,122 Valid: 4,694 Spoilt: 92 Quota: 939 Turnout: 4,786 (33.24%)

Dyce/Bucksburn/Danestone by-election: 19th May 2011
Party	Candidate	FPv%	Count
Party	Candidate	FPv%	1
SNP	Neil MacGregor	51.4	2,090
Labour	Graeme Lawrence	23.1	941
Liberal Democrats	Kristian Chapman	11.0	446
Conservative	Ross Thomson	8.7	352
Independent	Angela Joss	3.7	150
Green	Rhonda Reekie	2.2	88
SNP gain from Liberal Democrats		Swing	
Electorate: Valid: 4,067 Spoilt: Quota: 2,034 Turnout: 29.5%

=== Elections of the 2000s ===
Aberdeen City Council election: 3 May 2007
Party	Candidate	FPv%	Count						
Party	Candidate	FPv%	1	2	3	4	5	6	7
SNP	Mark McDonald	36.2	2,620						
Labour	Barney Crockett	24.9	1,801	1,801					
Liberal Democrats	Ron Clark	21.2	1,534	1,534	1,534				
Liberal Democrats	George Penny	5.0	360	593	667	713	727	769	885
Conservative	Avril MacKenzie	8.3	603	701	730	738	752	781	833
Green	Rhonda Reekie	2.0	147	298	330	335	348	409	
Independent	Angela Dunn	1.6	116	190	211	214	260		
Independent	Dennis Grattan	0.8	57	117	131	133			
Electorate: Valid: 7,238 Spoilt: 111 Quota: 1,448 Turnout: 7,349
