= 2022 Aberdeen City Council election =

Aberdeen City Council election

- 5 May 2022

All 45 seats to Aberdeen City Council 23 seats needed for a majority
- Registered: 165,847
- Turnout: 41.2%
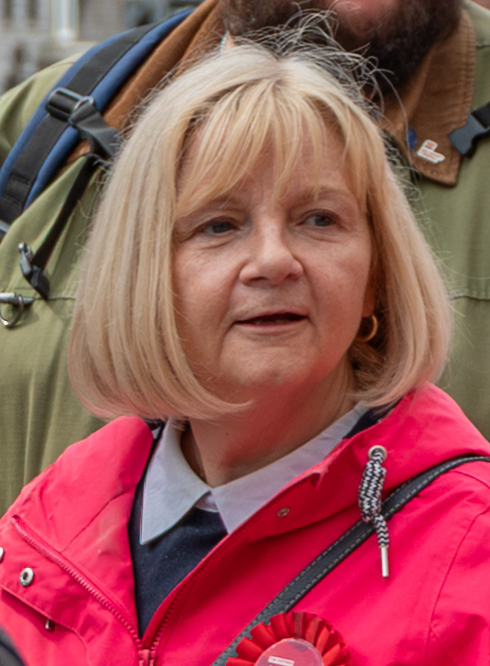

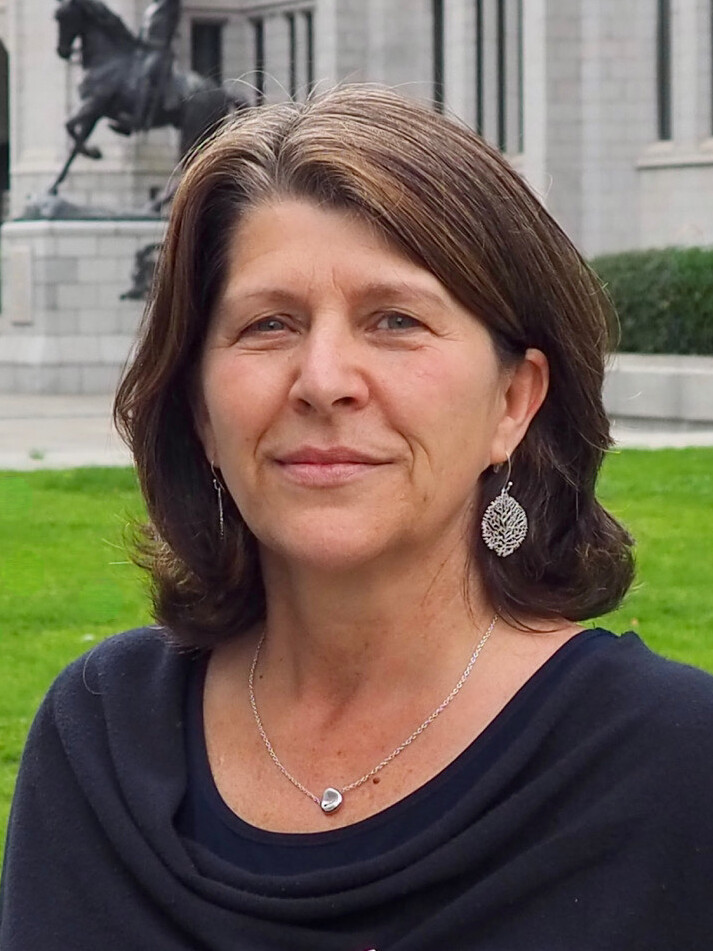
	First party	Second party	Third party
Leader	Alex Nicoll	Jenny Laing	Ryan Houghton
Party	SNP	Labour	Conservative
Leader's seat	Kincorth/Nigg/Cove	Midstocket/Rosemount (retiring)	Airyhall/Broomhill/Garthdee
Last election	19 seats, 32.6%	9 seats, 16.9%	11 seats, 25.0%
Seats before	19	9	10
Seats won	20	11	8
Seat change	▲1	▲2	▼3
Popular vote	23,472	11,731	14,493
Percentage	35.0%	17.5%	21.6%
Swing	▲2.8%	▼0.2%	▼3.1%
	Fourth party	Fifth party
Leader	Ian Yuill	Marie Boulton
Party	Liberal Democrats	Independent
Leader's seat	Airyhall/Broomhill/Garthdee	Lower Deeside
Last election	4 seats, 15.4%	2 seats, 7.9%
Seats before	3	2
Seats won	4	2
Seat change	Steady	Steady
Popular vote	9,404	3,569
Percentage	14.0%	5.3%
Swing	▼1.2%	▼2.0%
- The 13 multi-member wards.

Leader before election
Jenny Laing
(Aberdeen Labour)
No overall control
Co-leaders after election
Alex Nicoll (SNP)
& Ian Yuill (Lib Dem)
No overall control

Elections to Aberdeen City Council took place on 5 May 2022 on the same day as the 31 other Scottish local government elections. As with other Scottish council elections, it was held using single transferable vote (STV) – a form of proportional representation – in which multiple candidates are elected in each ward and each voter casts a ranked vote.

For the second consecutive election, the Scottish National Party (SNP) were returned as the largest party on the council, increasing their number by one to 20 councillors out of 45. Labour – standing under the Aberdeen Labour moniker – regained some of the ground it had lost at the previous election to overtake the Conservatives for second place with 11 councillors (up two), while the Conservatives lost three seats to return eight councillors. The number of Liberal Democrats (four) and independent candidates (two) elected was unchanged, though there had been four independent councillors immediately prior to the election due to a suspension and a resignation.

Following the election, a coalition between the SNP and Liberal Democrats was formed to run the council, taking over from the incumbent Aberdeen Labour administration; this group had been in control of the council following a deal with the Conservatives in 2017 that was not sanctioned by the party hierarchy and resulted in the group being suspended from Labour. Alex Nicoll, SNP group leader, and Ian Yuill, Liberal Democrat group leader, were elected as co-leaders of the council.

== Background ==
=== Previous election ===
At the previous election in 2017, the Scottish National Party (SNP) won the most seats on the council for the first time. The SNP gained four seats to hold 19, four shy of an overall majority, while Labour lost eight seats, which left them with nine as they fell from the largest party to third place. The Conservatives gained eight seats to record their best result in Aberdeen since 1980 with 11 seats, while the Liberal Democrats lost one seat to hold four. Two independent councillors were also elected.

A coalition was formed after the 2017 election between Labour, the Conservatives and independent councillors to run the council. This resulted in the suspension of the nine Labour councillors from the national party as its executive had not approved the coalition. The suspended Labour councillors then sat as the "Aberdeen Labour" group on the council. The Labour Party eventually agreed to re-admit the Aberdeen Labour group in 2021, allowing them to stand as official Labour candidates in the 2022 election. In February 2022, the UK Labour Party registered "Aberdeen Labour" as an official alternative description that its candidates could use on the ballot papers.

2017 Aberdeen City Council election result
Party	Seats	Vote share
SNP	19	32.4%
Conservatives	11	24.7%
Labour	9	17.7%
Liberal Democrats	4	15.2%
Independent	2	7.4%

=== Electoral system ===
The election used the 13 wards created following the fifth statutory review of electoral arrangements conducted by Local Government Boundary Commission for Scotland in 2016, with 45 councillors elected. Each ward elected either three or four councillors, using the single transferable vote (STV) electoral system – a form of proportional representation – where candidates are ranked in order of preference.

=== Composition ===
Following the 2017 election, there were two changes in the political composition of the council. Conservative councillor Alan Donnelly was suspended from the party and subsequently resigned after he was convicted of sexual assault, and Liberal Democrat councillor Jennifer Stewart resigned from the party to become an independent. Following the coalition agreement between Labour and the Conservatives, the nine Labour councillors were suspended and sat as Aberdeen Labour.

Three by-elections were held for four seats. These resulted in an SNP/Conservative hold and two SNP holds.

Composition of Aberdeen City Council
Party	2017 result	Dissolution
SNP	19	19
Conservative	11	10
Labour	9	9
Liberal Democrats	4	3
Independents	2	4

=== Retiring councillors ===
Retiring councillors
Ward	Party	Retiring councillor
Bridge of Don	Independent	John Reynolds
Northfield/Mastrick North	SNP	Jackie Dunbar
Hilton/Woodside/Stockethill	Aberdeen Labour	Lesley Dunbar
Tillydrone/Seaton/Old Aberdeen	SNP	Jim Noble
Midstocket/Rosemount	Aberdeen Labour	Jenny Laing
Midstocket/Rosemount	Conservative	Tom Mason
Lower Deeside	Conservative	Philip Bell
Hazlehead/Queens Cross/Countesswells	Conservative	Claire Imrie
Airyhall/Broomhill/Garthdee	Conservative	Douglas Lumsden
Torry/Ferryhill	SNP	Audrey Nicoll
Torry/Ferryhill	Aberdeen Labour	Yvonne Allan
Torry/Ferryhill	Conservative	Alan Donnelly
Kincorth/Nigg/Cove	Aberdeen Labour	Sarah Duncan
Kincorth/Nigg/Cove	Conservative	Philip Sellar

=== Candidates ===
The total number of candidates fell from 101 in 2017 to 99. As was the case five years previous, the SNP fielded the highest number of candidates at 23 (two less than in 2017) across the 13 wards. The Conservatives overtook Labour by fielding 17 candidates – three more than five years previous. Labour, which had put forward 20 candidates in 2017, stood 15 candidates, all of whom used the "Aberdeen Labour" description. The 13 candidates fielded by the Liberal Democrats were one less than in 2017. For the first time in an Aberdeen City election, the Greens contested every ward by fielding 13 candidates – almost double the number they had put forward in 2017. The number of independent candidates fell from 13 to six, while two Libertarian candidates contested the election – an increase of one. Contesting elections in Aberdeen City for the first time were the Alba Party (four candidates), the Scottish Family Party (five) and the Trade Unionist and Socialist Coalition (TUSC) (one). Unlike the 2017 election, the United Kingdom Independence Party (UKIP), the National Front and Solidarity did not put forward any candidates.

== Results ==
2022 Aberdeen City Council election
Party	Seats	Gains	Losses	Net gain/loss	Seats %	Votes %	Votes	+/−
SNP	20	1	0	▲1	44.4	35.0	23,472	▲2.6
Labour	11	2	0	▲2	24.4	17.5	11,731	▼0.2
Conservative	8	0	3	▼3	17.8	21.5	14,424	▼3.2
Liberal Democrats	4	1	1	Steady	8.9	14.0	9,404	▼1.2
Independent	2	1	1	Steady	4.4	5.3	3,569	▼2.1
Green	0	0	0	Steady	0.0	5.1	3,414	▲2.9
Alba	0	0	0	Steady	0.0	0.7	464	New
Scottish Family	0	0	0	Steady	0.0	0.6	419	New
Scottish Libertarian	0	0	0	Steady	0.0	0.1	56	▲0.1
TUSC	0	0	0	Steady	0.0	0.0	38	New
Total	45						66,991	

Note: Votes are the sum of first preference votes across all council wards. The net gain/loss and percentage changes relate to the result of the previous Scottish local elections on 4 May 2017. This is because STV has an element of proportionality which is not present unless multiple seats are being elected. This may differ from other published sources showing gain/loss relative to seats held at the dissolution of Scotland's councils.

=== Ward summary ===
2022 Aberdeen City Council election results by ward
Ward	%	Seats	%	Seats	%	Seats	%	Seats	%	Seats	%	Seats	Total
Ward	SNP		Lab		Con		Lib Dem		Ind		Others		Total
Dyce/Bucksburn/Danestone	41.3	2	17.8	1	26.2	1	8.8	0			5.9	0	4
Bridge of Don	40.4	2	15.3	1	29.1	1	10.9	0			4.4	0	4
Kingswells/Sheddocksley/Summerhill	33.1	1	13.6	1	12.0	0	37.4	1			3.9	0	3
Northfield/Mastrick North	53.3	2	26.3	1	10.2	0	4.1	0			4.2	0	3
Hilton/Woodside/Stockethill	44.4	2	24.6	1	17.1	0	6.3	0			7.6	0	3
Tillydrone/Seaton/Old Aberdeen	43.3	2	25.7	1	13.3	0	4.5	0	2.9	0	9.8	0	3
Midstocket/Rosemount	37.8	1	21.5	1	24.5	1	7.0	0			9.3	0	3
George Street/Harbour	42.2	2	19.8	1	10.9	0	11.4	1	1.8	0	13.8	0	4
Lower Deeside	15.3	0	23.8	1	30.1	1	4.6	0	21.7	1	4.5	0	3
Hazlehead/Queens Cross/Countesswells	18.4	1	6.3	0	25.4	1	25.4	1	20.9	1	3.6	0	4
Airyhall/Broomhill/Garthdee	27.5	1	10.7	0	21.1	1	36.5	1			4.2	0	3
Torry/Ferryhill	39.8	2	17.3	1	19.4	1	6.4	0	6.3	0	10.8	0	4
Kincorth/Nigg/Cove	45.7	2	18.8	1	21.1	1	6.5	0			7.7	0	4
Total	35.0	20	17.5	11	21.6	8	14.0	4	5.3	2	6.3	0	45

=== Seats changing hands ===
Below is a list of seats which elected a different party or parties from 2017 in order to highlight the change in political composition of the council from the previous election. The list does not include defeated incumbents who resigned or defected from their party and subsequently failed re-election while the party held the seat.

Seats changing hands
Seat	2017		2022	
Seat	Party	Member	Party	Member
Bridge of Don	Independent	John Reynolds	Labour	Nurul Hoque Ali
Kingswells/Sheddocksley/Summerhill	Conservative	John Wheeler	Labour	Kate Blake
Hilton/Woodside/Stockethill	Conservative	Freddie John	SNP	Hazel Cameron
George Street/Harbour	Conservative	Ryan Houghton	Liberal Democrats	Desmond Bouse
Hazlehead/Queens Cross/Countesswells	Liberal Democrats	Jennifer Stewart	Independent	Jennifer Stewart

Notes

1. Note 1: In 2017, Cllr Stewart was elected as a Liberal Democrat candidate but later resigned from the party.

== Ward results ==
=== Dyce/Bucksburn/Danestone ===
The SNP (2), Labour (1) and the Conservatives (1) retained the seats they had won at the previous election.

Dyce/Bucksburn/Danestone – 4 seats
Party	Candidate	FPv%	Count						
Party	Candidate	FPv%	1	2	3	4	5	6	7
SNP	Gill Al-Samarai (incumbent)	23.3	1,538						
Conservative	Avril MacKenzie (incumbent)	21.0	1,387						
SNP	Neil MacGregor (incumbent)	18.0	1,188	1,362					
Labour	Barney Crockett (incumbent) (Note: Cllr Crockett resigned from Labour in June 2023 to sit as an independent.)	17.8	1,174	1,184	1,187	1,193	1,207	1,311	1,408
Liberal Democrats	Peter Heald	8.8	579	584	587	592	608	717	850
Conservative	Braiden Smith	5.2	341	341	397	398	419	433	
Green	William Ball	4.5	296	312	312	327	345		
Scottish Family	Amy-Marie Stratton	1.4	95	96	96	98			
Electorate: 16,446 Valid: 6,598 Spoilt: 168 Quota: 1,320 Turnout: 41.1%

=== Bridge of Don ===
The SNP (2) and the Conservatives (1) retained the seats they had won at the previous election while Labour gained one seat from an independent.

Bridge of Don – 4 seats
Party	Candidate	FPv%	Count							
Party	Candidate	FPv%	1	2	3	4	5	6	7	8
SNP	Alison Alphonse (incumbent)	24.3	1,649							
Conservative	Sarah Cross (incumbent)	23.5	1,594							
SNP	Jessica Mennie (incumbent)	16.1	1,094	1,339	1,341	1,347	1,450			
Labour	Nurul Hoque Ali	15.3	1,040	1,053	1,066	1,076	1,118	1,136	1,246	1,708
Liberal Democrats	Mevrick Renson Fernandes	10.9	739	748	762	783	833	852	1,033	
Conservative	Matthew Watt	5.6	379	380	564	578	583	585		
Green	Sylvia Hardie	3.1	210	220	221	226				
Scottish Family	Harald Rainer Bartl	1.3	88	88	90					
Electorate: 15,216 Valid: 6,793 Spoilt: 137 Quota: 1,359 Turnout: 45.5%

=== Kingswells/Sheddocksley/Summerhill ===
The Liberal Democrats and the SNP retained the seats they had won at the previous election while Labour gained one seat from the Conservatives.

Kingswells/Sheddocksley/Summerhill – 3 seats
Party	Candidate	FPv%	Count						
Party	Candidate	FPv%	1	2	3	4	5	6	7
Liberal Democrats	Steve Delaney (incumbent)	37.4	1,778						
SNP	David John Cameron (incumbent)	26.6	1,265						
Labour	Kate Blake	13.6	644	786	793	802	851	1,033	1,364
Conservative	John Wheeler (incumbent)	12.0	571	698	699	728	742	758	
SNP	Sam Ochola	6.5	310	390	450	458	534		
Green	David John McGrath	2.6	124	179	183	199			
Scottish Family	Dawn Smith	1.3	60	76	77				
Electorate: 11,504 Valid: 4,752 Spoilt: 82 Quota: 1,189 Turnout: 42.0%

=== Northfield/Mastrick North ===
The SNP (2) and Labour (1) retained the seats they won at the previous election.

Northfield/Mastrick North – 3 seats
Party	Candidate	FPv%	Count				
Party	Candidate	FPv%	1	2	3	4	5
SNP	Donna Clark	43.2	1,586				
Labour	Gordon Graham (incumbent)	22.6	829	891	901	917	932
Conservative	Nestor Carlsen-Devereux	10.2	373	383	388	395	400
SNP	Ciarán McRae (incumbent)	10.1	370	857	860	908	964
Liberal Democrats	Sam Forman	4.1	151	167	173	177	199
Labour	Graeme Stephen Lawrence	3.7	136	145	148	153	156
Green	Louise McCafferty	2.7	100	114	118	122	
Alba	David Maitland	2.5	91	103	109		
TUSC	Lucas Smith Grant	1.0	38	42			
Electorate: 11,686 Valid: 3,674 Spoilt: 129 Quota: 919 Turnout: 32.5%

=== Hilton/Woodside/Stockethill ===
The SNP retained the seat they won at the previous election and gained one seat from the Conservatives while Labour retained their only seat.

Hilton/Woodside/Stockethill – 3 seats
Party	Candidate	FPv%	Count						
Party	Candidate	FPv%	1	2	3	4	5	6	7
SNP	Hazel Cameron	31.1	1,333						
Labour	Deena Tissera	23.8	1,022	1,033	1,050				
Conservative	Freddie John (incumbent)	16.6	711	713	731	732	748	847	
SNP	Neil Copland (incumbent)	11.9	511	762	778	781	875	943	1,080
Liberal Democrats	Sam Petchey	6.1	261	263	277	280	346		
Green	Peter Kennedy	4.9	209	220	240	241			
Scottish Family	Jakub Tomasz Kurpanik	2.5	107	108					
Electorate: 11,018 Valid: 4,154 Spoilt: 137 Quota: 1,039 Turnout: 38.9%

=== Tillydrone/Seaton/Old Aberdeen ===
The SNP (2) and Labour (1) retained the seats they won at the previous election.

Tillydrone/Seaton/Old Aberdeen – 3 seats
Party	Candidate	FPv%	Count									
Party	Candidate	FPv%	1	2	3	4	5	6	7	8	9	10
SNP	Alexander McLellan (incumbent)	34.8	911									
Labour	Ross Grant (incumbent)	22.2	582	602	612	621	635	708				
Conservative	Vish Archer	10.7	281	283	293	301	315	321	327	357	375	
SNP	Kairin Van Sweeden	8.5	222	395	401	415	425	435	442	460	612	665
Green	Ashish Malik	7.3	192	205	215	226	237	245	251	282		
Liberal Democrats	Eileen Frances Delaney	4.5	118	121	125	130	135	145	154			
Labour	Shona Simpson	3.7	98	104	108	115	127					
Independent	Peter Nicol	2.9	77	85	94	103						
Scottish Family	Graham Charles Elder	2.6	69	72								
Alba	Robert Reid	2.5	66	74	80							
Electorate: 8,872 Valid: 2,616 Spoilt: 111 Quota: 655 Turnout: 30.7%

=== Midstocket/Rosemount ===
The SNP, Labour and the Conservatives retained the seats they won at the previous election.

Midstocket/Rosemount – 3 seats
Party	Candidate	FPv%	Count				
Party	Candidate	FPv%	1	2	3	4	5
SNP	Bill Cormie (incumbent)	27.0	1,264				
Conservative	Emma Farquhar	24.5	1,150	1,153	1,221		
Labour	Jennifer Bonsell	21.5	1,007	1,014	1,136	1,160	1,334
SNP	William MacKenzie	10.8	507	571	585	587	815
Green	Alex Jarvis	9.3	435	442	514	517	
Liberal Democrats	William Sell	7.0	326	328			
Electorate: 10,979 Valid: 4,689 Spoilt: 85 Quota: 1,173 Turnout: 43.5%

=== George Street/Harbour ===
The SNP (2) and Labour (1) retained the seats they won at the previous election while the Liberal Democrats gained a seat from the Conservatives.

George Street/Harbour – 4 seats
Party	Candidate	FPv%	Count						
Party	Candidate	FPv%	1	2	3	4	5	6	7
SNP	Michael Hutchison (incumbent)	22.2	762						
SNP	Dell Henrickson (incumbent)	20.0	684	745					
Labour	Sandra Macdonald (incumbent)	19.8	678	682	690				
Green	Guy Ingerson	13.8	474	478	506	507	521	548	
Liberal Democrats	Desmond Bouse	11.4	391	392	397	398	417	599	871
Conservative	Shane Painter	10.9	375	375	377	377	386		
Independent	Mac Ahmed Chaudry	1.8	63	63	66	66			
Electorate: 12,378 Valid: 3,427 Spoilt: 78 Quota: 686 Turnout: 28.3%

=== Lower Deeside ===
Labour, the Conservatives and independent candidate Marie Boulton retained the seats they won at the previous election.

Lower Deeside – 3 seats
Party	Candidate	FPv%	Count				
Party	Candidate	FPv%	1	2	3	4	5
Labour	M. Tauqeer Malik (incumbent)	23.8	1,640	1,698	1,804		
Independent	Marie Boulton (incumbent)	21.7	1,496	1,524	1,622	1,651	1,733
Conservative	Duncan Massey (Note: Cllr Massey defected to Reform UK in June 2025.)	17.3	1,194	1,197	1,232	1,242	2,009
SNP	Ewan Ritchie	15.3	1,051	1,192	1,234	1,247	1,252
Conservative	Gillian Tebberen	12.8	882	890	910	913	
Liberal Democrats	Sue Mulkerrin	4.6	316	363			
Green	Daniel Verhamme	4.5	307				
Electorate: 12,555 Valid: 6,886 Spoilt: 84 Quota: 1,722 Turnout: 55.5%

=== Hazlehead/Queens Cross/Countesswells ===
The Liberal Democrats retained one of their two seats and lost one to independent candidate Jennifer Stewart, while the Conservatives and the SNP retained the seats they won at the previous election. Cllr Stewart was elected as a Liberal Democrat councillor in 2017 but subsequently left her party to join the minority Conservative–Aberdeen Labour administration.

Hazlehead/Queens Cross/Countesswells – 4 seats
Party	Candidate	FPv%	Count						
Party	Candidate	FPv%	1	2	3	4	5	6	7
Liberal Democrats	Martin Greig (incumbent)	25.4	1,967						
Independent	Jennifer Stewart (incumbent)	20.9	1,618						
SNP	John Cooke (incumbent)	18.4	1,426	1,476	1,487	1,650			
Conservative	Ken McLeod	13.2	1,021	1,116	1,134	1,139	1,142	1,262	2,238
Conservative	Lars Frevert	12.2	941	1,003	1,011	1,017	1,020	1,123	
Labour	Mohamed Mosobbir	6.3	486	552	561	661	703		
Green	Becky Rafferty	3.6	277	319	324				
Electorate: 15,281 Valid: 7,736 Spoilt: 72 Quota: 1,548 Turnout: 51.1%

=== Airyhall/Broomhill/Garthdee ===
The Conservatives, the Liberal Democrats and the SNP retained the seats they won at the previous election.

Airyhall/Broomhill/Garthdee – 3 seats
Party	Candidate	FPv%	Count	
Party	Candidate	FPv%	1	2
Liberal Democrats	Ian Yuill (incumbent)	36.5	2,146	
SNP	Derek Davidson	27.5	1,615	
Conservative	Ryan Houghton	21.1	1,240	1,455
Labour	Logan Machell	10.7	627	802
Green	Harry Rafferty	4.2	244	345
Electorate: 11,842 Valid: 5,872 Spoilt: 55 Quota: 1,469 Turnout: 50.1%

=== Torry/Ferryhill ===
The SNP (2), Labour (1) and the Conservatives (1) retained the seats they had won at the previous election.

Torry/Ferryhill – 4 seats
Party	Candidate	FPv%	Count							
Party	Candidate	FPv%	1	2	3	4	5	6	7	8
SNP	Christian Allard (incumbent)	32.9	1,646							
Conservative	Michael Kusznir	19.4	970	975	982	988	996	1,023		
Labour	Simon Peter Watson	17.3	864	894	897	900	904	966	972	1,138
Green	Esme Houston	7.8	390	433	433	438	458	513	514	566
SNP	Lee Fairfull	6.9	344	824	825	833	891	928	929	950
Liberal Democrats	Gregor McAbery	6.4	318	327	329	336	339	372	379	
Independent	Simon McLean	4.8	238	247	252	305	331			
Alba	Brian Allan	2.5	123	142	146	148				
Independent	Paul Dawson	1.5	77	85	87					
Scottish Libertarian	Oren Katz	0.5	27	27						
Electorate: 15,012 Valid: 4,997 Spoilt: 123 Quota: 1,000 Turnout: 34.1%

=== Kincorth/Nigg/Cove ===
The SNP (2), Labour (1) and the Conservatives (1) retained the seats they won at the previous election.

Kincorth/Nigg/Cove – 4 seats
Party	Candidate	FPv%	Count			
Party	Candidate	FPv%	1	2	3	4
SNP	Alex Nicoll (incumbent)	30.5	1,465			
Conservative	Richard Brooks	21.1	1,014			
Labour	Lynn Thomson	18.9	904	917	949	966
SNP	Miranda Radley (incumbent)	15.2	731	1,171		
Liberal Democrats	Moira Henderson	6.5	314	321	335	350
Alba	Charlie Abel	3.8	184	191	222	223
Green	Heather Herbert	3.3	156	163	236	237
Scottish Libertarian	Bryce Hope	0.6	29	29	30	31
Electorate: 13,058 Valid: 4,797 Spoilt: 82 Quota: 960 Turnout: 37.4%

== Aftermath ==
On 18 May, a partnership was formed between the SNP group and the four Liberal Democrat councillors. David Cameron was made Provost, defeating Labour's Lynn Thomson by 25 votes to 9. The SNP's Alex Nicoll and the Liberal Democrats' Ian Yuill were named co-leaders of the council.

In May 2023, Cllr Christian Allard was elected as co-leader of the council in place of his party colleague Cllr Nicoll who had stood down from the role.

Cllr Barney Crockett, elected as a Labour councillor, left the party in June 2023 to sit as an independent.

In October 2024, Kincorth/Nigg/Cove councillor Alex Nicoll, a former co-leader of the council, resigned from the SNP to sit as an independent councillor.

Cllr Duncan Massey, elected as a Conservative councillor, defected to Reform UK in June 2025.

=== Dyce/Bucksburn/Danestone by-election ===
Conservative councillor Avril MacKenzie died on 1 December 2022. A by-election was held to fill the vacancy on 23 February 2023 and was won by Labour's Graeme Lawrence.

Dyce/Bucksburn/Danestone by-election (23 February 2023) – 1 seat
Party	Candidate	FPv%	Count							
Party	Candidate	FPv%	1	2	3	4	5	6	7	8
SNP	Tomasz Brzezinski	30.5	1,455	1,461	1,465	1,513	1,604	1,674	1,729	
Labour	Graeme Lawrence	25.7	1,227	1,233	1,255	1,282	1,306	1,459	1,971	2,596
Conservative	Akila Kanthaswamy	24.9	1,190	1,192	1,201	1,205	1,216	1,310		
Liberal Democrats	Mevrick Fernandes	9.4	452	460	464	480	491			
Alba	Charlie Abel	3.7	178	181	183	191				
Green	Sylvia Hardie	2.3	111	116	121					
Scottish Family	Amy-Marie Stratton	1.2	60	68						
Independent	Simon McLean	1.1	52							
Electorate: 16,926 Valid: 4,772 Spoilt: 47 Quota: 2,363 Turnout: 28.2%

=== George Street/Harbour by-election ===
In March 2026, Cllr Desmond Buchanan (elected as Desmond Bouse) announced his intention to resign as a councillor after moving to Edinburgh and working in Ayrshire. A by-election, held on 25 June 2026, was won by SNP candidate Leon Marwick.

George Street/Harbour by-election (25 June 2026) – 1 seat
Party	Candidate	FPv%	Count							
Party	Candidate	FPv%	1	2	3	4	5	6	7	8
SNP	Leon Marwick	33.1	583	587	590	597	629	673	694	896
Labour	Edward Obi	14.5	255	255	257	266	295	341	372	419
Green	Charlotte Horne	13.1	232	233	247	250	266	305	326	
Reform	Jordan Brown	10.0	177	179	183	211	214	230		
Independent	Aamir Azeem	9.2	162	163	163	168				
Liberal Democrats	Luke Eveling	9.2	162	162	164	195	205			
Conservative	Marco Oosthuizen	8.2	146	146	147					
TUSC	Fred Bayer	1.7	31	32						
AtLS	Konrad Rekas	0.7	13							
Electorate: 13,461 Valid: 1,761 Spoilt: 24 Quota: 881 Turnout: 13.3%

=== Midstocket/Rosemount by-election ===
In August 2026, Midstocket/Rosemount councillor Bill Cormie died. A by-election, held on 8 October 2026, was won by SNP candidate Jeff Diack.

Midstocket/Rosemount by-election (8 October 2026) – 1 seat
Party	Candidate	FPv%	Count							
Party	Candidate	FPv%	1	2	3	4	5	6	7	8
SNP	Jeff Diack	27.8	861	865	881	907	929	1,148	1,322	1,454
Conservative	Freddie John	24.0	743	744	747	770	918	927	1,042	
Labour	Willie Young	17.3	535	537	545	605	618	693		
Green	Lauren Bird	10.6	330	335	349	382	391			
Reform	John McLeod	10.4	323	326	328	334				
Liberal Democrats	Sandy Stephen	6.2	192	199	216					
Independent	Kusum Singal	2.1	67	76						
Independent	Simon McLean	1.2	37							
Electorate: 11,768 Valid: 3,092 Spoilt: 33 Quota: 1,545 Turnout: 26.5%
