= Kingswells/Sheddocksley/Summerhill =

Council ward in Aberdeen, Scotland

- Aberdeen City Council
- Boundary of Kingswells/Sheddocksley/Summerhill in Aberdeen from 2017.
- Electorate: 11,504

Current ward
- Created: 2017
- Councillor: Steve Delaney (Lib Dem)
- Councillor: David John Cameron (SNP)
- Councillor: Kate Blake (Labour)

Kingswells/Sheddocksley/Summerhill is an electoral ward in Aberdeen. It is one of the thirteen wards used to elect members of the Aberdeen City Council and is currently represented by Steve Delaney of the Liberal Democrats, David John Cameron of the Scottish National Party and Kate Blake of the Labour Party.

== Councillors ==
Election	Councillors		
2017	Steve Delaney (Liberal Democrats)	David John Cameron (SNP)	John Wheeler (Conservative)
2022	Steve Delaney (Liberal Democrats)	David John Cameron (SNP)	Kate Blake (Labour)

== Election results ==
=== 2022 election ===
Kingswells/Sheddocksley/Summerhill – 3 seats
Party	Candidate	FPv%	Count						
Party	Candidate	FPv%	1	2	3	4	5	6	7
Liberal Democrats	Steve Delaney (incumbent)	37.4	1,778						
SNP	David John Cameron (incumbent)	26.6	1,265						
Labour	Kate Blake	13.6	644	786	793	802	851	1,033	1,364
Conservative	John Wheeler (incumbent)	12.0	571	698	699	728	742	758	
SNP	Sam Ochola	6.5	310	390	450	458	534		
Green	David John McGrath	2.6	124	179	183	199			
Scottish Family	Dawn Smith	1.3	60	76	77				
Electorate: 11,504 Valid: 4,752 Spoilt: 82 Quota: 1,189 Turnout: 42.0%

=== Elections in the 2010s ===
Aberdeen City Council election: 4 May 2017
Party	Candidate	FPv%	Count						
Party	Candidate	FPv%	1	2	3	4	5	6	7
Liberal Democrats	Steve Delaney *	36.2	1,825						
SNP	David John Cameron *	17.7	895	972.5	974.8	997.8	1,668.7		
Conservative	John Wheeler	15.8	797	951.8	979.9	1,000.8	1,009	1,033.3	1,341.6
Labour	Barry Mitchell	13.7	690	767.8	779	818.1	848.7	952.7	
SNP	Josh Mennie	13.4	678	722.8	731.3	769.7			
Green	Pippa Robertson	1.8	90	149.6	159.4				
UKIP	Philip Clarke	1.4	68	77.5					
Electorate: TBC Valid: 5,043 Spoilt: 85 Quota: 1,261 Turnout: 5,128 (45.5%)
