= Callum McCaig =

Scottish National Party politician

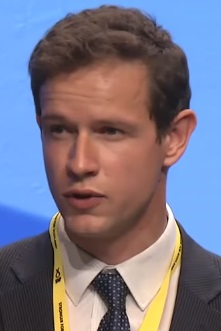
- McCaig in 2015

Chief Executive Officer of the Scottish National Party
- Incumbent
- Assumed office 21 September 2025
- Leader: John Swinney
- Preceded by: Carol Beattie

Member of Parliament for Aberdeen South
- In office 8 May 2015 – 3 May 2017
- Preceded by: Anne Begg
- Succeeded by: Ross Thomson

Leader of Aberdeen City Council
- In office 2011–2012

Personal details
- Born: 6 January 1985 (age 41) Aberdeen, Scotland
- Party: Scottish National Party
- Education: University of Edinburgh

Callum McCaig (born 6 January 1985) is a Scottish National Party (SNP) politician who was Member of Parliament for Aberdeen South from May 2015 until 2017. During his period in the Westminster parliament, he was the SNP's Energy and Climate Change spokesperson in the House of Commons. McCaig was elected as a councillor on Aberdeen City Council in 2007, and was the Leader of Aberdeen City Council from 2011 until 2012. He was appointed as Chief Executive of the SNP in September 2025 following the resignation of Carol Beattie.

== Early life ==
Born in Aberdeen, he was educated at Cults Academy, before studying at the University of Edinburgh, where he graduated with an MA (Hons) in Politics. He then worked for the SNP MSP Maureen Watt as a Parliamentary Assistant.

== Political career ==
McCaig was first elected to Aberdeen City Council in 2007, topping the polling in the Kincorth/Loirston ward with 1,883 first preferences and taking the first seat exceeding the quota. Following the election, the Scottish Liberal Democrats formed a coalition with the SNP to run the Council. On 23 May 2011, McCaig took over as leader of the SNP group on the council. After two by-election victories during 2011, the SNP became the largest party on the council, and in June 2011, their then Council leader stepped down to become Deputy Council leader. As a result, McCaig, who had been acting as Deputy Council leader, became leader of Aberdeen City Council on 28 June 2011. At the time, aged 26, he was one of the youngest council leaders in the United Kingdom.

He was re-elected as a councillor in 2012. After the elections, he remained the group leader of an enlarged SNP delegation, but was no longer the council leader, after the Scottish Labour group formed an administration with the support of the Conservatives and independents.

McCaig was elected as the Member of Parliament for Aberdeen South at the 2015 general election, where he won the seat from Labour's Anne Begg with a 20% swing. However, at the 2017 general election, he lost to Conservative candidate Ross Thomson. McCaig was subsequently appointed as a special adviser to SNP leader and First Minister Nicola Sturgeon.

On 21 September 2025, McCaig was appointed chief executive of the Scottish National Party.

Parliament of the United Kingdom
Preceded by Anne Begg	Member of Parliament for Aberdeen South; 2015–2017	Succeeded by Ross Thomson
