= Northfield/Mastrick North =

Electoral subdivision in Scotland

- Aberdeen City Council
- Boundary of Northfield/Mastrick North in Aberdeen from 2017.
- Electorate: 11,686

Current ward
- Created: 2017
- Councillor: Donna Clark (SNP)
- Councillor: Ciaran McRae (SNP)
- Councillor: Gordon Graham (Labour)

Northfield/Mastrick North is one of the thirteen wards used to elect members of the Aberdeen City Council. It elects three Councillors.

== Councillors ==
Election	Councillors		
2017	Jackie Dunbar (SNP)	Ciaran McRae (SNP)	Gordon Graham (Labour)
2022	Donna Clark (SNP)	Ciaran McRae (SNP)	Gordon Graham (Labour)

== Election results ==
=== 2022 election ===
Northfield/Mastrick North – 3 seats
Party	Candidate	FPv%	Count				
Party	Candidate	FPv%	1	2	3	4	5
SNP	Donna Clark	43.2	1,586				
Labour	Gordon Graham (incumbent)	22.6	829	891	901	917	932
Conservative	Nestor Carlsen-Devereux	10.2	373	383	388	395	400
SNP	Ciarán McRae (incumbent)	10.1	370	857	860	908	964
Liberal Democrats	Sam Forman	4.1	151	167	173	177	199
Labour	Graeme Stephen Lawrence	3.7	136	145	148	153	156
Green	Louise McCafferty	2.7	100	114	118	122	
Alba	David Maitland	2.5	91	103	109		
TUSC	Lucas Smith Grant	1.0	38	42			
Electorate: 11,686 Valid: 3,674 Spoilt: 129 Quota: 919 Turnout: 32.5%

=== Elections in the 2010s ===
Aberdeen City Council election: 4 May 2017
Party	Candidate	FPv%	Count							
Party	Candidate	FPv%	1	2	3	4	5	6	7	8
SNP	Jackie Dunbar*	39.9%	1,747							
Labour	Gordon Graham *‡	15.8%	692	728.1	740.5	779.9	885.5	902.8	911.07	1,551.3
Labour	Frank Gilfeather	14.4%	629	655.8	661.8	693.2	788.6	798.8	809.9	
Conservative	Alan Martin	8.6%	376	379.7	395.7	430.6				
SNP	Ciaran McRae	8.4%	370	742.6	748.5	764.7	776.2	1,206.7		
SNP	Jessica Mennie	7.6%	333	486.5	494.01	502.9	516.2			
Liberal Democrats	Sam Forman	3.5%	154	169.7	188.02					
Independent	Faith Robertson-Foy	1.8%	81	86.2						
Electorate: TBC Valid: 4,382 Spoilt: 180 Quota: 1,096 Turnout: 4,562 (37.2%)
