= Carol Beattie =

Former Chief Executive Officer of the Scottish National Party

Chief Executive Officer of the Scottish National Party
- In office 10 March 2025 – 21 September 2025; Acting: 12 October 2024 – 10 March 2025
- Leader: John Swinney
- Preceded by: Murray Foote
- Succeeded by: Callum McCaig

Personal details
- Party: Scottish National Party

Carol Beattie is a Scottish civil servant and former chief executive of Stirling Council, who was appointed as chief executive of the Scottish National Party (SNP) in March 2025.

Beattie joined Stirling Council in 2014 as Senior Manager for Economic Development. She later took on the post of Director of Children, Communities and Enterprise, then Deputy Chief Executive. She was appointed the council's Chief Executive in 2018, holding the post until May 2024, when she stepped down in order to take on a role in the private sector.

Following the resignation of Murray Foote as the SNP's chief executive in October 2024, Beattie was appointed as the party's acting chief executive. One of her tasks as interim chief executive was to oversee a number of redundancies at the party's Edinburgh headquarters, a move that was part of a process of internal reforms to the organisation. On 10 March 2025, it was announced that she had been appointed to the post on a permanent basis. In her role, she planned to oversee the party's election campaign for the 2026 Scottish Parliament election, but later resigned for personal health reasons. Beattie was replaced by former SNP politician Callum McCaig who assumed the role on 21 September 2025.
