= Ross Thomson =

Scottish Conservative politician (born 1987)

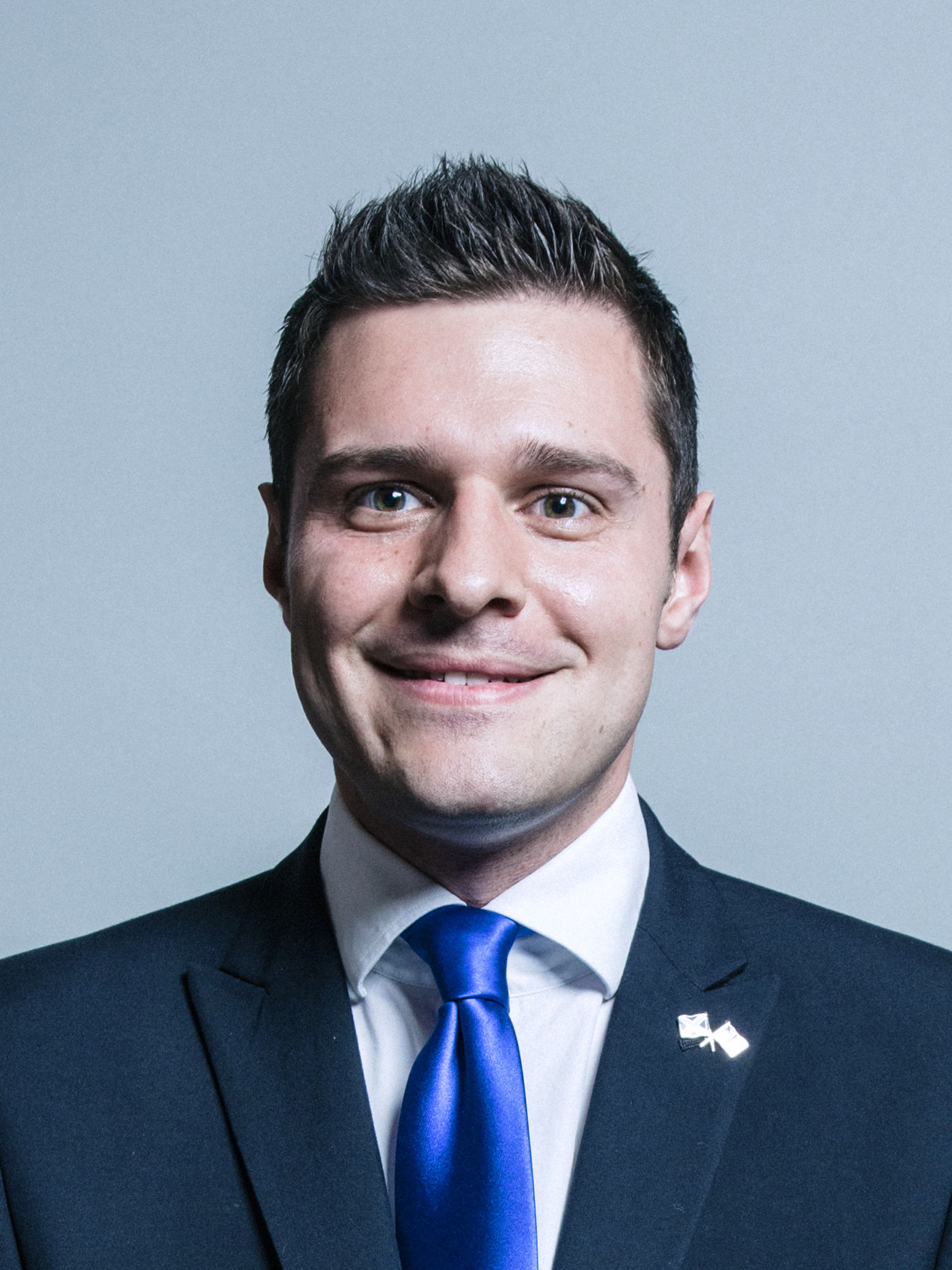
- Official portrait, 2017

Member of Parliament for Aberdeen South
- In office 8 June 2017 – 6 November 2019
- Preceded by: Callum McCaig
- Succeeded by: Stephen Flynn

Member of the Scottish Parliament for North East Scotland (1 of 7 Regional MSPs)
- In office 5 May 2016 – 12 June 2017
- Succeeded by: Tom Mason (Note: Normally, regional MSPs do not have individual predecessors and successors. However, Thomson stood down during a sitting parliament so was succeeded by Mason.)

Personal details
- Born: 21 September 1987 (age 38) Aberdeen, Scotland
- Party: Independent (since 2026)
- Other political affiliations: Conservative (until 2025); Reform UK (2025-2026)
- Domestic partner: Douglas Mathewson (2013–2018)
- Education: University of Aberdeen
- Occupation: Politician
- Website: rossthomson.org.uk

Ross Thomson (born 21 September 1987) is a former Scottish Conservative Party politician who was the Member of Parliament (MP) for Aberdeen South from 2017 to 2019. Thomson was the first Conservative MP elected for Aberdeen South since the 1992 general election, 25 years earlier. He was a Member of the Scottish Parliament (MSP) for the North East Scotland region from May 2016 until June 2017. He was elected to Aberdeen City Council in the 2012 local elections.

He defected to Reform UK in June 2025, but left the party in May 2026.

== Early life ==
Thomson was born in Aberdeen and educated locally at Bridge of Don Academy. He studied Politics and International Relations at the University of Aberdeen, graduating with a first class MA (Hons) degree in 2009.

Prior to entering politics, Thomson worked as a store trainer for department store Debenhams.

== Political career ==
He stood for the Scottish Parliament at the 2007 elections for the Coatbridge and Chryston constituency, coming third behind Labour MSP Elaine Smith and the Scottish National Party candidate. He was also third in Aberdeen Donside in 2011.

At the United Kingdom general election in 2010, Thomson was selected as the Conservative Party candidate for the Scottish constituency of Gordon, and finished in fourth place, receiving 9,111 votes. He was the youngest Conservative Party candidate for the House of Commons. He was elected to the Aberdeen City Council at the 2012 election.

Thomson contested the Aberdeen Donside by-election in 2013, finishing in fourth place. He stood as the Conservatives' candidate in Aberdeen South during the 2015 general election, but was unsuccessful, and subsequently stood in the Aberdeen South and North Kincardine constituency at the 2016 Scottish Parliament election. Although the Scottish National Party's Maureen Watt retained the latter seat, Thomson was elected through the Additional Member System as one of the seven representatives of the North East Scotland region.

During his time as a Member of the Scottish Parliament, Thomson was the Scottish Conservative spokesperson for Further Education, Higher Education and Science, and sat on the Education and Skills Committee. Thomson also became a spokesman for Vote Leave in Scotland during the 2016 United Kingdom European Union membership referendum as one of the few members of the Scottish Parliament supporting a leave vote.

On 5 October 2016, Thomson repaid expenses relating to a night's stay in an Edinburgh hotel with a male friend, Braden Davy, whom he subsequently hired over the objections of the Tory chief whip.

On 8 June 2017, Thomson became the Member of Parliament for Aberdeen South, defeating incumbent Callum McCaig, with 18,746 votes, a 19.3% swing and a majority of 4,752. He stood down from his seat as an MSP after being elected as a Westminster MP. after entering the UK Parliament, Thomson became known as a "hardline" supporter of Brexit.

In April 2018, Thomson was criticised for posts made on his private social media account whilst visiting Baghdad. Thomson was accused of trivialising the dictatorship of Saddam Hussein when he posed for photos at Hussein's military parade ground. A Scottish Conservative spokesman said: "Ross has already made clear he did not intend to cause any offence and apologises to anyone who has been upset."

He supported Boris Johnson in the 2019 Conservative leadership election and became his campaign manager in Scotland. After the 2022 vote of confidence in the Conservative Party leadership of Boris Johnson Thomson, no longer an MP, described Johnson as "wounded" and called on him to "build bridges" with the Scottish party.

In June 2025 Thomson announced he had defected to Reform UK, saying "only Reform have the courage and answers to the issues facing Scotland and the United Kingdom", but left the party in May 2026 following allegations that he was blocked from being the party's candidate at the 2026 Peterhead by-election. On 27 May, Thomson announced that he would be participating in the Peterhead by-election as an independent candidate. He ultimately finished in fifth place with 132 first preference votes, compared to the successful Scottish National Party candidate Angus Matheson, on 741 votes.

Thomson publicly endorsed Conservative candidate Douglas Lumsden for the 2026 Aberdeen South by-election.

== Post-parliamentary career ==
After stepping down as an MP, Thomson has worked as a public affairs and campaign manager for the Earl Haig Fund Scotland (also known as Poppyscotland). It was revealed in April 2025 that he was working for one of Donald Trump's firms, Trump International resort in Balmedie, Aberdeenshire.

== Personal life ==
Thomson entered into a civil partnership with his partner in November 2013, which lasted until 2018.

On 29 November 2018, Callum Purdie was convicted at Aberdeen Sheriff Court of causing a disturbance at the constituency office of Thomson. The following month, Purdie, who was not one of Thomson's constituents, was ordered to stay away from Thomson's office and his staff for two years.

=== Sexual misconduct allegations ===
On 6 February 2019, various newspapers reported that Thomson had been escorted by police from the Strangers' Bar of the House of Commons the previous evening. Initial reports indicated that police had attended following reports of sexual assault of patrons by the MP. Eyewitnesses claimed that Thomson had repeatedly groped several young men also present in the bar, grabbing their bottoms and genitals. A Conservative Party investigation is yet to conclude, but the Parliamentary Commissioner on Standards dismissed the complaint. Thomson denied any wrongdoing, citing the allegations as politically motivated.

On 3 November 2019 MP Paul Sweeney accused Thomson of sexual assault in the Strangers' Bar in October 2018. The same day Thomson announced that he would not stand for re-election as the Member of Parliament for Aberdeen South, denying the allegation and stating that it had made his life 'a living hell'. It later emerged that the chairman of Thomson's local Conservative Association had refused to sign the nomination papers to allow him to stand as a Conservative candidate in the December 2019 general election.

In October 2020, the Parliamentary Commissioner for Standards "concluded that Thomson's behaviour was not sexual in nature and cleared him of any breach of parliament's misconduct policy".

== Notes ==
Parliament of the United Kingdom
Preceded by Callum McCaig	Member of Parliament for Aberdeen South; 2017–2019	Succeeded by Stephen Flynn
