= Hilton/Woodside/Stockethill =

Council ward in Aberdeen, Scotland

- Aberdeen City Council
- Boundary of Hilton/Woodside/Stockethill in Aberdeen from 2017.
- Electorate: 11,018

Current ward
- Created: 2017
- Councillor: Neil Copland (SNP)
- Councillor: Hazel Cameron (SNP)
- Councillor: Deena Tissera (Labour)

Hilton/Woodside/Stockethill is one of the thirteen wards used to elect members of the Aberdeen City Council. It elects three Councillors.

== Councillors ==
Election	Councillors		
2017	Neil Copland (SNP)	Freddie John (Conservative)	Lesley Dunbar (Labour)
2022	Neil Copland (SNP)	Hazel Cameron (SNP)	Deena Tissera (Labour)

== Election results ==
=== 2022 election ===
Hilton/Woodside/Stockethill – 3 seats
Party	Candidate	FPv%	Count						
Party	Candidate	FPv%	1	2	3	4	5	6	7
SNP	Hazel Cameron	31.1	1,333						
Labour	Deena Tissera	23.8	1,022	1,033	1,050				
Conservative	Freddie John (incumbent)	16.6	711	713	731	732	748	847	
SNP	Neil Copland (incumbent)	11.9	511	762	778	781	875	943	1,080
Liberal Democrats	Sam Petchey	6.1	261	263	277	280	346		
Green	Peter Kennedy	4.9	209	220	240	241			
Scottish Family	Jakub Tomasz Kurpanik	2.5	107	108					
Electorate: 11,018 Valid: 4,154 Spoilt: 137 Quota: 1,039 Turnout: 38.9%

=== Elections in the 2010s ===
2017 Aberdeen City Council election
Party	Candidate	FPv%	Count							
Party	Candidate	FPv%	1	2	3	4	5	6	7	8
SNP	Neil Copland *	25.3%	1,148							
Conservative	Freddie John	19.6%	889	889.2	914.2	933.2	991.2	1,019.2	1,039.7	1,235.2
Labour	Lesley Dunbar *‡	18%	818	818.9	843.9	870.9	913.9	1,252.9		
SNP	Lauren Wards	16.1%	729	738.9	761.09	829.4	884.5	906.7	925.03	
Labour	Lewis MacLeod	8.1%	369	369.3	379.3	393.3	445.3			
Liberal Democrats	Sam Petchey	4.8%	219	219.2	248.2	308.3				
Green	Peter Kennedy	4.1%	186	186.5	223.5					
Independent	David Page Henderson	3.9%	179	179.4						
Electorate: TBC Valid: 4,537 Spoilt: 137 Quota: 1,135 Turnout: 4,674 (40.5%)
