= Kincorth/Nigg/Cove =

Council ward in Aberdeen, Scotland

- Aberdeen City Council
- Boundary of Kincorth/Nigg/Cove in Aberdeen from 2017.
- Electorate: 13,058

Current ward
- Created: 2015
- Councillor: Miranda Radley (SNP)
- Councillor: Alex Nicoll (SNP)
- Councillor: Richard Brooks (Scottish Conservative)
- Councillor: Lynn Thomson (Labour)

Kincorth/Nigg/Cove is one of the thirteen wards used to elect members of the Aberdeen City Council. It elects four Councillors.

== Councillors ==
Election	Councillors			
2015 by-election	Stephen Flynn (SNP)	Neil Cooney (Labour)	Andy Finlayson (Independent)	
2017	Stephen Flynn (SNP)	Alex Nicoll (SNP)	Philip Sellar (Conservative)	Sarah Duncan (Labour)
2020 by-election	Miranda Radley (SNP)	Alex Nicoll (SNP)	Philip Sellar (Conservative)	Sarah Duncan (Labour)
2022	Miranda Radley (SNP)	Alex Nicoll (SNP)	Richard Brooks (Conservative)	Lynn Thomson (Labour)

== Election results ==
=== 2022 election ===
Kincorth/Nigg/Cove – 4 seats
Party	Candidate	FPv%	Count			
Party	Candidate	FPv%	1	2	3	4
SNP	Alex Nicoll (incumbent)	30.5	1,465			
Conservative	Richard Brooks	21.1	1,014			
Labour	Lynn Thomson	18.9	904	917	949	966
SNP	Miranda Radley (incumbent)	15.2	731	1,171		
Liberal Democrats	Moira Henderson	6.5	314	321	335	350
Alba	Charlie Abel	3.8	184	191	222	223
Green	Heather Herbert	3.3	156	163	236	237
Scottish Libertarian	Bryce Hope	0.6	29	29	30	31
Electorate: 13,058 Valid: 4,797 Spoilt: 82 Quota: 960 Turnout: 37.4%

=== 2020 by-election ===
Kincorth/Nigg/Cove By-election (5 November 2020)
Party	Candidate	FPv%	Count							
Party	Candidate	FPv%	1	2	3	4	5	6	7	8
SNP	Miranda Radley	47.4	1,661	1,661	1,663	1,672	1,691	1,697	1,716	1,785
Conservative	Christopher Wyles	20.2	709	710	712	713	714	725	746	834
Labour	Shona Simpson	12.2	429	430	430	431	441	446	471	529
Independent	Andy Finlayson	10.5	367	368	368	374	383	419	451	
Liberal Democrats	Moira Henderson	3.6	128	132	132	133	140	148		
Independent	Simon McLean	2.5	92	93	97	99	104			
Green	Daniel Verhamme	1.7	58	60	61	63				
Independent	Lizette Belizzi Houston	0.9	31	32	34					
Independent	Sochima Iroh	0.5	16							
Scottish Libertarian	Bryce Hope	0.5	16							
Electorate: 13,130 Valid: 3,540 Spoilt: 33 Quota: 1,754 Turnout: 3,573 (27%)

=== 2017 election ===
2017 Aberdeen City Council election

Kincorth/Nigg/Cove – 4 seats
Party	Candidate	FPv%	Count							
Party	Candidate	FPv%	1	2	3	4	5	6	7	8
SNP	Stephen Flynn	27.0	1,396							
Conservative	Philip Sellar	21.5	1,113							
SNP	Alex Nicoll	13.7	707	1,020.3	1,023.08	1,041.9				
Labour	Sarah Duncan	11.4	590	595.7	601.9	615.5	615.9	670.9	960.07	1,198.6
Independent	Andy Finlayson	10.9	562	571.5	585.9	719.5	720.8	812.07	845.5	
Labour	Lynn Thomson	6.1	318	322.1	329.5	343.7	344.08	388.3		
Liberal Democrats	Cameron Finnie	5.2	270	273.09	286.2	305.3	305.9			
Independent	Finlay Crossan	4.3	220	224.1	232.9					
Electorate: TBC Valid: 5,176 Spoilt: 120 Quota: 1,036 Turnout: 5,296 (40.9%)

=== 2015 by-election ===
Kincorth/Nigg/Cove By-election (30 July 2015) - 1 Seat
Party	Candidate	FPv%	Count
Party	Candidate	FPv%	1
SNP	Stephen Flynn	60.5%	1,939
Labour	Donna Clark	18.9%	606
Conservative	Philip Patrick Sellar	9.8%	313
Liberal Democrats	Ken McLeod	6.5%	207
Green	Dan Yeats	3.6%	114
Electorate: 12,693 Valid: 3,205 Spoilt: 26 Quota: 1,590 Turnout: 3,231 (25.3%)
