= Jackie Dunbar =

Scottish National Party politician

Jackie Dunbar MSP
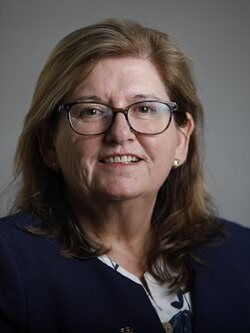
- Official portrait, 2026

Member of the Scottish Parliament for Aberdeen Donside
- Incumbent
- Assumed office 6 May 2021
- Preceded by: Mark McDonald
- Majority: 4,731 (15.5%)

Personal details
- Born: Peterhead, Aberdeenshire, Scotland
- Party: Scottish National Party

Jackie Dunbar is a Scottish National Party (SNP) politician. She has served as the Member of the Scottish Parliament (MSP) for Aberdeen Donside since May 2021.

Dunbar was born in Peterhead and educated in Elgin. She was elected to the Northfield (later Northfield/Mastrick North) ward of Aberdeen City Council in 2007, and held various senior posts on the council, including Deputy Provost and leader of the SNP group. In 2021, Dunbar was elected as a MSP for Aberdeen Donside, with her predecessor, independent MSP, Mark McDonald's not seeking re-election.

In November 2024, Dunbar was appointed as Deputy Convenor of the Education, Children and Young People Committee, holding the role for the remainder of the parliamentary term.

Dunbar was re-elected at the 2026 Scottish Parliament election and following the election was appointed as the SNP repsentative to the Scottish Parliamentary Corporate Body.

Scottish Parliament
Preceded by Mark McDonald	Member of the Scottish Parliament for Aberdeen Donside; 2021–present	Incumbent
