= Tom Mason (Scottish politician) =

Scottish politician

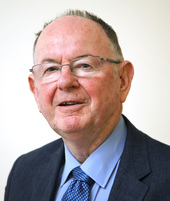

Member of the Scottish Parliament for North East Scotland (1 of 7 Regional MSPs)
- In office 20 June 2017 – 5 May 2021
- Preceded by: Ross Thomson

Personal details
- Born: Thomas Gee Mason; 31 December 1942 (age 83) Bishop's Stortford, Hertfordshire, England
- Party: Conservative
- Education: King's College London; Cranfield School of Management

Thomas Gee Mason (born 31 December 1942) is a retired Scottish Conservative Party politician, who was a Member of the Scottish Parliament (MSP) for the North East Scotland region from June 2017 to 2021.

== Background ==
He was educated at King's College London (BSc, 1964) and the Cranfield School of Management (MBA 1972).

== Political career ==
Mason first stood as the Scottish Conservative candidate for the Aberdeen Central constituency at the 1999 Scottish Parliament election, where finished in fourth place with 13.8% of the vote.

At the 2016 Scottish Parliament election, he stood again in Aberdeen Central, increasing the Conservatives' share of the vote in the constituency by 10.2%, and took third place. Mason was also placed tenth on the North East Scotland regional list.

In the 2017 Aberdeen council election he was elected to represent the Midstocket/Rosemount ward, then became depute Provost.

=== Member of the Scottish Parliament ===
Mason was sworn in to the Scottish Parliament, on 20 June 2017, following the resignation of Ross Thomson.

Mason stood down at the 2021 election.
