= 2012 Aberdeen City Council election =

2012 Scottish local government election

- 3 May 2012

All 43 seats to Aberdeen City Council 22 seats needed for a majority

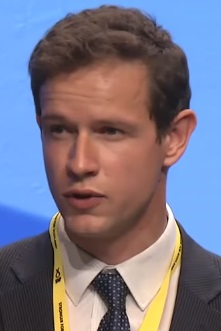

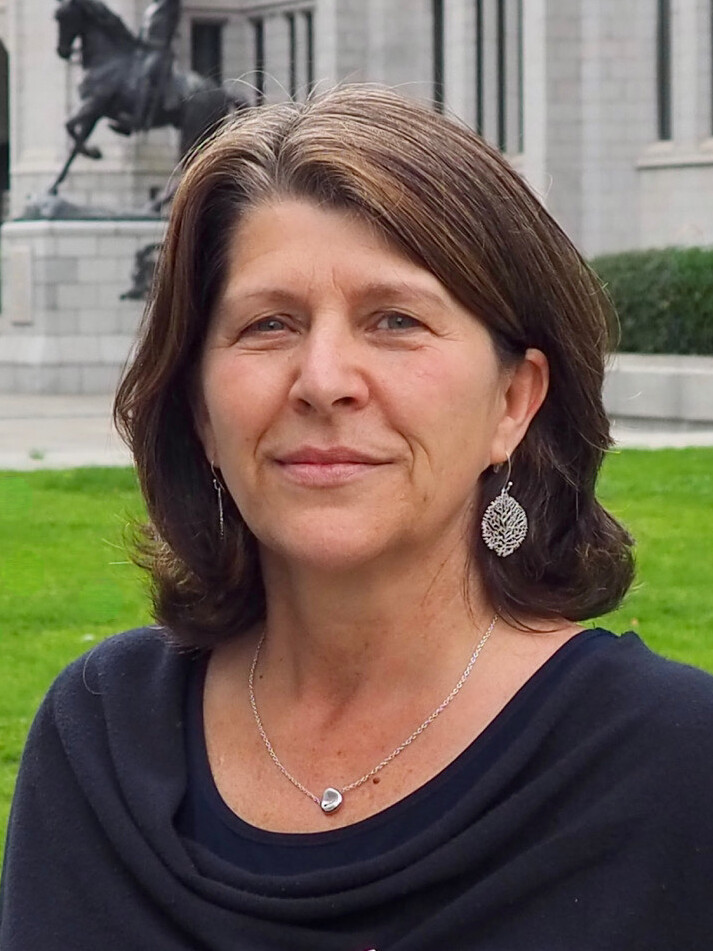
	First party	Second party	Third party
Leader	Barney Crockett	Callum McCaig	Aileen Malone
Party	Labour	SNP	Liberal Democrats
Leader's seat	Dyce/Bucksburn/Danestone	Kincorth/Loirston	Lower Deeside
Last election	10 seats, 23.3%	12 seats, 27.9%	15 seats, 34.9%
Seats before	8	15	11
Seats won	17	15	5
Seat change	▲7	▲3	▼10
Popular vote	16,264	17,131	8,293
Percentage	29.7%	31.3%	15.1%
Swing	▲6.4%	▲3.4%	▼19.8%
	Fourth party	Fifth party
Leader	Marie Boulton	Fraser Forsyth
Party	Independent	Conservative
Leader's seat	Lower Deeside	Midtsocket/Rosemount
Last election	1 seats, 2.3%	5 seats, 11.6%
Seats before	7	2
Seats won	3	3
Seat change	▲2	▼2
Popular vote	6,117	5,285
Percentage	11.2%	9.7%
Swing	▲8.9%	▼1.9%
- The 13 multi-member wards
Council Leader before election
Callum McCaig
SNP
Council Leader after election
Barney Crockett
Labour

The 2012 Aberdeen City Council election took place on 3 May 2012 to elect members of Aberdeen City Council. The election used the 13 wards created as a result of the Local Governance (Scotland) Act 2004, with each ward electing three or four Councillors using the single transferable vote system form of proportional representation, with 43 Councillors elected.

Local political activist Renee Slater caused controversy when she nominated a mannequin doll as 'Helena Torry' in the Hazlehead/Ashley/Queens Cross ward. This was withdrawn after being spotted and a report issued to Grampian Police. Slater was subsequently prosecuted.

The election saw the Scottish Liberal Democrats lose two-thirds of their councillors. The Scottish National Party made 3 gains, securing their by-election gains during the 2007–2012 term. However, it was Scottish Labour Party who proved the biggest winners with 7 gains and 17 total seats. Independents gained 2 seats while the Tories lost 2 seats.

On 9 May an agreement was reached to form a coalition. The coalition was formed between the Scottish Labour Party (17 seats), the Scottish Conservative and Unionist Party (3) and three Independent councillors.

== Election results ==
Aberdeen City local election result 2012
Party	Seats	Gains	Losses	Net gain/loss	Seats %	Votes %	Votes	+/−
Labour	17	7	0	+7	39.5	29.7	16,264	+5.1
SNP	15	4	1	+3	34.9	31.3	17,131	+1.8
Liberal Democrats	5	0	10	-10	11.6	15.1	8,293	-11.8
Independent	3	2	0	+2	7.0	11.17	6,117	+8.47
Conservative	3	0	2	-2	7.0	9.7	5,285	-4.4
Green	0	-	-	-	-	2.45	1,342	+0.85
National Front	0	-	-	-	-	0.45	249	+0.45
UKIP	0	-	-	-	-	0.11	58	New

Note: The net gain/loss and percentage changes relate to the result of the previous Scottish local elections on 3 May 2007. This may differ from other published sources showing gain/loss relative to seats held at dissolution of Scotland's councils.

== Ward results ==
=== Dyce/Bucksburn/Danestone ===
- 2007: 2xLib Dem; 1xLab; 1xSNP
- 2012: 2xSNP; 2xLab
- 2007-2012 Change: SNP and Lab gain one seat from Lib Dem

Dyce/Bucksburn/Danestone - 4 seats
Party	Candidate	FPv%	Count								
Party	Candidate	FPv%	1	2	3	4	5	6	7	8	9
Labour	Barney Crockett (incumbent)	29.4%	1,378								
SNP	Neil MacGregor (incumbent)	25.5%	1,198								
SNP	Gill Samarai	8.8%	412	419	513.1	525.7	536.4	544.1	948.6		
Conservative	Duncan Stewart	7.7%	360	367	370.3	380.7	402.6				
SNP	Caroline Elizabeth Little	7.6%	358	367.6	479.8	487.4	507.4	525.3			
Liberal Democrats	Brian Malone	7.5%	353	368.3	377.4	392.8	428.1	585.7	607.1	607.7	
Labour	Graeme Lawrence	7.3%	344	681.7	693.1	718.1	771	816.2	834.2	835.2	991.4
Independent	Angela Joss	3.7%	174	190.2	195.9	232.8					
Green	Rhonda Reekie	2.5%	117	128.1	134.9						
Electorate: 14,122 Valid: 4,694 Spoilt: 92 Quota: 939 Turnout: 4,786 (33.24%)

=== Bridge of Don ===
- 2007: 2xLib Dem; 1xSNP; 1xLab
- 2012: 2xSNP; 1xIndependent; 1xLab
- 2007-2012 Change: SNP and Independent gain one seat from Lib Dem

Bridge of Don - 4 seats
Party	Candidate	FPv%	Count								
Party	Candidate	FPv%	1	2	3	4	5	6	7	8	9
Independent	John Reynolds (incumbent)	28.0%	1,530								
SNP	Muriel Jaffrey (incumbent)	20.5%	1,119								
Labour	Willie Young (incumbent)	18.8%	1,031	1,085.9	1,087	1,112.5					
SNP	Sandy Stuart	9.5%	520	559.5	570.9	576.8	578.5	595.6	612.5	985.5	1,107.2
SNP	Graham Bennett	7.2%	396	418.2	425.3	433.9	434.8	449.4	465.1		
Liberal Democrats	Millie McLeod	6.2%	338	412.8	414.1	436.1	438.7	498.4	640.7	660.3	
Conservative	Francis Davidson Webster	6.1%	333	360.3	360.5	364.3	365.2	385.1			
Independent	Gordon A. Leslie (incumbent)	2.0%	107	217.6	218.5	238.4	241				
Green	Daniel Kenneth Juett	1.8%	97	107.2	107.5						
Electorate: 14,188 Valid: 5,471 Spoilt: 68 Quota: 1,095 Turnout: 5,539 (38.56%)

=== Kingswells/Sheddocksley ===
- 2007: 1xSNP; 1xLib Dem; 1xLab
- 2012: 1xSNP; 1xLib Dem; 1xLab
- 2007-2012: No change

Kingswells/Sheddocksley - 3 seats
Party	Candidate	FPv%	Count								
Party	Candidate	FPv%	1	2	3	4	5	6	7	8	9
SNP	David John Cameron	24.9%	928	936							
Liberal Democrats	Steve Delaney	21.5%	802	803	803.2	812.2	828.2	950.2			
Labour	Len Ironside (incumbent)	18.1%	675	677	677.2	679.2	700.2	719.2	723.7	798.5	1,259.3
Labour	Jason Butcher	13.4%	499	503	503.3	507.3	516.3	532.3	534.5	576.4	
SNP	Wendy Alison Stuart (incumbent)	10.1%	375	381	383.9	392.9	409.9	428	431.1		
Conservative	Steve Robertson	6.9%	256	257	257.1	270.1	280.1				
Independent	Barry James Thomson	2.2%	83	89	89	105					
UKIP	Philip Clarke	1.6%	58	64	64.1						
National Front	Dave MacDonald	1.4%	51								
Electorate: 3,798 Valid: 3,727 Spoilt: 71 Quota: 932 Turnout: (35.08%)

=== Northfield ===
- 2007: 2xSNP; 1xLab
- 2012: 2xLab; 1xSNP
- 2007-2012 Change: Lab gain one seat from SNP

Northfield - 3 seats
Party	Candidate	FPv%	Count					
Party	Candidate	FPv%	1	2	3	4	5	6
SNP	Jackie Dunbar (incumbent)	34.2%	1,314					
Labour	Gordon Graham (incumbent)	22.9%	879	893.5	911.5	924.3	945.3	1,079.3
Labour	Scott Carle	22.6%	869	886.1	892.1	910.9	934.2	1,089.5
SNP	Paula Helen Mann	13.9%	535	831.5	847.3	860.5	877	
Conservative	George Ross	2.3%	90	91.1	98.1	114.6		
National Front	Christopher Sean Willett	2.1%	80	81.3				
Liberal Democrats	David Evans	2.1%	79	84.4	85.6			
Electorate: 11,419 Valid: 3,846 Spoilt: 128 Quota: 962 Turnout: 3,974 (33.68%)

=== Hilton/Stockethill ===
- 2007: 1xSNP; 1xLab; 1xLib Dem
- 2012: 2xLab; 1xSNP
- 2007-2012 Change: Lab gain one seat from Lib Dem

Hilton/Stockethill - 3 seats
Party	Candidate	FPv%	Count										
Party	Candidate	FPv%	1	2	3	4	5	6	7	8	9	10	11
Labour	George Adam (incumbent)	37.8%	1,421										
SNP	Kirsty Blackman (incumbent)†††††	21.9%	823	851.1	857.4	861.8	870.8	890.8	934.5	934.8	960.2		
SNP	John Lind	13.6%	512	522.5	525.5	527.5	536.8	545.8	561.5	577.9	587.9	602.5	
Labour	Lesley Dunbar	7.2%	271	628.8	635.1	641.5	657.5	683.9	708.2	756.7	797.1	798.9	918.8
Conservative	Aric Gilinsky	5.4%	203	206.7	210.7	212.7	216.7	221.7	237.4	272.4			
Liberal Democrats	Brian Dean	3.9%	145	161.6	165.3	166.3	172.9	196.9	213.3				
Independent	David Page Henderson	2.7%	101	108.8	109.8	121.1	161.5	177.8					
Green	Elva Hills	2.6%	99	102	107	117.7	125.4						
Independent	Archibald Robertson	2.3%	87	97.5	100.8	113.5							
Independent	Douglas James Thomson	1.5%	55	58	59								
National Front	Claire Emma O'Rourke	1.1%	41	42.7									
Electorate: 10,254 Valid: 3,758 Spoilt: 315 Quota: 940 Turnout: 4,073 (36.65%)

=== Tillydrone/Seaton/Old Aberdeen ===
- 2007: 1xSNP; 1xLab; 1xLib Dem
- 2012: 2xLab; 1xSNP
- 2007-2012 Change: Lab gain one seat from Lib Dem

Tillydrone/Seaton/Old Aberdeen - 3 seats
Party	Candidate	FPv%	Count							
Party	Candidate	FPv%	1	2	3	4	5	6	7	8
Labour	Ross Grant	30.4%	846							
SNP	Jim Noble (incumbent)	25.5%	710							
Labour	Ramsay Milne	14.1%	392	513	513.6	516.9	527.7	560.5	614.4	724.4
SNP	Mike Park	7.8%	218	224.6	237.6	241.7	250.9	268.9	304.2	350.4
Green	Gina Ford	6.4%	179	182.4	182.6	185.6	199.8	244.4	290.9	
Independent	Norman Collie (incumbent)	5.8%	161	164.7	165	169	188.2			
Liberal Democrats	David Green	4.6%	129	133.5	133.7	133.7	171.8			
Conservative	Daniel Stephen McCroskrie	4.3%	119	121.1	121.2	123.2				
National Front	Mike Phillips	0.9%	25	25.9	25.9					
Electorate: 12,655 Valid: 2,779 Spoilt: 92 Quota: 695 Turnout: 2,871 (21.96%)

=== Midstocket/Rosemount ===
- 2007: 1xCon; 1xSNP; 1xLab;
- 2012: 1xLab; 1xSNP; 1xCon
- 2007-2012 Change: No change = Cons regain seat lost in by-election Aug 2007

Midstocket/Rosemount - 3 seats
Party	Candidate	FPv%	Count						
Party	Candidate	FPv%	1	2	3	4	5	6	7
Labour	Jenny Laing (incumbent)††	32.4%	1,247						
SNP	Bill Cormie (incumbent)	32.1%	1,233						
Conservative	Fraser Forsyth†††	13.8%	531	555.7	579.9	600.2	686.1	751.7	867.6
SNP	Iolanda Serci	6.9%	264	292.8	458.5	468.2	498.2	580.9	
Green	John Laing McCallum	6.4%	245	315.8	333.9	360.7	461.3		
Liberal Democrats	William Sell	6.4%	245	282.3	299.2	321.5			
Independent	Patrick McGuire	2.1%	82	102.8	112.2				
Electorate: 3,895 Valid: 3,847 Spoilt: 48 Quota: 962 Turnout: (33.38%)

=== George Street/Harbour ===
- 2007: 1xSNP; 1xLab; 1xLib Dem
- 2012: 2xLab; 1xSNP
- 2007-2012 Change: Lab gain one seat from Lib Dem

George Street/Harbour - 3 seats
Party	Candidate	FPv%	Count									
Party	Candidate	FPv%	1	2	3	4	5	6	7	8	9	10
SNP	Andrew May (incumbent)††††††	25.3%	672									
Labour	Jean Morrison	17.2%	456	456.5	457.5	457.5	458.5	475.5	521.5	534.9	597	710.2
Labour	Nathan Morrison	14.3%	381	381.3	382.3	385.3	386.3	391.3	414.3	443.8	494.8	570.9
Liberal Democrats	Kris Chapman	9.9%	262	262.2	262.2	263.2	265.2	328.2	383.2	419.8	464.9	
SNP	James Wiseman West	8.4%	224	229.3	230.3	237.3	238.3	248.3	268.4			
Independent	Jim Hunter (incumbent)	8.4%	222	222.2	224.2	228.2	244.2	266.2	296.2	327.7		
Green	Richie Brian	7.3%	194	194.2	195.2	197.2	203.2	217.2				
Conservative	Brian George Davidson	6.7%	178	178.1	179.1	179.1	181.1					
National Front	Ross Alexander Willett	1.1%	29	29	29							
Independent	Andrew Lovie	0.9%	26	26	32	33						
Independent	Andy Rudgely	0.5%	14	14								
Electorate: 12,991 Valid: 2,658 Spoilt: 76 Quota: 665 Turnout: 2,734 (20.46%)

=== Lower Deeside ===
- 2007: 1xLib Dem; 1xCon; 1xIndependent
- 2012: 1xIndependent; 1xLib Dem; 1xLab
- 2007-2012 Change: Lab gain one seat from Con

Lower Deeside - 3 seats
Party	Candidate	FPv%	Count					
Party	Candidate	FPv%	1	2	3	4	5	6
Independent	Marie Boulton (incumbent)	30.7%	1,520					
Liberal Democrats	Aileen Malone (incumbent)	15.3%	755	814.2	823.4	992.7	1,140.9	1,539.9
Labour	M. Tauqeer Malik	15.0%	744	779	789.4	841.2	1,007.5	1,068.9
Conservative	Raymond Murchie	14.4%	712	741.4	754.5	881.8	950.2	
SNP	Dorothy Janet McCaig	13.3%	659	677.4	684.9	739.4		
Independent	Peter Reiss	9.9%	490	568.6	621.3			
Independent	Andy Anderson	1.3%	64	94.7				
Electorate: 11,301 Valid: 4,944 Spoilt: 33 Quota: 1,237 Turnout: 4,977 (43.75%)

=== Hazlehead/Ashley/Queens Cross ===
- 2007: 2xLib Dem; 1xCon; 1xSNP
- 2012: 2xLib Dem; 1xCon; 1xSNP
- 2007-2012 Change: No change

Hazlehead/Ashley/Queens Cross - 4 seats
Party	Candidate	FPv%	Count							
Party	Candidate	FPv%	1	2	3	4	5	6	7	8
Liberal Democrats	Jennifer Stewart (incumbent)	25.5%	1,498							
Liberal Democrats	Martin Greig (incumbent)	23.8%	1,399							
Conservative	Ross Thomson	15.3%	899	962.9	1,005.7	1,012.9	1,017.2	1,186.1		
Labour	Sandra MacDonald	12.5%	738	777.9	805.6	864.1	873.6	922.3	923.3	
SNP	John Munro Corall *	10.8%	634	654.6	667.1	691.4	931.6	975.2	975.8	1,139.5
Independent	Jim Farquharson (incumbent)	5.6%	328	379.6	414.9	439.6	441.4			
SNP	Stephen Mark Flynn	4.2%	248	262.8	269.1	274				
Green	Peter Alexander Kennedy	2.4%	140	158.6	173.6					
Electorate: 13,658 Valid: 5,884 Spoilt: 65 Quota: 1,177 Turnout: 5,949 (43.08%)

- = Outgoing Councillor from a different Ward.

=== Airyhall/Broomhill/Garthdee ===
- 2007: 2xLib Dem; 1xCon
- 2012: 1xLib Dem; 1xLab; 1xSNP
- 2007-2012 Change: SNP and Lab gain one seat from Lib Dem and Con

Airyhall/Broomhill/Garthdee - 3 seats
Party	Candidate	FPv%	Count			
Party	Candidate	FPv%	1	2	3	4
Liberal Democrats	Ian Yuill (incumbent)	34.0%	1,626			
Labour	Angela Taylor	22.4%	1,073	1,157.6	1,193.9	1,260.9
SNP	Gordon Scott Townson (incumbent)	22.3%	1,065	1,139	1,164.9	1,222.6
Conservative	Bill Berry	15.2%	728	843	871.3	896.7
Green	Bex Holmes	3.1%	149	182.3	221.6	
Independent	Paul Briggs	2.9%	140	166.4		
Electorate: 11,858 Valid: 4,781 Spoilt: 47 Quota: 1,196 Turnout: 4,828 (40.32%)

=== Torry/Ferryhill ===
- 2007: 1xSNP; 1xLab; 1xLib Dem; 1xCon
- 2012: 2xSNP; 1xLab; 1xCon
- 2007-2012 Change: SNP gain one seat from Lib Dem

Torry/Ferryhill - 4 seats
Party	Candidate	FPv%	Count									
Party	Candidate	FPv%	1	2	3	4	5	6	7	8	9	10
Labour	Yvonne Allan (incumbent)	26.4%	1,134									
SNP	Graham Robert Dickson	16.5%	706	726.2	726.2	729.4	734.2	741.7	755.1	768.6	804.4	862.1
Conservative	Alan Donnelly (incumbent)†	15.3%	657	663.8	663.8	667.8	677.1	684.8	690.8	715.3	819.5	890.5
SNP	Jim Kiddie (incumbent)	14.4%	619	631.7	631.7	634.7	640.1	649.6	667.6	692.6	730.1	797.8
Labour	Kathryn Russell	8.0%	345	523.6	524.6	527.4	531.3	548.3	575.4	610.4	704.5	
Liberal Democrats	Richard Robertson *	7.7%	331	335.9	335.9	335.9	340.9	346.4	376.3	400.8		
Independent	David Fryer	3.9%	169	173.9	177.1	177.1	197.6	234.5	257			
Green	Andrew Reekie	3.1%	131	137.3	139.6	139.8	139.8	154.3				
Independent	Suzanne Kelly	2.1%	91	101.2	108.2	111.2	124.9					
Independent	William Brown	1.4%	61	67.3	71.3	72.3						
National Front	Billy Watson	0.5%	23	24.9	24.9							
Independent	Hamish Hay MacKay	0.5%	21	21.5								
Electorate: 14,625 Valid: 4,288 Spoilt: 118 Quota: 858 Turnout: 4,406 (29.32%)

- = Outgoing Councillor from a different Ward.

=== Kincorth/Loirston ===
- 2007: 1xSNP; 1xLib Dem; 1xLab
- 2012: 1xSNP; 1xLab; 1xIndependent
- 2007-2012 Change: Independent gain one seat from Lib Dem

Kincorth/Loirston - 3 seats
Party	Candidate	FPv%	Count						
Party	Candidate	FPv%	1	2	3	4	5	6	7
SNP	Callum McCaig (incumbent)††††	34.1%	1,389						
Labour	Neil Cooney (incumbent)	30.7%	1,250						
Independent	Andrew William Finlayson	11.6%	471	542.3	554.6	630.2	688.3	860.9	1,066.7
Liberal Democrats	Kate Dean (incumbent)	8.1%	331	372.9	382.9	403.2	468.8		
Labour	Eleanor Morrison	7.1%	291	366.3	544.3	560.7	589.8	681.9	
Conservative	Alan Martin	5.4%	219	234.2	237	240.6			
Independent	Neale Bothwell	2.9%	120	140	144.5				
Electorate: 11,848 Valid: 4,071 Spoilt: 78 Quota: 1,018 Turnout: 4,149 (34.36%)

== Post-Election Changes ==
- † In January 2014, Torry/Ferryhill Cllr Alan Donnelly was expelled from the Conservative Party group and sits as an Independent.
- †† In May 2014, Midstocket/Rosemount Cllr Jenny Laing replaced Dyce/Bucksburn/Danestone Cllr Barney Crockett as leader of the council.
- ††† In May 2014, Midstocket/Rosemount Cllr Fraser Forsyth resigned from the Conservative Party group and sat as an Independent Forsyth quits Aberdeen Tory party He announced his future resignation on 24 June 2015 as he would be moving with his family to York and formally resigned his seat on 30 July 2015.Aberdeen Tory councillor's resignation triggers by-election A by-election was held on 1 October 2015 and the by-election was won by the SNP's Alex Nicoll.
- †††† On 11 May 2015, Kincorth/Loirston SNP Cllr Callum McCaig resigned his seat on the council to concentrate on his duties as MP for Aberdeen South. Date announced for Aberdeen by-elections A by-election was held on 30 July 2015 and it was won by the SNP's Stephen Flynn.
- †††††On 11 May 2015, Hilton/Stockethill SNP Cllr Kirsty Blackman resigned her seat on the council to concentrate on her duties as MP for Aberdeen North.Date announced for Aberdeen by-elections A by-election was held on 30 July 2015 and it was won by the SNP's Neil Copeland.
- †††††† On 28 May 2015, George Street/Harbour SNP Cllr Andrew May announced he would resign his seat on the council in July 2015.Date announced for Aberdeen by-elections A by-election was held on 1 October 2015 and the seat was held by the SNP's Michael Hutchison.

== By-election since 2012 ==
Hilton/Woodside/Stockethill By-election (30 July 2015) - 1 Seat
Party	Candidate	FPv%	Count
Party	Candidate	FPv%	1
SNP	Neil Copland	54.5%	1,690
Labour	Charlie Pirie	24.9%	771
Conservative	Roy Alastair Begg	11.3%	350
Green	Peter Kennedy	4.2%	130
Liberal Democrats	Jonathan Waddell	4.1%	125
Electorate: 12,050 Valid: 3,099 Spoilt: 33 Quota: 1,534 Turnout: 3,132 (25.7%)

Kincorth/Nigg/Cove By-election (30 July 2015) - 1 Seat
Party	Candidate	FPv%	Count
Party	Candidate	FPv%	1
SNP	Stephen Flynn	60.5%	1,939
Labour	Donna Clark	18.9%	606
Conservative	Philip Patrick Sellar	9.8%	313
Liberal Democrats	Ken McLeod	6.5%	207
Green	Dan Yeats	3.6%	114
Electorate: 12,693 Valid: 3,205 Spoilt: 26 Quota: 1,590 Turnout: 3,231 (25.3%)

Midstocket/Rosemount By-election (1 October 2015) - 1 Seat
Party	Candidate	FPv%	Count			
Party	Candidate	FPv%	1	2	3	4
SNP	Alex Nicoll	40.9%	1,168	1,225	1,275	1,433
Conservative	Tom Mason	23.6%	672	687	771	927
Labour	Howard Gemmell	21.2%	605	629	692	
Liberal Democrats	Ken McLeod	8.3%	238	270		
Green	Jennifer Phillips	6.0%	170			
Electorate: 11,825 Valid: 2,853 Spoilt: 19 Quota: 1,427 Turnout: 2,872 (24.29%)

George Street/Harbour By-election (1 October 2015) - 1 Seat
Party	Candidate	FPv%	Count
Party	Candidate	FPv%	1
SNP	Michael Hutchison	51.2%	961
Labour	Mike Scott	26.1%	490
Conservative	Brian Davidson	10.4%	195
Green	Alex Jarvis	7.2%	136
Liberal Democrats	Euan Davidson	5.1%	96
Electorate: 12,179 Valid: 1,878 Spoilt: 20 Quota: 940 Turnout: 1,898 (15.58%)
