= 2007 Aberdeen City Council election =

2007 Scottish local government election

- 3 May 2007

All 43 seats to Aberdeen City Council 22 seats needed for a majority
	First party	Second party	Third party
Party	Liberal Democrats	SNP	Labour
Last election	20 seats, 35.4%	6 seats, 23.0%	14 seats, 24.2%
Seats won	15	12	10
Seat change	▼5	▲6	▼3
Popular vote	20,845	22,791	19,003
Percentage	26.9%	29.5%	24.6%
Swing	▼8.5%	▲6.5%	▲0.4%
	Fourth party	Fifth party
Party	Conservative	Independent
Last election	3 seats, 15.3%	0 seats, 0.5%
Seats won	5	1
Seat change	▲2	0
Popular vote	10,889	2,090
Percentage	14.1%	2.7%
Swing	▼1.2%	▲2.2%
- The 13 multi-member wards
Council Leader before election
No overall control
Council Leader after election
No overall control

The 2007 Aberdeen City Council election took place on 3 May 2007 to elect members of Aberdeen City Council, at the same time as the Scottish Parliament general election. The election was the first one using 13 new wards created as a result of the Local Governance (Scotland) Act 2004, with each ward electing three or four councillors using the single transferable vote system form of proportional representation. The new wards replaced 43 single-member wards, which used the plurality (first past the post) system of election.

The results saw the council remain under no overall control.

== Election results ==
Aberdeen City local election result 2007
Party	Seats	Gains	Losses	Net gain/loss	Seats %	Votes %	Votes	+/−
Liberal Democrats	15	N/A	N/A	▼5	34.9	26.9	20,845	▼8.5
SNP	12	N/A	N/A	▲6	27.9	29.5	22,791	▲6.5
Labour	10	N/A	N/A	▼3	23.3	24.6	19,003	▲0.4
Conservative	5	N/A	N/A	▲2	11.6	14.1	10,889	▼1.2
Independent	1	N/A	N/A	0	2.3	2.7	2,090	▲2.2
Green	0	N/A	N/A	0	0.0	1.6	1,204	New
Solidarity	0	N/A	N/A	0	0.0	0.3	248	New
Scottish Socialist	0	N/A	N/A	0	0.0	0.3	218	▼1.4
BNP	0	N/A	N/A	0	0.0	0.1	81	New

== Ward results ==
Airyhall/Broomhill/Garthdee - 3 seats
Party	Candidate	FPv%	Count			
Party	Candidate	FPv%	1	2	3	4
Conservative	Jill Wisely	27.4	1,911			
Liberal Democrats	Scott Cassie	19.6	1,365	1,381	1,446	1,695
Liberal Democrats	Ian Yuill	18.0	1,257	1,310	1,385	1,565
SNP	Rigg Robertson	17.3	1,207	1,220	1,296	1,399
Labour	Allan McIntosh	12.8	894	901	940	
Independent	Graham Bennett	4.8	332	352		
Electorate: Valid: 6,966 Spoilt: 80 Quota: 1,742 Turnout: 7,046

Bridge of Don - 4 seats
Party	Candidate	FPv%	Count					
Party	Candidate	FPv%	1	2	3	4	5	6
SNP	Muriel Jaffrey	36.3	2,805					
Labour	Willie Young	20.9	1,615	1,615				
Liberal Democrats	John Reynolds†	18.3	1,411	1,573	1,573			
Liberal Democrats	Gordon Leslie†††††	9.5	731	921	929	938	977	1,316
Conservative	Brian Davidson	7.9	610	726	731	733	783	827
Liberal Democrats	Millie McLeod	5.2	404	509	523	535	587	
Independent	Hamish Mackay	1.9	146	267	272	273		
Electorate: Valid: 7,722 Spoilt: 92 Quota: 1,545 Turnout: 7,814

Dyce/Buckburn/Danestone - 4 seats
Party	Candidate	FPv%	Count						
Party	Candidate	FPv%	1	2	3	4	5	6	7
SNP	Mark McDonald	36.2	2,620						
Labour	Barney Crockett	24.9	1,801	1,801					
Liberal Democrats	Ron Clark	21.2	1,534	1,534	1,534				
Liberal Democrats	George Penny	5.0	360	593	667	713	727	769	885
Conservative	Avril MacKenzie	8.3	603	701	730	738	752	781	833
Green	Rhonda Reekie	2.0	147	298	330	335	348	409	
Independent	Angela Dunn	1.6	116	190	211	214	260		
Independent	Dennis Grattan	0.8	57	117	131	133			
Electorate: Valid: 7,238 Spoilt: 111 Quota: 1,448 Turnout: 7,349

George Street/Harbour - 3 seats
Party	Candidate	FPv%	Count				
Party	Candidate	FPv%	1	2	3	4	5
SNP	Andrew May	32.4	1,272				
Labour	Jim Hunter††††††	24.5	960	994			
Liberal Democrats	John Stewart	20.4	801	859	860	963	1,071
Green	Clive Kempe	7.8	306	364	365	414	492
Labour	George Penny	8.2	322	343	351	382	
Conservative	Alexander Olsen	6.7	261	282	282		
Electorate: Valid: 3,922 Spoilt: 91 Quota: 981 Turnout: 4,013

Hazlehead/Ashley/Queens Cross - 4 seats
Party	Candidate	FPv%	Count						
Party	Candidate	FPv%	1	2	3	4	5	6	7
Liberal Democrats	Martin Greig	24.0	1,901						
Conservative	Jim Farquharson†††	21.8	1,728	1,728					
Liberal Democrats	Jennifer Stewart	20.4	1,614	1,614	1,614				
SNP	John West	14.2	1,126	1,168	1,172	1,175	1,195	1,273	1,352
Labour	Timothy Harris	10.8	855	904	906	910	917	972	1,041
Conservative	Fraser Forsyth	5.1	406	457	573	578	583	614	
Green	Rachel Shanks	2.8	220	264	266	270	285		
Scottish Socialist	Howard Chandler	0.8	65	69	69	70			
Electorate: Valid: 7,915 Spoilt: 83 Quota: 1,584 Turnout: 7,998

Hilton/Stockethill - 3 seats
Party	Candidate	FPv%	Count			
Party	Candidate	FPv%	1	2	3	4
SNP	Kirsty West	33.9	1,761			
Labour	George Adam	30.6	1,589	1,589		
Liberal Democrats	Neil Fletcher	20.6	1,068	1,195	1,219	1,388
Labour	Charlie Pirie	8.6	444	532	745	792
Conservative	Frank Webster	6.3	329	371	375	
Electorate: Valid: 5,191 Spoilt: 130 Quota: 1,298 Turnout: 5,321

Kincorth/Loirston - 3 seats
Party	Candidate	FPv%	Count						
Party	Candidate	FPv%	1	2	3	4	5	6	7
SNP	Callum McCaig	32.0	1,883						
Liberal Democrats	Katharine Dean	20.2	1,190	1,262	1,270	1,309	1,462	1,610	
Labour	Neil Cooney	19.8	1,162	1,205	1,214	1,237	1,260	1,298	1,321
Labour	Sue Rae	12.7	748	782	792	826	843	889	992
Conservative	Graeme Webster	7.2	423	441	447	473	493		
Liberal Democrats	Angus Easton	4.1	239	260	266	283			
Independent	Daniel Yeats	3.0	179	206	224				
Solidarity	Paul Mitcheson	1.0	58	84					
Electorate: Valid: 5,882 Spoilt: 132 Quota: 1,471 Turnout: 6,024

Kingswells/Sheddocksley - 3 seats
Party	Candidate	FPv%	Count					
Party	Candidate	FPv%	1	2	3	4	5	6
SNP	Wendy Stuart	33.6	1,746					
Liberal Democrats	Peter Stephen	24.3	1,260	1,312				
Labour	Len Ironside	16.3	848	899	900	910	935	987
Labour	Rose Clayton	14.6	758	810	811	826	872	958
Conservative	Bill Berry	7.0	364	388	389	407	454	
Liberal Democrats	David Young	2.6	135	180	187	210		
BNP	Steven Thomson	1.6	81	111	112			
Electorate: Valid: 5,192 Spoilt: 98 Quota: 1,299 Turnout: 5,290

Lower Deeside - 3 seats
Party	Candidate	FPv%	Count				
Party	Candidate	FPv%	1	2	3	4	5
Liberal Democrats	Aileen Malone	23.9	1,536	1,660			
Conservative	Alan Milne††††	24.0	1,546	1,588	1,592	1,745	
Independent	Marie Boulton	17.1	1,097	1,173	1,176	1,353	1,399
SNP	David Adams	16.6	1,068	1,125	1,127	1,234	1,253
Liberal Democrats	Brian Malone	9.4	603	692	726		
Labour	Marianne Stewart	9.1	583				
Electorate: Valid: 6,435 Spoilt: 69 Quota: 1,609 Turnout: 6,504

Midstocket/Rosemount - 3 seats
Party	Candidate	FPv%	Count				
Party	Candidate	FPv%	1	2	3	4	5
Conservative	John Porter	27.7	1,503				
SNP	Bill Cormie	26.3	1,431	1,431			
Labour	Jenny Laing	21.1	1,144	1,164	1,176	1,223	1,281
Liberal Democrats	Steve Delaney	12.4	671	689	702	753	1,201
Liberal Democrats	Jim Donaldson	9.7	529	563	570	586	
Scottish Socialist	Christine Chandler	2.8	153	155	167		
Electorate: Valid: 5,431 Spoilt: 60 Quota: 1,358 Turnout: 5,491

Northfield - 3 seats
Party	Candidate	FPv%	Count			
Party	Candidate	FPv%	1	2	3	4
SNP	Jackie Dunbar	30.9	1,557			
Labour	Gordon Graham	27.8	1,401	1,401		
SNP	Kevin Stewart	20.8	1,050	1,249	1,258	1,281
Labour	Ramsey Milne	11.6	587	603	698	722
Liberal Democrats	Karen Freel	6.0	302	320	326	368
Conservative	Pat Wokoma	2.8	143	145	146	
Electorate: Valid: 5,040 Spoilt: 203 Quota: 1,261 Turnout: 5,243

Tillydrone/Seaton/Old Aberdeen - 3 seats
Party	Candidate	FPv%	Count					
Party	Candidate	FPv%	1	2	3	4	5	6
SNP	Jim Noble	31.9	1,365					
Labour	Norman Collie††	25.1	1,074	1,074				
Liberal Democrats	Richard Robertson	13.7	585	638	638	659	799	926
Labour	Sandra Macdonald	13.9	595	634	635	648	718	791
Conservative	Hannah Dolan	7.8	333	347	347	354	377	
Green	Daniel Johnston	5.7	244	289	289	329		
Solidarity	Angela McLeman	2.1	88	110	110			
Electorate: Valid: 4,284 Spoilt: 109 Quota: 1,072 Turnout: 4,393

Torry/Ferryhill - 4 seats
Party	Candidate	FPv%	Count							
Party	Candidate	FPv%	1	2	3	4	5	6	7	8
SNP	Jim Kiddie	30.9	1,900							
Labour	Yvonne Allan	20.7	1,275	1,275						
Liberal Democrats	Irene Cormack	17.5	1,077	1,155	1,160	1,169	1,202	1,397		
Conservative	Alan Donnelly	11.9	729	757	758	762	796	818	846	889
Green	John Reekie	4.7	287	386	388	431	476	528	564	672
Labour	Ted Harris	5.7	348	415	440	458	478	511	538	
Liberal Democrats	Tony Petchey	4.4	270	334	335	345	364			
Independent	Chris Cowie	2.6	163	198	199	219				
Solidarity	Shug Falconer	1.7	102	150	151					
Electorate: Valid: 6,151 Spoilt: 112 Quota: 1,231 Turnout: 6,263

== Changes since 2007 Election ==
- † In March 2012, Bridge of Don Cllr John Reynolds resigned from the Liberal Democrats and sat as an Independent.
- †† In January 2011, Tillydrone/Seaton/Old Aberdeen Cllr Norman Collie resigned from the Labour Party and set as an Independent.
- ††† In June 2011, Hazlehead/Ashley/Queens Cross Cllr Jim Farquaharson was expelled from the Conservative Party and sat as an Independent.
- †††† In June 2011, Lower Deeside Cllr Alan Milne was expelled from the Conservative Party and sat as an Independent.
- ††††† In September 2011, Bridge of Don Cllr Gordon Leslie was suspended from the Liberal Democrats. He subsequently resigned from the party and sat as an Independent.
- †††††† In February 2012, George Street/Harbour Cllr Jim Hunter was suspended from the Labour Party. He subsequently resigned from the party and sat as an Independent.

== By-Elections since 3 May 2007 ==
- A by-election was held in the Midstocket/Rosemount Ward following the death of the Conservatives' John Porter on 23 May 2007. The by-election was won by the SNP's John Corall on 16 August 2007

Midstocket/Rosemount by-election 16 August 2007 - 1 Seat
Party	Candidate	FPv%	Count				
Party	Candidate	FPv%	1	2	3	4	5
SNP	John Corall	29.5	873	875	885	984	1,258
Conservative	Fraser Forsyth	27.8	821	825	826	873	1,122
Liberal Democrats	Steve Delaney	23.4	693	700	708	869	
Labour	Allan McIntosh	17.5	518	520	529		
Solidarity	Stephen Haddan	1.1	31	33			
Independent	Dennis Grattan	0.7	20				
SNP gain from Conservative		Swing					
Electorate: 10,288 Valid: 2,956 Spoilt: 21 Quota: 1,479 Turnout: 2,977 (28.9%)

- A by-election was held in the Dyce/Bucksburn/Danestone Ward following the death of the Liberal Democrats' Ron Clark on 21 February 2011. The by-election was won by the SNP's Neil MacGregor on 19 May 2011

Dyce/Bucksburn/Danestone by-election 19 May 2011 - 1 Seat
Party	Candidate	FPv%	Count
Party	Candidate	FPv%	1
SNP	Neil MacGregor	51.4	2,090
Labour	Graeme Lawrence	23.1	941
Liberal Democrats	Kristian Chapman	11.0	446
Conservative	Ross Thomson	8.7	352
Independent	Angela Joss	3.7	150
Green	Rhonda Reekie	2.2	88
SNP gain from Liberal Democrats		Swing	
Electorate: Valid: 4,067 Spoilt: Quota: 2,034 Turnout: 29.5%

- A by-election was held in the Airyhall/Broomhill/Garthdee Ward following the resignation of the Liberal Democrats' Scott Cassie on 27 April 2011 after he was jailed for embezzlement. The by-election was won by the SNP's Gordon Scott Townson on 23 June 2011.

Airyhall/Broomhill/Garthdee by-election 23 June 2011 - 1 Seat
Party	Candidate	FPv%	Count							
Party	Candidate	FPv%	1	2	3	4	5	6	7	8
SNP	Gordon Scott Townson	33.2	1,112	1,115	1,120	1,136	1,161	1,263	1,441	1,792
Labour	Angela Taylor	23.3	783	783	784	810	829	956	1,068	
Conservative	Bill Berry	19.4	649	652	654	656	676	801		
Liberal Democrats	Gregor McAbery	16.5	554	558	562	584	599			
Independent	Graham Murray Bennett	2.9	98	99	109	122				
Green	Richie Brian	3.0	101	103	104					
Independent	Hamish Hay Mackay	1.0	32	34						
National Front	Dave Macdonald	0.7	25							
SNP gain from Liberal Democrats		Swing	18.5%							
Electorate: 11,623 Valid: 3,354 Spoilt: 32 Quota: 1,678 Turnout: 3,386 (29.1%)
