= 1917 Aberdeen South by-election =

British parliamentary by-election

The 1917 Aberdeen South by-election was a parliamentary by-election for the British House of Commons constituency of Aberdeen South comprising the local government wards in the southern part of the city of Aberdeen. The by-election took place on 3 April 1917.

== Vacancy ==
The by-election was caused by the resignation of the sitting Liberal MP, George Esslemont for reasons of ill-health. Esslemont had been MP for Aberdeen South since retaining the seat for the Liberals in a by-election in February 1907 following the appointment of James Bryce to be British Ambassador to the United States. Although he was aged only 57 years, Esslemont died on 2 October 1917, just a few months after stepping down from Parliament.

== Candidates ==
=== Liberals ===
On 1 March 1917, it was reported that the Liberals intended to put forward the name of Sir James Murray, the former MP for East Aberdeenshire. In fact the local Liberals were in dispute over their candidate, reflecting the growing division in the party between those supporting the coalition government of David Lloyd George and those favouring the opposition Liberals led by H H Asquith. Murray was said to be a strong supporter of Lloyd George's government. The Asquithians gave their backing to Vivian Phillipps, Asquith's private secretary. A third name was also under consideration, that of Sir John Fleming, an ex-Lord Provost of Aberdeen. Fleming may well have been seen as a good compromise candidate, as, following the intervention of the prime minister himself, Murray was persuaded to withdraw from the contest and Fleming was formally selected.

=== Conservatives ===
As partners in the wartime coalition government, the Conservatives abided by the electoral truce between the main parties and did not put forward a candidate.

=== Others ===
Two other candidates came forward to contest Aberdeen South. James Watson, Professor of Chemistry at Anderson's College, Glasgow declared he wished to stand as an independent citizen's candidate, a vigorous supporter of what he called patriotic democracy. Watson had contested the Bridgeton Division of Glasgow at the 1895 general election standing for the Independent Labour Party.

The other candidate was Frederick Pethick-Lawrence. He sought election as a 'Peace by Negotiation' candidate and was sponsored by the Union of Democratic Control of which he was the treasurer.

== The election ==
The writ for the by-election was issued in Parliament on 26 March 1917. Nomination day was 30 March, with polling to take place on 3 April. Despite the atmosphere of wartime campaigning and the absence of a Tory candidate, some Liberals were fearful of the result. It was reported that there had been a backlash amongst some of Sir James Murray's supporters, who had not accepted his withdrawal and who refused to vote for Fleming; that Watson had the potential to get a large vote from Labour supporters, from Unionists, who had no candidate of their own, and disaffected Liberals.

== Result ==
The result however was a comfortable win for Fleming, with a majority of 1,776 votes over Watson or 34.7% of the poll. This was consistent with other election results in Scotland during the war with public opinion overwhelmingly pro-government. Fleming took his seat in Parliament on 24 April 1917 but only represented his constituency until the 1918 general election. Standing as an Independent (Asquithian) Liberal he lost to Frederick Thomson, a Conservative barrister who seems to have been awarded the Coalition Coupon.

Fleming

Aberdeen South by-election, 1917
Party	Candidate	Votes	%	±%
Liberal	John Fleming	3,283	64.1	+4.6
Independent	James Watson	1,507	29.4	New
Independent	Frederick Pethick-Lawrence	333	6.5	New
Majority		1,776	34.7	+15.7
Turnout		5,123	37.1	−35.1
Liberal hold		Swing		

== See also ==
- List of United Kingdom by-elections
- United Kingdom by-election records
