= Work and Pensions Select Committee =

UK House of Commons select committee

The Work and Pensions Select Committee is a select committee of the House of Commons in the Parliament of the United Kingdom. The remit of the committee is to examine the expenditure, administration, and policy of the Department for Work and Pensions and its associated public bodies.

== Chairs ==
Committee chairs include those listed below.

Name	Start	End	Party	Constituency
Frank Field	18 November 1993	21 March 1997	Labour	Birkenhead
Archy Kirkwood	14 July 1997	11 April 2005	Liberal Democrats	Roxburgh and Berwickshire
Terry Rooney	18 July 2005	6 May 2010	Labour	Bradford North
Anne Begg	10 June 2010	30 March 2015	Labour	Aberdeen South
Frank Field	18 June 2015	6 November 2019	Labour (2015–2018)	Birkenhead
Frank Field	18 June 2015	6 November 2019	Independent (2018–2019)	Birkenhead
Stephen Timms	29 January 2020	30 May 2024	Labour	East Ham
Debbie Abrahams	11 September 2024	present	Labour	Oldham East and Saddleworth

== Membership ==
Membership of the committee is as follows:

Member	Party	Constituency
Debbie Abrahams MP (chair)	Labour	Oldham East and Saddleworth
Rushanara Ali MP	Labour	Bethnal Green and Stepney
Peter Bedford MP	Conservative	Mid Leicestershire
Steve Darling MP	Liberal Democrats	Torbay
Neil Duncan-Jordan MP	Labour	Poole
Damien Egan MP	Labour	Bristol North East
Patrick Hurley MP	Labour	Southport
John Milne MP	Liberal Democrats	Horsham
Joy Morrissey MP	Conservative	Beaconsfield
Andrew Pakes MP	Labour	Peterborough
Liz Twist MP	Labour	Blaydon and Consett

=== Changes since 2024 ===
Date	Outgoing Member & Party	Constituency	→	New Member & Party	Constituency	Source
16 December 2024	Neil Coyle MP (Labour)	Bermondsey and Old Southwark	→	Frank McNally MP (Labour)	Coatbridge and Bellshill	Hansard
17 March 2025	Ben Obese-Jecty MP (Conservative)	Huntingdon	→	Danny Kruger MP (Conservative)	East Wiltshire	Hansard
21 October 2025	Danny Kruger MP (Reform UK)	East Wiltshire	→	Joy Morrissey MP (Conservative)	Beaconsfield	Hansard
27 October 2025	David Pinto-Duschinsky MP (Labour)	Hendon	→	Lee Barron MP (Labour)	Corby and East Northamptonshire	Hansard
27 October 2025	Gill German MP (Labour)	Clwyd North	→	David Baines MP (Labour)	St Helens North	Hansard
27 October 2025	Frank McNally MP (Labour)	Coatbridge and Bellshill	→	Rushanara Ali MP (Labour)	Bethnal Green and Stepney	Hansard
22 June 2026	Johanna Baxter MP (Labour)	Paisley and Renfrewshire South	→	Patrick Hurley MP (Labour)	Southport	Hansard
22 June 2026	Amanda Hack MP (Labour)	North West Leicestershire	→	Liz Twist MP (Labour)	Blaydon and Consett	Hansard
26 October 2026	David Baines MP (Labour)	St Helens North	→	Andrew Pakes MP (Labour)	Peterborough	Hansard
11 November 2026	Lee Barron MP (Labour)	Corby and East Northamptonshire	→	Neil Duncan-Jordan MP (Labour)	Poole	Hansard

== 2019-2024 Parliament ==
The chair was elected on 29 January 2020, with the members of the committee being announced on 2 March 2020.

Member	Party	Constituency
Stephen Timms MP (chair)	Labour	East Ham
Debbie Abrahams MP	Labour	Oldham East and Saddleworth
Shaun Bailey MP	Conservative	West Bromwich West
Siobhan Baillie MP	Conservative	Stroud
Neil Coyle MP	Labour (Note: Whip suspended from 11 February 2022 to 25 May 2023.)	Bermondsey and Old Southwark
Steve McCabe MP	Labour	Birmingham Selly Oak
Nigel Mills MP	Conservative	Amber Valley
Selaine Saxby MP	Conservative	North Devon
Dr Ben Spencer MP	Conservative	Runnymede and Weybridge
Chris Stephens MP	Scottish National Party	Glasgow South West
Desmond Swayne	Conservative	New Forest West

=== Changes 2019-2024 ===
Date	Outgoing Member & Party	Constituency	→	New Member & Party	Constituency	Source
9 January 2023	Chris Stephens MP (SNP)	Glasgow South West	→	David Linden MP (SNP)	Glasgow East	Hansard
18 December 2023	Steve McCabe MP (Labour)	Birmingham Selly Oak	→	Marsha de Cordova MP (Labour)	Battersea	Hansard

== 2017-2019 Parliament ==
The chair was elected on 12 July 2017, with the members of the committee being announced on 11 September 2017.

Member	Party	Constituency
Frank Field MP (chair)	Labour	Birkenhead
Heidi Allen MP	Conservative	South Cambridgeshire
Alex Burghart MP	Conservative	Brentwood and Ongar
Marsha de Cordova MP	Labour	Battersea
Neil Coyle MP	Labour	Bermondsey and Old Southwark
Ruth George MP	Labour	High Peak
Steve McCabe MP	Labour	Birmingham Selly Oak
Chris Stephens MP	Scottish National Party	Glasgow South West

=== Changes 2017–2019 ===
Date	Outgoing Member & Party	Constituency	→	New Member & Party	Constituency	Source
16 October 2017	New seat		→	Andrew Bowie MP (Conservative)	West Aberdeenshire and Kincardine	Hansard
16 October 2017	New seat		→	Jack Brereton MP (Conservative)	Stoke-on-Trent South	Hansard
16 October 2017	New seat		→	Chris Green MP (Conservative)	Bolton West	Hansard
23 October 2017	Marsha de Cordova MP (Labour)	Battersea	→	Emma Dent Coad MP (Labour)	Kensington	Hansard
20 February 2018	Chris Green MP (Conservative)	Bolton West	→	Nigel Mills MP (Conservative)	Amber Valley	Hansard
4 June 2018	Andrew Bowie MP (Conservative)	Aberdeenshire West and Kincardine	→	Justin Tomlinson MP (Conservative)	North Swindon	Hansard
4 June 2018	Emma Dent Coad MP (Labour)	Kensington	→	Rosie Duffield MP (Labour)	Canterbury	Hansard
26 November 2018	Justin Tomlinson MP (Conservative)	North Swindon	→	Derek Thomas MP	St Ives	Hansard
11 February 2019	Alex Burghart MP (Conservative)	Brentwood and Ongar	→	Anna Soubry MP (Conservative)	Broxtowe	Hansard

== 2015-2017 Parliament ==
The chair was elected on 18 June 2015, with members being announced on 8 July 2015.

Member	Party	Constituency
Frank Field MP (chair)	Labour	Birkenhead
Debbie Abrahams MP	Labour	Oldham East and Saddleworth
Heidi Allen MP	Conservative	South Cambridgeshire
Mhairi Black MP	Scottish National Party	Paisley and Renfrewshire South
Karen Buck MP	Labour	Westminster North
John Glen MP	Conservative	North East Hertfordshire
Richard Graham MP	Conservative	Salisbury
Emma Lewell-Buck MP	Labour	South Shields
Craig Mackinlay MP	Conservative	South Thanet
Jeremy Quin MP	Conservative	Horsham
Craig Williams (British politician) MP	Conservative	Cardiff North

=== Changes 2015-2017 ===
Date	Outgoing Member & Party	Constituency	→	New Member & Party	Constituency	Source
26 October 2015	Debbie Abrahams MP (Labour)	Oldham East and Saddleworth	→	Steve McCabe MP (Labour)	Birmingham Selly Oak	Hansard
1 February 2016	Emma Lewell-Buck MP (Labour)	South Shields	→	Neil Coyle MP (Labour)	Bermondsey and Old Southwark	Hansard
31 October 2016	Jeremy Quin MP (Conservative)	Horsham	→	James Cartlidge MP (Conservative)	South Suffolk	Hansard
31 October 2016	Craig Williams MP (Conservative)	Cardiff North	→	Luke Hall MP (Conservative)	Thornbury and Yate	Hansard
19 December 2016	John Glen MP (Conservative)	Salisbury	→	Royston Smith MP (Conservative)	Southampton Itchen	Hansard

== 2010-2015 Parliament ==
The chair was elected on 10 June 2010, with members being announced on 12 July 2010.

Member	Party	Constituency
Anne Begg MP (chair)	Labour	Aberdeen South
Harriett Baldwin MP	Conservative	West Worcestershire
Karen Bradley MP	Conservative	Staffordshire Moorlands
Karen Buck MP	Labour	Westminster North
Margaret Curran MP	Labour	Glasgow East
Richard Graham MP	Conservative	Gloucester
Kate Green MP	Labour	Stretford and Urmston
Oliver Heald MP	Conservative	North East Hertfordshire
Sajid Javid MP	Conservative	Bromsgrove
Stephen Lloyd MP	Liberal Democrats	Eastbourne
Shabana Mahmood MP	Labour	Birmingham Ladywood

=== Changes 2010-2015 ===
Date	Outgoing Member & Party	Constituency	→	New Member & Party	Constituency	Source
2 November 2010	Karen Buck MP (Labour)	Westminster North	→	Alex Cunningham MP (Labour)	Stockton North	Hansard
2 November 2010	Margaret Curran MP (Labour)	Glasgow East	→	Glenda Jackson MP (Labour)	Hampstead and Kilburn	Hansard
2 November 2010	Shabana Mahmood MP (Labour)	Birmingham Ladywood	→	Teresa Pearce MP (Labour)	Erith and Thamesmead	Hansard
29 November 2010	Richard Graham MP (Conservative)	Gloucester	→	Andrew Bingham MP (Conservative)	High Peak	Hansard
29 November 2010	Sajid Javid MP (Conservative)	Bromsgrove	→	Brandon Lewis MP (Conservative)	Great Yarmouth	Hansard
27 June 2011	Alex Cunningham MP (Labour)	Stockton North	→	Debbie Abrahams MP (Labour)	Oldham East and Saddleworth	Hansard
25 October 2011	Kate Green MP (Labour)	Stretford and Urmston	→	Sheila Gilmore MP (Labour)	Edinburgh East	Hansard
29 October 2012	Harriett Baldwin MP (Conservative)	West Worcestershire	→	Aidan Burley MP (Conservative)	Cannock Chase	Hansard
29 October 2012	Andrew Bingham MP (Conservative)	High Peak	→	Jane Ellison MP (Conservative)	Battersea	Hansard
29 October 2012	Karen Bradley MP (Conservative)	Staffordshire Moorlands	→	Graham Evans MP (Conservative)	Weaver Vale	Hansard
29 October 2012	Oliver Heald MP (Conservative)	North East Hertfordshire	→	Nigel Mills MP (Conservative)	Amber Valley	Hansard
29 October 2012	Brandon Lewis MP (Conservative)	Great Yarmouth	→	Anne Marie Morris MP (Conservative)	Newton Abbot	Hansard
10 June 2013	Aidan Burley MP (Conservative)	Cannock Chase	→	Mike Freer MP (Conservative)	Finchley and Golders Green	Hansard
4 November 2013	Jane Ellison MP (Conservative)	Battersea	→	Kwasi Kwarteng MP (Conservative)	Spelthorne	Hansard
4 November 2013	Mike Freer MP (Conservative)	Finchley and Golders Green	→	Dame Angela Watkinson MP (Conservative)	Hornchurch and Upminster	Hansard
27 January 2014	Stephen Lloyd MP (Liberal Democrats)	Eastbourne	→	Mike Thornton MP (Liberal Democrats)	Eastleigh	Hansard
8 September 2014	Dame Angela Watkinson MP (Conservative)	Hornchurch and Upminster	→	Paul Maynard MP (Conservative)	Blackpool North and Cleveleys	Hansard

== Significant inquiries ==
The committee has been involved in a number of significant investigations.

=== Welfare safety net inquiry (2015) ===
On 18 September 2015, the committee announced that it was beginning an enquiry into the 'welfare safety net'. The committee's chair, in launching the enquiry, said:

"There is a great deal of concern that some of the least advantaged people are slipping through our safety net into a state of hunger. Our welfare safety net has developed over decades because there is a level below which we as a society do not believe anyone should fall, no matter where they live. We want to understand how local councils are adapting and coping with the changes in benefits and the extra responsibilities on them to meet genuine need and maintain that basic safety net."

=== Two child limit (2019) ===
In 2019 the Work and Pensions Select Committee recommended ending the two-child limit on welfare payments. The committee heard evidence from charities, economists and faith groups and stated the limit had, “unintended consequences that no government should be willing to accept”. The committee stated the justification for the limit assumed all pregnancies were planned, that distinguishing between families on benefits and families in work was “crude and unrealistic”, further evidence did not support the case that the two child limit might encourage parents to increase their incomes from work. The committee argued for no significant distinction between households on benefits and those working. In April 2019, 72% of families getting tax credits were in work. In May 2019, 28% of working-age housing benefit claimants were, “in employment and not on passported benefit”. in October 2019, 33% of Universal Credit claimants were recorded as employed. Frank Field MP said, “Any family in this country, except the super-rich, could fall foul of the two-child limit if their circumstances changed for the worse. This is exactly why social security must act as a national insurance scheme covering people when they’re most exposed to hardship – not increase it.”

== See also ==
- Parliamentary committees of the United Kingdom
- Department for Work and Pensions
