= Mary Esslemont =

Scottish general practitioner

Mary Esslemont CBE MA BSC MB ChB FRCGP LLD DPH
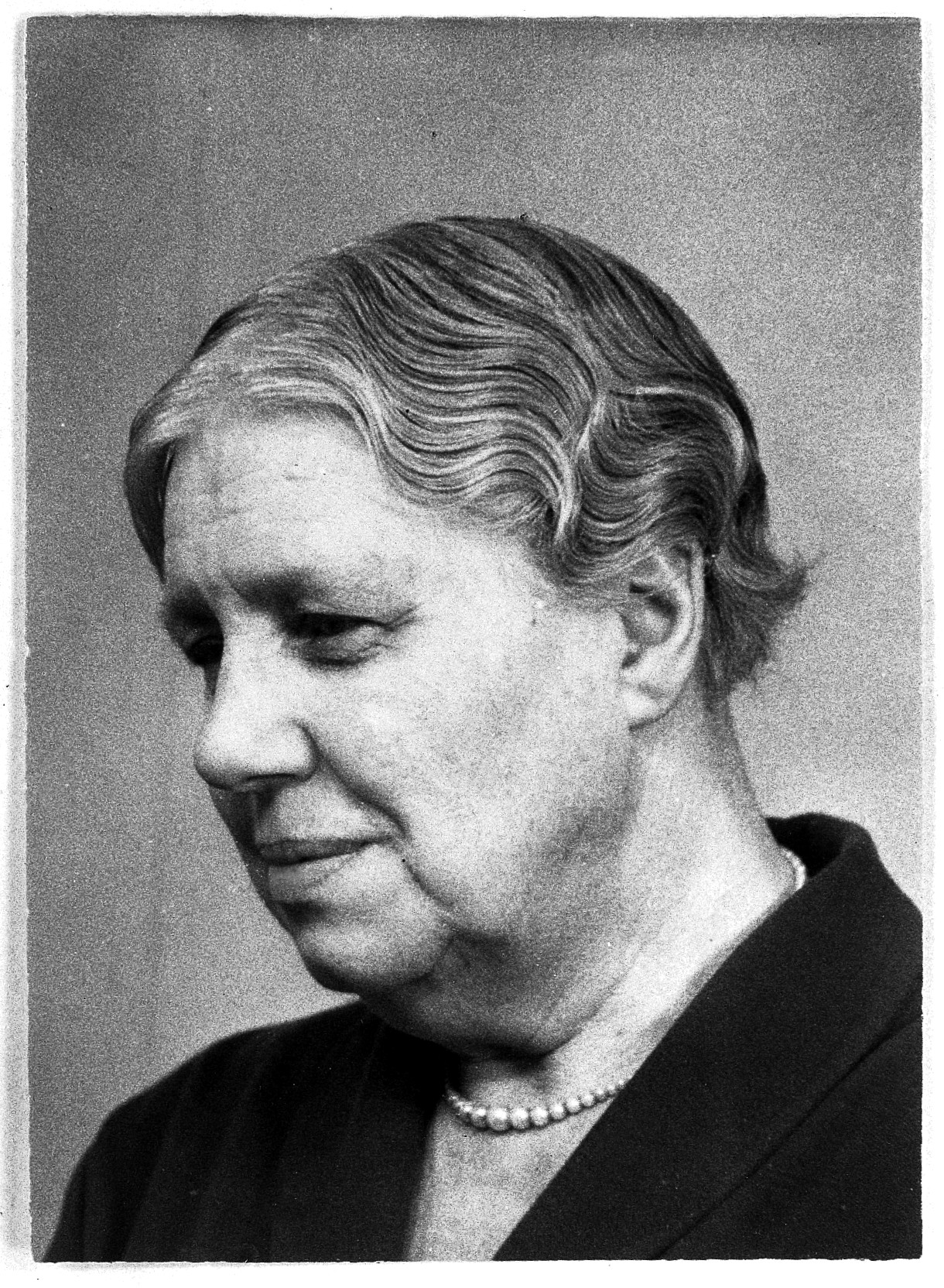
- Mary Esslemont
- Born: 3 July 1891; Aberdeen, Scotland
- Died: 25 August 1984 (aged 93); Aberdeen, Scotland
- Education: University of Aberdeen (1914, 1915, 1923)
- Occupation: General practitioner
- Medical career
- Field: general practice

Mary Esslemont CBE MA BSC MB ChB FRCGP LLD DPH (3 July 1891 - 25 August 1984) was a general practitioner in Aberdeen, Scotland, Vice President of the British Medical Association (BMA) and president of the Soroptimist Federation.

== Early life and education ==
Mary Esslemont was born in Aberdeen in 1891. Her mother, Clementine Macdonald, was President of the Aberdeen Women's Liberal Association, and her father George Esslemont, was the Liberal MP for South Aberdeen. She was educated at Aberdeen High School for Girls and the University of Aberdeen, graduating with a BSc (1914) and an MA (1915). After completing her degrees, she lectured in science at Stockwell Training College, London (1917-1919) before returned to Aberdeen to complete her medical degree, MBChB (1923). At university, she was the first woman President of the Students' Representative Association.

== Career ==
After university, she became an assistant medical officer in Keighley, Yorkshire (1924-1929). When she returned to Aberdeen in 1929 she became a general practitioner, practising for 30 years, and was appointed gynaecologist at the city's Free Dispensary. She was noted for her work with the city's poor and underprivileged and for her activism for women's rights.

Esslemont was the only Scot and only woman to sit on the committee that negotiated on behalf of the BMA with Aneurin Bevan on the development of the National Health Service. In 1953-4 She was President of the Medical Women's Federation She was made a CBE in 1955, and a Fellow of the Royal College of General Practitioners in 1969. The following year the BMA made her a vice-president in recognition of her service.

Apart from her medical work, Esslemont was involved in University life. Esslemont served on the University of Aberdeen General Council, sitting on the University Court from 1947 to 1974. In 1954 she became the first woman President of the Aberdeen Liberal Association.

Esslemont remained active throughout her life. She was a keen Soroptimist and in 1961 she became President of the Federation of Soroptimist Clubs of Great Britain and Ireland. In that capacity she travelled to Africa to found the first Soroptimist Clubs on the continent.

== Awards and honours ==
Esslemont was awarded an honorary LLD in 1954, by the University of Aberdeen and a student residence, Esslemont House, was named after her in 1976. In 1981 she was awarded the Freedom of the City of Aberdeen.

There is a commemorative plaque at 30 Beechgrove Terrace, Aberdeen where Esslemont previously lived.

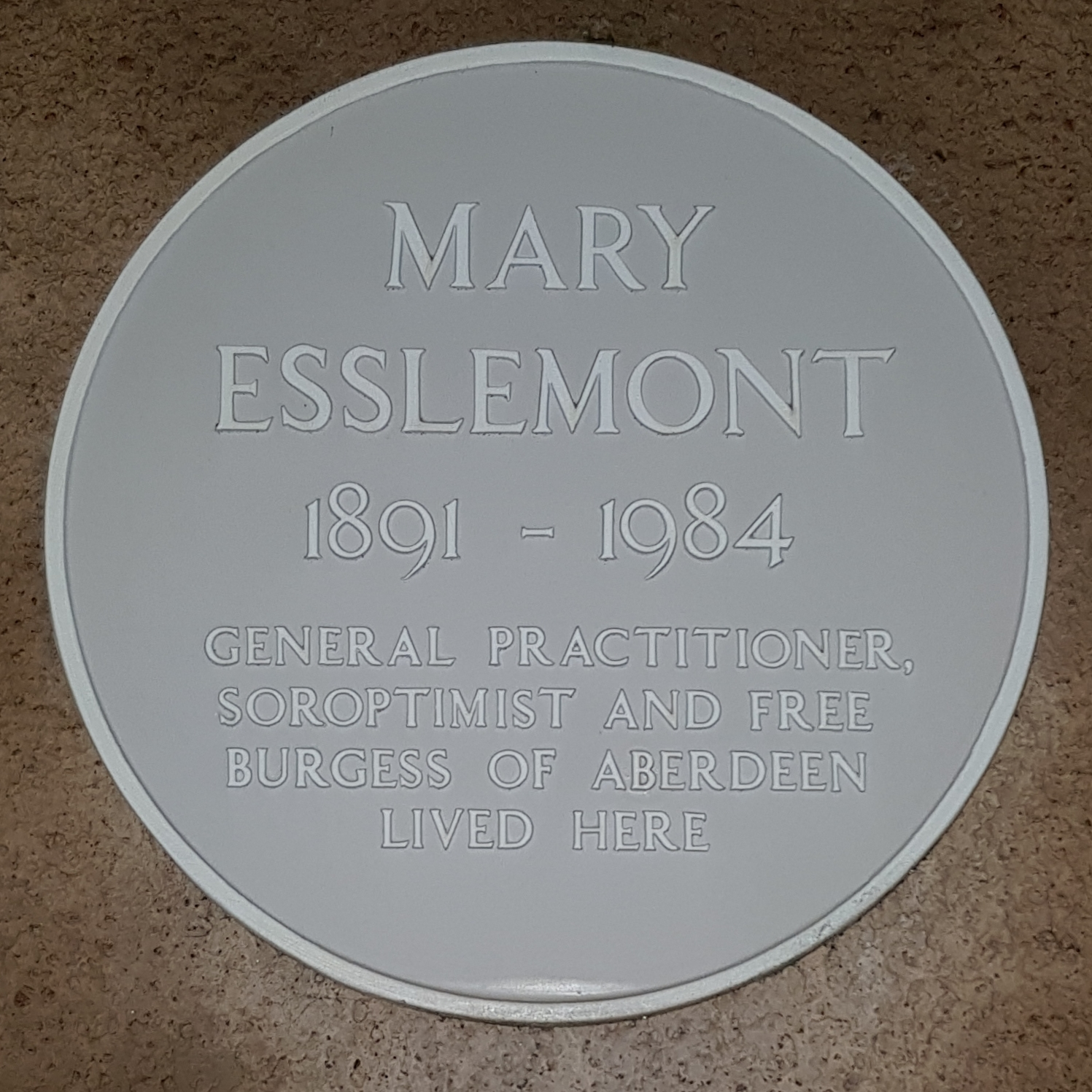
Plaque to commemorate Mary Esslemont on Beechgrove Terrace
