= Ian Yuill =

British politician (born 1964)

Councillor, Aberdeen City Council
- Incumbent
- Assumed office 6 April 1995

Councillor, Airyhall/Broomhill/Garthdee ward, Aberdeen City Council
- Incumbent
- Assumed office 2 May 2007
- Preceded by: Ward created

Councillor, Broomhill ward, Aberdeen City Council
- In office 6 May 1999 – 30 April 2007
- Preceded by: John Graham
- Succeeded by: Ward abolished

Councillor, Morningside ward, Aberdeen City Council
- In office 6 April 1995 – 5 May 1999
- Preceded by: Ward created
- Succeeded by: Ward abolished

Councillor, Auchinyell division, Grampian Regional Council
- In office 5 May 1994 – 31 March 1996
- Preceded by: Charles King
- Succeeded by: Ward abolished

Personal details
- Born: 12 February 1964 (age 62) Perth, Scotland
- Party: Scottish Liberal Democrats
- Children: 1
- Education: Robert Gordon's College; Robert Gordon's Institute of Technology
- Profession: Chartered Marketer

Ian Gillan Yuill (born 12 February 1964) is a Scottish politician who has served as councillor in Aberdeen, Scotland since 1994. A member of the Scottish Liberal Democrats, he has served as Co-Leader of Aberdeen City Council since 18 May 2022. Yuill was previously the Depute Leader of Aberdeen City Council from 2003 to 2007 and Chair of Nestrans from 2011 to 2012. Yuill was both Convener of the Scottish Liberal Democrats and Vice President of the UK Liberal Democrats between 1998 and 2002.

== Background and personal life ==
Born in Perth, Scotland, Yuill was brought up and educated in Aberdeen. He was educated at Robert Gordon's College in Aberdeen and at Robert Gordon Institute of Technology (now Robert Gordon University), Aberdeen, where he obtained a BA in Business Studies. He worked in Aberdeen as a retail manager, political campaign organiser, constituency manager for Nicol Stephen MP, community business manager and senior manager for a large Scottish charity. Yuill is a Chartered Marketer.

== Political career ==
Yuill was elected to represent the Auchinyell division of the former Grampian Regional Council on 5 May 1994 and subsequently to represent the Morningside ward of the then newly created Aberdeen City Council on 6 April 1995.

He has continued to represent the same general area of Aberdeen through a number of ward name and ward boundary changes and currently represents the Airyhall/Broomhill/Garthdee ward. He was most recently re-elected in May 2022.

On 18 May 2022, Yuill was appointed Co-Leader of Aberdeen City Council as part of a Partnership Agreement between the Liberal Democrats and the Scottish National Party (SNP) to form a coalition to lead the Council.

=== Other electoral activity ===
Yuill was the Liberal Democrat candidate in Dundee East at the 1992 general election, where he came fourth with 1,725 votes (4.05%).

Yuill stood for election to the Scottish Parliament in the 1999 election, being an unsuccessful candidate in the North East Scotland electoral region.

He later ran in the Aberdeen South constituency at the 2001 general election. Yuill took second place with 10,308 votes (27.9%), while the incumbent Labour MP, Anne Begg, was returned with an increased majority. He again stood for Aberdeen South in the 2019 general election, where he finished in third place with 11% of the vote. On that occasion, the constituency was won by SNP candidate Stephen Flynn, who took the seat from the Conservatives.

At the 2021 Scottish Parliament election, Yuill ran in the Aberdeen South and North Kincardine constituency and the North East Scotland electoral region. On the constituency vote, he received 2,889 votes (7.4%), taking fourth place. On the regional list, the Liberal Democrats' share of the vote dropped by 1% to 18,051 votes (5%), which saw the party lose their seat. Yuill had been placed fourth on the party list.
