= 1907 Aberdeen South by-election =

British parliamentary by-election

- 20 February 1907

Candidate	Esslemont	McNeill	Bramley
Party	Liberal	Conservative	Ind. Labour Party
Popular vote	3,779	3,412	1,740
Percentage	42.3%	38.2%	19.5%
MP before election
James Bryce
Liberal
Subsequent MP
George Esslemont
Liberal

The 1907 Aberdeen South by-election was held on 20 February 1907. The by-election was held due to the incumbent Liberal MP, James Bryce, being appointed British Ambassador to the United States. It was won by the Liberal candidate George Esslemont.

Fred Bramley, who stood for the "Aberdeen Labour Representation Committee", was not officially endorsed by the Labour Party or the Scottish Workers' Representation Committee.

== Campaign ==
Esslemont, the Liberal candidate, supported extending the right to vote to women. Despite this, the Women's Social and Political Union set up a local campaign office to campaign against him. This put the WSPU in conflict with local women's suffrage campaigners who supported Esslemont.

== Result ==
Aberdeen South by-election, 1907
Party	Candidate	Votes	%	±%
Liberal	George Esslemont	3,779	42.3	−32.1
Conservative	Ronald McNeill	3,412	38.2	+12.6
Ind. Labour Party	Fred Bramley	1,740	19.5	New
Majority		367	4.1	−44.7
Turnout		8,931	68.4	−1.8
Liberal hold		Swing	-22.4	
