= Aberdeen Central (UK Parliament constituency) =

UK Parliament constituency (1997–2005)

- Former burgh constituency for the House of Commons
- Boundary of Aberdeen Central in Scotland
- Subdivisions of Scotland: Aberdeenshire
- Major settlements: Aberdeen

1997–2005
- Seats: One
- Created from: Aberdeen North; Aberdeen South
- Replaced by: Aberdeen North; Aberdeen South

Aberdeen Central was a burgh constituency in the city of Aberdeen in Scotland which was represented in the House of Commons of the Parliament of the United Kingdom. It was created for the 1997 general election and returned one Member of Parliament (MP) by the first past the post system until it was abolished for the 2005 general election.

== History ==
Upon the boundary review in time for the 2005 election, the seat was abolished, with most of the seat joining Aberdeen North, except for Queen's Cross, Gilcomston and Langstane which joined Aberdeen South.

== Boundaries ==
The City of Aberdeen District electoral divisions of Cairncry, Causewayend, Linksfield, Rosemount, Rubislaw, St Machar, St Nicholas, and Woodside.

As its name suggested, Aberdeen Central centred on the centre of Aberdeen, the boundaries generally being, but not precisely, the River Dee and River Don and the Anderson Drive ring-road.

== Members of Parliament ==
Election	Member	Party
1997	Frank Doran	Labour
2005	Constituency abolished: see Aberdeen North and Aberdeen South	

== Elections ==
=== Elections in the 1990s ===
General election 1997: Aberdeen Central
Party	Candidate	Votes	%	±%
Labour	Frank Doran	17,745	49.8	+6.7
Conservative	Jill Wisely	6,944	19.5	−9.3
SNP	Brian Topping	5,767	16.2	−1.4
Liberal Democrats	John Brown	4,714	13.2	+2.6
Referendum	James Farquharson	446	1.3	
Majority		10,801	30.3	+16.0
Turnout		35,616	65.3	
Labour win (new seat)				

=== Elections in the 2000s ===
General election 2001: Aberdeen Central
Party	Candidate	Votes	%	±%
Labour	Frank Doran	12,025	45.5	−4.3
SNP	Wayne Gordon Gault	5,379	20.4	+4.2
Liberal Democrats	Mrs. Eleanor Anderson	4,547	17.2	+4.0
Conservative	Stewart Norman Gunn Whyte	3,761	14.2	−5.3
Scottish Socialist	Andy Cumbers	717	2.7	New
Majority		6,646	25.1	−5.2
Turnout		26,429	52.7	−12.6
Labour hold		Swing	−4.2	

General election 1992: Aberdeen Central (Notional)
Party	Candidate	Votes	%	±%
Labour			43.1	N/A
Conservative			28.8	N/A
SNP			17.6	N/A
Liberal Democrats			10.6	N/A
Majority			14.3	N/A
