= James Walker of Richmondhill =

Scottish businessman (1837–1921)

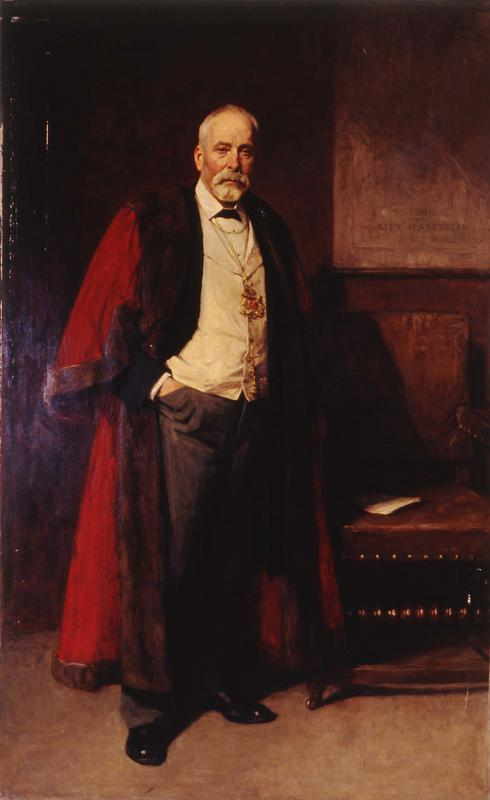
James Walker of Richmondhill, Lord Provost of Aberdeen (1902-1905) by Sir George Reid

James Walker of Richmondhill (28 August 1837 – 13 July 1921) was a Scottish businessman who served as Lord Provost of Aberdeen.

== Life ==
Walker was born at Tomachallich a hill farm in the parish of Aboyne on 28 August 1837.

He entered Aberdeen town Council in 1870. He was elected Lord Provost in 1902 and subsequently appointed Lord Lieutenant of Aberdeen in February 1903, at which time he was living at 87 Crown Street in Aberdeen. He was succeeded by Sir Alexander Lyon in 1905.

Walker died at Richmondhill House on 13 July 1921, at the age of 83.

== Artistic recognition ==
Walker was portrayed by Sir George Reid in 1907, his council colleagues presenting him with the picture as a mark of their respect.

Civic offices
Preceded by John Fleming	Lord Provost of Aberdeen; 1902–1905	Succeeded by Sir Alexander Lyon
