= James Watson (Scottish chemist) =

Scottish chemist and political activist

James Robertson Watson
- Born: 31 May 1859; Parkhead, Glasgow, Scotland
- Scientific career
- Fields: Chemistry

Professor James Robertson Watson (31 May 1859 – 1923) was a Scottish chemist and political activist.

Born in the Parkhead area of Glasgow, Watson was educated at Parkhead Sessional School, Dennistoun Academy and High School of Glasgow before graduating from the University of Glasgow, then studying at the University of Tübingen, University of Geneva and University of Berlin. In 1889, he returned to Glasgow, where he was appointed as Professor of Chemistry at Anderson's College.

Watson was a founder member of the Independent Labour Party (ILP), for which he stood unsuccessfully in 1893 in the Mile End ward of Glasgow City Council, then at the 1895 general election in Glasgow Bridgeton, where he took less than 10% of the vote.

After his second defeat, Watson drifted away from the ILP, but remained politically engaged, and spent the 1900s campaigning on tariff reform. A supporter of World War I, he stood as an independent at the 1917 Aberdeen South by-election, taking second place with 29.4% of the vote, then again in Aberdeen South at the 1918 general election, where his vote dropped back to only 16.8%.

Watson died in 1923, and is buried in Faslane Cemetery.
