= Aberdeen South (UK Parliament constituency) =

Parliamentary constituency in the United Kingdom, 1885 onwards

Coordinates: 57.095°N 2.133°W

- Burgh constituency for the House of Commons
- Boundary of Aberdeen South in Scotland
- Subdivision: Aberdeen City
- Electorate: 76,560 (March 2020)

Current constituency
- Created: 1885
- Member of Parliament: Douglas Lumsden (Conservative)
- Seats: One
- Created from: Aberdeen

Overlaps
- Scottish Parliament: North East Scotland

Aberdeen South is a burgh constituency of the House of Commons of the Parliament of the United Kingdom which elects one Member of Parliament (MP) by the first-past-the-post system of election.

The seat is currently held by Douglas Lumsden of the Scottish Conservatives, who won the seat in a 2026 by-election after Stephen Flynn of the Scottish National Party resigned upon his election as a Member of the Scottish Parliament. Flynn had served as the leader of the SNP in the House of Commons from December 2022 until 10 May 2026.

The constituency was first used in the 1885 general election, but has undergone boundary changes since then. There was also an Aberdeen South Holyrood constituency, a constituency of the Scottish Parliament, created in 1999 with the boundaries of the Westminster constituency at that time. In 2011 the Scottish Parliament constituency of Aberdeen South was abolished and replaced with the Aberdeen South and North Kincardine constituency.

== Constituency profile ==
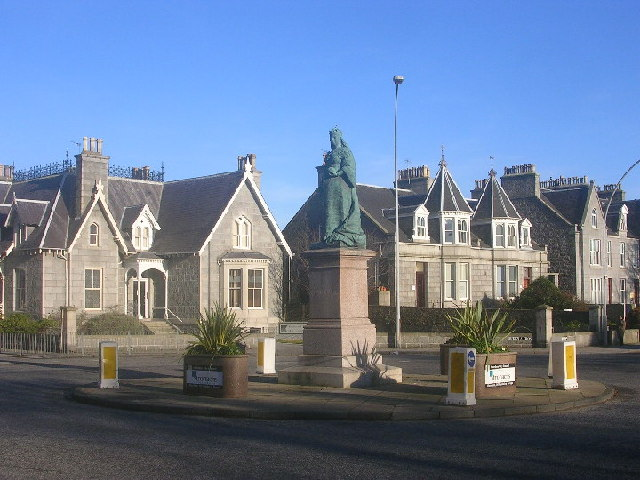
Queens Cross, Aberdeen.

Aberdeen South is an affluent suburban constituency located along the south of the Aberdeen City council area. The seat covers most of Aberdeen's affluent West End and the outer villages of Bieldside, Cults, Milltimber and Peterculter. Situated within the constituency are some of Scotland's most affluent neighbourhoods, including Broomhill, Rubislaw and Queen's Cross, which was named the wealthiest part of Scotland in 2003. The seat also extends south-east across the River Dee to cover the suburb of Cove Bay and the more deprived neighbourhoods of Torry and Kincorth.

== Boundaries ==
=== Historic ===
==== 1885 to 1918 ====
From 1832 to 1885 there was a single Aberdeen constituency. Prior to 1832, the burgh of Aberdeen had been represented as a component of the Aberdeen Burghs constituency.

When Aberdeen South was created by the Redistribution of Seats Act 1885 and first used in the 1885 general election, so was Aberdeen North. Aberdeen South then consisted of the municipal wards of St Nicholas, Rosemount, Rubislaw and Ferryhill, and the 9th Parliamentary Polling District. The rest of the county of Aberdeen was covered by the county constituencies of Eastern Aberdeenshire and Western Aberdeenshire.

The same boundaries were used in the 1886 general election, the 1892 general election, the 1895 general election, the 1900 general election, the 1906 general election, the January 1910 general election and the December 1910 general election.

==== 1918 to 1950 ====
In 1918 constituency boundaries were redefined by the Representation of the People Act 1918. By then the county of city of Aberdeen had been created; Aberdeen North and Aberdeen South became the two constituencies covering the city (which was one of four counties of cities in Scotland) and entirely within the city. The new boundaries were first used in the 1918 general election, and Aberdeen South then consisted of the wards of Ferryhill, Rosemount, Rubislaw, Ruthrieston and St Nicholas. The county of Aberdeen was covered by Aberdeen and Kincardine East, Central Aberdeenshire and Kincardine and West Aberdeenshire. East Aberdeenshire and West Aberdeenshire were entirely within the county of Aberdeen. Kincardine and West Aberdeenshire covered the county of Kincardine (minus the burgh of Inverbervie, which was included in Montrose Burghs) and part of the county of Aberdeen.

The same boundaries were used in the 1922, 1923, 1924, 1929, 1931, 1935 and 1945 general elections.

==== 1950 to 1955 ====
For the 1950 general election boundaries were redefined again, by the House of Commons (Redistribution of Seats) Act 1949. A new list of wards defined Aberdeen South – Ferryhill, Holburn, Rosemount, Rubislaw, Ruthrieston and Torry – but the county of city of Aberdeen remained a two-constituency city, divided between Aberdeen South and Aberdeen North, with both constituencies entirely within the city.

The county of Aberdeen was then again divided between East Aberdeenshire and West Aberdeenshire, with both of these constituencies entirely within the county.

The same boundaries were used for the 1951 general election.

==== 1955 to 1983 ====
By the time of the 1955 general election, a boundary review had taken account of a small enlargement of the city area. However, the same list of wards – Ferryhill, Holburn, Rosemount, Rubislaw, Ruthrieston and Torry – continued to define Aberdeen South, and the same boundaries were used for the 1959 general election, the 1964 general election, the 1966 general election, the 1970 general election, the February 1974 general election and the October 1974 general election.

In 1975, throughout Scotland, under the Local Government (Scotland) Act 1973, counties were abolished, and the enlarged City of Aberdeen district was formed by including areas formerly within the county of Aberdeen and the county of Kincardine. The city became a district within the Grampian region. The enlarged City of Aberdeen district included areas covered by the constituencies of West Aberdeenshire and North Angus and Mearns. North Angus and Mearns had been created in 1950 to cover the county of Kincardine and part of the county of Angus.

The 1979 general election was held before a review of constituency boundaries took account of new local government boundaries.

==== 1983 to 1997 ====
For the 1983 election, the electoral wards used to create this seat were Rosemount, Rubislaw, St Clements, St Nicholas, Hazlehead, Holburn, Ferryhill, Torry, Nigg.

The 1983 general election, the 1987 general election and the 1992 general election took place during this period. At the 1992 general election the constituency was the only seat which Labour had won at the 1987 election to be gained by the Conservatives.

In 1996, under the Local Government etc (Scotland) Act 1994, local government regions and districts were abolished and the city became one of 32 unitary council areas of Scotland. Also, the name of the city became, officially, Aberdeen City.

==== 1997 to 2005 ====
As redefined for the 1997 general election, Aberdeen South was one of three constituencies covering and entirely within the Aberdeen City area, the other two being Aberdeen North and Aberdeen Central. Aberdeen South shared boundaries with both of the other two constituencies.

The same boundaries were used for the 2001 general election.

Map of boundaries 2005–2024

==== 2005 to 2024 ====
As redefined by the Fifth Review of the Boundary Commission for Scotland, and subsequently first used in the 2005 general election, the constituency was entirely within the Aberdeen City council area and one of five constituencies covering that council area and the Aberdeenshire council area.

In this period the constituency was made up of the Aberdeen City Council wards of Queens Cross, Gilcomston, Langstane, Hazlehead, Peterculter, Murtle, Cults, Seafield, Ashley, Broomhill, Garthdee, Gairn, Duthie, Torry, Tullos Hill, Kincorth West, Nigg, Loirston, as provided for by the Parliamentary Constituencies (Scotland) Order 1995.

=== Current ===
Map of boundaries from 2024

Following the 2023 review of Westminster constituencies which came into effect for the 2024 general election, the newly redrawn Aberdeen South consists of the following:

- In full: the Aberdeen City Council wards of George Street/Harbour, Lower Deeside, Hazlehead/Queens Cross/Countesswells, Airyhall/Broomhill/Garthdee, Torry/Ferryhill, Kincorth/Nigg/Cove;
- In part: the Aberdeen City Council ward of Midstocket/Rosemount (small area in southeast of ward).

The city centre and harbour areas (George Street/Harbour ward) were transferred from Aberdeen North.

== Voting patterns ==
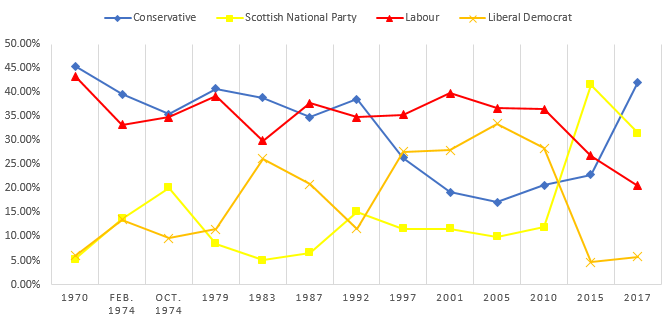
Chart of Aberdeen South elections since the 1970 general election through the 2017 general election.

Aberdeen South was traditionally a strong Liberal Party constituency until it was won by the Unionist Party at the 1918 general election. The constituency subsequently went on to return Unionist MPs to Parliament until the party amalgamated with the Conservatives in 1965. The constituency developed into a Unionist-Labour marginal in 1964 and was gained by Labour's Donald Dewar in 1966, who went on to become the leader of the Scottish Labour Party and later the first-ever First Minister of Scotland in 1999. From the 1970 general election onwards, Aberdeen South returned Conservative MPs to Parliament. The seat was gained by Labour in 1987 and regained by the Conservatives in 1992. At Labour's 1997 landslide election victory Aberdeen South fell to Labour's Anne Begg, who represented the constituency until the 2015 general election when the constituency was gained by Callum McCaig of the Scottish National Party (SNP).

Throughout the 2000s, the Liberal Democrats emerged as the main challenger to Labour in Aberdeen South, taking second place in 2005 behind Labour by just 3.2% of the vote. In the Scottish Parliament the equivalent Aberdeen South constituency was represented by the Liberal Democrats from 1999 until 2011, when the constituency of Aberdeen South and North Kincardine was gained by the SNP. Recently the Conservatives have made a set of substantial advances in Aberdeen South, making gains in the constituency at the 2015 UK general election despite seeing a drop in their national vote share across Scotland. The 2015 election saw a Scottish National Party landslide across Scotland, and for the first time the SNP won the constituency with Callum McCaig. At the 2016 Scottish Parliament election the Conservatives finished in second place in the Aberdeen South and North Kincardine constituency, more than doubling their vote share in the constituency and coming behind the SNP by 8.5% of the vote.

Ross Thomson of the Conservatives went on to gain the seat at the 2017 snap general election with a majority of 4,752 votes (10.6%) ahead of the sitting SNP MP Callum McCaig.

In 2019, the seat went back to the SNP when Thomson declined to stand again after a scandal. Stephen Flynn became the MP with a majority of 3,990 votes with 44.7% of the vote. This means that in the 10 years between 2010 and 2019, four MPs from three different parties had represented the seat. Notably, since 1964 no candidate has ever managed to secure an absolute majority – 50% of the vote or more.

At the 2024 election, Flynn held on to the seat despite a significant drop in his share of the vote, as the Conservative vote also fell, resulting in Labour gaining second place for the first time since 2015.

== Members of Parliament ==
Election	Member	Party
1885	James Bryce	Liberal
1907 by-election	George Esslemont	Liberal
1917 by-election	John Fleming	Coalition Liberal
1918	Sir Frederick Thomson, Bt.	Unionist
1935 by-election	Sir Douglas Thomson, Bt.	Unionist
1946 by-election	Lady Tweedsmuir	Unionist
1965	Lady Tweedsmuir	Conservative
1966	Donald Dewar	Labour
1970	Iain Sproat	Conservative
1983	Gerry Malone	Conservative
1987	Frank Doran	Labour
1992	Raymond Robertson	Conservative
1997	Dame Anne Begg	Labour
2015	Callum McCaig	Scottish National Party
2017	Ross Thomson	Conservative
2019	Stephen Flynn	Scottish National Party
2026 by-election	Douglas Lumsden	Conservative

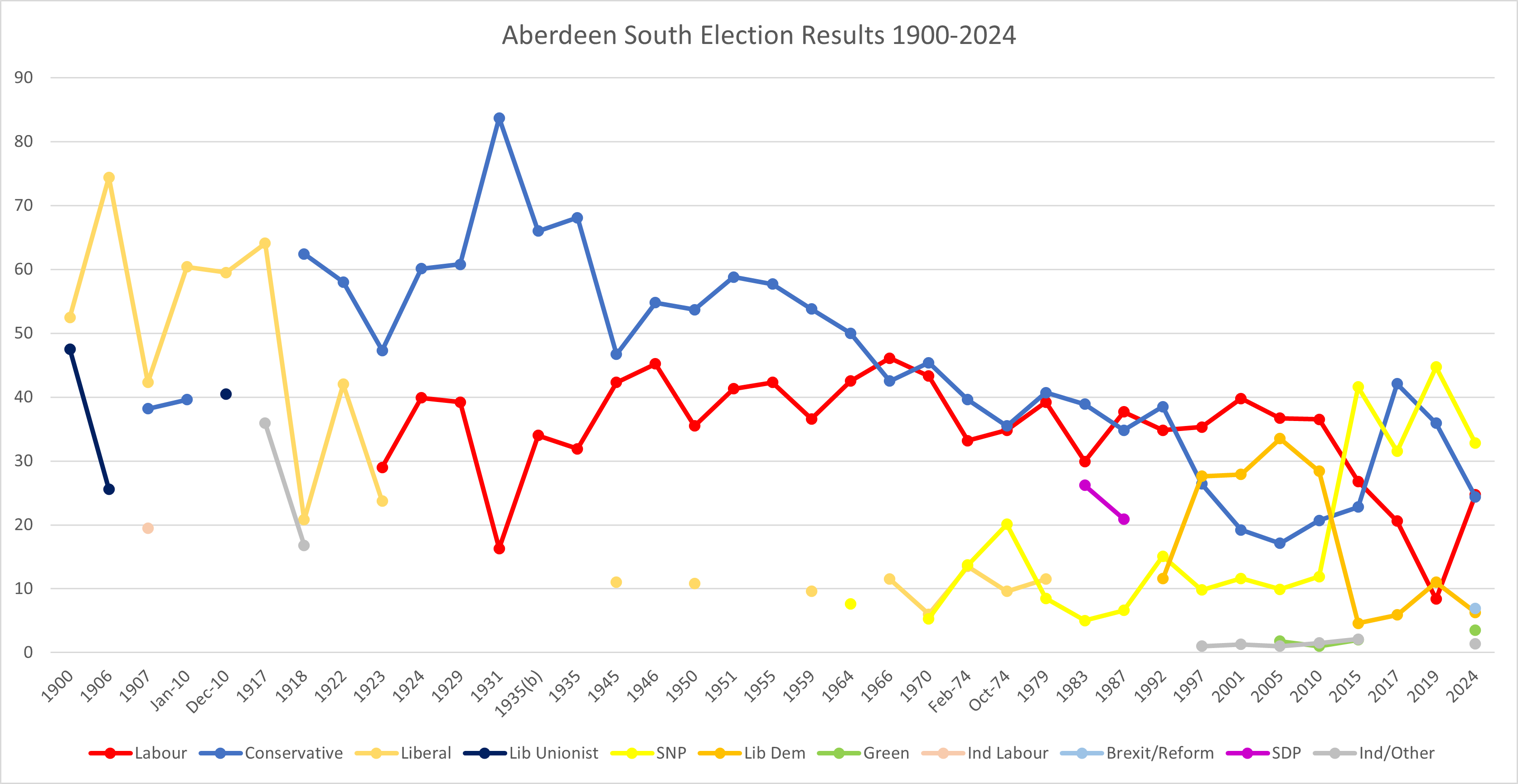
Graph showing Aberdeen South Election Results 1900-2024

== Elections ==
=== Elections in the 2020s ===
2026 Aberdeen South by-election
Party	Candidate	Votes	%	±%
Conservative	Douglas Lumsden	14,308	49.5	+25.1
SNP	Richard Thomson	8,258	28.6	−4.2
Reform	Jo Hart	2,478	8.6	+1.7
Labour	Nurul Hoque Ali	1,550	5.4	−19.3
Liberal Democrats	Mel Sullivan	1,270	4.4	−1.9
Green	Jorg Shelton-Eckstein	974	3.4	−0.1
Alliance for Democracy and Freedom	David Ballantine	59	0.2	New
Majority		6,050	20.9	N/A
Turnout		28,897	38.0	−21.9
Rejected ballots		53	0.2	
Registered electors		76,033		
Conservative gain from SNP		Swing	+14.7	

2024 general election: Aberdeen South
Party	Candidate	Votes	%	±%
SNP	Stephen Flynn	15,213	32.8	−12.5
Labour	M. Tauqeer Malik	11,455	24.7	+15.9
Conservative	John Wheeler	11,300	24.4	−10.0
Reform	Michael Pearce	3,199	6.9	+6.5
Liberal Democrats	Jeff Goodhall	2,921	6.3	−4.4
Green	Guy Ingerson	1,609	3.5	+3.0
Scottish Family	Graeme Craib	423	0.9	N/A
Independent	Sophie Molly	225	0.5	N/A
Majority		3,758	8.1	−2.8
Turnout		46,345	59.9	−9.5
SNP hold		Swing	−14.2	

=== Elections in the 2010s ===
2019 notional result (Note: Estimate of the 2019 general election result as if the revised boundaries recommended under the 2023 boundary review were in place)
Party	Vote	%
SNP	22,683	45.3
Conservative	17,220	34.4
Liberal Democrats	5,358	10.7
Labour	4,394	8.8
Scottish Greens	268	0.5
Brexit Party	195	0.4
Majority	5,463	10.9
Turnout	50,118	65.5
Electorate	76,560	

2019 general election: Aberdeen South
Party	Candidate	Votes	%	±%
SNP	Stephen Flynn	20,388	44.7	+13.2
Conservative	Douglas Lumsden	16,398	35.9	−6.2
Liberal Democrats	Ian Yuill	5,018	11.0	+5.2
Labour	Shona Simpson	3,834	8.4	−12.2
Majority		3,990	8.8	N/A
Turnout		45,638	69.4	+0.9
Registered electors		65,719		
SNP gain from Conservative		Swing	+9.7	

2017 general election: Aberdeen South
Party	Candidate	Votes	%	±%
Conservative	Ross Thomson	18,746	42.1	+19.3
SNP	Callum McCaig	13,994	31.5	−10.1
Labour	Callum O'Dwyer	9,143	20.6	−6.2
Liberal Democrats	Jenny Wilson	2,610	5.9	+1.3
Majority		4,752	10.6	N/A
Turnout		44,493	68.5	−2.8
Registered electors		64,964		
Conservative gain from SNP		Swing	+14.8	

2015 general election: Aberdeen South
Party	Candidate	Votes	%	±%
SNP	Callum McCaig	20,221	41.6	+29.7
Labour	Anne Begg	12,991	26.8	−9.8
Conservative	Ross Thomson	11,087	22.8	+2.1
Liberal Democrats	Denis Rixon	2,252	4.6	−23.8
Green	Dan Yeats	964	2.0	+1.0
UKIP	Sandra Skinner	897	1.8	N/A
Independent	Christopher Gray	139	0.3	N/A
Majority		7,230	14.8	N/A
Turnout		48,551	71.3	+4.1
Registered electors		68,056		
SNP gain from Labour		Swing	+19.8	

2010 general election: Aberdeen South
Party	Candidate	Votes	%	±%
Labour	Anne Begg	15,722	36.5	−0.2
Liberal Democrats	John Sleigh	12,216	28.4	−5.1
Conservative	Amanda Harvie	8,914	20.7	+3.6
SNP	Mark McDonald	5,102	11.9	+2.0
BNP	Susan Ross	529	1.2	N/A
Green	Rhonda Reekie	413	1.0	−0.9
SACL	Robert Green	138	0.3	N/A
Majority		3,506	8.1	+4.9
Turnout		43,034	67.2	+5.1
Registered electors		64,031		
Labour hold		Swing	+2.5	

=== Elections in the 2000s ===
2005 general election: Aberdeen South
Party	Candidate	Votes	%	±%
Labour	Anne Begg	15,272	36.7	
Liberal Democrats	Vicki Harris	13,924	33.5	
Conservative	Stewart Whyte	7,134	17.1	
SNP	Maureen Watt	4,120	9.9	
Green	Rhonda Reekie	768	1.8	
Scottish Socialist	Donald Munro	403	1.0	
Majority		1,348	3.2	
Turnout		41,621	62.1	
Labour win (new boundaries)				

2001 general election: Aberdeen South
Party	Candidate	Votes	%	±%
Labour	Anne Begg	14,696	39.8	+4.5
Liberal Democrats	Ian Yuill	10,308	27.9	+0.3
Conservative	Moray Macdonald	7,098	19.2	−7.2
SNP	Ian Angus	4,293	11.6	±0.0
Scottish Socialist	David Watt	495	1.3	N/A
Majority		4,388	11.9	+4.2
Turnout		36,890	62.5	−10.3
Registered electors		59,025		
Labour hold		Swing	+2.5	

=== Elections in the 1990s ===
1997 general election: Aberdeen South
Party	Candidate	Votes	%	±%
Labour	Anne Begg	15,541	35.3	
Liberal Democrats	Nicol Stephen	12,176	27.6	
Conservative	Raymond Robertson	11,621	26.4	
SNP	Jim Towers	4,299	11.6	
Referendum	Ric Wharton	425	1.0	
Majority		3,365	7.7	
Turnout		44,062	72.8	
Labour win (new boundaries)				

1992 general election: Aberdeen South
Party	Candidate	Votes	%	±%
Conservative	Raymond Robertson	15,808	38.5	+3.7
Labour	Frank Doran	14,291	34.8	−2.9
SNP	James Davidson	6,223	15.1	+8.5
Liberal Democrats	Irene Keith	4,767	11.6	−9.3
Majority		1,517	3.7	N/A
Turnout		41,089	70.2	+3.1
Registered electors		58,881		
Conservative gain from Labour		Swing	+3.3	

=== Elections in the 1980s ===
1987 general election: Aberdeen South
Party	Candidate	Votes	%	±%
Labour	Frank Doran	15,917	37.7	+7.8
Conservative	Gerry Malone	14,719	34.8	−4.1
SDP	Ian Philip	8,844	20.9	−5.3
SNP	Michael Weir	2,776	6.6	+1.6
Majority		1,198	2.9	N/A
Turnout		42,256	67.1	−1.6
Registered electors		62,943		
Labour gain from Conservative		Swing	+6.0	

1983 general election: Aberdeen South
Party	Candidate	Votes	%	±%
Conservative	Gerry Malone	15,393	38.9	
Labour	Robert Middleton	11,812	29.9	
SDP	Ian Philip	10,372	26.2	
SNP	Sam Coull	1,974	5.0	
Majority		3,581	9.0	
Turnout		39,551	68.7	
Conservative win (new boundaries)				

=== Elections in the 1970s ===
1979 general election: Aberdeen South
Party	Candidate	Votes	%	±%
Conservative	Iain Sproat	20,820	40.7	+5.3
Labour	Norman Godman	20,048	39.2	+4.4
Liberal	Helen Pitt-Watson	5,901	11.5	+1.9
SNP	Alexander Stronach	4,361	8.5	−11.6
Majority		772	1.5	+0.8
Turnout		54,430	78.6	+0.2
Registered electors		65,090		
Conservative hold		Swing	+0.4	

October 1974 general election: Aberdeen South
Party	Candidate	Votes	%	±%
Conservative	Iain Sproat	18,475	35.5	−4.2
Labour	Robert Middleton	18,110	34.8	+1.6
SNP	Alexander Stronach	10,481	20.1	+6.4
Liberal	Angus Abercrombie Robbie	5,018	9.6	−3.8
Majority		365	0.7	−5.7
Turnout		52,204	76.3	−5.9
Registered electors		68,241		
Conservative hold		Swing	+2.9	

February 1974 general election: Aberdeen South
Party	Candidate	Votes	%	±%
Conservative	Iain Sproat	21,938	39.6	−6.8
Labour	Robert Middleton	18,380	33.2	−10.1
SNP	Alexander Stronach	7,599	13.7	+8.4
Liberal	Angus Abercrombie Robbie	7,447	13.5	+7.5
Majority		3,558	6.4	+4.4
Turnout		55,366	82.2	+5.1
Registered electors		67,379		
Conservative hold		Swing	−8.5	

1970 general election: Aberdeen South
Party	Candidate	Votes	%	±%
Conservative	Iain Sproat	23,843	45.4	+2.9
Labour	Donald Dewar	22,754	43.3	−2.8
Liberal	Kenneth McLeod	3,135	6.0	−5.5
SNP	Bruce Mavor Cockie	2,777	5.3	N/A
Majority		1,089	2.1	N/A
Turnout		52,509	77.1	−4.2
Registered electors		68,147		
Conservative gain from Labour		Swing	+2.8	

=== Elections in the 1960s ===
1966 general election: Aberdeen South
Party	Candidate	Votes	%	±%
Labour	Donald Dewar	23,291	46.1	+3.7
Conservative	Priscilla Buchan	21,492	42.5	−7.5
Liberal	Norman W. King	5,797	11.5	N/A
Majority		1,799	3.6	N/A
Turnout		50,580	81.3	−2.5
Registered electors		62,206		
Labour gain from Conservative		Swing	+5.6	

1964 general election: Aberdeen South
Party	Candidate	Votes	%	±%
Unionist	Priscilla Buchan	25,824	50.0	−3.8
Labour	Donald Dewar	21,926	42.5	+5.9
SNP	John Reid	3,898	7.6	N/A
Majority		3,898	7.6	−9.7
Turnout		51,648	83.8	+2.2
Registered electors		61,636		
Unionist hold		Swing	+4.8	

=== Elections in the 1950s ===
1959 general election: Aberdeen South
Party	Candidate	Votes	%	±%
Unionist	Priscilla Buchan	25,471	53.8	−3.9
Labour	Peter Doig	17,349	36.6	−5.7
Liberal	Elma Tryphosa Dangerfield	4,558	9.6	N/A
Majority		8,122	17.2	+1.7
Turnout		47,378	81.6	+0.5
Registered electors		58,086		
Unionist hold		Swing	−1.7	

1955 general election: Aberdeen South
Party	Candidate	Votes	%
Unionist	Priscilla Buchan	26,817	57.7
Labour	Judith Hart	19,627	42.3
Majority		7,190	15.5
Turnout		46,444	81.1
Unionist win (new boundaries)			

1951 general election: Aberdeen South
Party	Candidate	Votes	%	±%
Unionist	Priscilla Buchan	28,947	58.8	+5.1
Labour	Sinclair Shaw	20,325	41.3	+5.7
Majority		8,622	17.5	−0.6
Turnout		49,272	82.7	−1.8
Registered electors		59,589		
Unionist hold		Swing	+5.4	

1950 general election: Aberdeen South
Party	Candidate	Votes	%
Unionist	Priscilla Buchan	26,128	53.7
Labour	Olive Crutchley	17,302	35.5
Liberal	Richard Pirie	5,248	10.8
Majority		8,826	18.1
Turnout		58,680	84.9
Unionist win (new boundaries)			

=== Elections in the 1940s ===
1946 Aberdeen South by-election
Party	Candidate	Votes	%	±%
Unionist	Priscilla Buchan	21,750	54.8	+8.1
Labour	Arthur Irvine	17,911	45.2	+2.8
Majority		3,839	9.7	+5.3
Turnout		39,661		
Unionist hold		Swing	+5.4	

1945 general election: Aberdeen South
Party	Candidate	Votes	%	±%
Unionist	Douglas Thomson	19,214	46.7	−26.6
Labour	William McLaine	17,398	42.3	+10.5
Liberal	James Logie Milne	4,501	11.0	N/A
Majority		1,816	4.4	−31.9
Turnout		41,113	72.2	+6.4
Registered electors		56,943		
Unionist hold		Swing	+13.5	

=== Elections in the 1930s ===
1935 general election: Aberdeen South
Party	Candidate	Votes	%	±%
Unionist	Douglas Thomson	25,270	68.1	−15.5
Labour	George Rettie McIntosh	11,817	31.9	+15.6
Majority		13,453	36.3	−27.9
Turnout		37,087	65.9	−10.0
Registered electors		56,319		
Unionist hold		Swing	−15.5	

1935 Aberdeen South by-election
Party	Candidate	Votes	%	±%
Unionist	Douglas Thomson	20,925	66.0	−17.6
Labour	Joseph Forbes Duncan	10,760	34.0	+17.6
Majority		10,165	32.1	−35.3
Turnout		31,685	75.8	±0.0
Unionist hold		Swing		

1931 general election: Aberdeen South
Party	Candidate	Votes	%	±%
Unionist	Frederick Thomson	33,988	83.7	+22.8
Labour	George Catto	6,627	16.3	−22.9
Majority		27,361	67.4	+45.8
Turnout		40,115	75.8	+8.6
Unionist hold		Swing	+22.9	

=== Elections in the 1920s ===
1929 general election: Aberdeen South
Party	Candidate	Votes	%	±%
Unionist	Frederick Thomson	21,548	60.8	+0.7
Labour	William Martin	13,868	39.2	−0.7
Majority		7,680	21.6	+1.4
Turnout		35,416	67.2	−1.6
Unionist hold		Swing	−0.7	

1924 general election: Aberdeen South
Party	Candidate	Votes	%	±%
Unionist	Frederick Thomson	16,092	60.1	+12.8
Labour	George Archibald	10,699	39.9	+10.9
Majority		5,393	20.2	+1.9
Turnout		26,791	68.8	+8.1
Registered electors		38,958		
Unionist hold		Swing	+1.0	

Mallet

1923 general election: Aberdeen South
Party	Candidate	Votes	%	±%
Unionist	Frederick Thomson	11,258	47.3	−10.7
Labour	John Paton	6,911	29.0	N/A
Liberal	Charles Mallet	5,641	23.7	−18.3
Majority		4,347	18.3	+2.3
Turnout		23,810	60.7	+3.2
Unionist hold		Swing		

1922 general election: Aberdeen South
Party	Candidate	Votes	%	±%
Unionist	Frederick Thomson	13,208	58.0	−4.4
Liberal	Charles Mallet	9,573	42.0	+21.2
Majority		3,635	16.0	−25.6
Turnout		22,781	57.5	+13.6
Unionist hold		Swing	−12.8	

=== Elections in the 1910s ===
1918 general election: Aberdeen South
Party		Candidate	Votes	%
C	Unionist	Frederick Thomson	10,625	62.4
	Liberal	John Fleming	3,535	20.8
	Independent	James Watson	2,868	16.8
Majority			7,090	41.6
Turnout			17,028	43.9
	Unionist win (new boundaries)			
C indicates candidate endorsed by the coalition government.

Fleming

1917 Aberdeen South by-election
Party	Candidate	Votes	%	±%
National Liberal	John Fleming	3,283	64.1	+4.6
Independent National	James Watson	1,507	29.4	N/A
Peace by Negotiation	Frederick Pethick-Lawrence	333	6.5	N/A
Majority		1,776	34.7	+15.7
Turnout		5,123	37.1	−35.1
Registered electors		13,791		
National Liberal hold		Swing	N/A	

December 1910 general election: Aberdeen South
Party	Candidate	Votes	%	±%
Liberal	George Esslemont	5,862	59.5	−0.9
Liberal Unionist	William C. Smith	3,997	40.5	+0.9
Majority		1,865	19.0	−1.8
Turnout		9,859	72.2	−10.7
Registered electors		13,657		
Liberal hold		Swing	−0.9	

January 1910 general election: Aberdeen South
Party	Candidate	Votes	%	±%
Liberal	George Esslemont	6,749	60.4	−14.0
Unionist	Ronald McNeill	4,433	39.6	+14.0
Majority		2,316	20.8	−28.0
Turnout		11,182	82.9	+12.7
Registered electors		13,496		
Liberal hold		Swing	−14.0	

=== Elections in the 1900s ===
1907 Aberdeen South by-election
Party	Candidate	Votes	%	±%
Liberal	George Esslemont	3,779	42.3	−32.1
Conservative	Ronald McNeill	3,412	38.2	+12.6
Independent Labour	Fred Bramley	1,740	19.5	N/A
Majority		367	4.1	−44.7
Turnout		8,931	68.4	−1.8
Registered electors		13,053		
Liberal hold		Swing	−22.4	

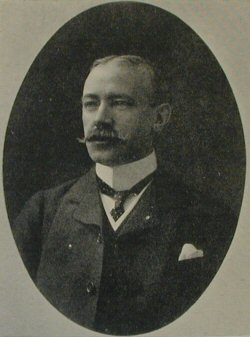
Black

1906 general election: Aberdeen South
Party	Candidate	Votes	%	±%
Liberal	James Bryce	6,780	74.4	+21.9
Liberal Unionist	William George Black	2,332	25.6	−21.9
Majority		4,448	48.8	+43.8
Turnout		9,112	70.2	−0.7
Registered electors		12,980		
Liberal hold		Swing	+21.9	

1900 general election: Aberdeen South
Party	Candidate	Votes	%	±%
Liberal	James Bryce	4,238	52.5	−3.6
Liberal Unionist	William Charles Smith	3,830	47.5	+3.6
Majority		408	5.0	−7.2
Turnout		8,068	70.9	−2.1
Registered electors		11,383		
Liberal hold		Swing	−3.6	

=== Elections in the 1890s ===
James Bryce

1895 general election: Aberdeen South
Party	Candidate	Votes	%	±%
Liberal	James Bryce	3,985	56.1	+0.1
Liberal Unionist	David Stewart	3,121	43.9	+15.7
Majority		864	12.2	−15.6
Turnout		7,106	73.0	+2.3
Registered electors		9,731		
Liberal hold		Swing	−7.8	

1892 Aberdeen South by-election
Party	Candidate	Votes	%	±%
Liberal	James Bryce	Unopposed		
Liberal hold				

1892 general election: Aberdeen South
Party	Candidate	Votes	%	±%
Liberal	James Bryce	3,513	56.0	
Liberal Unionist	James McCullagh	1,768	28.2	
Scottish Trades Councils	Henry Hyde Champion	991	15.8	
Majority		1,745	27.8	
Turnout		6,272	70.7	
Liberal hold		Swing		

=== Elections in the 1880s ===
1886 general election: Aberdeen South
Party	Candidate	Votes	%	±%
Liberal	James Bryce	Unopposed		
Liberal hold				

1885 general election: Aberdeen South
Party	Candidate	Votes	%
Liberal	James Bryce	4,548	75.8
Conservative	Colin McKenzie	1,455	24.2
Majority		3,093	51.6
Turnout		6,003	76.8
Registered electors		7,813	
Liberal win (new seat)			

== Notes ==
Parliament of the United Kingdom
Preceded by Ross, Skye and Lochaber	Constituency represented by the Leader of the Scottish National Party in Westminster; 2022–2026	Succeeded by Angus and Perthshire Glens
