= Anne Begg =

British politician

Dame Anne Begg DBE
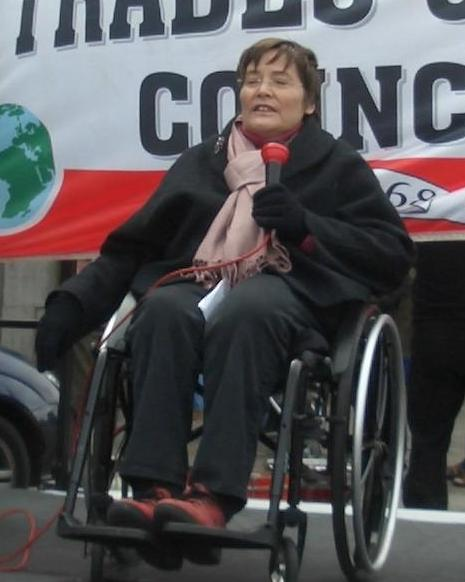
- Begg in 2008

Chair of the Work and Pensions Select Committee
- In office 10 June 2010 – 30 March 2015
- Preceded by: Terry Rooney
- Succeeded by: Frank Field

Member of Parliament for Aberdeen South
- In office 1 May 1997 – 30 March 2015
- Preceded by: Raymond Robertson
- Succeeded by: Callum McCaig

Personal details
- Born: Margaret Anne Begg; 6 December 1955 (age 70) Brechin, Angus, Scotland
- Party: Labour
- Education: University of Aberdeen

Dame Margaret Anne Begg DBE (born 6 December 1955) is a Scottish politician who served as Member of Parliament (MP) for Aberdeen South from 1997 to 2015. A member of the Labour Party, she was Chair of the Work and Pensions Select Committee from 2010 to 2015.

Upon her election to Parliament, Begg became the first permanent wheelchair user in the House of Commons since the 19th century.

== Education and early career ==
Margaret Anne Begg was educated in Brechin, Angus at Damacre Primary School and Brechin High School. She earned an MA in History and Politics at the University of Aberdeen, and a Secondary Teaching Certificate from the Aberdeen College of Education in 1978.

After gaining her teaching certificate, Begg taught English and History at Webster's High School, Kirriemuir. She became the principal English teacher at Arbroath Academy in 1988.

== Parliamentary career ==
Following her involvement in teaching unions, Begg joined the Labour Party in 1983. She was selected to stand for Parliament, through an all-women shortlist, as Labour candidate for Aberdeen South. Begg was encouraged to stand by Frank Doran, the former Labour MP for the constituency. At the 1997 general election, she defeated incumbent Conservative MP and government minister Raymond Robertson. She became the second ever permanent wheelchair user in the House of Commons upon her election.

She was re-elected in 2001, 2005 and 2010, becoming the first Labour MP to retain her constituency for more than a single term. At the 2015 general election, Begg lost her seat to SNP candidate Callum McCaig.

Begg made her maiden speech on 21 May 1997. She served as secretary of the All-party parliamentary group (APPG) on the BBC, and chair of the APPGs on Equalities, the Oil and Gas Industry, Chronic Pain, and Commercial Radio. She was a member of the Panel of Chairs and Vice Chair of the Speaker's Conference, tasked with looking at the under representation of disadvantaged groups in the Commons. Begg served as Chair of the Work and Pensions Select Committee from June 2010 until the dissolution of Parliament in 2015.

=== Votes and political views ===
Begg voted in favour of banning smoking in restaurants in April 2003. In December 2004 and October 2005, she voted in favour of the Identity Cards Bill. She voted in favour of allowing unmarried heterosexual and homosexual couples to adopt, and in favour of the Civil Partnership Bill.

In March 2002, she voted to ban the hunting of wild mammals with dogs. She voted in favour of the NHS foundation trust proposal and against the replacement of the Trident system.

She voted in favour of adding clauses to a bill that allow the Secretary of State to detain indefinitely, pending deportation, anyone he suspects is a terrorist, even if the law forbids that person's deportation from ever taking place. She voted against allowing people detained at a police station to be fingerprinted and searched for identifying birthmarks unless it is in connection with a terrorism investigation.

In March 2003, she voted against the declaration of war against Iraq.

In June 2003, she voted against a motion that would have recalled the Prime Minister's assertion that Iraq had weapons of mass destruction that could be used at 45 minutes' notice, and launching an independent inquiry into the intelligence received and the decisions that were based on it. In June 2007, she voted against a motion calling for an independent inquiry by a committee of Privy Counsellors into the Iraq War.

In November 2008, Begg was one of 18 MPs who signed a Commons motion backing a Team GB football team at the 2012 Olympics, saying football "should not be any different from other competing sports and our young talent should be allowed to show their skills on the world stage". The football governing bodies of Scotland, Wales and Northern Ireland are all opposed to a Great Britain team, fearing it would stop them competing as individual nations in future tournaments.

During the 2009 MPs expenses scandal, Begg was one of the first Scottish MPs to take the step of publishing all of her claims under the Additional Costs Allowance on her website before they were released by the House of Commons authorities saying that it was "important people can see how MPs spend taxpayers' money."

In June 2011, Begg crossed swords with Philip Davies, Conservative MP for Shipley, over the issue of disabled people being allowed to work for less than minimum wage if they so choose in order to establish themselves in employment. Davies explained that he was representing the views of constituents anxious to get a foothold on the earnings ladder, but Begg believed that this was simply an attempt to discriminate against disabled people.

=== National campaigns ===
Begg is a vocal campaigner for allowing embryonic stem cells to be used in the research for treatments of diseases, including currently incurable conditions such as Alzheimer's and Parkinson's Disease. She has also been heavily involved in lobbying the Department of Health against an all-out ban on the pain-relief drug co-proxamol, used by many people who live with chronic pain conditions.

She has also taken the lead in lobbying the government on issues such as the Seafarer's Earnings Deduction and compensation for trawlermen who lost their livelihoods during the Cod Wars. In the 2009 Budget, Begg also won a concession from the Chancellor of the Exchequer, Alistair Darling MP, that "those caring responsibilities of grandparents of working age will count towards their entitlement to the basic state pension." Begg had campaigned for grandparents of working age to receive National Insurance Credits in recognition of the fact that their caring role may impact on their contributions to their state pension entitlement.

In the Commons, Begg criticised fraudsters who take advantage of vulnerable people through mail scams and pyramid schemes.

=== Local campaigns ===
Begg was critical of Aberdeen City Council's budget cuts in 2008, and dubbed their behaviour as "draconian" after the council set a debt collection agency on an 80-year-old partially sighted woman for £17.50.

Begg wrote to the Scottish First Minister Alex Salmond requesting a change to the house buying system in Scotland. She also criticised plans to close an Aberdeen school 18 months after it had been saved, saying that they were "closing the school by stealth."

== Personal life and honours ==
Begg lives with Gaucher's disease and has been a wheelchair user since 1984. She won the Disabled Scot of the Year award in 1988.

In November 1999, she was knocked from her wheelchair in a road accident outside Aberdeen Airport. Begg sustained a broken leg and wrist, and was hospitalised for three months.

She was appointed Dame Commander of the Order of the British Empire (DBE) in the 2011 New Year Honours, for 'services to disabled people and to equal opportunities'.

Parliament of the United Kingdom
| Preceded by Raymond Robertson | Member of Parliament for Aberdeen South; 1997–2015 | Succeeded by Callum McCaig |
