= Raymond Robertson (politician) =

Scottish politician

Raymond Scott Robertson (born 11 December 1959 in Hamilton, Scotland) is a Scottish Conservative politician.

== Early life ==
He was educated at Glasgow University, graduating Master of Arts with Honours in Modern History and Politics. During the 1980s he taught Modern Studies at Dumbarton Academy and Smithycroft Secondary School in Glasgow's East End.

== Parliamentary career ==
After unsuccessfully contesting Clydesdale in 1987, he was selected as Scottish Conservative and Unionist Party candidate for Aberdeen South. In a surprise result, at the 1992 general election, he was elected as member of parliament (MP) for Aberdeen South, defeating Labour's Frank Doran, who had held the seat since 1987. In July 1995 he was appointed as Parliamentary Under-Secretary at the Scottish Office, a post he held until the 1997 general election. Robertson lost his Aberdeen South seat to Labour's Anne Begg at the 1997 general election.

== Outside Parliament ==
Following the election, in May 1997, he became Scottish Conservative and Unionist Party Chairman. In 2001, he resigned after unsuccessfully contesting the Eastwood constituency at the 2001 general election and the subsequent resignation of William Hague, the then Conservative Party leader.

After politics he became a founding director of Halogen Communications Ltd, a public affairs and public relations consultancy with offices in Edinburgh and Washington, D.C.

Parliament of the United Kingdom
Preceded by Frank Doran	Member of Parliament for Aberdeen South; 1992–1997	Succeeded by Anne Begg
Political offices
Preceded by Michael Hirst	Chairman of Scottish Conservative and Unionist Party; 1997–2001	Succeeded by David Mitchell
