= Daniel Mearns =

Lord Provost of Aberdeen, Scotland, UK

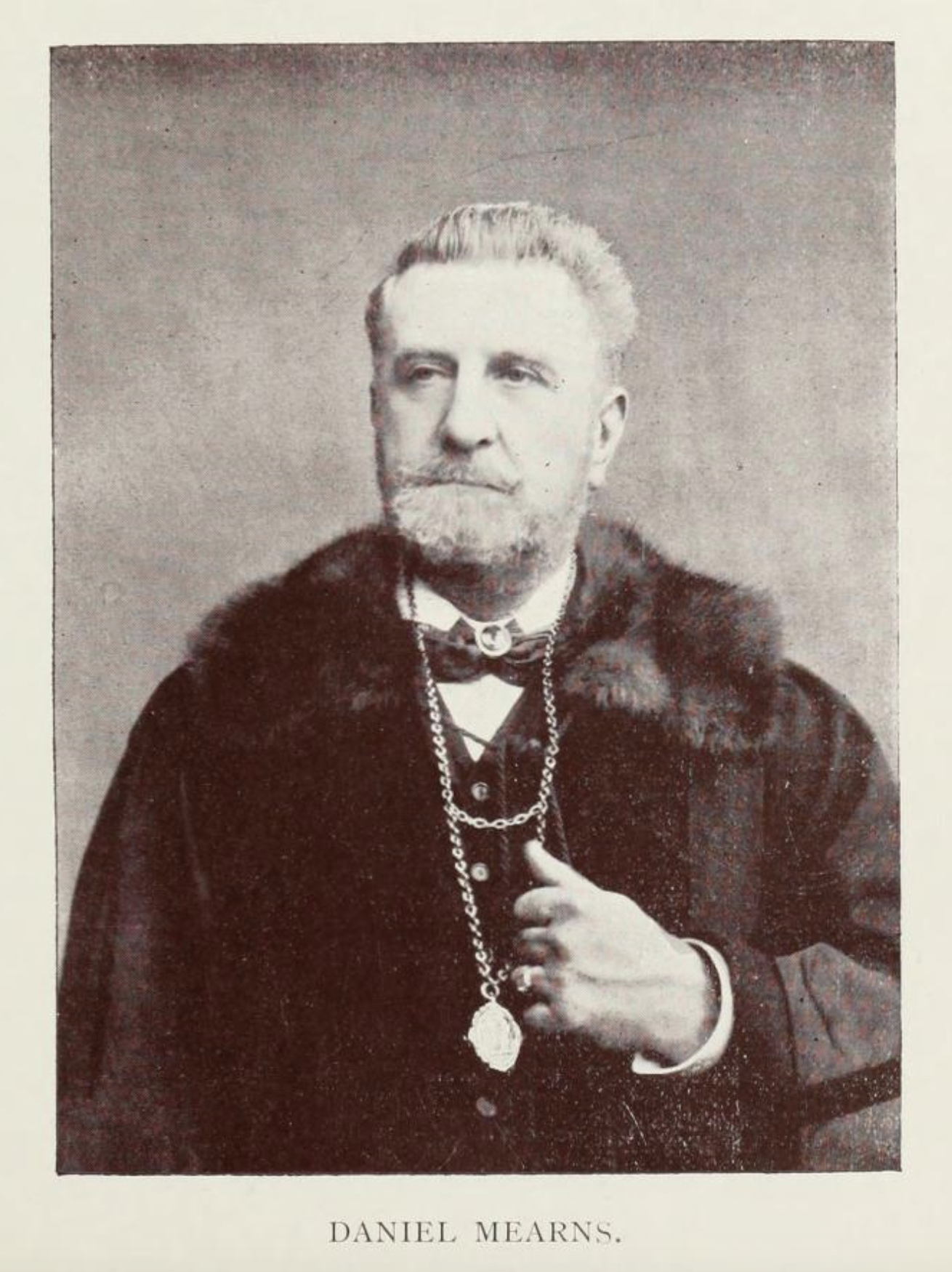
Daniel Mearns

Daniel Mearns (1838–1913) was a Scottish shipping merchant who served as Lord Provost of Aberdeen.

== Life ==
He was the youngest son of Daniel Mearns a shipmaster of the barque "Helen", named after his wife, Helen Adam. He was apprenticed as a ships chandler with P Buyers at Regent Quay in Aberdeen.

He entered Aberdeen City Council in 1876, also joining the Aberdeen Harbour Board and in 1899 the Fishery Board for Scotland. He was Scottish consul to Argentina and a Governor of Robert Gordon's College.

In 1895 he was elected Lord Provost of Aberdeen. During his time as provost he campaigned for the first Aberdeen tramway and enlarged the main market. He was succeeded in 1898 by John Fleming.

In 1900 he was created Deputy Lieutenant of Aberdeen.

He died on 12 February 1913.

Civic offices
Preceded by David Stewart	Lord Provost of Aberdeen; 1895–1898	Succeeded by John Fleming
