= 1935 Aberdeen South by-election =

British parliamentary by-election

The 1935 Aberdeen South by-election was held on 21 May 1935. The by-election was held due to the death of the incumbent Conservative MP, Sir Frederick Thomson, 1st Baronet. It was won by the Conservative candidate Sir Douglas Thomson.

Arthur Woodburn, the Secretary of the Scottish Labour Party, wrote a report in June 1935 for the NEC in which he claimed that national issues were key to public support for the Unionist candidate. The recent Budget and King George V's Silver Jubilee had increased the prestige of the National Government. Woodburn also claimed that Labour's commitment to nationalisation of the banks had frightened people, especially the poor, and that the "growing war atmosphere was shaking people's faith in the ability of the League of Nations to guarantee security". Thomson had proclaimed his policy as "Peace by Preparedness" (i.e. increased armaments) and Woodburn claimed that this was extremely popular with the constituency: "The positive passion for Peace which gave us such a powerful plea in earlier elections was not so effective under the shadow of Hitler's threats".

== Result ==
Aberdeen South by-election, 1935
Party	Candidate	Votes	%	±%
Unionist	Douglas Thomson	20,925	66.04	−17.64
Labour	Joseph Forbes Duncan	10,760	33.96	+17.64
Majority		10,165	32.08	−35.29
Turnout		31,685	75.8	0.0
Unionist hold		Swing		
