= John Fleming (Scottish politician) =

Scottish liberal politician and businessman (1847–1925)

Sir John Fleming

Sir John Fleming DL (1847 – 25 February 1925) was a Scottish liberal politician and businessman.

== Life ==
Fleming was born in Dundee, son of John Fleming and Ann McIntosh. His father was a grocer, living and trading at 53 West Port in Dundee. He was educated in Dundee at Brown Street School and at the High School of Dundee. He set up business as timber merchant at Footdee in Aberdeen.

He was Lord Provost of Aberdeen from 1898 to 1902 and MP for Aberdeen South from 1917 to 1918. He was the first Lord Lieutenant of Aberdeen, and the younger brother of Robert Fleming. He contested Aberdeen South again at the 1918 general election when aged over 70, but was heavily defeated by the Unionist Frederick Thomson. He was also first Lord Lieutenant of Aberdeen.

He married in 1870 Elizabeth, daughter of John Dow, of Dundee, and had three sons and four daughters.

He died of malaria in Pretoria, South Africa, contracted while in Rhodesia.

== Artistic recognition ==
He was portrayed by Robert Brough in 1897.

Parliament of the United Kingdom
Preceded by George Esslemont	Member of Parliament for Aberdeen South; 1917–1918	Succeeded by Sir Frederick Thomson
Civic offices
Preceded by Daniel Mearns	Lord Provost of Aberdeen; 1898–1902	Succeeded by James Walker of Richmondhill
