= Sir Francis Vernon Thomson, 1st Baronet =

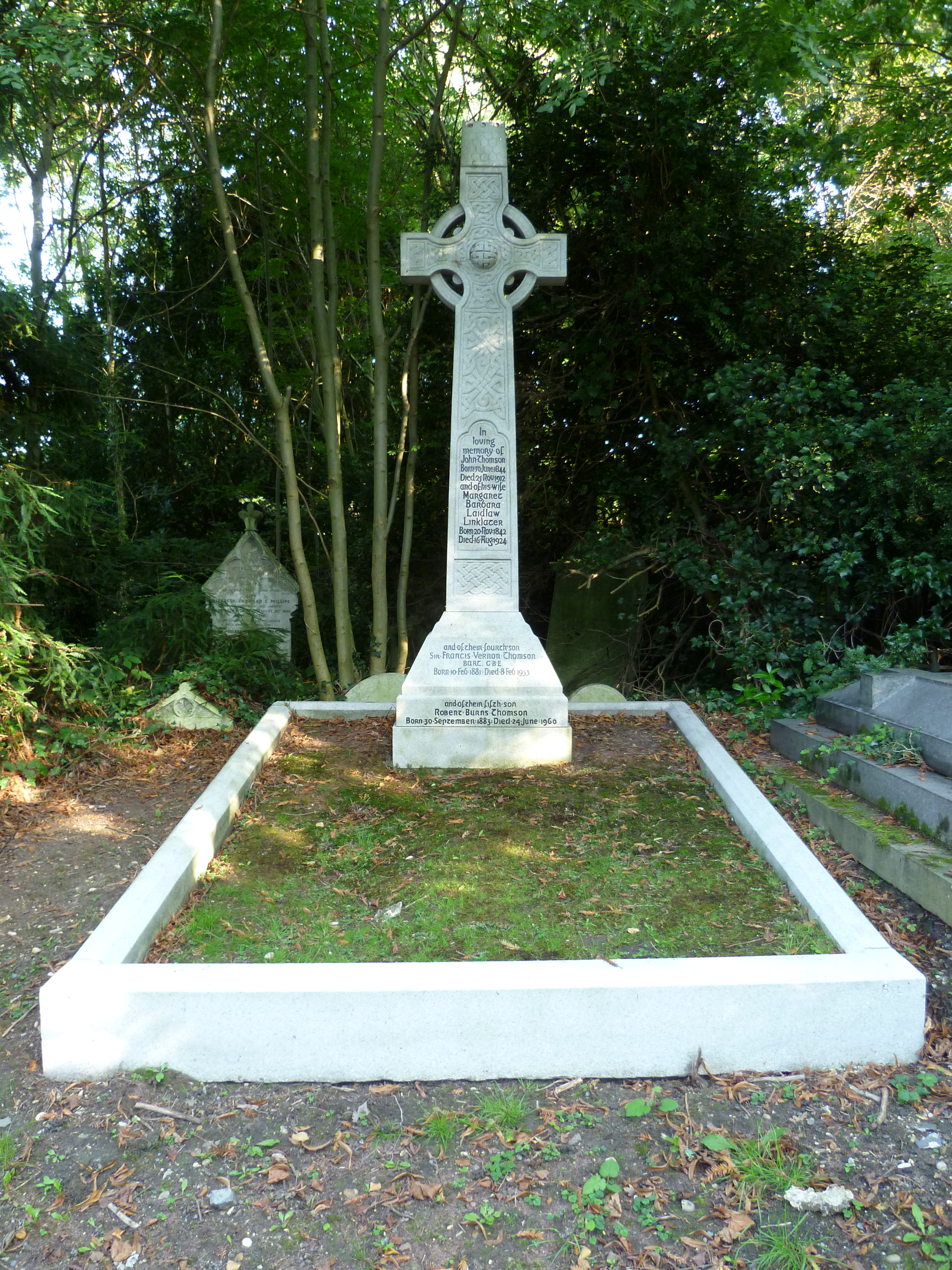
The Thomson family grave at City of Westminster Cemetery, Hanwell.

Sir Francis Vernon Thomson, 1st Baronet, GBE (10 February 1881 - 8 February 1953) was the first and last Baronet of Monken Hadley, Hertfordshire. The title was created in 1938.

He was appointed as the chairman and managing director of the Union-Castle Line after the end of the First World War. During World War II he was appointed as principal shipping advisor and controller of commercial shipping at the MoWT. After the war he returned to his old rôle at Union-Castle.

He was a strict Methodist, a teetotaller and non-smoker and a lifelong bachelor.

Baronetage of the United Kingdom
New creation	Baronet (of Monken Hadley); 1938–1953	Extinct
