= Priscilla Buchan, Baroness Tweedsmuir of Belhelvie =

British politician

The Right Honourable The Baroness Tweedsmuir of Belhelvie PC

Minister of State for Foreign and Commonwealth Affairs
- In office 7 April 1972 – 4 March 1974
- Prime Minister: Edward Heath
- Preceded by: Richard Wood
- Succeeded by: Julian Amery

Minister of State for Scotland
- In office 23 June 1970 – 7 April 1972
- Prime Minister: Edward Heath
- Preceded by: The Lord Hughes
- Succeeded by: The Lord Polwarth

Parliamentary Under-Secretary of State for Scotland
- In office 3 December 1962 – 16 October 1964
- Prime Minister: Harold Macmillan; Alec Douglas-Home
- Preceded by: Tam Galbraith
- Succeeded by: The Lord Hughes

Member of the House of Lords Lord Temporal
- In office 1 July 1970 – 11 March 1978; Life peerage

Member of Parliament for Aberdeen South
- In office 26 November 1946 – 10 March 1966
- Preceded by: Sir Douglas Thomson, Bt
- Succeeded by: Donald Dewar

Personal details
- Born: Priscilla Thomson; 25 January 1915
- Died: 11 March 1978 (aged 63) Aberdeenshire, Scotland
- Party: Scottish Conservative Party
- Other political affiliations: Unionist Party (until 1965)
- Spouses: Maj. Sir Arthur Lindsay Grant (m. 1934; died 1944) The Lord Tweedsmuir (m. 1948)

Priscilla Jean Fortescue Buchan, Baroness Tweedsmuir of Belhelvie, Baroness Tweedsmuir PC (née Thomson, 25 January 1915 – 11 March 1978) was a Scottish politician.

== Early life ==
The daughter of Brigadier Alan F. Thomson DSO, she married Major Sir Arthur Lindsay Grant, 11th Baronet, Grenadier Guards, in 1934. He was killed in action in 1944. She subsequently married author and politician the 2nd Baron Tweedsmuir in 1948. She commanded a Red Cross detachment during World War II.

== House of Commons ==
Lady Tweedsmuir was an unsuccessful parliamentary candidate for Aberdeen North in July 1945, and was elected for Aberdeen South in 1946, holding the seat until 1966. She consistently polled at least 50% of the vote with the exception of her defeat in 1966, a feat never achieved by any succeeding candidates in the constituency.

She was a delegate to the Council of Europe from 1950 to 1953, a UK Delegate to the General Assembly of the United Nations, 1960–1961; Joint Parliamentary Under-Secretary of State for Scotland from 1962 to 1964.

She served as a Governor of the British Film Institute and a member of the general advisory council of the BBC.

== House of Lords ==
On 1 July 1970 she was created a life peer as Baroness Tweedsmuir of Belhelvie, of Potterton in the County of Aberdeen.

Tweedsmuir was Minister of State at the Scottish Office from 1970 to 1972 and at the Foreign and Commonwealth Office from 1972 to 1974 and was sworn of the Privy Council in 1974. In the House of Lords she served as Principal Deputy Chairman of Committees, 1974–1977, and as Chairman of the Select Committee on European Communities, 1974–1977. She was also a Deputy Speaker.

She died of cancer in 1978, aged 63.

== Legacy ==
She was mentioned several times in the 2014 Loyal Address to Parliament on 4 June in the House of Commons by Penny Mordaunt.

In 1983, the veteran Labour politician Emanuel Shinwell stated Tweedsmuir was 'the best' female MP Britain had had.

== Titles ==
- 1915-1934: Miss Priscilla Thomson
- 1934-1935: Mrs Arthur Grant
- 1935-1948: Lady Grant
- 1948-1970: The Right Honourable The Lady Tweedsmuir
- 1970-1978: The Right Honourable The Baroness Tweedsmuir of Belhelvie

Parliament of the United Kingdom
Preceded by Sir Douglas Thomson	Member of Parliament for Aberdeen South; 1946–1966	Succeeded by Donald Dewar
