= Frank Field, Baron Field of Birkenhead =

British politician (1942–2024)

The Right Honourable The Lord Field of Birkenhead CH PC DL
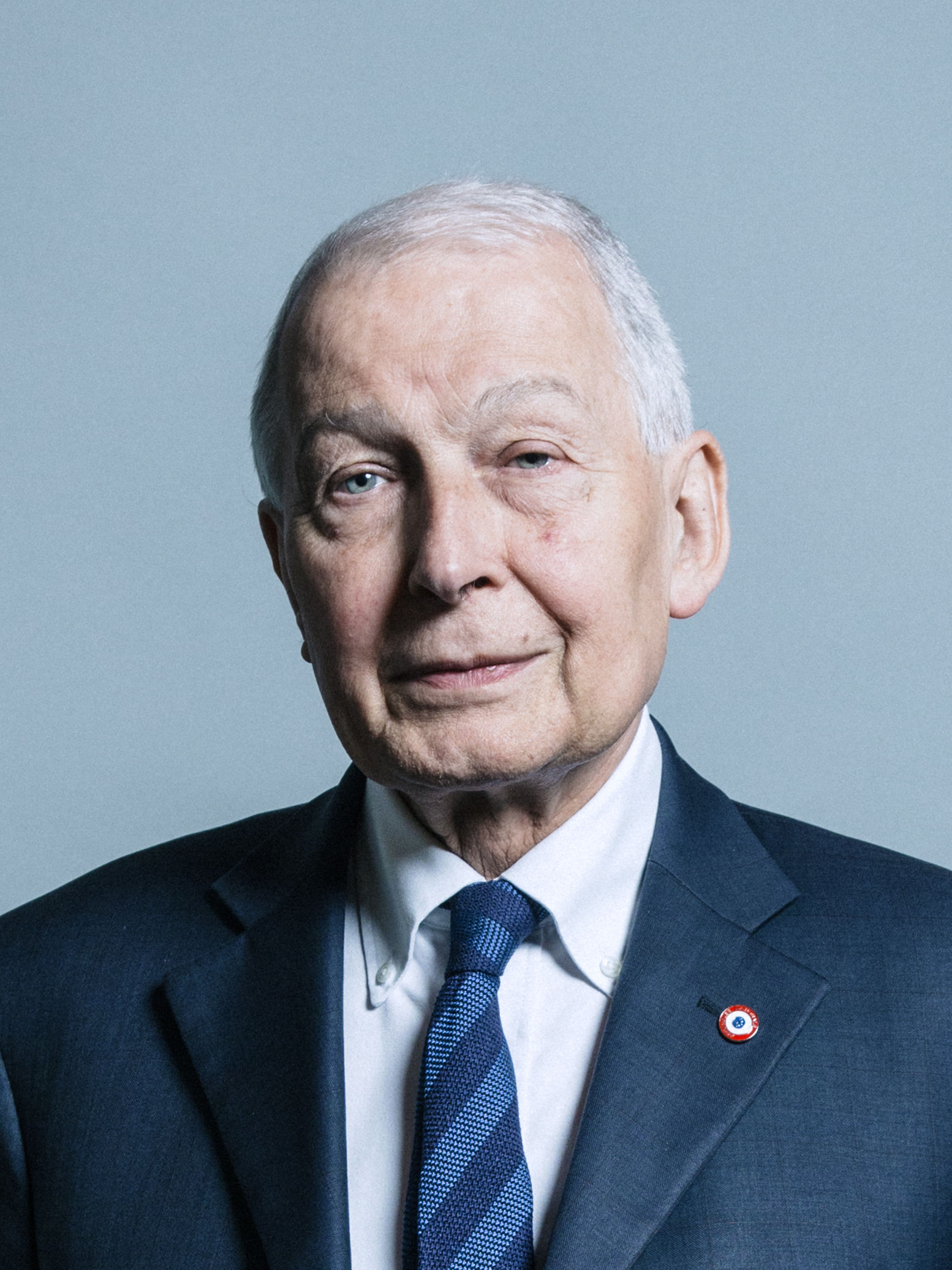
- Official portrait, 2017

Chair of the Work and Pensions Select Committee
- In office 18 June 2015 – 6 November 2019
- Preceded by: Anne Begg
- Succeeded by: Stephen Timms

Minister for Welfare Reform
- In office 2 May 1997 – 27 July 1998
- Prime Minister: Tony Blair
- Preceded by: Peter Lilley
- Succeeded by: John Denham

Member of the House of Lords
- Lord Temporal
- Life peerage 11 September 2020 – 23 April 2024

Member of Parliament for Birkenhead
- In office 3 May 1979 – 6 November 2019
- Preceded by: Edmund Dell
- Succeeded by: Mick Whitley

Member of Hounslow Council for Turnham Green
- In office 7 May 1964 – 9 May 1968

Personal details
- Born: Frank Ernest Field; 16 July 1942 Edmonton, Middlesex, England
- Died: 23 April 2024 (aged 81) London, England
- Party: Crossbench
- Other political affiliations: Non-affiliated (2020); Birkenhead Social Justice Party (2019); Independent (2018–2019); Labour (1960–2018); Conservative (before 1960)
- Education: University of Hull
- Website: Official website

Frank Ernest Field, Baron Field of Birkenhead, CH, PC, DL (16 July 1942 – 23 April 2024) was a British politician who served as Member of Parliament (MP) for Birkenhead for 40 years, from 1979 to 2019, serving as a Labour MP until 2018 and thereafter sitting as an independent. In 2019, he formed the Birkenhead Social Justice Party and stood unsuccessfully as its sole candidate in the 2019 election. After leaving the House of Commons, he was awarded a life peerage in 2020 and sat in the House of Lords as a crossbencher.

From 1997 to 1998, Field served as Minister of Welfare Reform in Tony Blair's first government. Field resigned following differences with Blair; as a backbencher, he soon became one of the Labour government's most vocal critics.

Field was elected chair of the Work and Pensions Select Committee in 2015, and was re-elected unopposed following the 2017 general election.

In 2018, Field resigned the Labour whip citing antisemitism in the party, as well as a "culture of intolerance, nastiness and intimidation" in parts of the party, including in his own constituency. Field lost a confidence vote in his constituency party a month before his resignation, after siding with the government in Brexit votes. His resignation of the whip also led to his departure from the wider membership of the Labour Party, according to the National Executive Committee of the Labour Party, although Field disputed this.

== Early life ==
Field was born in Edmonton, Middlesex, on 16 July 1942, the second of three sons. His father was a labourer at the Morgan Crucible Company's factory in Battersea and his mother a primary school welfare worker at Belmont Primary School in Chiswick. His parents were Conservatives "who believed in character and pulling oneself up by one's own bootstraps".

Field was educated at St Clement Danes Grammar School, at that time in Hammersmith, before studying Economics at the University of Hull. In his youth he was a member of the Conservative Party, but left in 1960 because of his opposition to apartheid in South Africa and joined the Labour Party. In 1964, he became a further education teacher in Southwark and Hammersmith.

Field served as a Labour councillor for Turnham Green on Hounslow London Borough Council from 1964 until 1968, when he lost his seat. He was Director of the Child Poverty Action Group from 1969 to 1979, employing Virginia Bottomley (now Baroness Bottomley of Nettlestone) on long-term research into income and expenditure for families below the poverty line, and the Low Pay Unit from 1974 to 1980.

== Political career ==
Field unsuccessfully contested the constituency of South Buckinghamshire at the 1966 general election, where he was defeated by the sitting Conservative MP Ronald Bell. He was selected to contest the safe Labour seat of Birkenhead at the 1979 general election on the retirement of the sitting MP Edmund Dell. Field held the seat with a majority of 5,909 and remained the constituency's MP until November 2019.

In Parliament, Field was made a member of the Opposition frontbench by the Labour leader Michael Foot as a spokesman on Education in 1980, but was dropped a year later. Following the appointment of Neil Kinnock as the Labour leader in 1983, Field was appointed as a spokesman on Health and Social Security for a year. He was appointed the chairman of the Social Services Select Committee in 1987, becoming the chairman of the new Social Security Select Committee in 1990, a position he held until the 1997 election.

Two nights before the Conservative leadership election in November 1990, he visited Prime Minister Margaret Thatcher at 10 Downing Street. He advised her that her time as prime minister was drawing to a close and that she should back John Major to take over the role. His reason for doing so was that he felt her Conservative colleagues would not tell her straight that she could not win a leadership contest. Following this meeting, he was smuggled out of Downing Street's back door. Two days later Thatcher supported John Major for the post and Major became prime minister.

=== Minister for Welfare Reform ===
Following the 1997 election, with Labour now in power, Field joined the government led by Tony Blair as its Minister for Welfare Reform, working in the Department of Social Security (DSS). Blair has said Field's mission was to "think the unthinkable".

Field thought that the state should play only a small direct role in the provision of welfare and he disliked means-testing and non-contributory entitlement to benefits, which he believed should only be received after claimants had joined Continental-style social insurance schemes or mutual organisations such as friendly societies. There were clashes with the Chancellor of the Exchequer, Gordon Brown, and the Secretary of State for Social Security, Harriet Harman – the Treasury was concerned about costs, while Brown himself was in favour of the poor being entitled to working-age benefits without having first paid National Insurance contributions, later established as the Working Families Tax Credit. According to The Guardian, Field resigned his ministerial position in July 1998 rather than accept a move away from the DSS as part of a wider reshuffle; the newspaper suggested at the time that Blair had been "disappointed" by Field's ideas for welfare reform. Harriet Harman also returned to the backbenches. In his autobiography, Blair wrote about Field:

The problem was not so much that his thoughts were unthinkable as unfathomable.

The following year, Downing Street briefed the press that "harsh and authoritarian" measures were in store for welfare recipients and plans were made to abolish the DSS.

At the end of Blair's second term of office, the BBC reviewed his record on welfare reform up to that point:

Thinking the unthinkable on the welfare state has been one of the New Labour mantras since before the party was elected in 1997. So it has been a disappointment [...] that, eight years later, the thinking has still to produce any concrete results.

The welfare reform most closely associated with Blair was not introduced for a further three years: the replacement of Incapacity Benefit (IB) by Employment and Support Allowance (ESA). The think-tank Reform, on whose advisory board Field used to sit, said in its 2016 report on changes to out-of-work sickness benefits that ESA had "replicated many of the problems of IB" and had therefore "failed to achieve its objective".

=== Return to the backbenches ===
After leaving ministerial office, Field continued with his duties as an MP and joined the Ecclesiastical and the Public Accounts Select Committees in the House of Commons.

From the backbenches, he was a vocal critic of the government, criticising in 1999 the new Working Families Tax Credit as an approach which could not survive in the long term, and voting against foundation hospitals in November 2003. In May 2008, he was a significant critic of the abolition of the 10p tax rate and this led to Field describing Prime Minister Gordon Brown as "unhappy inside his own body". He later apologised in parliament for the personal attack. In June 2008, Field joined calls for the establishment of a devolved parliament for England.

On 8 June 2009, Field wrote in his blog that he believed that the Labour Party would not win the next election with Gordon Brown as leader. On 6 January 2010, Field was one of the few Labour MPs to back Geoff Hoon and Patricia Hewitt's calls for a secret ballot of the Parliamentary Labour Party on the leadership of Gordon Brown. The ballot could have led to a leadership contest.

In May 2009, Field announced his candidature for Speaker of the House of Commons, but later withdrew his candidature, citing lack of support from within his own party. John Bercow was elected as the new Speaker.

In the 2010 general election Field retained his Birkenhead seat with an increased majority. In June 2010 he was appointed by David Cameron's coalition government to head an independent review into poverty, which proposed adopting a new measure centred around life-chance indicators and increasing funding for early years education. In an interview in September 2012, Field considered the government to have ignored his report, saying "nothing had been done about it" and that it was "very disappointing".

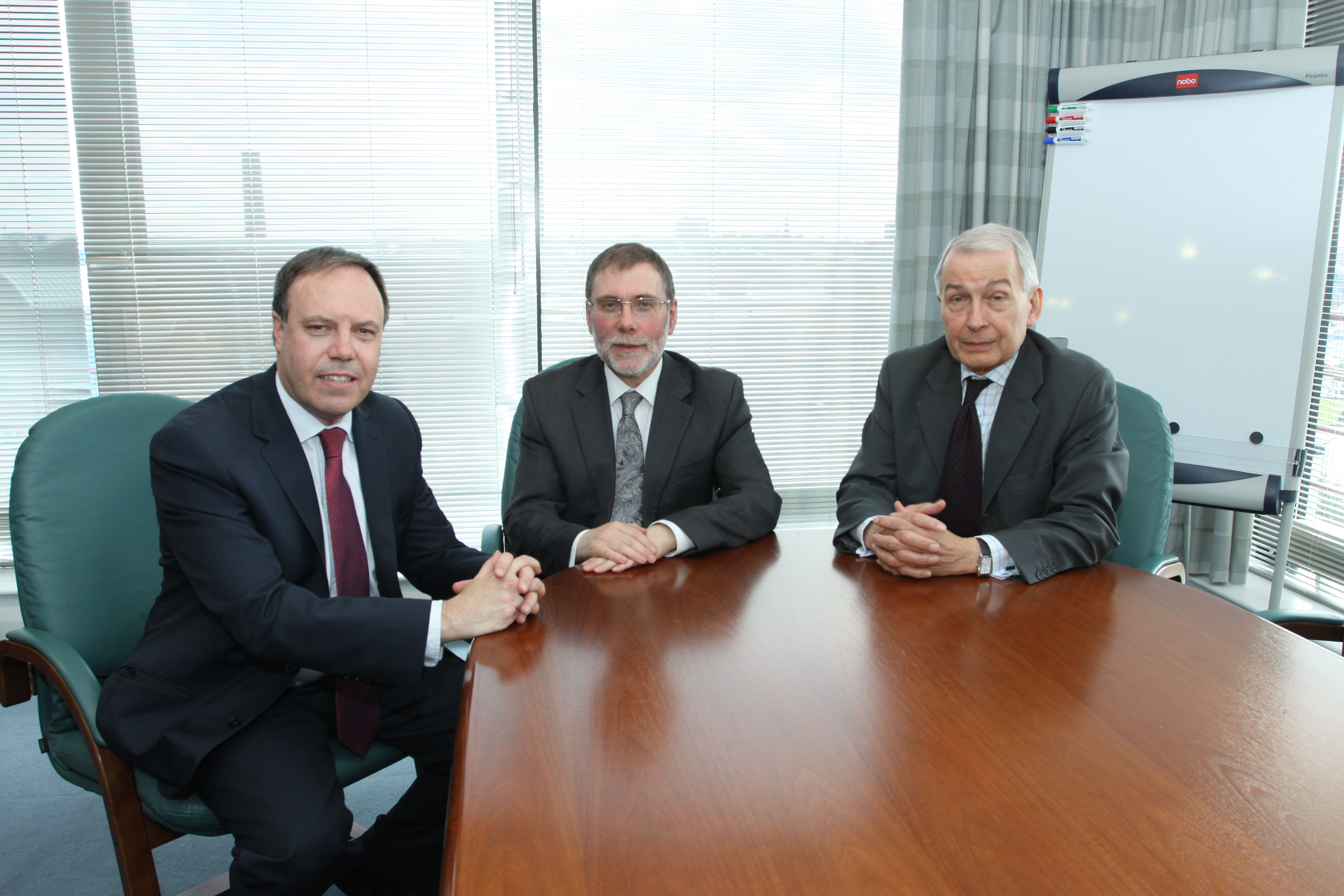
Nigel Dodds, Nelson McCausland and Frank Field (from left to right) pictured in 2012

In October 2013, along with Laura Sandys, Field established the All-Party Parliamentary Group (APPG) on Hunger and Food Poverty, which he went on to chair. He also chaired a parliamentary inquiry into hunger commissioned by the APPG which reported in December 2014. Field became the chair of trustees of Feeding Britain, a charitable organisation set up in October 2015 to implement the recommendations made by the APPG.

Following the 2015 general election, it was announced in June 2015 that he had been elected to the chairmanship of the Work and Pensions Select Committee. He was re-elected unopposed to the role following the 2017 general election.

Field nominated Jeremy Corbyn as a candidate in the Labour leadership election of 2015, stating that while he did not think Corbyn could win a general election, he hoped his candidature would force the party to confront its 'deficit denial'.

In June 2016, Field wrote in The Guardian that he supported Brexit, emphasising the need to control immigration due to it creating excessive demands on public services, roads and housing stock. He argued the EU model suited big businesses who wanted cheap labour, and supported agricultural interests creating high prices for food, rather than families. The Liverpool Echo reported that Field was "a long-time Brexiteer".

In December 2017, during a debate on Universal Credit, Field described the impact that Universal Credit changes had had on his constituents. His observations moved Work and Pensions Select Committee member Heidi Allen to tears. Field spoke of how he had talked a man out of suicide and how one claimant felt "lucky" his family was invited to eat food leftovers from a funeral.

=== Resignation of the Labour whip ===
On 17 July 2018, a vote was held on a rebel amendment to a trade bill, which aimed to force the British government to join a customs union with the EU in the event of a no-deal Brexit. Field, Kate Hoey, John Mann and Graham Stringer were the only Labour MPs to oppose the amendment, which was lost by 307 votes to 301. Field lost a confidence vote in his constituency, after siding with the government in these Brexit votes. On 30 August 2018, Field resigned the Labour whip because, he said, Labour was "increasingly seen as a racist party" and due to the "culture of intolerance, nastiness and intimidation" in parts of the party, including his own constituency. Some commentators suggested that he had "jumped before he was pushed".

Field described himself as an "independent Labour MP". In September 2018, he said he would not trigger a by-election and would remain an MP. On 2 August 2019, he announced that he was forming a new party, the Birkenhead Social Justice Party.

Field voted for Prime Minister Theresa May's Brexit deal in the "meaningful vote" on 15 January 2019, which May lost. Subsequently, Field voted for the Conservative Party-supported Brady amendment calling on the Government to renegotiate the Northern Ireland backstop part of the deal and abstained on the Labour party-supported Cooper-Boles amendment to prevent a no-deal Brexit.

=== Birkenhead Social Justice Party ===
In August 2019, Field stated that he would stand in the next general election as a candidate for a newly-formed Birkenhead Social Justice Party. The party stated that it would stand on a social justice, localist and pro-Brexit platform.

In the December 2019 general election, he was beaten by the Labour Party candidate Mick Whitley, who polled 24,990 votes, compared to Field's 7,285, a winning margin of 17,705 votes. The Party was de-registered with the Electoral Commission on 17 February 2020.

== Awards and honours ==
Field was sworn in as a member of the Privy Council in 1997. This gave him the honorific prefix "The Right Honourable" and, after ennoblement, the post nominal letters "PC" for life.

He was appointed as a deputy lieutenant for the county of Merseyside in October 2011. At the age of 75 he was moved to the retired list. This gave him the Post Nominal Letters "DL" for Life.

In March 2015, Field was awarded the Grassroot Diplomat initiative honour for the co-founding of environmental organisation Cool Earth, a charity that works alongside indigenous villages to halt rainforest destruction as a bottom-up solution to an ageing problem.

Field was awarded an honorary fellowship by Liverpool John Moores University on 12 July 2016.

In 2017, he was awarded the Langton Award for Community Service by the Archbishop of Canterbury "for sustained and outstanding commitment to social welfare". Field was nominated for a life peerage in the 2019 Dissolution Honours. He was created Baron Field of Birkenhead, of Birkenhead in the County of Merseyside, on 11 September 2020.

Field was appointed Member of the Order of the Companions of Honour (CH) in the 2022 New Year Honours for political and public service. Field was awarded the freedom of the Borough of Wirral on 16 February 2022. He was also a Companion of the Guild of St George.

== Personal beliefs ==
Field had a reputation for being an intellectual, a free-thinker and a maverick in the Parliamentary Labour Party. Inspired by his Christianity, he took a socially conservative stance on various issues particularly on the family, antisocial behaviour, immigration and welfare reform. He also embraced calls for an English Parliament and called for a renegotiation of Britain's relationship with European Union, including changes to free movement of labour. He voted for gay marriage and in favour of other gay rights legislation since 1997. He was a member of the advisory board of Reform Research Trust think tank and of the generally conservative but also "broad church" magazine Standpoint. In May 2008, he said that Margaret Thatcher "is certainly a hero" and that "I still see Mrs T from time to time – I always call her 'Mrs T', when I talk to her". He regarded Thatcher as a friend and believed in her self-help market philosophy.

In 1999, based on his belief that Britain should find a sustainable non-political way to fund retirement, Field helped set up the Pension Reform Group, which promotes the Universal Protected Pension as the best means to reform pensions.

Although there were attempts to get him to defect to the Conservatives, they were without success. In 2008, Field was named as the 100th-most-influential right-winger in the United Kingdom by The Daily Telegraph. Field supported the return of national service to tackle growing unemployment and instil "a sense of order and patriotism" in Britain's young men and women. In May 2010, Field endorsed Ed Miliband to become leader of the Labour Party to replace Gordon Brown.

Field believed strongly in fighting climate change. He co-founded the charity Cool Earth with Johan Eliasch. Cool Earth protects endangered rainforest and works with the local communities to combat climate change. Field was the instigator of the idea of a global Commonwealth network of protected forests, though he failed to raise political interest for a number of years; according to Field, when Queen Elizabeth II was told about the idea, she supported it enthusiastically, and the initiative was launched as The Queen's Commonwealth Canopy in 2015.

In 2010 he chaired the Liverpool City Region Poverty and Life Chances Commission to create a new strategy for the Government to abolish child poverty.

Field believed in reducing the time-limit within which women can have an abortion, and in stripping abortion providers such as Marie Stopes of their counselling role and handing it to organisations not linked to abortion clinics. With the Conservative MP Nadine Dorries, he was vocal in two defeated attempts to legislate for such a reform in Parliament. He was a prominent Eurosceptic within the Labour Party and declared on 20 February 2016 that he would campaign to leave the EU. In January 2019, the supporters page of the Labour Leave website listed only two MPs, Labour's Kate Hoey and Field.

== Personal life ==
Field was an active member of the Church of England, a former chairman of the Churches Conservation Trust and a member of the Church of England General Synod. In 1983, while a member of General Synod, Frank responded to the plight of a number of divorced clergy wives and helped them found Broken Rites, a self help organisation that supports separated and divorced clergy spouses and civil partners and also lobbies for fair treatment for them. [www.brokenrites.org] Field's political and religious views were most clearly expressed in his book Neighbours From Hell where he discusses what might replace the "largely beneficial effect" of evangelical Christianity. Between 2005 and 2015, Field was chairman of the Cathedral Fabrics Commission for England – the national body that controls the care, conservation and repair or development of cathedrals. In 2007 he was appointed chairman of the 2011 King James Bible Trust, which was established to celebrate the 400th anniversary of the King James Bible.

Field was also a Vice President of the National Churches Trust.

In a 2006 article in The Observer, the critic Jay Rayner noted that Field's unmarried status had led him to describe himself as "incomplete" but that those in his social circle suggested he enjoyed "a full life outside politics". From 1979 he lived in a postwar block half a mile from the House of Commons. In February 2023, his book Politics, Poverty and Belief was published, co-written with Brian Griffiths, Thatcher's former chief policy adviser, and Rachel Griffiths.

=== Illness and death ===
Field was admitted to hospital after collapsing during a meeting in March 2015.

On 22 October 2021, Field announced that he was terminally ill and had spent time in a hospice. Baroness Meacher read out a statement from him in the House of Lords during a debate on the Assisted Dying Bill, which he supported.

In a January 2023 interview with The Guardian, Field revealed he had been suffering from prostate cancer for ten years and it had spread to his jaw. He remarked: "It's a strange experience taking so long to die."

Field died at a care home in London, on 23 April 2024, at the age of 81.

== Publications ==
- Twentieth Century State Education: Readings for General Studies by Frank Field and Patricia Haikin, 1971, Oxford University Press, ISBN 0-19-913006-X
- Black Britons: Readings for General Studies by Frank Field and Patricia Haikin, 1971, Oxford University Press, ISBN 0-19-913007-8
- One Nation: The Conservatives Record since 1970 by Frank Field, 1972, Child Poverty Action Group, ISBN B0000E9CMI
- Abuse and the Abused by Frank Field, 1972, Child Poverty Action Group, ISBN 0-9500051-3-4
- Low Pay by Frank Field, 1973, Arrow Books, ISBN 0-09-908240-3
- Incomes Policy for Families by Frank Field, Child Poverty Action Group, ISBN 0-903963-07-8
- Unequal Britain by Frank Field, 1974, Arrow Books, ISBN 0-09-909820-2
- Housing and Poverty by Frank Field, 1974, Catholic Housing Aid Society, ISBN 0-903113-07-4
- Poor Families and Inflation by Michael Brown and Frank Field, 1974, Child Poverty Action Group, ISBN 0-903963-12-4
- The Stigma of Free School Meals: Welfare in Action by Frank Field, 1974, Child Poverty Action Group, ISBN 0-903963-23-X
- Low Wages Councils by Frank Field and Steve Winyard, 1975, Spokesman Books, ISBN 0-85124-118-2
- Social Contract for Families: Memorandum to the Chancellor of the Exchequer by Frank Field and Peter Townsend, 1975, Child Poverty Action Group, ISBN 0-903963-21-3
- Unemployment: The Facts by Frank Field, 1975, Child Poverty Action Group, ISBN 0-903963-22-1
- Poverty: The Facts by Frank Field, 1975, Child Poverty Action Group, ISBN 0-903963-24-8
- Back to the Thirties for the Poor?: A Report on the Living Standards of the Poor in 1975 by Frank Field, 1975, Child Poverty Action Group, ISBN 0-903963-27-2
- Education and the Urban Crisis Edited by Frank Field, 1976, Routledge, ISBN 0-7100-8536-2
- To Him who Hath by Frank Field, 1976, Penguin Books Ltd, ISBN 0-14-021976-5
- The new Corporate Interest by Frank Field, 1976, Child Poverty Action Group, ISBN 0-903963-28-0
- Conscript Army: Study of Britain's Unemployed by Frank Field, 1977, Routledge, ISBN 0-7100-8779-9
- Are Low Wages Inevitable? by Frank Field, 1977, Spokesman Books, ISBN 0-85124-165-4
- Wasted Labour: Call for Action on Unemployment by Frank Field, 1978, Child Poverty Action Group, ISBN 0-903963-58-2
- Rising Tide of Poverty: A Challenge for Political Parties by Frank Field, 1978, Low Pay Unit, ISBN B0000EDRIP
- The Wealth Report by Frank Field, 1979, Routledge, ISBN 0-7100-0164-9
- Fair Shares for Families: Need for a Family Impact Statement by Frank Field, 1980, Study Commission on the Family, ISBN 0-907051-02-2
- Inequality in Britain: Freedom, Welfare and the State by Frank Field, 1981, Fontana, ISBN 0-00-635759-8
- Poverty and Politics by Frank Field, 1982, Heinemann Education, ISBN 0-435-82306-X
- The Wealth Report 2 by Frank Field, 1983, Routledge, ISBN 0-7100-9452-3
- Policies Against Low Pay by Frank Field, 1984, Policy Studies Institute
- The Minimum Wage by Frank Field, 1984, Ashgate, ISBN 0-435-83300-6
- What Price a Child?: A Historical Review of the Relative Costs of Dependants by Frank Field, 1985, Policy Studies Institute, ISBN 0-85374-251-0
- Freedom and Wealth in a Socialist Future by Frank Field, 1987, Constable, ISBN 0-09-467380-2
- The Politics of Paradise: A Christian Approach to the Kingdom by Frank Field, 1987, Fount, ISBN 0-00-627114-6
- Losing Out: Emergence of Britain's Underclass by Frank Field, 1989, Blackwell Publishers, ISBN 0-631-17149-5
- An Agenda for Britain by Frank Field, 1993, Harper Collins, ISBN 0-00-638226-6
- Making Sense of Pensions by Matthew Owen and Frank Field, 1993, Fabian Society, ISBN 0-7163-0557-7
- Private Pensions for All by Frank Field and Matthew Owen, 1993, Fabian Society, ISBN 0-7163-3016-4
- Europe Isn't Working by Frank Field, 1994, Institute of Community Studies, ISBN 0-9523355-0-6
- Beyond Punishment by Frank Field and Matthew Owen, 1994, Institute of Community Studies
- National Pensions Savings Plan by Frank Field and Matthew Owen, 1994, Fabian Society, ISBN 0-7163-4018-6
- Making Welfare Work: Reconstructing Welfare for the Millennium by Frank Field, 1995, Institute of Community Studies, ISBN 0-9523355-2-2
- The Measurement of Poverty and Low Income at the Millennium by Frank Field, 1995, Manchester Statistical Society, ISBN 0-85336-130-4
- Who Gets What, How and for How Long? by Frank Field and Paul Gregg, Fabian Society, ISBN 0-7163-4021-6
- How to Pay for the Future by Frank Field, 1996
- The Operation of the Child Support Agency by Frank Field, 1996, The Stationery Office Books, ISBN 0-10-207596-4
- Reflections of Welfare (Discussion Paper) by Frank Field, 1998, The Social Market Foundation, ISBN 1-874097-32-1
- Stakeholder Welfare by Frank Field, Alan Deacon, Pete Alcock, David G. Green, Melanie Phillips, 2000, Civitas ISBN 1-903386-93-4
- The State of Dependency: Welfare Under Labour by Frank Field, 2000, The Social Market Foundation, ISBN 1-874097-52-6
- Capitalism, Morality and Markets by Brian Griffiths, Robert A Siciro, Norman Berry and Frank Field, 2001, Institute of Economic Affairs ISBN 0-255-36496-2
- William Temple: A Calling to Prophecy by Stephen Spencer and foreword by Frank Field, 2001, Society for Promoting Christian Knowledge, ISBN 0-281-05437-1
- Debating Pensions: Self-Interest, Citizenship and the Common Good by Frank Field and Alan Deacon, 2002, Civitas ISBN 1-903386-24-1
- Welfare Titans by Frank Field, 2002, Civitas, ISBN 1-903386-20-9
- Neighbours from Hell: The Politics of Behaviour by Frank Field, 2003, Politico's Publishing, ISBN 1-84275-078-X
- Working Welfare: Contributory Benefits, the Moral Economy and the New Politics by Frank Field, 2013, Politeia, ISBN 978-09926340-1-8

Parliament of the United Kingdom
Preceded by Edmund Dell	Member of Parliament for Birkenhead; 1979–2019	Succeeded by Mick Whitley
