= Thomson baronets =

Baronetcy in the Baronetage of the United Kingdom

There have been four baronetcies created for persons with the surname Thomson (see also Thompson baronets), one in the Baronetage of Nova Scotia and three in the Baronetage of the United Kingdom.

The Thomson Baronetcy, of Duddingston in Edinburgh, was created in the Baronetage of Nova Scotia on 20 February 1636 for Thomas Thomson. The title became dormant on the death of the third Baronet in 1691.

The Thomson Baronetcy, of Old Nunthorpe in the County of York, was created in the Baronetage of the United Kingdom on 3 July 1925 for Wilfrid Thomson. He was a partner in the firm of Beckett & Co, bankers, of York. Thomson was the eldest son of the Most Reverend William Thomson, Archbishop of York from 1862 to 1890. As of 2007 the title is held by the first Baronet's grandson, the third Baronet, who succeeded his father in 1991.

The Thomson Baronetcy, of Glendarroch in the County of Midlothian, was created in the Baronetage of the United Kingdom on 28 March 1929 for the Scottish politician and lawyer Frederick Charles Thomson.

The Thomson Baronetcy, of Monken Hadley in the County of Hertford, was created in the Baronetage of the United Kingdom on 15 February 1938 for Francis Vernon Thomson. The title became extinct on his death in 1953.

== Thomson baronets, of Duddingston (1636) ==
- Sir Thomas Thomson, 1st Baronet (died by 1666)
- Sir Patrick Thomson, 2nd Baronet (1637–c. 1674)
- Sir James Thomson, 3rd Baronet (died 1691)

== Thomson baronets, of Old Nunthorpe (1925) ==
- Sir Wilfrid Forbes Home Thomson, 1st Baronet (1858–1939)
- Sir Ivo Wilfrid Home Thomson, 2nd Baronet (1902–1991)
- Sir Mark Wilfrid Home Thomson, 3rd Baronet (born 1939)

The heir apparent is the present holder's son Albert Mark Home Thomson (born 1979).

== Thomson baronets, of Glendarroch (1929) ==
- Sir Frederick Charles Thomson, 1st Baronet (1875–1935)
- Sir (James) Douglas Wishart Thomson, 2nd Baronet (1905–1972)
- Sir (Frederick Douglas) David Thomson, 3rd Baronet (born 1940)

The heir apparent is the present holder's son Simon Douglas Charles Thomson (born 1969).

== Thomson baronets, of Monken Hadley (1938) ==
- Sir Francis Vernon Thomson, 1st Baronet (1881–1953)

== See also ==
- Thompson Baronets
