= 1946 Aberdeen South by-election =

British parliamentary by-election

The 1946 Aberdeen South by-election was held on 26 November 1946. The by-election was held due to the resignation of the incumbent Conservative MP, Sir Douglas Thomson. It was won by the Conservative candidate Priscilla Buchan.

Aberdeen South by-election, 1946
Party	Candidate	Votes	%	±%
Unionist	Priscilla Buchan	21,750	54.84	+8.11
Labour	Arthur Irvine	17,911	45.16	+2.84
Majority		3,839	9.68	+5.26
Turnout		39,661		
Unionist hold		Swing	+5.4	
