= Sir Douglas Thomson, 2nd Baronet =

British politician (1905–1972)

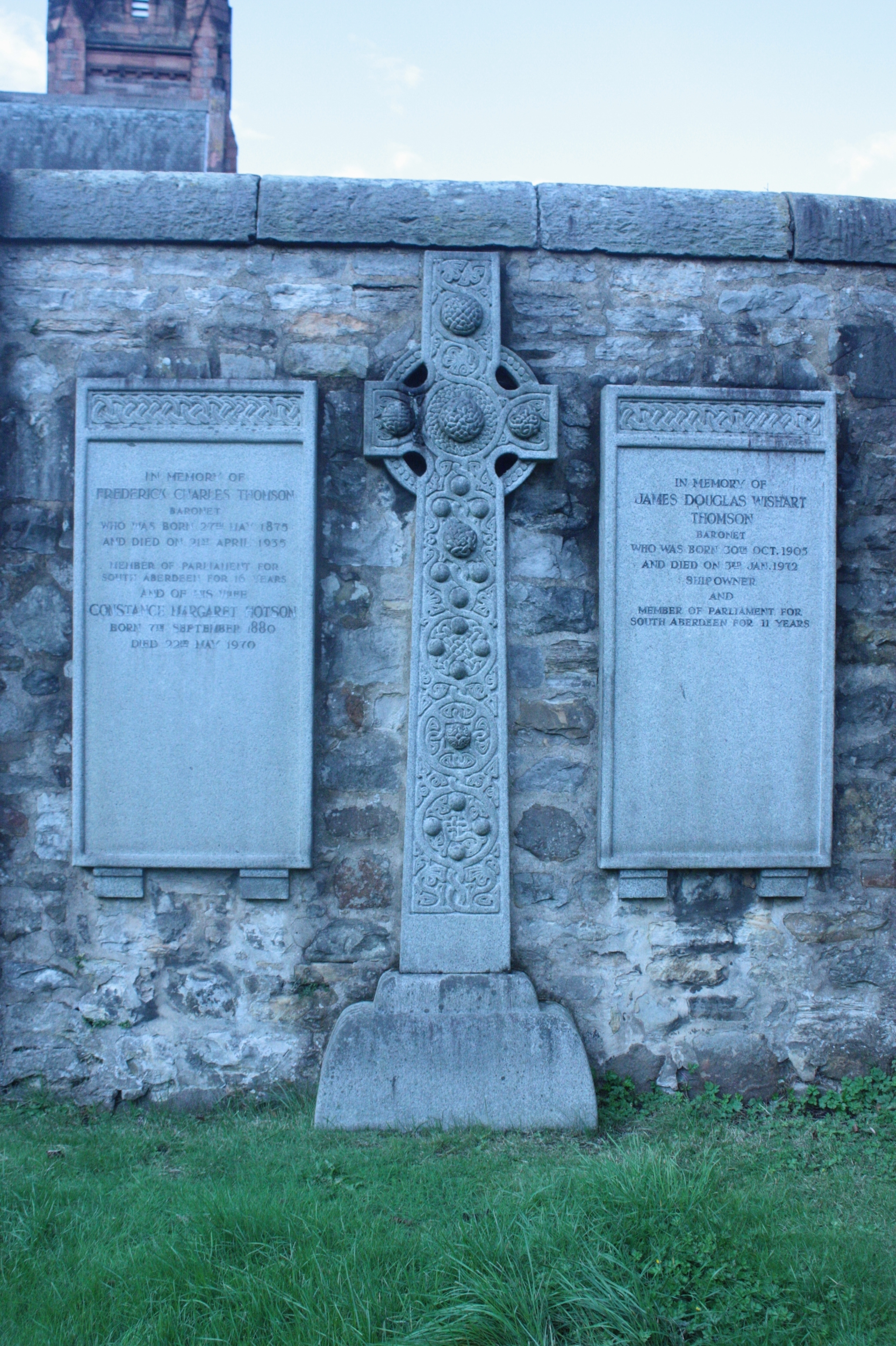
Sir Frederick Charles Thomson grave, Dean Cemetery

Sir James Douglas Wishart Thomson, 2nd Baronet (30 October 1905 – 3 January 1972) was a Scottish Unionist politician.

Thomson was the son of Sir Frederick Thomson, 1st Baronet and was educated at Oxford University. He was a member of the Oxford crews in the 1926 and 1927 Boat Race.

Thomson was elected as member of parliament (MP) for Aberdeen South at a by-election in May 1935 following the death of his father, who had held the seat for the Conservative party and from whom he also inherited the baronetcy. He held the seat until he "resigned" on 4 November 1946 by taking the Chiltern Hundreds.

He is buried with his parents in the north-east corner of Dean Cemetery in Edinburgh.

== See also ==
- List of Oxford University Boat Race crews

Parliament of the United Kingdom
Preceded by Sir Frederick Thomson	Member of Parliament for Aberdeen South; 1935–1946	Succeeded by Lady Tweedsmuir
Baronetage of the United Kingdom
Preceded by Frederick Thomson	Baronet (of Glendarroch); 1935–1972	Succeeded by David Thomson
