= George Esslemont =

George Birnie Esslemont (1860 – 2 October 1917) was a Scottish Liberal politician. He was elected as Member of Parliament for Aberdeen South in 1907, and held the seat until he resigned in 1917.

He married Clementine Macdonald who became President of the Aberdeen Women's Liberal Association. Their daughter was Mary Esslemont who became a leading doctor and was born in Aberdeen in 1891.

Parliament of the United Kingdom
Preceded by James Bryce	Member of Parliament for Aberdeen South; 1907–1917	Succeeded by John Fleming
