= Sir Frederick Thomson, 1st Baronet =

Scottish politician

Sir Frederick Charles Thomson Bt KC
- Born: 27 May 1875; Edinburgh, Scotland
- Died: 21 April 1935 (aged 59); Dunbar, Scotland
- Military career
- Allegiance: United Kingdom
- Branch: British Army
- Units: Scottish Horse; Lovat Scouts
- Conflicts: Egypt; Salonika
- Other work: Scottish Unionist Politician; Barrister

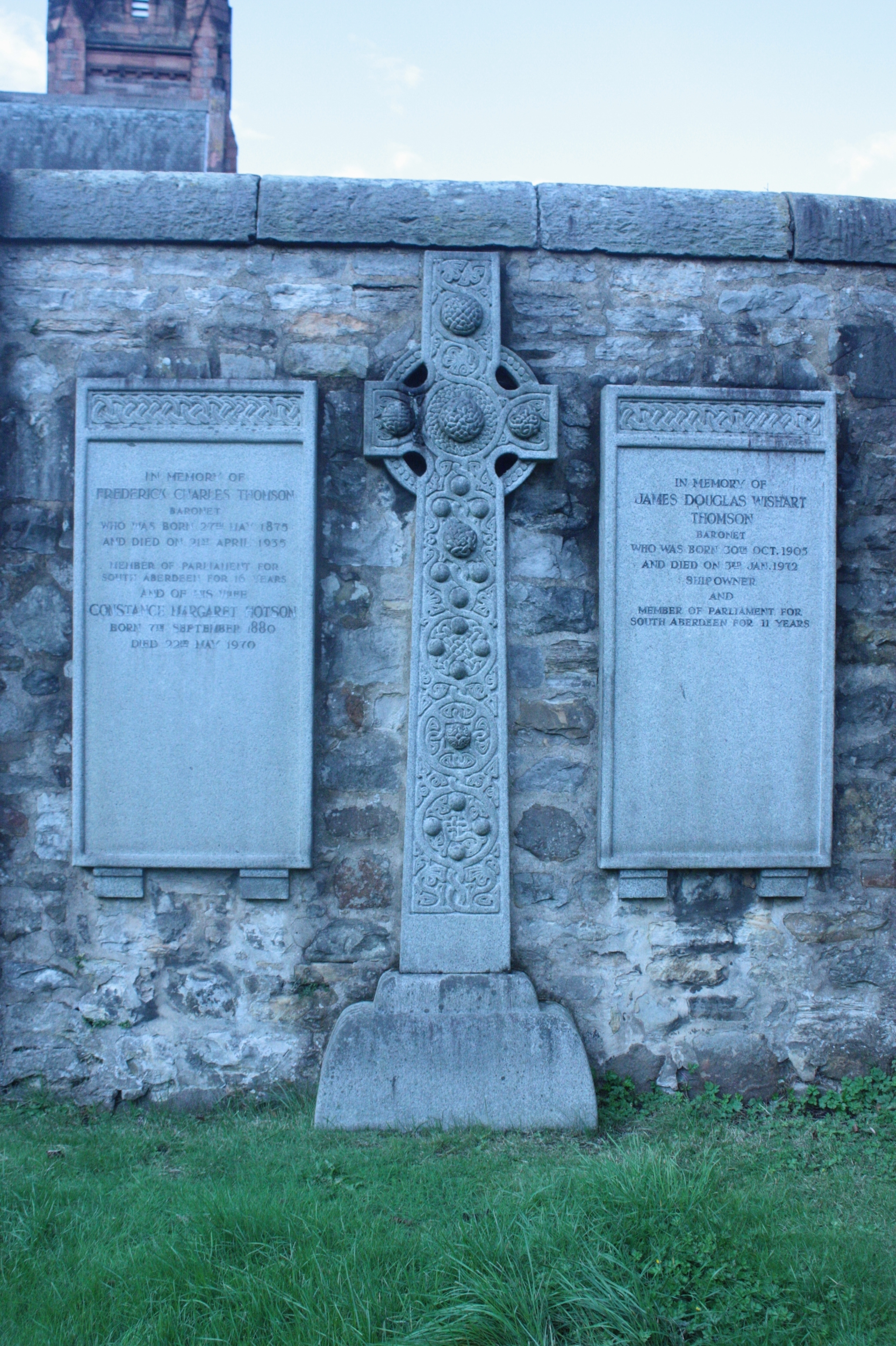
Sir Frederick Charles Thomson grave, Dean Cemetery

Sir Frederick Charles Thomson, 1st Baronet, KC (27 May 1875 – 21 April 1935) was a Scottish Unionist politician and lawyer.

== Life ==
He was the third son of James Wishart Thomson of Glenpark, Balerno, Midlothian; James was a son of William Thomson, co-founder of the Ben Line.

Educated at Edinburgh Academy, University College, Oxford and at the University of Edinburgh, he was called to the Scottish bar in 1901, and to the English bar in 1904.

He served in Egypt as a lieutenant with the Scottish Horse and in Salonika with the Lovat Scouts, where he was severely wounded.

He was Unionist Member of Parliament for Aberdeen South from 1918 until his death.

He was Parliamentary Private Secretary to Sir Robert Horne, 1919–1922, and a Junior Lord of the Treasury from February–April 1923. He was appointed a King's Counsel in 1923 and appointed as Solicitor General for Scotland from April 1923 to 1924. He was again a Junior Lord of the Treasury from 1924 to 1928, Vice-Chamberlain of HM Household, 1928–1929 and September–November 1931, and Treasurer of the Household from 1931 until his death in 1935.

He was created a baronet in 1929, of Glendarroch, in the county of Midlothian. He was succeeded in the baronetcy by his son Douglas, who was elected as MP for Aberdeen South in the May 1935 by-election after his death.

He is buried with his wife Constance Margaret Hotson (1880–1970) and son in the north-east corner of Dean Cemetery in Edinburgh.

== Sources ==
- Thomson Baronets
- Craig, F. W. S. (1983) [1969]. British parliamentary election results 1918–1949 (3rd ed.). Chichester: Parliamentary Research Services. ISBN 0-900178-06-X.
- Leigh Rayment's list of baronets

Political offices
Preceded by Sir George Hennessy, Bt	Vice-Chamberlain of the Household; 1928–1929	Succeeded by John Henry Hayes
Preceded by John Henry Hayes	Vice-Chamberlain of the Household; 1931	Succeeded by Sir Frederick Penny
Preceded by Sir George Hennessy, Bt	Treasurer of the Household; 1931–1935	Succeeded by Sir Frederick Penny
Legal offices
Preceded by David Fleming	Solicitor General for Scotland; 1923–1924	Succeeded by John Charles Fenton
Parliament of the United Kingdom
Preceded by John Fleming	Member of Parliament for Aberdeen South; 1918–1935	Succeeded by Sir Douglas Thomson, Bt
Baronetage of the United Kingdom
New creation	Baronet (of Glendarroch, Midlothian); 1929–1935	Succeeded by Douglas Thomson
