= Airyhall/Broomhill/Garthdee =

Council ward in Aberdeen, Scotland

- Aberdeen City Council
- Boundary of Airyhall/Broomhill/Garthdee in Aberdeen from 2017.
- Electorate: 11,842

Current ward
- Created: 2007
- Councillor: Derek Davidson (SNP)
- Councillor: Ian Yuill (Liberal Democrats)
- Councillor: Ryan Houghton (Conservative)

Airyhall/Broomhill/Garthdee is one of the thirteen wards used to elect members of the Aberdeen City Council. It elects three Councillors.

== Councillors ==
Election	Councillors		
2007	Scott Cassie (Liberal Democrats)	Ian Yuill (Liberal Democrats)	Jill Wisely (Conservative)
2011 by-election	Gordon Scott Townson (SNP)	Ian Yuill (Liberal Democrats)	Jill Wisely (Conservative)
2012	Gordon Scott Townson (SNP)	Ian Yuill (Liberal Democrats)	Angela Taylor (Labour)
2017	Gordon Scott Townson (SNP)	Ian Yuill (Liberal Democrats)	Douglas Lumsden (Conservative)
2022	Derek Davidson (SNP)	Ian Yuill (Liberal Democrats)	Ryan Houghton (Conservative)

== Election results ==
=== 2022 election ===
Airyhall/Broomhill/Garthdee – 3 seats
Party	Candidate	FPv%	Count	
Party	Candidate	FPv%	1	2
Liberal Democrats	Ian Yuill (incumbent)	36.5	2,146	
SNP	Derek Davidson	27.5	1,615	
Conservative	Ryan Houghton	21.1	1,240	1,455
Labour	Logan Machell	10.7	627	802
Green	Harry Rafferty	4.2	244	345
Electorate: 11,842 Valid: 5,872 Spoilt: 55 Quota: 1,469 Turnout: 50.1%

=== 2017 election ===
2017 Aberdeen City Council election

Airyhall/Broomhill/Garthdee – 3 seats
Party	Candidate	FPv%	Count	
Party	Candidate	FPv%	1	2
Liberal Democrats	Ian Yuill (incumbent)	40.2	2,458	
Conservative	Douglas Lumsden	25.1	1,533	
SNP	Gordon Townson (incumbent)	23.2	1,417	1,596.7
Labour	Angela Taylor (incumbent)	11.6	708	1,076.8
Electorate: TBC Valid: 6,116 Spoilt: 54 Quota: 1,530 Turnout: 6,170 (51.9%)

=== 2012 election ===
2012 Aberdeen City Council election

Airyhall/Broomhill/Garthdee - 3 seats
Party	Candidate	FPv%	Count			
Party	Candidate	FPv%	1	2	3	4
Liberal Democrats	Ian Yuill (incumbent)	34.0%	1,626			
Labour	Angela Taylor	22.4%	1,073	1,157.6	1,193.9	1,260.9
SNP	Gordon Scott Townson (incumbent)	22.3%	1,065	1,139	1,164.9	1,222.6
Conservative	Bill Berry	15.2%	728	843	871.3	896.7
Green	Bex Holmes	3.1%	149	182.3	221.6	
Independent	Paul Briggs	2.9%	140	166.4		
Electorate: 11,858 Valid: 4,781 Spoilt: 47 Quota: 1,196 Turnout: 4,828 (40.32%)

=== 2011 by-election ===
Airyhall/Broomhill/Garthdee by-election 23 June 2011 - 1 Seat
Party	Candidate	FPv%	Count							
Party	Candidate	FPv%	1	2	3	4	5	6	7	8
SNP	Gordon Scott Townson	33.2	1,112	1,115	1,120	1,136	1,161	1,263	1,441	1,792
Labour	Angela Taylor	23.3	783	783	784	810	829	956	1,068	
Conservative	Bill Berry	19.4	649	652	654	656	676	801		
Liberal Democrats	Gregor McAbery	16.5	554	558	562	584	599			
Independent	Graham Murray Bennett	2.9	98	99	109	122				
Green	Richie Brian	3.0	101	103	104					
Independent	Hamish Hay Mackay	1.0	32	34						
National Front	Dave Macdonald	0.7	25							
SNP gain from Liberal Democrats		Swing	18.5%							
Electorate: 11,623 Valid: 3,354 Spoilt: 32 Quota: 1,678 Turnout: 3,386 (29.1%)

=== 2007 election ===
2007 Aberdeen City Council election

Airyhall/Broomhill/Garthdee - 3 seats
Party	Candidate	FPv%	Count			
Party	Candidate	FPv%	1	2	3	4
Conservative	Jill Wisely	27.4	1,911			
Liberal Democrats	Scott Cassie	19.6	1,365	1,381	1,446	1,695
Liberal Democrats	Ian Yuill	18.0	1,257	1,310	1,385	1,565
SNP	Rigg Robertson	17.3	1,207	1,220	1,296	1,399
Labour	Allan McIntosh	12.8	894	901	940	
Independent	Graham Bennett	4.8	332	352		
Electorate: Valid: 6,966 Spoilt: 80 Quota: 1,742 Turnout: 7,046
