= Frank Doran (British politician) =

British Labour Party politician (1949–2017)

- Doran in 2011

Chair of the Administration Committee
- In office 20 July 2005 – 11 May 2010
- Preceded by: Position established
- Succeeded by: Alan Haselhurst

Member of Parliament for Aberdeen North Aberdeen Central (1997–2005)
- In office 1 May 1997 – 30 March 2015
- Preceded by: Malcolm Savidge
- Succeeded by: Kirsty Blackman

Member of Parliament for Aberdeen South
- In office 11 June 1987 – 16 March 1992
- Preceded by: Gerry Malone
- Succeeded by: Raymond Robertson

Personal details
- Born: 13 April 1949 Edinburgh, Scotland
- Died: 31 October 2017 (aged 68) London, England
- Citizenship: British
- Party: Labour
- Spouses: Pat Govan (divorced) Joan Ruddock (m. 2010)
- Children: 2 sons
- Education: University of Dundee

Frank Doran (13 April 1949 – 31 October 2017) was a Labour Party politician in the United Kingdom, who was the Member of Parliament (MP) for Aberdeen South from 1987 to 1992, when he lost his seat. He was re-elected in 1997 to Aberdeen Central, and most recently represented Aberdeen North. He was the husband of former Labour MP Dame Joan Ruddock; it was the second marriage of both politicians.

He announced he would be standing down in 2015, saying "I don’t want to be wandering around here as a skeleton...I think that we need to allow younger people to come through.”

== Education and early career ==
Doran attended the Ainslie Park Secondary School (later the Ainslie Park High School) in East Pilton and Leith Academy in Leith before leaving school at age 16. He took a job at the North of Scotland Hydro-Electric Board and was promoted to junior clerk in the legal department within a year. There, he was encouraged in his interest in law by Assistant Secretary of the Board Douglas Nellands, and he started taking night classes. After a few years, he attended the University of Dundee, where he was awarded a LLB degree in 1975. He was admitted as a solicitor in 1977 and was in practice until 1988.

== Political career ==
He unsuccessfully contested the European Parliament seat of Scotland North East in 1984. He was elected to the House of Commons at the 1987 general election for Aberdeen South by defeating the sitting Conservative and Unionist MP Gerry Malone. He was promoted to the opposition frontbench by Neil Kinnock in 1988, as a spokesperson on energy, leading on oil and gas.

Doran lost the Aberdeen South seat at the 1992 general election by the Conservative and Unionist candidate Raymond Robertson. This was the only seat in which an incumbent Labour MP who stood for re-election lost to a Conservative candidate at that election. During his time out of Parliament, Doran was appointed by the Trade Unions to run the statutory political fund ballot campaign for the majority of Trade Unions who had political funds, until he was re-elected at the 1997 general election for the new constituency of Aberdeen Central.

He was appointed as the Parliamentary Private Secretary to the Minister of State at the Department of Trade and Industry Ian McCartney in 1997. He remained in position when McCartney transferred to the Cabinet Office in 1999, after which he became a member of the Culture, Media and Sport Select committee in 2001.

Following changes to the electoral boundaries in Scotland, the constituency of Aberdeen Central was abolished prior to the 2005 general election, Doran was forced to compete against the incumbent Aberdeen North MP, Malcolm Savidge, for the Labour Party candidacy in a much-altered Aberdeen North seat. Doran won the nomination, and was elected to represent the new Aberdeen North seat with a majority of 6,795 votes. The victory gave Frank Doran the unique distinction of having represented Aberdeen South, Aberdeen Central and Aberdeen North during his parliamentary career.

Doran was, on 20 July 2005, elected Chairman of the Administration Committee, and in this role he sat on the Finance and Services, Liaison and Works of Art committees. Doran served as Chairman until the end of the Parliament on 11 May 2010. He was Chairman of the Advisory Committee on Works of Art, the Secretary to the All-Party Fisheries Group, the GMB Parliamentary Group, the Trade Union Group of Labour MPs, and the All Party Dance Group; and he was also Treasurer of All-Party Oil and Gas Group.

== Votes ==
In March 2003, Doran voted that the case had not yet been made for war against Iraq. He voted against a motion calling for an independent inquiry by a committee of Privy Counsellors into the Iraq War in 2007.

He voted against the replacement of the Trident system.

He voted in favour of allowing both unmarried heterosexual and homosexual couples to adopt, in favour of the Civil Partnership Bill, and in favour of same-sex marriage.

== MP queue-jumping controversy ==
Doran sparked outrage as Chair of the Administration Committee, when the committee ruled that researchers and secretaries working in the House of Commons must allow MPs to jump ahead of them in the queue for the canteen. Staffers described the rules as "feudal", and complained they were being treated as second-class citizens. Doran, however, said: "You cannot have an MP standing in a queue for ages: they are very busy people". He acknowledged that the way in which staff were told about the ruling may have been better handled.

== Personal life ==
Doran had two sons from his first marriage, which ended in divorce in the 1990s. He was later married to Dame Joan Ruddock from 2010 until his death.

== Death ==
Frank Doran died on 31 October 2017 in London, aged 68.

Parliament of the United Kingdom
Preceded by Gerry Malone	Member of Parliament for Aberdeen South; 1987 – 1992	Succeeded by Raymond Robertson
New constituency	Member of Parliament for Aberdeen Central; 1997 – 2005	Constituency abolished
Preceded by Malcolm Savidge	Member of Parliament for Aberdeen North; 2005–2015	Succeeded by Kirsty Blackman
