= West End, Aberdeen =

Coordinates: 57.1365°N 2.1385°W

West End: Scottish Gaelic: Ceann Siar
- Location within the Aberdeen City council area Location within Scotland
- Council area: Aberdeen City
- Lieutenancy area: Aberdeen
- Country: Scotland
- Sovereign state: United Kingdom
- Post town: Aberdeen
- Postcode district: AB15
- Dialling code: 01224
- Police: Scotland
- Fire: Scottish
- Ambulance: Scottish
- UK Parliament: Aberdeen South
- Scottish Parliament: Aberdeen Central

West End is a district near the centre of Aberdeen, Scotland. It extends across Queens Road and Great Western Road. West End ends at Anderson Drive/South Anderson Drive.
