= Aberdeen Deeside and North Kincardine =

Constituency of the Scottish Parliament

- County constituency for the Scottish Parliament
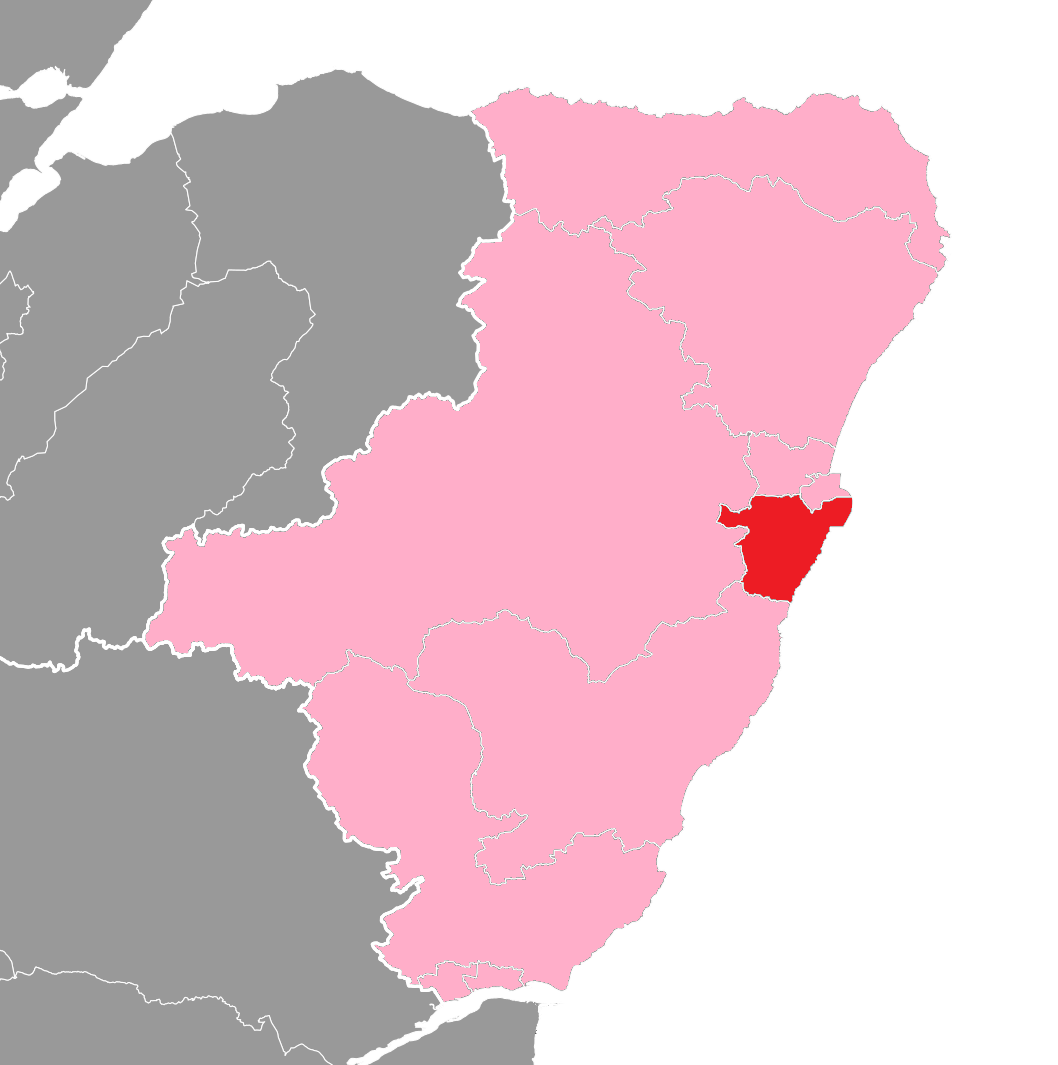

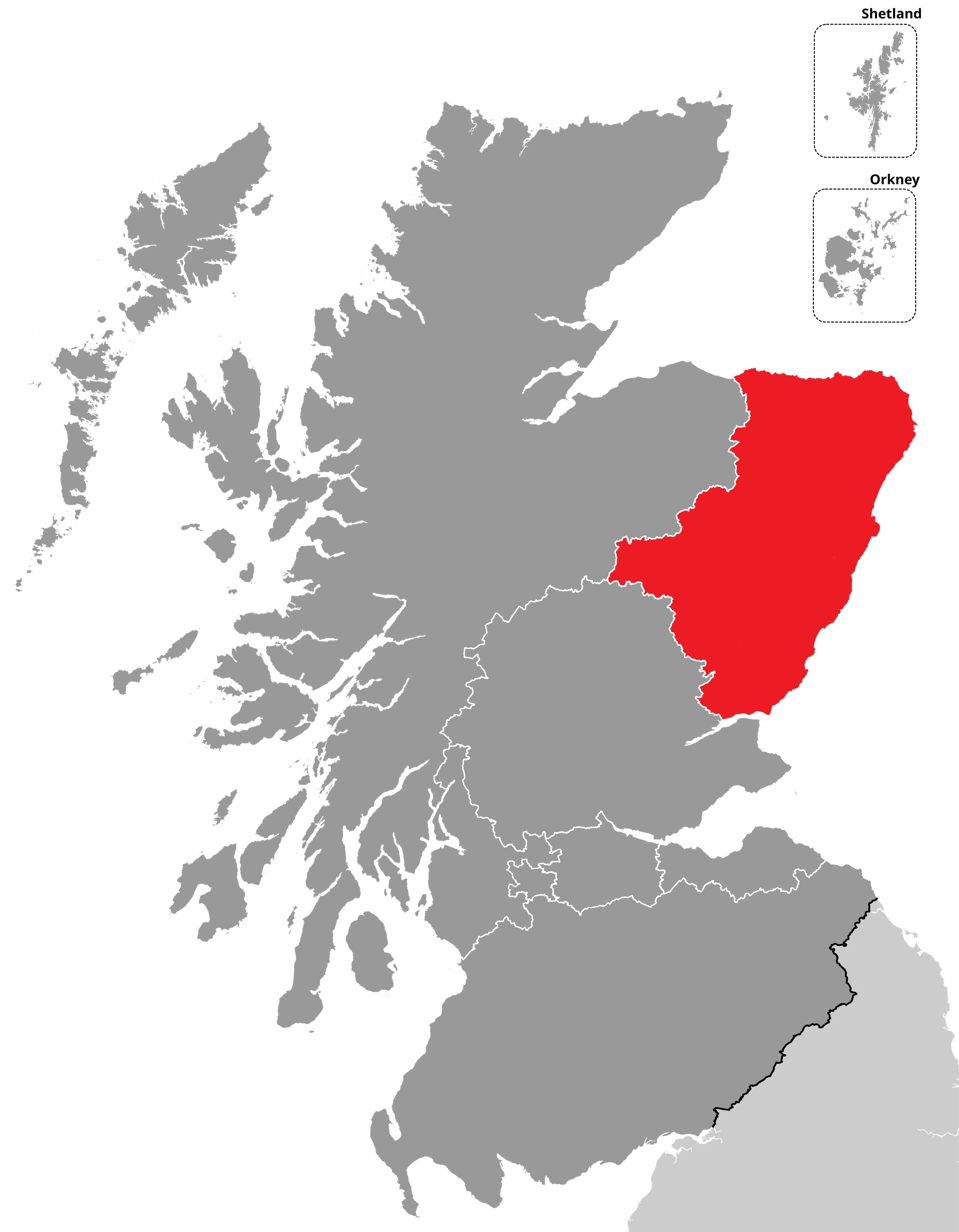
- Aberdeen Deeside and North Kincardine shown within the North East Scotland electoral region and the region shown within Scotland
- Electoral region: North East Scotland
- Electorate: 62,985 (2026)

Current constituency
- Created: 2011
- Party: Scottish National Party
- MSP: Stephen Flynn
- Council area: Aberdeen City; Aberdeenshire
- Created from: Aberdeen South, West Aberdeenshire & Kincardine

Aberdeen Deeside and North Kincardine is a county constituency of the Scottish Parliament covering part of the Aberdeen City council area and Aberdeenshire. Under the additional-member electoral system used for elections to the Scottish Parliament, it elects one Member of the Scottish Parliament (MSP) by the first past the post method of election. It is also one of ten constituencies in the North East Scotland electoral region, which elects seven additional members, in addition to the ten constituency MSPs, to produce a form of proportional representation for the region as a whole.

The constituency was created for 2011 Scottish Parliament election, and combines most of the former Aberdeen South seat along with part of Aberdeenshire that was formerly in West Aberdeenshire and Kincardine. It has been held by Stephen Flynn of the Scottish National Party since the 2026 Scottish Parliament election. Prior to the second periodic review of Scottish Parliament boundaries in 2025 the constituency was known as Aberdeen South and North Kincardine; the change of name was implemented so as to maintain consistency with the naming of the Aberdeen Donside seat. The seat's borders were left unchanged at this review.

== Electoral region ==
The other nine constituencies of the North East Scotland region are: Aberdeen Central, Aberdeen Donside, Aberdeenshire East, Aberdeenshire West, Angus North and Mearns, Angus South, Banffshire and Buchan Coast, Dundee City East and Dundee City West. The region covers all of the Aberdeen City council area, the Aberdeenshire council area, the Angus council area, the Dundee City council area and part of the Moray council area.

== Constituency boundaries and council area ==
Outline of the constituency

For the first election to the Scottish Parliament, the constituencies used were the same as those already in existence for the House of Commons. For the 2005 general election, the boundaries of the House of Commons constituencies were subject to some alteration, and so these constituencies and those for the Scottish Parliament diverged. There is no longer any link between the two sets of boundaries. Following the first periodic review of parliamentary constituencies to the Scottish Parliament, the Boundary Commission for Scotland created newly shaped seats for the Aberdeen City council area and Aberdeenshire, which were first used at the 2011 Election.

Aberdeen City is divided between three Scottish Parliament constituencies: Aberdeen Central, Aberdeen Donside, and Aberdeen Deeside and North Kincardine. Central and Donside are entirely within the city area, while Deeside and North Kincardine also takes in North Kincardine in the Aberdeenshire council area. The remainder of Aberdeenshire is represented by four further constituencies in the Scottish Parliament: Aberdeenshire East, Aberdeenshire West, Angus North and Mearns and Banffshire and Buchan Coast.

The seat is formed of the following wards of Aberdeen City Council and Aberdeenshire Council:

- In Aberdeen:
  - Lower Deeside (entire ward)
  - Kincorth/Nigg/Cove (entire ward)
  - Hazlehead/Queens Cross/Countesswells (shared with Aberdeen Central)
  - Airyhall/Broomhill/Garthdee Ward (shared with Aberdeen Central)
  - Torry/Ferryhill wards (shared with Aberdeen Central)
- Aberdeenshire:
  - North Kincardine (entire ward)

== Member of the Scottish Parliament ==
Election	Member	Party
Constituency created from: Aberdeen South and West Aberdeenshire and Kincardine
2011	Maureen Watt	Scottish National Party
2021	Audrey Nicoll	Scottish National Party
2026	Stephen Flynn	Scottish National Party

== Election results ==
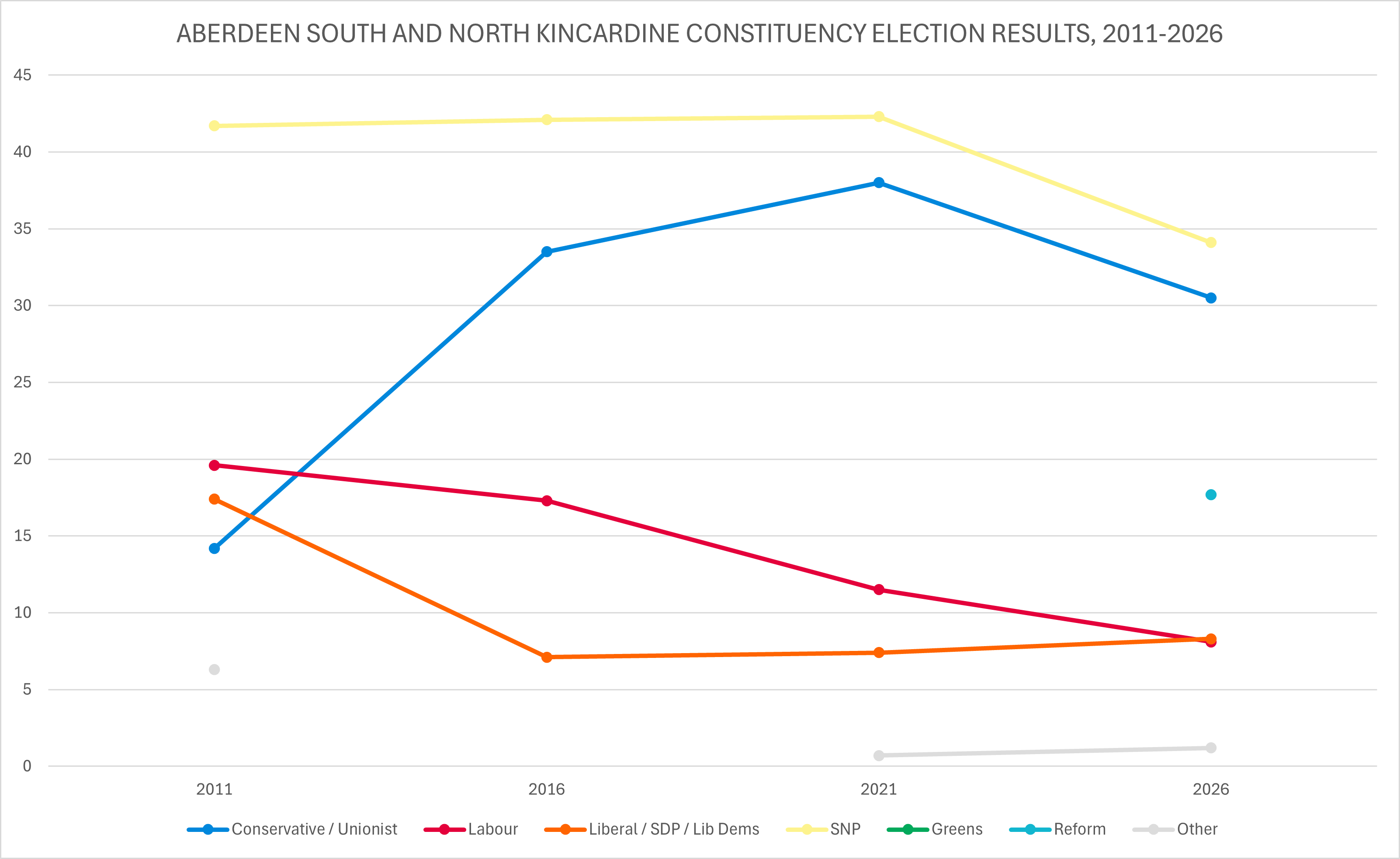
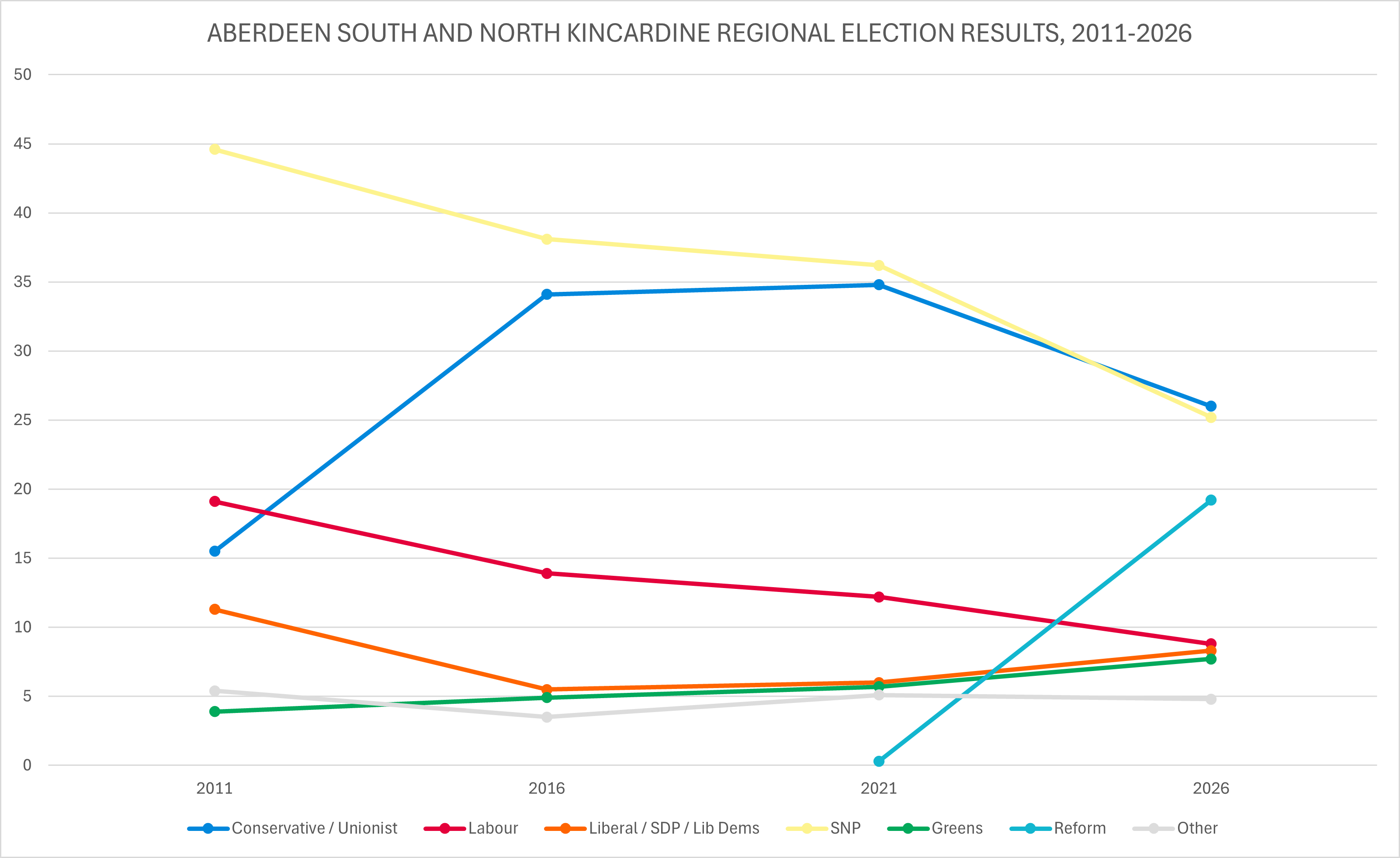

=== 2020s ===
2026 Scottish Parliament election: Aberdeen Deeside and North Kincardine
Party	Candidate	Constituency			Regional		
Party	Candidate	Votes	%	±%	Votes	%	±%
SNP	Stephen Flynn	11,788	34.1	▼8.2	8,750	25.20	▼11.02
Conservative	Liam Kerr (Note: Incumbent member on the party list, or for another constituency)	10,544	30.5	▼7.5	9,042	26.04	▼8.80
Reform	Duncan Massey (Note: Elected on the party list)	6,113	17.7	New	6,676	19.23	▲18.91
Labour	Matthew Lee	2,805	8.1	▼3.4	3,039	8.75	▼3.44
Liberal Democrats	Mel Sullivan	2,880	8.3	▲0.9	2,879	8.29	▲2.31
Green					2,671	7.69	▲1.95
Independent	Marie Boulton				545	1.57	New
Scottish Family					262	0.75	▲0.11
Independent Green Voice					224	0.65	▲0.21
AtLS					188	0.54	New
ISP					140	0.40	New
Independent	Iris Leask	431	1.2	New	129	0.37	New
Scottish Socialist					70	0.20	New
Workers Party					68	0.20	New
Advance UK					37	0.11	New
Majority		1,244	3.6	▼0.7			
Valid votes		34,561			34,720		
Invalid votes		108			70		
Turnout		34,669	55.0	▼9.3	34,790	55.2	▼9.2
SNP hold		Swing					
Notes

2021 Scottish Parliament election: Aberdeen South and North Kincardine
Party	Candidate	Constituency			Regional		
Party	Candidate	Votes	%	±%	Votes	%	±%
SNP	Audrey Nicoll	16,500	42.3	▲0.2	14,156	36.22	▼1.9
Conservative	Liam Kerr (Note: Incumbent member on the party list, or for another constituency)	14,829	38.0	▲4.5	13,619	34.84	▲0.7
Labour	Lynn Thomson	4,505	11.5	▼5.8	4,766	12.19	▼1.7
Liberal Democrats	Ian Yuill	2,889	7.4	▲0.3	2,338	5.98	▲0.5
Green					2,243	5.74	▲0.8
Alba					710	1.82	New
Scottish Family					250	0.64	New
All for Unity					249	0.64	New
Independent Green Voice					173	0.44	New
Abolish the Scottish Parliament					128	0.33	New
Reform					124	0.32	New
Scottish Libertarian	Stephen Jamieson	286	0.7	New	78	0.20	0.0
Freedom Alliance (UK)					78	0.20	New
UKIP					61	0.16	▼1.7
Restore Scotland					43	0.11	New
Independent	Laura Marshall				42	0.11	New
Independent	Geoffrey Farquharson				15	0.04	New
Renew					14	0.04	New
Majority		1,671	4.3	▼4.3			
Valid votes		39,009			39,087		
Invalid votes		98			62		
Turnout		39,107	64.3	▲9.9	39,149	64.4	▲10.1
SNP hold		Swing		▼2.4			

=== 2010s ===
2016 Scottish Parliament election: Aberdeen South and North Kincardine
Party	Candidate	Constituency			Regional		
Party	Candidate	Votes	%	±%	Votes	%	±%
SNP	Maureen Watt (Note: Incumbent member for this constituency)	13,604	42.1	▲0.4	12,348	38.1	▼6.5
Conservative	Ross Thomson	10,849	33.5	▲19.4	11,039	34.1	▲18.6
Labour	Alison Evison	5,603	17.3	▼2.3	4,496	13.9	▼5.2
Liberal Democrats	John Waddell	2,284	7.1	▼10.4	1,776	5.5	▼5.9
Green					1,577	4.9	▲0.9
UKIP					611	1.9	▲0.8
Scottish Christian					229	0.7	0.0
Solidarity					78	0.2	▲0.2
Communist					60	0.2	New
Scottish Libertarian					57	0.2	New
National Front					50	0.2	▼0.1
RISE					47	0.1	New
Majority		2,755	8.6	▼13.5			
Valid votes		32,340			32,368		
Invalid votes		131			56		
Turnout		32,471	54.4	▲1.5	32,424	54.3	▲2.0
SNP hold		Swing		▼9.9			
Notes

2011 Scottish Parliament election: Aberdeen South and North Kincardine
Party	Candidate	Constituency			Region		
Party	Candidate	Votes	%	±%	Votes	%	±%
SNP	Maureen Watt (Note: Incumbent member on the party list, or for another constituency)	11,947	41.7	N/A	12,653	44.6	N/A
Labour	Greg Williams	5,624	19.6	N/A	5,423	19.1	N/A
Conservative	Stewart Whyte	4,058	14.2	N/A	4,402	15.5	N/A
Liberal Democrats	John Sleigh	4,994	17.4	N/A	3,215	11.3	N/A
Independent	Marie Boulton	1,816	6.3	N/A			
Green					1,113	3.9	N/A
All-Scotland Pensioners Party					402	1.4	N/A
UKIP					314	1.1	N/A
Scottish Christian					200	0.7	N/A
Socialist Labour					175	0.6	N/A
BNP					169	0.6	N/A
Scottish Socialist					85	0.3	N/A
National Front	Ross Willett	214	0.7	N/A	62	0.2	N/A
Solidarity					21	0.1	N/A
Angus Independents					13	0.0	N/A
Others					104	0.4	N/A
Majority		6,323	22.1	N/A			
Valid votes		28,653			28,351		
Invalid votes		91			73		
Turnout		28,744	52.9	N/A	28,424	52.3	N/A
SNP win (new seat)							

== See also ==
- List of Scottish Parliament constituencies and electoral regions (2026–)
