= Torry/Ferryhill =

Council ward in Aberdeen, Scotland

- Aberdeen City Council
- Boundary of Torry/Ferryhill in Aberdeen from 2017.
- Electorate: 15,012

Current ward
- Created: 2007
- Councillor: Christian Allard (SNP)
- Councillor: Michael Kusznir (Conservative)
- Councillor: Simon Peter Watson (Labour)
- Councillor: Lee Fairfull (SNP)

Torry/Ferryhill is one of the thirteen wards used to elect members of the Aberdeen City Council. It elects four Councillors.

== Councillors ==
| Election | Councillors | | | |
|---|---|---|---|---|
| 2007 | Irene Cormack (Liberal Democrats) | Alan Donnelly (Conservative) | Yvonne Allan (Labour) | Jim Kiddie (SNP) |
| 2012 | Graham Robert Dickson (SNP) | Alan Donnelly (Conservative) | Yvonne Allan (Labour) | Jim Kiddie (SNP) |
| 2017 | Christian Allard (SNP) | Alan Donnelly (Conservative) | Yvonne Allan (Labour) | Catriona MacKenzie (SNP) |
| 2019 by-election | Christian Allard (SNP) | Alan Donnelly (Conservative) | Yvonne Allan (Labour) | Audrey Nicoll (SNP) |
| 2022 | Christian Allard (SNP) | Michael Kusznir (Conservative) | Simon Peter Watson (Labour) | Lee Fairfull (SNP) |

== Election results ==
=== 2022 election ===
Torry/Ferryhill – 4 seats
| Party | Candidate | FPv% | Count | | | | | | | |
| Party | Candidate | FPv% | 1 | 2 | 3 | 4 | 5 | 6 | 7 | 8 |
|---|---|---|---|---|---|---|---|---|---|---|
| SNP | Christian Allard (incumbent) | 32.9 | 1,646 | | | | | | | |
| Conservative | Michael Kusznir | 19.4 | 970 | 975 | 982 | 988 | 996 | 1,023 | | |
| Labour | Simon Peter Watson | 17.3 | 864 | 894 | 897 | 900 | 904 | 966 | 972 | 1,138 |
| Green | Esme Houston | 7.8 | 390 | 433 | 433 | 438 | 458 | 513 | 514 | 566 |
| SNP | Lee Fairfull | 6.9 | 344 | 824 | 825 | 833 | 891 | 928 | 929 | 950 |
| Liberal Democrats | Gregor McAbery | 6.4 | 318 | 327 | 329 | 336 | 339 | 372 | 379 | |
| Independent | Simon McLean | 4.8 | 238 | 247 | 252 | 305 | 331 | | | |
| Alba | Brian Allan | 2.5 | 123 | 142 | 146 | 148 | | | | |
| Independent | Paul Dawson | 1.5 | 77 | 85 | 87 | | | | | |
| Scottish Libertarian | Oren Katz | 0.5 | 27 | 27 | | | | | | |
Electorate: 15,012 Valid: 4,997 Spoilt: 123 Quota: 1,000 Turnout: 34.1%

=== 2019 by-election ===
Torry/Ferryhill by-election (21 November 2019)
| Party | Candidate | FPv% | Count | | | | | |
| Party | Candidate | FPv% | 1 | 2 | 3 | 4 | 5 | 6 |
|---|---|---|---|---|---|---|---|---|
| SNP | Audrey Nicoll | 43.2 | 1,618 | 1,620 | 1,624 | 1,673 | 1,819 | 1,989 |
| Conservative | Neil Murray | 26.0 | 972 | 983 | 996 | 1,049 | 1,083 | 1,151 |
| Labour | Willie Young | 10.6 | 395 | 396 | 402 | 462 | 533 | |
| Liberal Democrats | Gregor McAbery | 8.4 | 315 | 320 | 324 | | | |
| Green | Betty Lyon | 8.1 | 304 | 320 | 347 | 429 | | |
| Independent | Simon McLean | 2.3 | 86 | 89 | | | | |
| UKIP | Roy Hill | 1.4 | 53 | | | | | |
Electorate: 15,443 Valid: 3,743 Spoilt: 40 Quota: 1,872 Turnout: 3,783 (24.5%)

=== 2017 election ===
2017 Aberdeen City Council election

Torry/Ferryhill – 4 seats
| Party | Candidate | FPv% | Count | | | | | | | | |
| Party | Candidate | FPv% | 1 | 2 | 3 | 4 | 5 | 6 | 7 | 8 | 9 |
|---|---|---|---|---|---|---|---|---|---|---|---|
| Conservative | Alan Donnelly (incumbent)‡‡ | 26.1 | 1,337 | | | | | | | | |
| SNP | Christian Allard | 17.8 | 910 | 913.6 | 914.6 | 920.7 | 963.9 | 988.4 | 1,013.4 | 1,037.7 | 1,159.3 |
| SNP | Catriona MacKenzie‡‡‡‡‡ | 16.5 | 847 | 851.2 | 851.2 | 854.2 | 915.4 | 956.4 | 1,001.4 | 1,017.3 | 1,143.1 |
| Labour | Yvonne Allan (incumbent)‡ | 16.5 | 843 | 873.7 | 873.7 | 881.4 | 908.9 | 989.7 | 1,324.2 | | |
| Independent | David Fryer | 11.3 | 580 | 616.7 | 619.8 | 629.2 | 681.2 | 754.7 | 799.0 | 846.3 | |
| Labour | Piotr Teodorowski | 9.1 | 467 | 474.8 | 474.8 | 476.8 | 499.09 | 547.4 | | | |
| Liberal Democrats | Gregor McAbery | 5.6 | 286 | 332.7 | 333.7 | 340.01 | 377.5 | | | | |
| Green | Renée Slater | 5.3 | 269 | 274.7 | 275.7 | 282.8 | | | | | |
| UKIP | William McIntosh | 1.0 | 49 | 65.7 | | | | | | | |
| National Front | Billy Watson | 0.2 | 10 | 10.5 | | | | | | | |
Electorate: TBC Valid: 5,598 Spoilt: 144 Quota: 1,120 Turnout: 5,742 (37.8%)

=== 2012 election ===
2012 Aberdeen City Council election

Torry/Ferryhill - 4 seats
| Party | Candidate | FPv% | Count | | | | | | | | | |
| Party | Candidate | FPv% | 1 | 2 | 3 | 4 | 5 | 6 | 7 | 8 | 9 | 10 |
|---|---|---|---|---|---|---|---|---|---|---|---|---|
| Labour | Yvonne Allan (incumbent) | 26.4% | 1,134 | | | | | | | | | |
| SNP | Graham Robert Dickson | 16.5% | 706 | 726.2 | 726.2 | 729.4 | 734.2 | 741.7 | 755.1 | 768.6 | 804.4 | 862.1 |
| Conservative | Alan Donnelly (incumbent)† | 15.3% | 657 | 663.8 | 663.8 | 667.8 | 677.1 | 684.8 | 690.8 | 715.3 | 819.5 | 890.5 |
| SNP | Jim Kiddie (incumbent) | 14.4% | 619 | 631.7 | 631.7 | 634.7 | 640.1 | 649.6 | 667.6 | 692.6 | 730.1 | 797.8 |
| Labour | Kathryn Russell | 8.0% | 345 | 523.6 | 524.6 | 527.4 | 531.3 | 548.3 | 575.4 | 610.4 | 704.5 | |
| Liberal Democrats | Richard Robertson * | 7.7% | 331 | 335.9 | 335.9 | 335.9 | 340.9 | 346.4 | 376.3 | 400.8 | | |
| Independent | David Fryer | 3.9% | 169 | 173.9 | 177.1 | 177.1 | 197.6 | 234.5 | 257 | | | |
| Green | Andrew Reekie | 3.1% | 131 | 137.3 | 139.6 | 139.8 | 139.8 | 154.3 | | | | |
| Independent | Suzanne Kelly | 2.1% | 91 | 101.2 | 108.2 | 111.2 | 124.9 | | | | | |
| Independent | William Brown | 1.4% | 61 | 67.3 | 71.3 | 72.3 | | | | | | |
| National Front | Billy Watson | 0.5% | 23 | 24.9 | 24.9 | | | | | | | |
| Independent | Hamish Hay MacKay | 0.5% | 21 | 21.5 | | | | | | | | |
Electorate: 14,625 Valid: 4,288 Spoilt: 118 Quota: 858 Turnout: 4,406 (29.32%)

=== 2007 election ===
2007 Aberdeen City Council election

Torry/Ferryhill - 4 seats
| Party | Candidate | FPv% | Count | | | | | | | |
| Party | Candidate | FPv% | 1 | 2 | 3 | 4 | 5 | 6 | 7 | 8 |
|---|---|---|---|---|---|---|---|---|---|---|
| SNP | Jim Kiddie | 30.9 | 1,900 | | | | | | | |
| Labour | Yvonne Allan | 20.7 | 1,275 | 1,275 | | | | | | |
| Liberal Democrats | Irene Cormack | 17.5 | 1,077 | 1,155 | 1,160 | 1,169 | 1,202 | 1,397 | | |
| Conservative | Alan Donnelly | 11.9 | 729 | 757 | 758 | 762 | 796 | 818 | 846 | 889 |
| Green | John Reekie | 4.7 | 287 | 386 | 388 | 431 | 476 | 528 | 564 | 672 |
| Labour | Ted Harris | 5.7 | 348 | 415 | 440 | 458 | 478 | 511 | 538 | |
| Liberal Democrats | Tony Petchey | 4.4 | 270 | 334 | 335 | 345 | 364 | | | |
| Independent | Chris Cowie | 2.6 | 163 | 198 | 199 | 219 | | | | |
| Solidarity | Shug Falconer | 1.7 | 102 | 150 | 151 | | | | | |
Electorate: Valid: 6,151 Spoilt: 112 Quota: 1,231 Turnout: 6,263
