= Stephen Flynn =

Scottish politician (born 1988)

The Right Honourable Stephen Flynn MSP
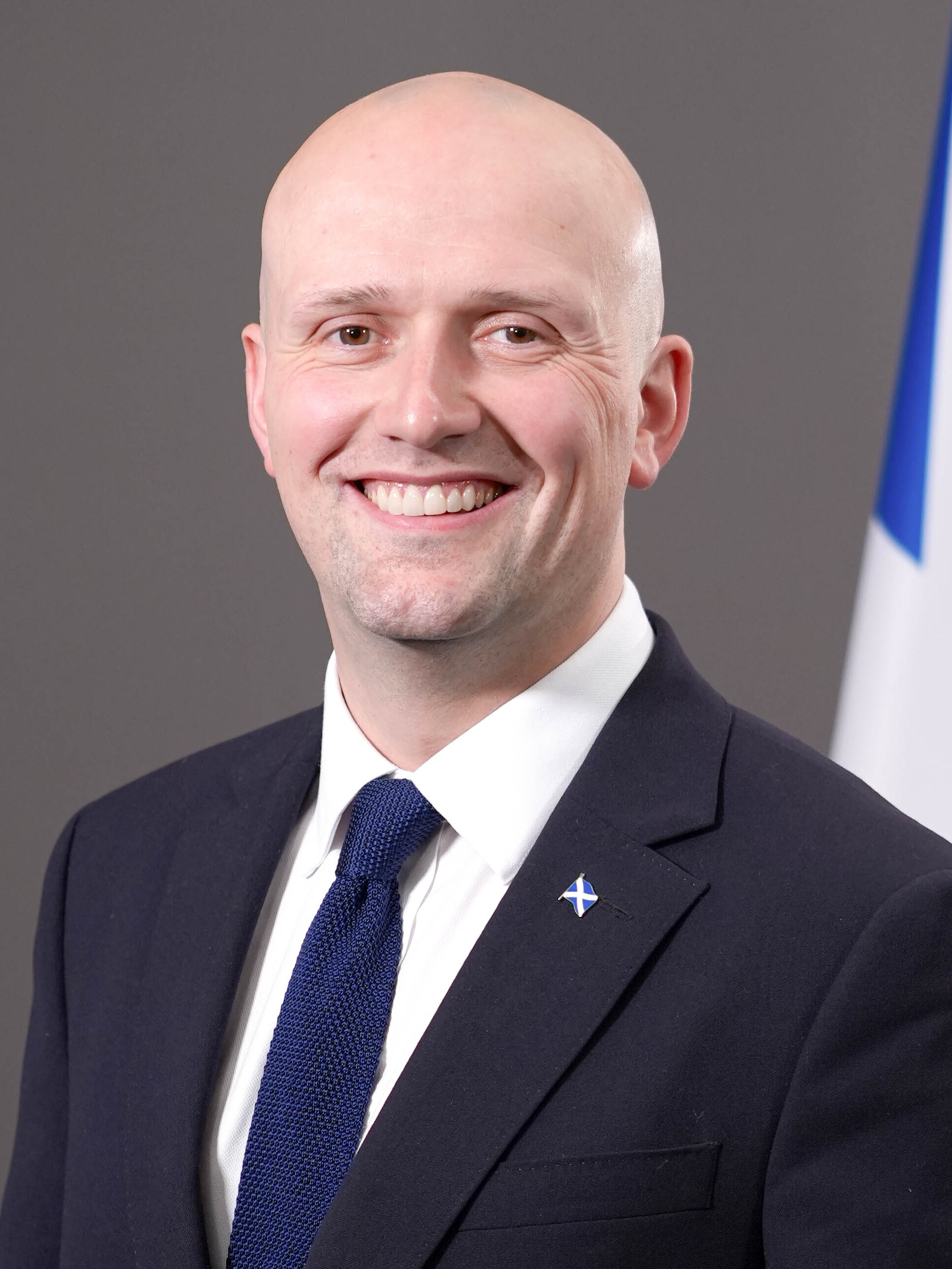
- Official portrait, 2026

Cabinet Secretary for Economy, Tourism and Transport
- Incumbent
- Assumed office 21 May 2026
- First Minister: John Swinney
- Preceded by: Kate Forbes (Economy); Fiona Hyslop (Transport)
SNP frontbench roles
Leader of the Scottish National Party in the House of Commons
In office 6 December 2022 – 10 May 2026
Deputy	Mhairi Black; Pete Wishart
Party Leader	Nicola Sturgeon; Humza Yousaf; John Swinney
Preceded by	Ian Blackford
Succeeded by	Dave Doogan
SNP Spokesperson for Business, Energy and Industrial Strategy in the House of Commons
In office 1 February 2021 – 6 December 2022
Leader	Ian Blackford
Preceded by	Drew Hendry
Succeeded by	Alan Brown (Energy and Industrial Strategy)

Member of the Scottish Parliament for Aberdeen Deeside and North Kincardine
- Incumbent
- Assumed office 7 May 2026
- Preceded by: Audrey Nicoll
- Majority: 1,244 (3.6%)

Member of Parliament for Aberdeen South
- In office 12 December 2019 – 14 May 2026
- Preceded by: Ross Thomson
- Succeeded by: Douglas Lumsden

Personal details
- Born: Stephen Mark Flynn; 13 October 1988 (age 38) Dundee, Scotland
- Party: Scottish National Party
- Spouse: Lynn Flynn
- Children: 2
- Education: University of Dundee (MA, MLitt)

Stephen Mark Flynn (born 13 October 1988) is a Scottish politician who has served as Cabinet Secretary for Economy, Tourism and Transport since 2026. A member of the Scottish National Party (SNP), he has been Member of the Scottish Parliament (MSP) for Aberdeen Deeside and North Kincardine since 2026, and was Member of Parliament (MP) for Aberdeen South from 2019 to 2026. He served as the leader of the SNP in the House of Commons from December 2022 until May 2026.

== Early life and career ==
Stephen Mark Flynn was born on 13 October 1988 in Dundee, and went to school in Brechin and Dundee. He studied at the University of Dundee, graduating with an undergraduate Master of Arts (MA Hons) in history and politics, and a Master of Letters (MLitt) degree in international politics and security studies.

Flynn worked as an assistant to Callum McCaig and in the office of Maureen Watt in Aberdeen.

Flynn was first elected to Aberdeen City Council for the Kincorth/Nigg/Cove Ward in 2015 and served as leader of the SNP group on Aberdeen City Council from 2016 until his election to Parliament in 2019. Flynn resigned as a councillor because he could not effectively serve on the council and as an MP at the same time.

== Member of Parliament (2019–2026) ==
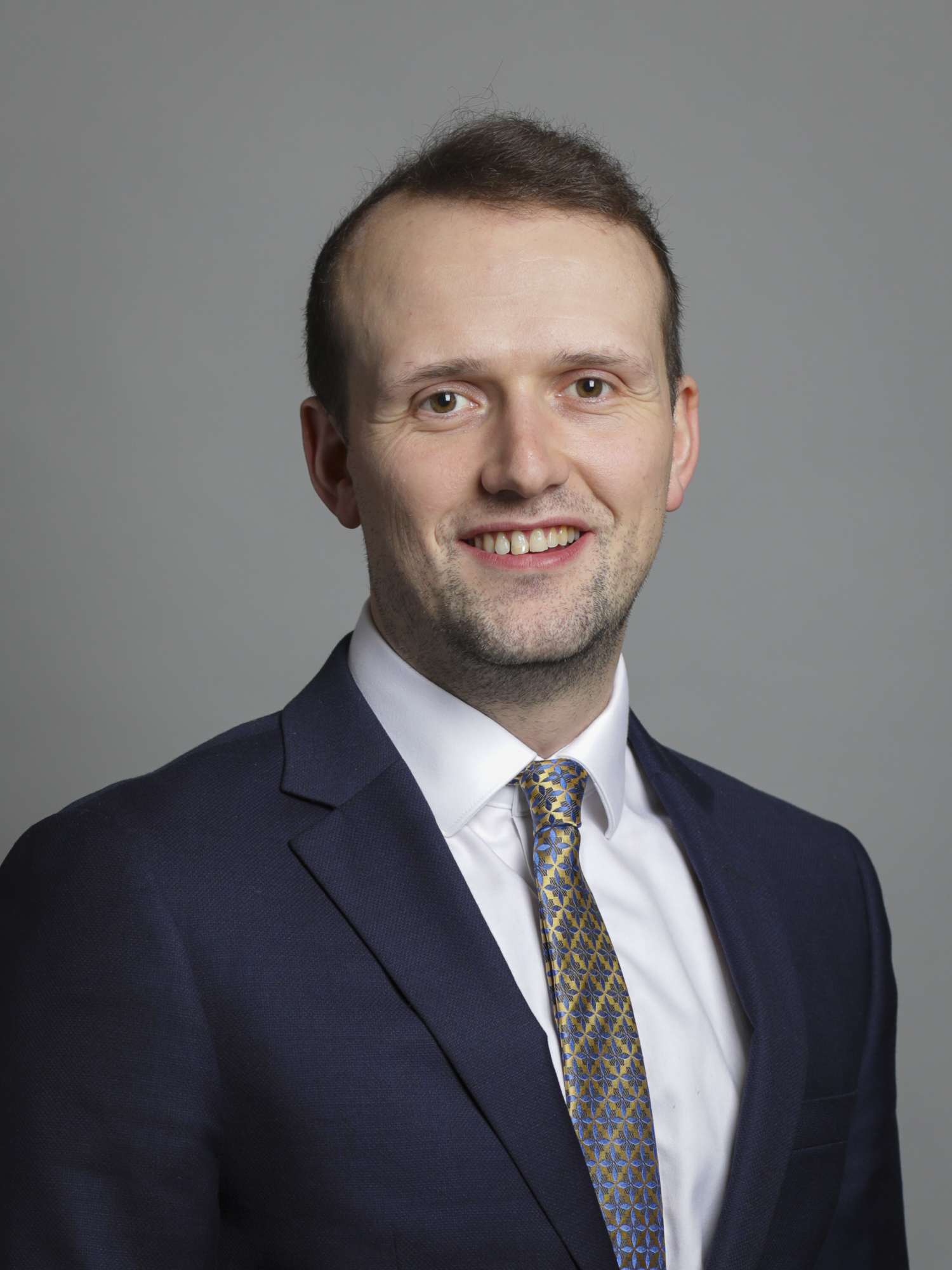
Flynn in 2019

Flynn was elected to Parliament as MP for Aberdeen South at the 2019 general election with 45% of the vote and a majority of 3,990 votes. Following his election, Flynn was appointed to the role of Shadow SNP Deputy Spokesperson (Treasury – Financial Secretary). He was promoted to the front bench in February 2021 as Shadow SNP Spokesperson (Business, Energy and Industrial Strategy).

=== SNP Westminster leader ===
In December 2022, Ian Blackford announced he would stand down as the SNP Westminster Group Leader, after Flynn had made his plans to challenge his leadership at that month's AGM clear internally, Flynn announced his candidacy for the role. Flynn defeated Alison Thewliss 26–17 in a vote of Scottish National Party MPs. His appointment to the Privy Council was announced on 28 March 2024 as part of the 2024 Special Honours, granting him the style The Right Honourable for life.

Flynn's leadership came at a time of a cost of living crisis and when the United Kingdom's Supreme Court set out that the Scottish Parliament does not have the devolved competence to hold an independence referendum without the consent of the British Government. First Minister Nicola Sturgeon had set out plans for the next election to the House of Commons to be a proxy referendum on independence, putting the Frontbench Team at the centre of a constitutional campaign within Scotland.

In February 2024, Flynn was highly critical of the role of the speaker of the House of Commons Lindsay Hoyle during a parliamentary debate on a Gaza ceasefire motion. Flynn stated that "he and his party has been treated with utter contempt and would need "significant convincing" that the Speaker's position was "not now intolerable". The SNP motion was criticised by, amongst others, David Lammy, who stated that "The SNP motion appears one sided. For any ceasefire to work, it must, by necessity, be observed by both sides, or it is not a ceasefire...Israelis have the right to the assurance that the horror of 7 October cannot happen again."

=== 2024 general election ===
In the 2024 general election, the SNP lost 39 of its 48 seats. The SNP became the second largest party in the UK Parliament representing Scottish seats, having won 9 seats. Across the United Kingdom, the result was a Labour Party landslide victory, and similarly in Scotland, Scottish Labour became the largest party representing Scottish constituencies at Westminster, a position they last held before the 2015 election. Flynn was re-elected to Parliament as MP for Aberdeen South with a decreased vote share of 32.8% and a decreased majority of 3,758.

As a result, Flynn unveiled a reduced frontbench including himself, Pete Wishart as his deputy and Kirsty Blackman as chief whip.

=== Suspension of rebel Labour MPs ===
On 23 July 2024, the Labour Party withdrew the whip from 7 of its MPs who had supported an amendment tabled by Flynn to scrap the two child benefit cap. Flynn stated that scrapping the cap would immediately raise 300,000 children out of poverty. MPs rejected the SNP amendment by 363 votes to 103. The seven Labour MPs suspended for six months were John McDonnell, Richard Burgon, Ian Byrne, Rebecca Long-Bailey, Imran Hussain, Apsana Begum and Zarah Sultana, four of whom (Burgon, Byrne, Long-Bailey, and Hussain) had the whip restored in February 2025. McDonnell and Begum had the whip restored in September 2025, however Sultana had resigned from the party earlier that year in July.

=== Double jobbing controversy ===
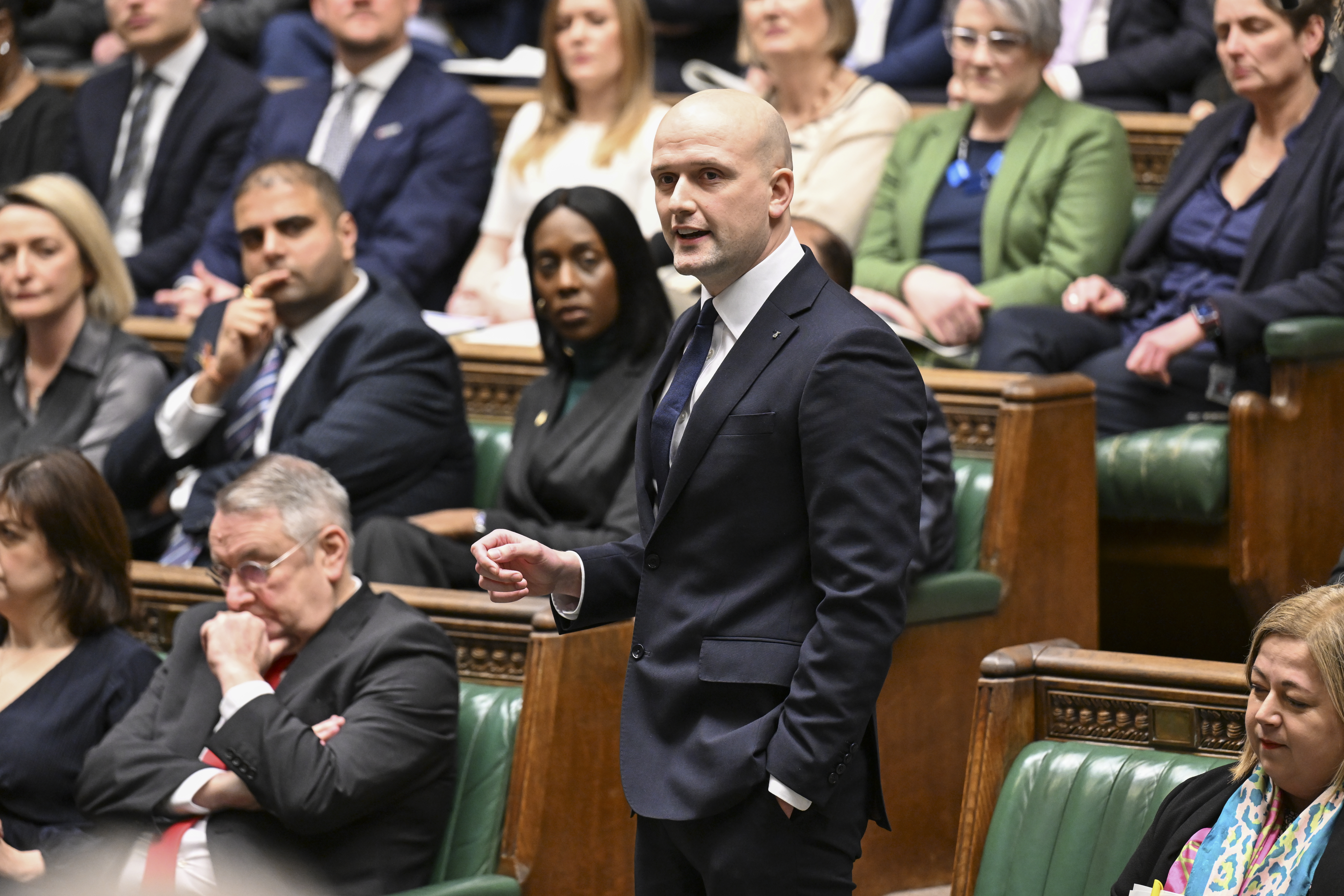
Flynn speaking during Prime Minister's Questions, 7 February 2024

In November 2024, Flynn announced that he intended to stand as the SNP candidate for Aberdeen South and North Kincardine for the 2026 Scottish Parliament election, whilst remaining as the MP for Aberdeen South in Westminster. Flynn's plan to potentially hold a dual mandate – known as "double jobbing" in British politics – sparked significant controversy: SNP party rules introduced prior to the 2021 Holyrood election require SNP MPs to resign their seat at Westminster before seeking selection to Holyrood. The SNP had previously criticised Scottish Conservative leader Douglas Ross for simultaneously holding Westminster and Holyrood seats. Flynn claimed the party rules were "election-specific".

Flynn's announcement faced backlash from within the SNP and opposition parties. Former SNP MP Joanna Cherry, who abandoned a selection bid for Holyrood in 2020 owing to the change in rules, sarcastically remarked in a post on Twitter that the rule was "person-specific" and predicted that, having "served its purpose", it would not be in place for the next Holyrood election. Former SNP Minister George Adam and SNP MSP Emma Roddick also criticised Flynn's decision, while incumbent MSP Audrey Nicoll reaffirmed her intent to run. Emma Roddick's criticism was met with negative press briefing by an unnamed SNP source to the Daily Mail, which described her as "a rubbish MSP who has achieved nothing and has everything to lose from a more talented class of SNP politicians coming through to shake up Holyrood and inject a bit of imagination and life where lazy MSPs like her have so badly failed." This prompted calls for unity from the SNP Social Justice Secretary Shirley-Anne Somerville.

First Minister John Swinney said that the SNP had yet to come to a decision on whether its politicians could double job, but remarked that "We've had times in the past when we've had dual mandates – I had a dual mandate myself for two years in the early days of devolution", and would make a decision "in the fullness of time". Critics, including the Scottish Conservatives and Labour, accused Flynn of hypocrisy and supported motions to ban double jobbing. Flynn abandoned his plan on 21 November 2024, stating he would not pursue a dual mandate.

On 1 April 2025, Flynn confirmed that he planned to stand for the SNP in the 2026 Holyrood election, saying that he was "delighted to have been nominated by SNP members across Aberdeen South and North Kincardine" to stand as a candidate. The constituency has since been renamed Aberdeen Deeside and North Kincardine.

=== Cronyism controversy ===
In February 2025, internal SNP sources accused Flynn of running a "boys' brigade" in Westminster amid reports that he had identified a group of all-female SNP MSPs he wanted to stand down from the Scottish Parliament to make room for ex-MPs who had lost their seats in the 2024 general election. The alleged "hit list", which included Collette Stevenson, Jackie Dunbar, Emma Roddick, Evelyn Tweed, and Karen Adam, was reported to have been drawn up at Flynn's direction by Aberdeenshire North and Moray East MP Seamus Logan. A spokesperson for Flynn dismissed the allegations, saying the report was "total nonsense and entirely untrue". An SNP source told The National; "I don't think it's nonsense. I'm not surprised by the news story, by the list, by it being only women. That is the feeling that I have had throughout, with the whole Tuesday boys' club, the way that the party in Westminster is run."

=== Peter Mandelson scandal ===
In September 2025, Flynn made a speech in the House of Commons that was highly critical of Keir Starmer's conduct surrounding Peter Mandelson's sacking as British Ambassador to the United States amid controversy surrounding Mandelson's ties to sex offender Jeffrey Epstein.

== Scottish Parliament (2026–present) ==
Flynn was elected to the Scottish Parliament on 7 May 2026 in the constituency of Aberdeen Deeside and North Kincardine. He received 11,788 votes. Flynn resigned his seat in the House of Commons due to this, triggering a by-election.

=== Cabinet career ===
After his election, Flynn was appointed Cabinet Secretary for Economy, Tourism and Transport in the Second Swinney government.

On 9 September 2026, Flynn told a Scottish Parliament transport committee meeting that he was unaware of a BBC report about a methane gas leak aboard MV Glen Sannox in June 2025. Documents subsequently released under freedom of information legislation showed that emails about the report had been sent to his office shortly before the meeting. Committee convener Willie Rennie accused Flynn of attempting a cover-up. Flynn denied having been briefed, and Transport Scotland said the emails had not been shared with him before his appearance. First Minister John Swinney expressed confidence in Flynn.

== Personal life ==
Flynn is married to Lynn Flynn with two children, and is a Dundee United FC supporter. His father Mark Flynn is a Dundee City councillor who was elected as leader of the council in August 2024.

Flynn has suffered from a serious condition called avascular necrosis since his teens and underwent a hip replacement for it in 2020. In 2023, he told The News Agents "I was disabled" before the operation, and had walked with a crutch for eighteen years, which led to him reading more as a child.

Parliament of the United Kingdom
Preceded by Ross Thomson	Member of Parliament for Aberdeen South; 2019–2026	Succeeded by Douglas Lumsden
Party political offices
Preceded by Ian Blackford	Leader of the Scottish National Party in the House of Commons; 2022–present	Incumbent
