= Audrey Nicoll =

Scottish National Party politician

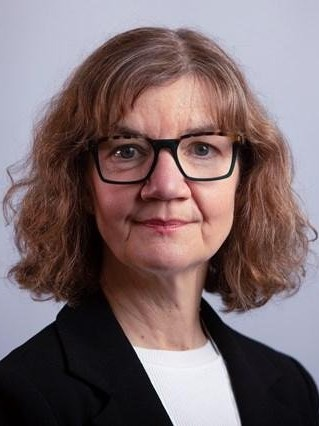
- Official portrait, 2021

Member of the Scottish Parliament for Aberdeen South and North Kincardine
- In office 6 May 2021 – 9 April 2026
- Preceded by: Maureen Watt
- Succeeded by: Stephen Flynn

Personal details
- Born: Audrey Gibb; 1961 (age 64–65) Aberdeen, Scotland
- Party: Scottish National Party
- Spouse: Alex Nicoll

Audrey Elizabeth Nicoll (née Gibb; born 1961) is a Scottish politician who served as the Member of the Scottish Parliament (MSP) for Aberdeen South and North Kincardine from 2021 to 2026. A member of the Scottish National Party (SNP), she has represented the Torry/Ferryhill ward in the Aberdeen City Council from 2019 to 2022.

== Early life ==
Nicoll was born Audrey Gibb in Aberdeen. She worked as a detective sergeant police officer in both uniformed and specialist roles, retiring in 2015. After retiring, she gave lectures in the School of Nursing, Midwifery and Paramedic Practice at Robert Gordon University.

== Political career ==
On 21 November 2019 she was elected to Aberdeen City Council in the by-election for the Torry/Ferryhill ward.

On 7 May 2021 in the 2021 Scottish Parliament election she was elected as Member of the Scottish Parliament (MSP) for Aberdeen South and North Kincardine.

In November 2024, Nicoll was involved in a dispute with SNP Westminster leader Stephen Flynn, who announced his intention to stand as the SNP candidate in Nicoll's Holyrood constituency at the 2026 Scottish Parliament election. Flynn's decision to double-job between the Westminster and Holyrood parliaments was controversial, with figures both in and outside the SNP speculating that Flynn had asked Nicoll to stand aside for him. Nicoll issued a statement declaring her intent to stand again in her constituency in the 2026 election: "As a constituency MSP, my focus will remain to work tirelessly for constituents regardless of any internal party selection processes. I look forward to any contest, where of course it will be for branch members to select those they wish to represent them in Holyrood in the 2026 Scottish Parliament elections." Flynn explicitly denied suggestions that he had asked Nicoll to step aside, and said that he had had a "fairly cordial conversation" by phone with Audrey Nicoll. A source close to Nicoll, however, told BBC Scotland that she had perceived an "underlying inference" in the phone call that he wanted her to stand down. Facing significant criticism, on 21 November 2024, Flynn announced that he would not seek a dual mandate to stand in both Westminster and Holyrood.

On 9 February 2025, Nicoll announced that she would stand down at the 2026 Scottish Parliament election. A spokesman said her decision to stand down was unrelated to Stephen Flynn's interest in her seat. She later told The National “By the time you reach my age, and especially having worked in a male-dominated work environment for 31 years, I’m not in the game of being pressurised by men into doing something that isn’t right for me”. She left Holyrood at the 2026 Scottish Parliament election and was succeeded in her constituency by Stephen Flynn.

== Personal life ==
Nicoll is married to Alex Nicoll, the SNP's group leader in Aberdeen.

Scottish Parliament
Preceded by Maureen Watt	MSP for Aberdeen South and North Kincardine; 2021 – 2026	Incumbent
