= 2017 Aberdeen City Council election =

2017 Scottish local government election

- 4 May 2017

All 45 seats to Aberdeen City Council 23 seats needed for a majority
- Turnout: 37.6%
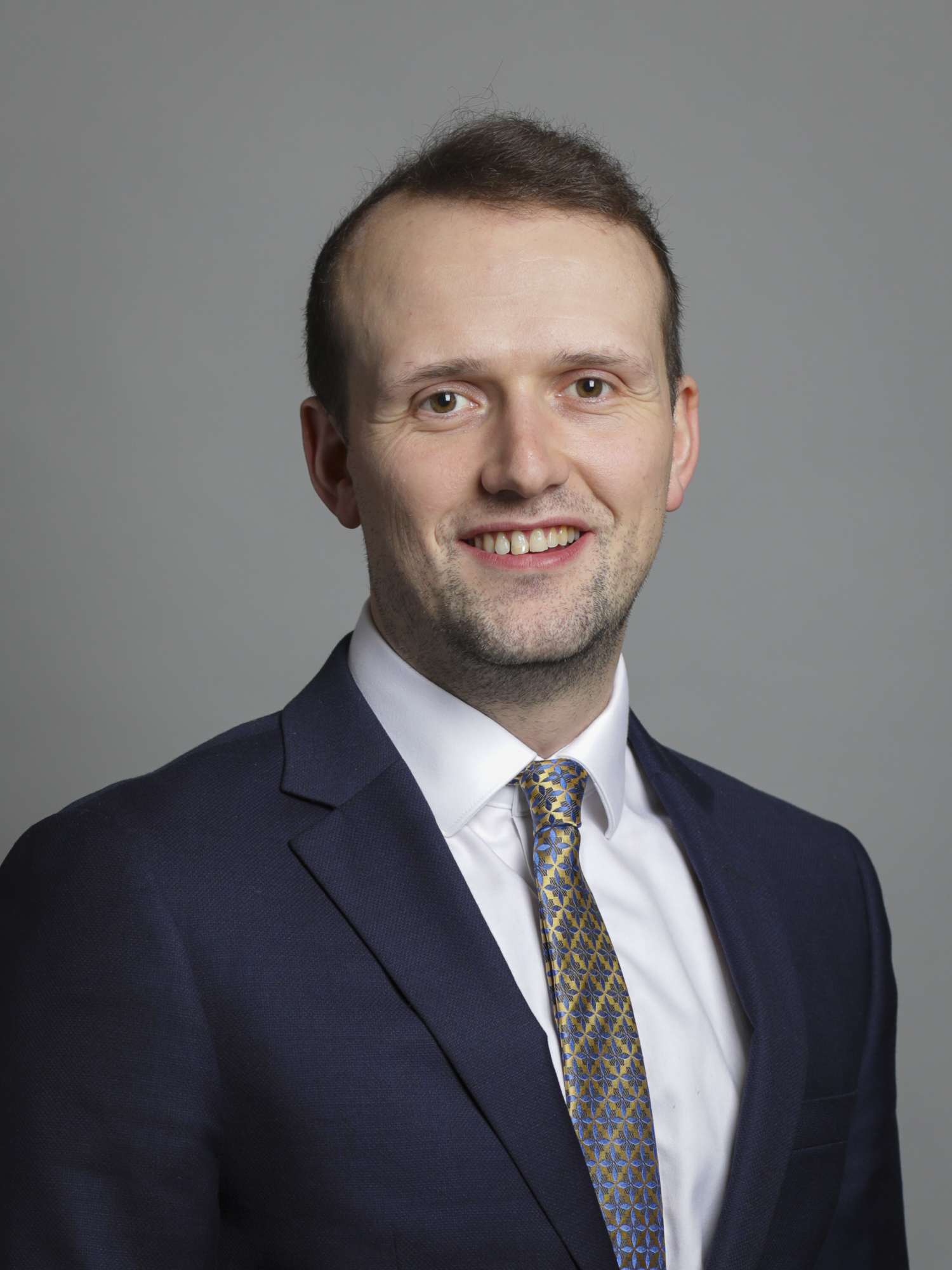

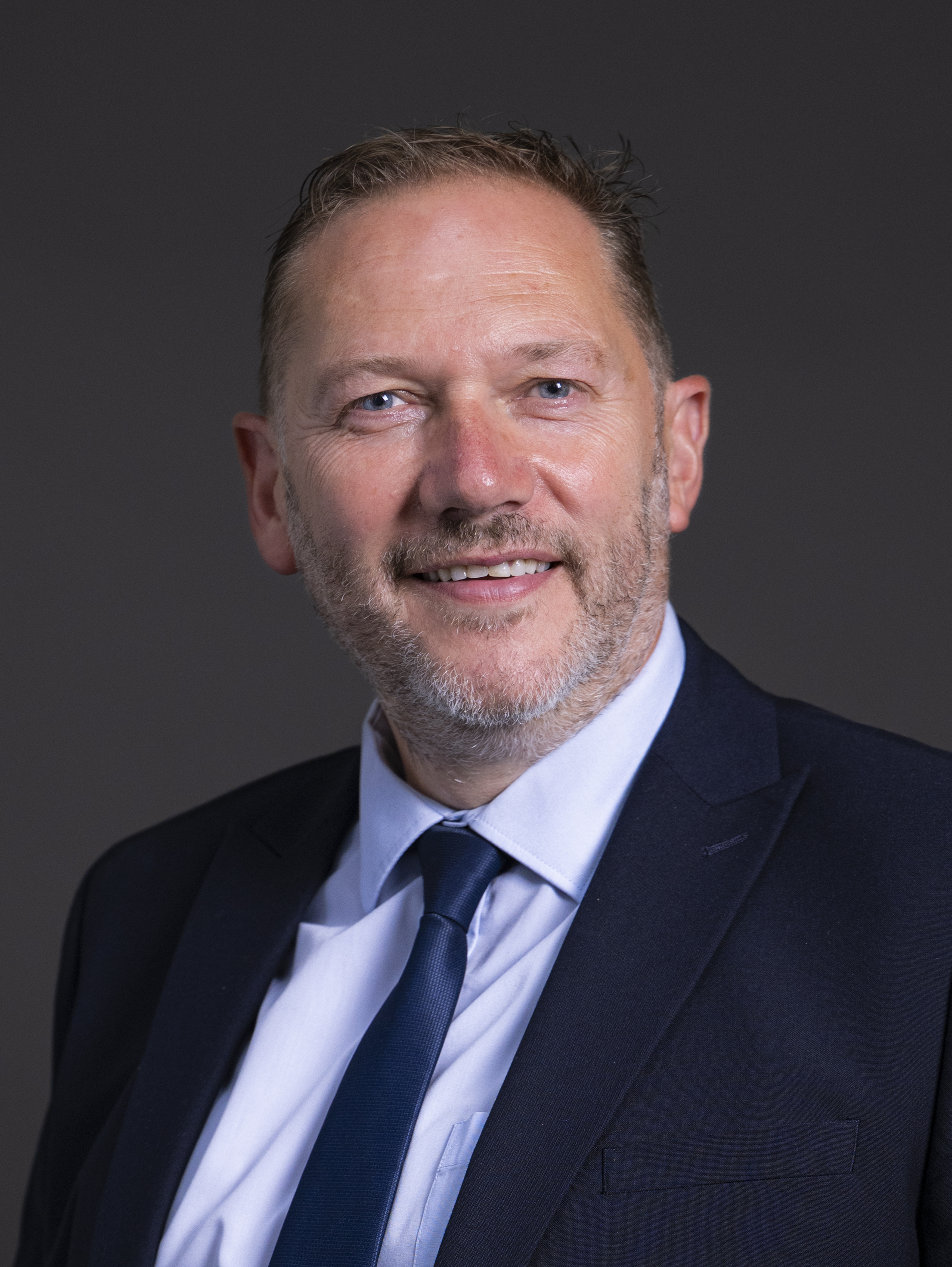

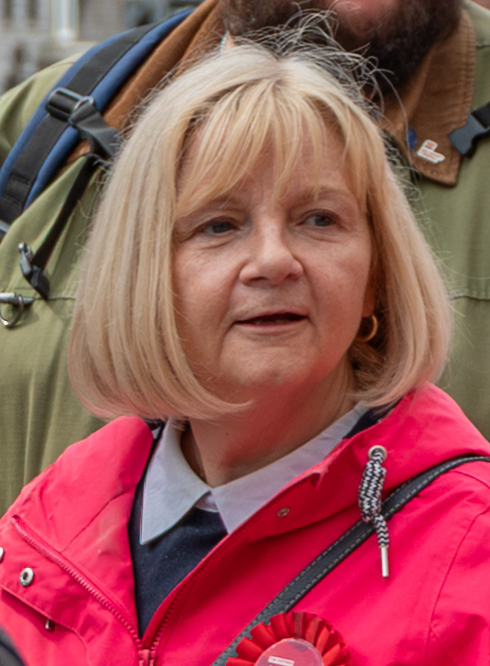

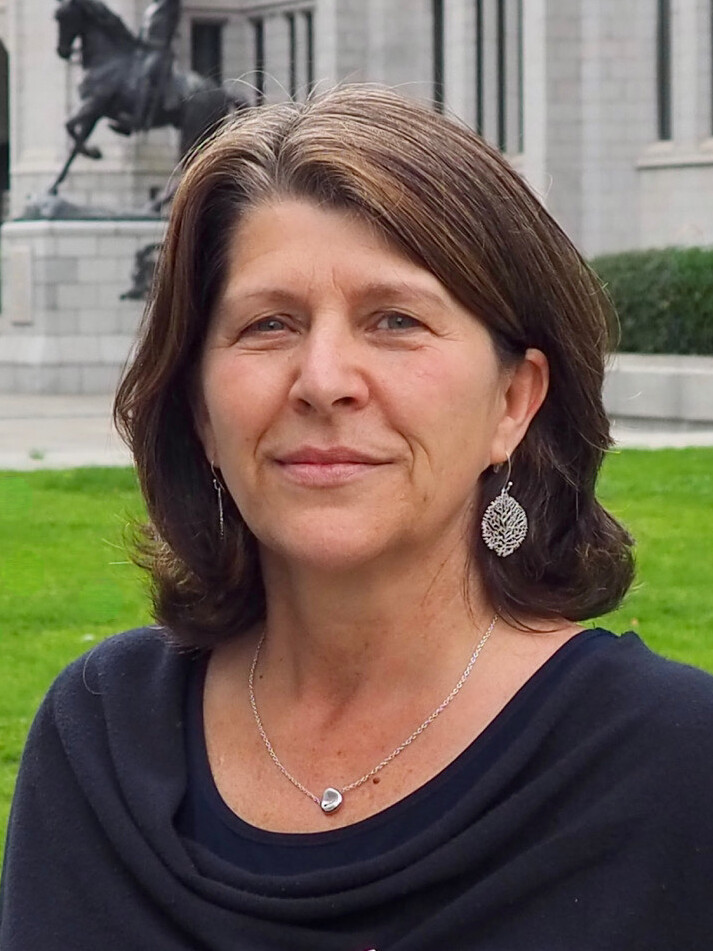
	First party	Second party	Third party
Leader	Stephen Flynn	Douglas Lumsden	Jenny Laing
Party	SNP	Conservative	Labour
Leader's seat	Kincorth/Nigg/Cove	Airyhall/Broomhill/Garthdee	Midstocket/Rosemount
Last election	15 seats, 31.3%	3 seats, 9.7%	17 seats, 29.7%
Seats won	19	11	9
Seat change	▲4	▲8	▼8
Popular vote	22,690	17,427	11,784
Percentage	32.6%	25.0%	16.9%
Swing	▲1.3%	▲15.4%	▼12.8%
	Fourth party	Fifth party
Leader	Ian Yuill	Marie Boulton
Party	Liberal Democrats	Independent
Leader's seat	Airyhall/Broomhill/Garthdee	Lower Deeside
Last election	5 seats, 15.1%	3 seats, 11.2%
Seats won	4	2
Seat change	▼1	▼1
Popular vote	10,753	5,195
Percentage	15.4%	7.9%
Swing	▲0.3%	▼3.3%
- The 13 multi-member wards
Council Leader before election
Jenny Laing
Labour
Council Leader after election
Jenny Laing
Labour (suspended)

The 2017 Aberdeen City Council election took place on 4 May 2017 to elect members of Aberdeen City Council. The election used the 13 wards created as a result of the Local Governance (Scotland) Act 2004, with each ward electing three or four Councillors using the single transferable vote system form of proportional representation, with a total of 45 Councillors elected, an increase in two members from 2012.

The Scottish National Party won 19 seats, the Scottish Conservatives won 11, Scottish Labour won nine, the Scottish Liberal Democrats won four and there were two independent members. On 11 May, the Lib Dems, ruled out entering into a formal coalition and instead would "consider every issue before the council on its merits on a case-by-case basis."

On 17 May, an agreement was reached to form a coalition between the Tories, Labour and the three independent councillors, up from two after councillor Jennifer Stewart resigned from the Liberal Democrat group to sit as an Independent and give the coalition an overall majority. The coalition agreed by Aberdeen's Labour councillors was without the party executive's approval and so the councillors were told to withdraw from the deal by 5pm on 17 May or face suspension. The deadline passed without any change to the coalition and as such, all 9 Labour councillors were suspended from the party.

In August, the co-leadership was ratified by a meeting of the full council, appointing Douglas Lumsden (Con) & Jenny Laing (Lab) as co-leaders.

== Election results ==
Aberdeen City local election result 2017
Party	Seats	Gains	Losses	Net gain/loss	Seats %	Votes %	Votes	+/−
SNP	19	—	—	+4	42.2	32.4	22,690	+1.1
Conservative	11	—	—	+8	24.4	24.7	17,427	+15.1
Labour	9	—	8	−8	17.8	17.7	12,496	−12.0
Liberal Democrats	4	—	—	−1	8.9	15.2	10,753	+0.1
Independent	2	—	—	−1	4.4	7.4	5,195	−3.8
Green	0	—	—	—	0.0	2.2	1,538	−0.3
UKIP	0	—	—	—	0.0	0.3	202	+0.2
National Front	0	—	—	—	0.0	0.06	39	-0.39
Scottish Libertarian	0	—	—	—	0.0	0.05	31	New
Solidarity	0	—	—	—	0.0	0.04	28	New
Total	45						69,687	

== Ward results ==
=== Dyce/Bucksburn/Danestone ===
- 2012: 2xSNP; 2xLab
- 2017: 1xCons; 2xSNP; 1XLab
- 2012–2017 Change:−1 Lab; +1 Cons

Dyce/Bucksburn/Danestone – 4 seats
Party	Candidate	FPv%	Count					
Party	Candidate	FPv%	1	2	3	4	5	6
Conservative	Avril MacKenzie	30.4	2,012					
SNP	Neil MacGregor (incumbent)	25.3	1,670					
SNP	Gill Samarai (incumbent)	11.9	785	798.7	1,087.3	1,115.5	1,176.8	1,317.9
Labour	Barney Crockett (incumbent)‡	11.3	744	806	813.5	1,141.6	1,273.4	1,483.7
Independent	Coral Duthie	7.7	509	658.1	669.8	708.9	942.9	
Labour	Graeme Lawrence (incumbent)	6.9	458	504.9	514.3			
Liberal Democrats	Dorothy Pearce	6.5	430	614.5	625.5	666.2		
Electorate: TBC Valid: 6,608 Spoilt: 145 Quota: 1,322 Turnout: 6,753 (44.2%)

=== Bridge of Don ===
- 2012: 2xSNP; 1xIndependent; 1xLab
- 2017: 1xCons; 2xSNP; 1xIndependent
- 2012–2017 Change: −1 Lab; +1 Cons

Bridge of Don – 4 seats
Party	Candidate	FPv%	Count								
Party	Candidate	FPv%	1	2	3	4	5	6	7	8	9
Conservative	Brett Hunt‡‡‡‡	25.8	1,868								
SNP	Alison Alphonse	22.2	1,610								
Independent	John Reynolds (incumbent)	14.4	1,045	1,132.2	1,137.6	1,140.1	1,179.6	1,327.2	1,598.9		
SNP	Sandy Stuart (incumbent)‡‡‡	11.9	862	869.9	996.7	1,000.4	1,009.7	1,056.04	1,130.7	1,157.8	1,373.4
Labour	Willie Young (incumbent)	11.1	805	849.9	854.09	856.2	856.2	871.3	1,026.3	1,047.03	
Liberal Democrats	Karen Farquhar	9.2	669	782.9	791.2	794.3	803.5	850.2			
Independent	George Saunders	3.8	279	305.8	308.5	317.7	338.9				
Independent	Simon McLean	1.0	70	83.3	84.07	91.9					
Solidarity	James Irving-Lewis	0.4	28	32.7	35.2						
Electorate: TBC Valid: 7,236 Spoilt: 114 Quota: 1,448 Turnout: 7,350 (49.3%)

=== Kingswells/Sheddocksley/Summerhill ===
- 2017: 1xLDem; 1xSNP; 1xCons
- 2012–2017: New ward

Kingswells/Sheddocksley/Summerhill – 3 seats
Party	Candidate	FPv%	Count						
Party	Candidate	FPv%	1	2	3	4	5	6	7
Liberal Democrats	Steve Delaney *	36.2	1,825						
SNP	David John Cameron *	17.7	895	972.5	974.8	997.8	1,668.7		
Conservative	John Wheeler	15.8	797	951.8	979.9	1,000.8	1,009	1,033.3	1,341.6
Labour	Barry Mitchell	13.7	690	767.8	779	818.1	848.7	952.7	
SNP	Josh Mennie	13.4	678	722.8	731.3	769.7			
Green	Pippa Robertson	1.8	90	149.6	159.4				
UKIP	Philip Clarke	1.4	68	77.5					
Electorate: TBC Valid: 5,043 Spoilt: 85 Quota: 1,261 Turnout: 5,128 (45.5%)

- = Sitting Councillors for Kingswells/Sheddocksley Ward.

=== Northfield/Mastrick North ===
- 2017: 2x SNP; 1xLab
- 2012–2017 Change: New ward

Northfield/Mastrick North – 3 seats
Party	Candidate	FPv%	Count							
Party	Candidate	FPv%	1	2	3	4	5	6	7	8
SNP	Jackie Dunbar*	39.9%	1,747							
Labour	Gordon Graham *‡	15.8%	692	728.1	740.5	779.9	885.5	902.8	911.07	1,551.3
Labour	Frank Gilfeather	14.4%	629	655.8	661.8	693.2	788.6	798.8	809.9	
Conservative	Alan Martin	8.6%	376	379.7	395.7	430.6				
SNP	Ciaran McRae	8.4%	370	742.6	748.5	764.7	776.2	1,206.7		
SNP	Jessica Mennie	7.6%	333	486.5	494.01	502.9	516.2			
Liberal Democrats	Sam Forman	3.5%	154	169.7	188.02					
Independent	Faith Robertson-Foy	1.8%	81	86.2						
Electorate: TBC Valid: 4,382 Spoilt: 180 Quota: 1,096 Turnout: 4,562 (37.2%)

- = Sitting Councillors for Northfield Ward.

=== Hilton/Woodside/Stockethill ===
- 2017: 1x SNP; 1xLab; 1xCons
- 2012–2017 Change: New ward

Hilton/Woodside/Stockethill – 3 seats
Party	Candidate	FPv%	Count							
Party	Candidate	FPv%	1	2	3	4	5	6	7	8
SNP	Neil Copland *	25.3%	1,148							
Conservative	Freddie John	19.6%	889	889.2	914.2	933.2	991.2	1,019.2	1,039.7	1,235.2
Labour	Lesley Dunbar *‡	18%	818	818.9	843.9	870.9	913.9	1,252.9		
SNP	Lauren Wards	16.1%	729	738.9	761.09	829.4	884.5	906.7	925.03	
Labour	Lewis MacLeod	8.1%	369	369.3	379.3	393.3	445.3			
Liberal Democrats	Sam Petchey	4.8%	219	219.2	248.2	308.3				
Green	Peter Kennedy	4.1%	186	186.5	223.5					
Independent	David Page Henderson	3.9%	179	179.4						
Electorate: TBC Valid: 4,537 Spoilt: 137 Quota: 1,135 Turnout: 4,674 (40.5%)

- = Sitting Councillors for Hilton/Stockethill ward.

=== Tillydrone/Seaton/Old Aberdeen ===
- 2012: 2xLab; 1xSNP
- 2017: 2xSNP; 1Lab
- 2012–2017 Change: −1 Lab; +1 SNP

Tillydrone/Seaton/Old Aberdeen – 3 seats
Party	Candidate	FPv%	Count								
Party	Candidate	FPv%	1	2	3	4	5	6	7	8	9
Labour	Ross Grant (incumbent)‡	27%	867								
SNP	Alexander McLellan	25.6%	825								
SNP	Jim Noble (incumbent)	16.9%	545	549.6	566.9	569.9	582.9	595.2	682.9	774.5	839.7
Conservative	Emma Farquhar	10.6%	342	344.3	344.5	350.5	372.5	408.7	432.1	471.2	
Labour	Ramsay Milne (incumbent)	7.6%	245	288.3	288.8	293.01	296.4	326.9	379.9		
Green	Alex Arthur	5.5%	178	180.5	181.06	182.06	188.3	231.3			
Liberal Democrats	Jenny Wilson	4.1%	133	134.3	134.5	137.5	142.6				
UKIP	Stephen Adams	1.6%	53	53.9	54.02	60.03					
National Front	Dave MacDonald	0.9%	29	29.3	29.3						
Electorate: TBC Valid: 3,217 Spoilt: 133 Quota: 805 Turnout: 3,350 (36.4%)

=== Midstocket/Rosemount ===
- 2012: 1xCons; 1xSNP; 1xLab
- 2017: 1xCons; 1xSNP; 1xLab
- 2012–2017 Change: No change

Midstocket/Rosemount – 3 seats
Party	Candidate	FPv%	Count						
Party	Candidate	FPv%	1	2	3	4	5	6	7
Conservative	Tom Mason	27.7%	1,318						
SNP	Bill Cormie (incumbent)	25.1%	1,195						
Labour	Jenny Laing (incumbent)‡	19.7%	935	960.05	960.4	971.05	1,040.2	1,154.2	1,283.3
SNP	Derek Davidson	8.4%	398	399.2	403.8	403.8	491.1	524.9	604.5
Independent	Dustin MacDonald	6.5%	311	323.8	323.9	379.3	419.7	492.4	
Green	Alex Jarvis	5.4%	256	260.5	260.8	268.4			
Liberal Democrats	William Sell	5.2%	245	270.01	272.1	292.9	332.05		
Independent	Bill Robb	2%	97	117.4	117.5				
Electorate: TBC Valid: 4,755 Spoilt: 80 Quota: 1,189 Turnout: 4,835 (44.3%)

=== George Street/Harbour ===
- 2012: 2xLab; 1xSNP
- 2017: 2xSNP; 1xLab; 1xCons
- 2012–2017 Change: +1 Cons; +1 SNP; −1 Lab; 1 extra seat compared to 2012.

George Street/Harbour – 4 seats
Party	Candidate	FPv%	Count								
Party	Candidate	FPv%	1	2	3	4	5	6	7	8	9
SNP	Dell Henrickson	20.8%	753								
SNP	Michael Hutchison (incumbent)	17.4%	632	650.5	653.5	676.7	866.6				
Conservative	Ryan Houghton	16.2%	588	588.6	601.7	641.7	646.7	649.9	664.1	688.9	836.4
Labour	Sandra MacDonald‡	15%	545	545.9	549.9	578.9	582.9	596.8	864.2		
Green	Guy Ingerson	10%	364	365.04	366.04	425.1	440.3	489.7	500.2	534.8	
Labour	Mike Scott	8.1%	292	292.1	293.1	315.1	316.2	320.1			
SNP	Wendy Stuart	5.8%	210	215.4	216.5	222.5					
Liberal Democrats	John Waddell	5.7%	206	206.3	211.3						
UKIP	John Stephen	0.9%	32	32.1							
Electorate: TBC Valid: 3,622 Spoilt: 103 Quota: 725 Turnout: 3,725 (30.5%)

=== Lower Deeside ===
- 2012: 1xIndependent; 1xLib Dem; 1xLab
- 2017: 1xCons; 1xLab; 1xIndependent
- 2012–2017 Change: − LibDem; +1 Con

Lower Deeside – 3 seats
Party	Candidate	FPv%	Count							
Party	Candidate	FPv%	1	2	3	4	5	6	7	8
Conservative	Philip Bell	39.8	2,714							
Independent	Marie Boulton (incumbent)	16.4	1,119	1,449.4	1,452.5	1,512	1,556.09	1,822.8		
Labour	M. Tauqeer Malik (incumbent)‡	15.3	1,040	1,155.5	1,165.09	1,211.1	1,241.6	1,447.9	1,497.3	1,976.8
SNP	Pamela McBain	15.1	1,028	1,042.9	1,049.4	1,068.8	1,145.9	1,224.4	1,235.1	
Liberal Democrats	Ken McLeod	7.9	541	743.6	751.9	770.7	816.04			
Green	Nir Oren	2.9	195	209.5	213.3	223.8				
Independent	Kenneth Pratt	2.1	143	202.9	205.7					
Scottish Libertarian	Robbie Bowman	0.5	31	45.9						
Electorate: TBC Valid: 6,811 Spoilt: 52 Quota: 1,703 Turnout: 6,863 (57.7%)

=== Hazlehead/Ashley/Queens Cross ===
- 2012 2xLDem; 1xCons; 1xSNP
- 2017 2xLDem; 1xCons; 1xSNP
- 2012–2017 Change: No change

Hazlehead/Ashley/Queens Cross – 4 seats
Party	Candidate	FPv%	Count				
Party	Candidate	FPv%	1	2	3	4	5
Liberal Democrats	Jennifer Stewart (incumbent) ‡	23.0	1,725				
Liberal Democrats	Martin Greig (incumbent)	21.2	1,592				
Conservative	Claire Imrie	17.7	1,326	1,380.5	1,395.4	1,448	2,614.1
Conservative	Steve Robertson	16.2	1,214	1,251.4	1,273.8	1,345.4	
SNP	John Cooke	16.1	1,210	1,239.9	1,251.8	1,371.9	1,396.4
Labour	John McLeod	5.9	441	470.2	481.1		
Electorate: TBC Valid: 7,508 Spoilt: 131 Quota: 1,502 Turnout: 7,639 (54.3%)

=== Airyhall/Broomhill/Garthdee ===
- 2012 1xLib Dem; 1xLab; 1xSNP
- 2017 1xLib Dem; 1xCons; 1xSNP
- 2012–2017 Change: −1 Lab; +1 Cons

Airyhall/Broomhill/Garthdee – 3 seats
Party	Candidate	FPv%	Count	
Party	Candidate	FPv%	1	2
Liberal Democrats	Ian Yuill (incumbent)	40.2	2,458	
Conservative	Douglas Lumsden	25.1	1,533	
SNP	Gordon Townson (incumbent)	23.2	1,417	1,596.7
Labour	Angela Taylor (incumbent)	11.6	708	1,076.8
Electorate: TBC Valid: 6,116 Spoilt: 54 Quota: 1,530 Turnout: 6,170 (51.9%)

=== Torry/Ferryhill ===
- 2012: 2xSNP; 1xLab; 1xCons
- 2017: 2xSNP; 1xLab; 1xCons
- 2012–2017 Change: No change

Torry/Ferryhill – 4 seats
Party	Candidate	FPv%	Count								
Party	Candidate	FPv%	1	2	3	4	5	6	7	8	9
Conservative	Alan Donnelly (incumbent)‡‡	26.1	1,337								
SNP	Christian Allard	17.8	910	913.6	914.6	920.7	963.9	988.4	1,013.4	1,037.7	1,159.3
SNP	Catriona MacKenzie‡‡‡‡‡	16.5	847	851.2	851.2	854.2	915.4	956.4	1,001.4	1,017.3	1,143.1
Labour	Yvonne Allan (incumbent)‡	16.5	843	873.7	873.7	881.4	908.9	989.7	1,324.2		
Independent	David Fryer	11.3	580	616.7	619.8	629.2	681.2	754.7	799.0	846.3	
Labour	Piotr Teodorowski	9.1	467	474.8	474.8	476.8	499.09	547.4			
Liberal Democrats	Gregor McAbery	5.6	286	332.7	333.7	340.01	377.5				
Green	Renée Slater	5.3	269	274.7	275.7	282.8					
UKIP	William McIntosh	1.0	49	65.7							
National Front	Billy Watson	0.2	10	10.5							
Electorate: TBC Valid: 5,598 Spoilt: 144 Quota: 1,120 Turnout: 5,742 (37.8%)

=== Kincorth/Nigg/Cove ===
- 2017: 2xSNP; 1xCons; 1xLab
- 2012–2017 Change: New ward

Kincorth/Nigg/Cove – 4 seats
Party	Candidate	FPv%	Count							
Party	Candidate	FPv%	1	2	3	4	5	6	7	8
SNP	Stephen Flynn *‡‡‡‡‡‡	27.0	1,396							
Conservative	Philip Sellar	21.5	1,113							
SNP	Alex Nicoll +	13.7	707	1,020.3	1,023.08	1,041.9				
Labour	Sarah Duncan‡	11.4	590	595.7	601.9	615.5	615.9	670.9	960.07	1,198.6
Independent	Andy Finlayson *	10.9	562	571.5	585.9	719.5	720.8	812.07	845.5	
Labour	Lynn Thomson	6.1	318	322.1	329.5	343.7	344.08	388.3		
Liberal Democrats	Cameron Finnie	5.2	270	273.09	286.2	305.3	305.9			
Independent	Finlay Crossan	4.3	220	224.1	232.9					
Electorate: TBC Valid: 5,176 Spoilt: 120 Quota: 1,036 Turnout: 5,296 (40.9%)

- = Sitting Councillors for Kincorth/Loirston Ward.

+ = Sitting Councillor for Midstocket/Rosemount Ward.

== Changes between 2017 and 2022 ==
=== ‡ Changes of affiliation ===
On 17 May 2017, Cllr Jennifer Stewart (Hazlehead/Ashley/Queens Cross) resigned from the Liberal Democrat group and now sits as an Independent.

On the same day, all 9 Labour councillors were suspended from the party and now sit as "Aberdeen Labour".

- ‡‡ On 10 January 2019 Cllr Alan Donnelly (Torry/Ferryhill) was suspended from membership of the Scottish Conservative Party following a sexual harassment complaint. He remained a member, and Depute Leader, of the Conservative Group on Aberdeen City Council until his conviction for sexual assault on 13 December 2019. He now sits as an Independent but is currently the subject of an interim suspension by the Standards Commission for Scotland.
- ‡‡‡ On 11 July 2019 Bridge of Don SNP Cllr Sandy Stuart died after a short illness. A by-election was held on 3 October 2019 for two seats. This was due to the resignation of fellow Bridge of Don Cllr Brett Hunt the day after the death of Cllr Stuart. The SNP candidate Jessica Mennie retained the seat for the party.
- ‡‡‡‡ On 12 July 2019 Conservative Cllr Brett Hunt resigned his seat as he works increasingly overseas. A by-election was held on 3 October 2019 for two seats. This was due to the death of fellow Bridge of Don Cllr Sandy Stuart the day before Cllr Brett Hunt's resignation. The Conservative candidate Sarah Cross retained the seat for the party.
- ‡‡‡‡‡ On 28 August 2019 Torry and Ferryhill SNP Cllr Catriona McKenzie resigned her seat due to changes in her personal life. A by-election was held on 21 November 2019 and Audrey Nicoll held the seat for the SNP.
- ‡‡‡‡‡‡ Kincorth/Nigg/Cove SNP Cllr Stephen Flynn was elected MP for Aberdeen South at the 2019 UK General Election. He resigned his Council seat on 4 March 2020 resulting in a by-election. This was scheduled for 5 November 2020 and was held by Miranda Radley for the SNP.

== By-elections since 2017 ==
Bridge of Don By-election (3 October 2019) – 2 Seats
Party	Candidate	FPv%	Count
Party	Candidate	FPv%	1
Conservative	Sarah Cross	36.2%	1,857
SNP	Jessica Mennie	35.0%	1,797
Liberal Democrats	Michael Skoczykloda	18.1%	929
Labour	Graeme Lawrence	5.9%	305
Green	Sylvia Hardie	2.7%	140
Independent	Simon McLean	0.8%	43
Red Party of Scotland	Max McKay	0.17%	9
Electorate: 15,188 Valid: 5,135 Spoilt: 66 Quota: 1,712 Turnout: 34.2%

Torry/Ferryhill By-election (21 November 2019)
Party	Candidate	FPv%	Count					
Party	Candidate	FPv%	1	2	3	4	5	6
SNP	Audrey Nicoll	43.2	1,618	1,620	1,624	1,673	1,819	1,989
Conservative	Neil Murray	26.0	972	983	996	1,049	1,083	1,151
Labour	Willie Young	10.6	395	396	402	462	533	
Liberal Democrats	Gregor McAbery	8.4	315	320	324			
Green	Betty Lyon	8.1	304	320	347	429		
Independent	Simon McLean	2.3	86	89				
UKIP	Roy Hill	1.4	53					
Electorate: 15,443 Valid: 3,743 Spoilt: 40 Quota: 1,872 Turnout: 3,783 (24.5%)

Kincorth/Nigg/Cove By-election (5 November 2020)
Party	Candidate	FPv%	Count							
Party	Candidate	FPv%	1	2	3	4	5	6	7	8
SNP	Miranda Radley	47.4	1,661	1,661	1,663	1,672	1,691	1,697	1,716	1,785
Conservative	Christopher Wyles	20.2	709	710	712	713	714	725	746	834
Labour	Shona Simpson	12.2	429	430	430	431	441	446	471	529
Independent	Andy Finlayson	10.5	367	368	368	374	383	419	451	
Liberal Democrats	Moira Henderson	3.6	128	132	132	133	140	148		
Independent	Simon McLean	2.5	92	93	97	99	104			
Green	Daniel Verhamme	1.7	58	60	61	63				
Independent	Lizette Belizzi Houston	0.9	31	32	34					
Independent	Sochima Iroh	0.5	16							
Scottish Libertarian	Bryce Hope	0.5	16							
Electorate: 13,130 Valid: 3,540 Spoilt: 33 Quota: 1,754 Turnout: 3,573 (27%)
