= Lower Deeside (ward) =

Council ward in Aberdeen, Scotland

- Aberdeen City Council
- Boundary of Lower Deeside in Aberdeen from 2017.
- Electorate: 12,555

Current ward
- Created: 2007
- Councillor: Marie Boulton (Independent)
- Councillor: Duncan Massey (Reform)
- Councillor: M. Tauqeer Malik (Labour)

Lower Deeside is one of the thirteen wards used to elect members of the Aberdeen City Council. It elects three Councillors.

== Councillors ==
Election	Councillors		
2007	Marie Boulton (Ind.)	Aileen Malone (Liberal Democrats)	Alan Milne (Conservative)
2012	Marie Boulton (Ind.)	Aileen Malone (Liberal Democrats)	M. Tauqeer Malik (Labour)
2017	Marie Boulton (Ind.)	Philip Bell (Conservative)	M. Tauqeer Malik (Labour)
2022	Marie Boulton (Ind.)	Duncan Massey (Conservative/Reform UK) (Note: Elected as Conservative councillor; defected to Reform UK in 2025.)	M. Tauqeer Malik (Labour)
2025	Marie Boulton (Ind.)	Duncan Massey (Conservative/Reform UK)	M. Tauqeer Malik (Labour)

|}

== Election results ==
=== 2022 election ===
Lower Deeside – 3 seats
Party	Candidate	FPv%	Count				
Party	Candidate	FPv%	1	2	3	4	5
Labour	M. Tauqeer Malik (incumbent)	23.8	1,640	1,698	1,804		
Independent	Marie Boulton (incumbent)	21.7	1,496	1,524	1,622	1,651	1,733
Conservative	Duncan Massey (Note: Cllr Massey defected to Reform UK in June 2025.)	17.3	1,194	1,197	1,232	1,242	2,009
SNP	Ewan Ritchie	15.3	1,051	1,192	1,234	1,247	1,252
Conservative	Gillian Tebberen	12.8	882	890	910	913	
Liberal Democrats	Sue Mulkerrin	4.6	316	363			
Green	Daniel Verhamme	4.5	307				
Electorate: 12,555 Valid: 6,886 Spoilt: 84 Quota: 1,722 Turnout: 55.5%

=== 2017 election ===
2017 Aberdeen City Council election

Lower Deeside – 3 seats
Party	Candidate	FPv%	Count							
Party	Candidate	FPv%	1	2	3	4	5	6	7	8
Conservative	Philip Bell	39.8	2,714							
Independent	Marie Boulton (incumbent)	16.4	1,119	1,449.4	1,452.5	1,512	1,556.09	1,822.8		
Labour	M. Tauqeer Malik (incumbent)‡	15.3	1,040	1,155.5	1,165.09	1,211.1	1,241.6	1,447.9	1,497.3	1,976.8
SNP	Pamela McBain	15.1	1,028	1,042.9	1,049.4	1,068.8	1,145.9	1,224.4	1,235.1	
Liberal Democrats	Ken McLeod	7.9	541	743.6	751.9	770.7	816.04			
Green	Nir Oren	2.9	195	209.5	213.3	223.8				
Independent	Kenneth Pratt	2.1	143	202.9	205.7					
Scottish Libertarian	Robbie Bowman	0.5	31	45.9						
Electorate: TBC Valid: 6,811 Spoilt: 52 Quota: 1,703 Turnout: 6,863 (57.7%)

=== 2012 election ===
2012 Aberdeen City Council election

Lower Deeside - 3 seats
Party	Candidate	FPv%	Count					
Party	Candidate	FPv%	1	2	3	4	5	6
Independent	Marie Boulton (incumbent)	30.7%	1,520					
Liberal Democrats	Aileen Malone (incumbent)	15.3%	755	814.2	823.4	992.7	1,140.9	1,539.9
Labour	M. Tauqeer Malik	15.0%	744	779	789.4	841.2	1,007.5	1,068.9
Conservative	Raymond Murchie	14.4%	712	741.4	754.5	881.8	950.2	
SNP	Dorothy Janet McCaig	13.3%	659	677.4	684.9	739.4		
Independent	Peter Reiss	9.9%	490	568.6	621.3			
Independent	Andy Anderson	1.3%	64	94.7				
Electorate: 11,301 Valid: 4,944 Spoilt: 33 Quota: 1,237 Turnout: 4,977 (43.75%)

=== 2007 election ===
2007 Aberdeen City Council election

Lower Deeside - 3 seats
Party	Candidate	FPv%	Count				
Party	Candidate	FPv%	1	2	3	4	5
Liberal Democrats	Aileen Malone	23.9	1,536	1,660			
Conservative	Alan Milne††††	24.0	1,546	1,588	1,592	1,745	
Independent	Marie Boulton	17.1	1,097	1,173	1,176	1,353	1,399
SNP	David Adams	16.6	1,068	1,125	1,127	1,234	1,253
Liberal Democrats	Brian Malone	9.4	603	692	726		
Labour	Marianne Stewart	9.1	583				
Electorate: Valid: 6,435 Spoilt: 69 Quota: 1,609 Turnout: 6,504
