= Duncan Massey =

Scottish politician

Duncan Massey MSP
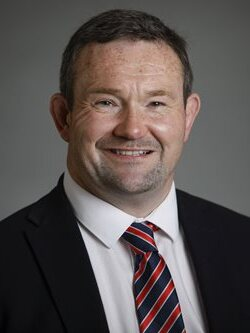
- Official Portrait, 2026

Member of the Scottish Parliament for North East Scotland (1 of 7 Regional MSPs)
- Incumbent
- Assumed office 7 May 2026

Convener of the Economy, Tourism and Energy Committee
- Incumbent
- Assumed office 10 June 2026

Personal details
- Party: Reform Party Scotland
- Other political affiliations: Scottish Conservatives (previously)

Duncan Massey is a Scottish politician who has served as a Member of the Scottish Parliament for North East Scotland since May 2026, and is the current convener of the Economy, Tourism and Energy Committee. He is a member of Reform Party Scotland.

== Biography ==
Massey previously served as a Conservative councillor on Aberdeen City Council. In the 2026 Scottish Parliament election, Massey stood as Reform's constituency candidate in Aberdeen Deeside and North Kincardine, where he placed third. He was elected on the regional list for North East Scotland.

Massey is convener of the Economy, Tourism and Energy Committee.
