= Douglas Lumsden =

Scottish Conservative politician (born 1971)

Douglas Lumsden MP
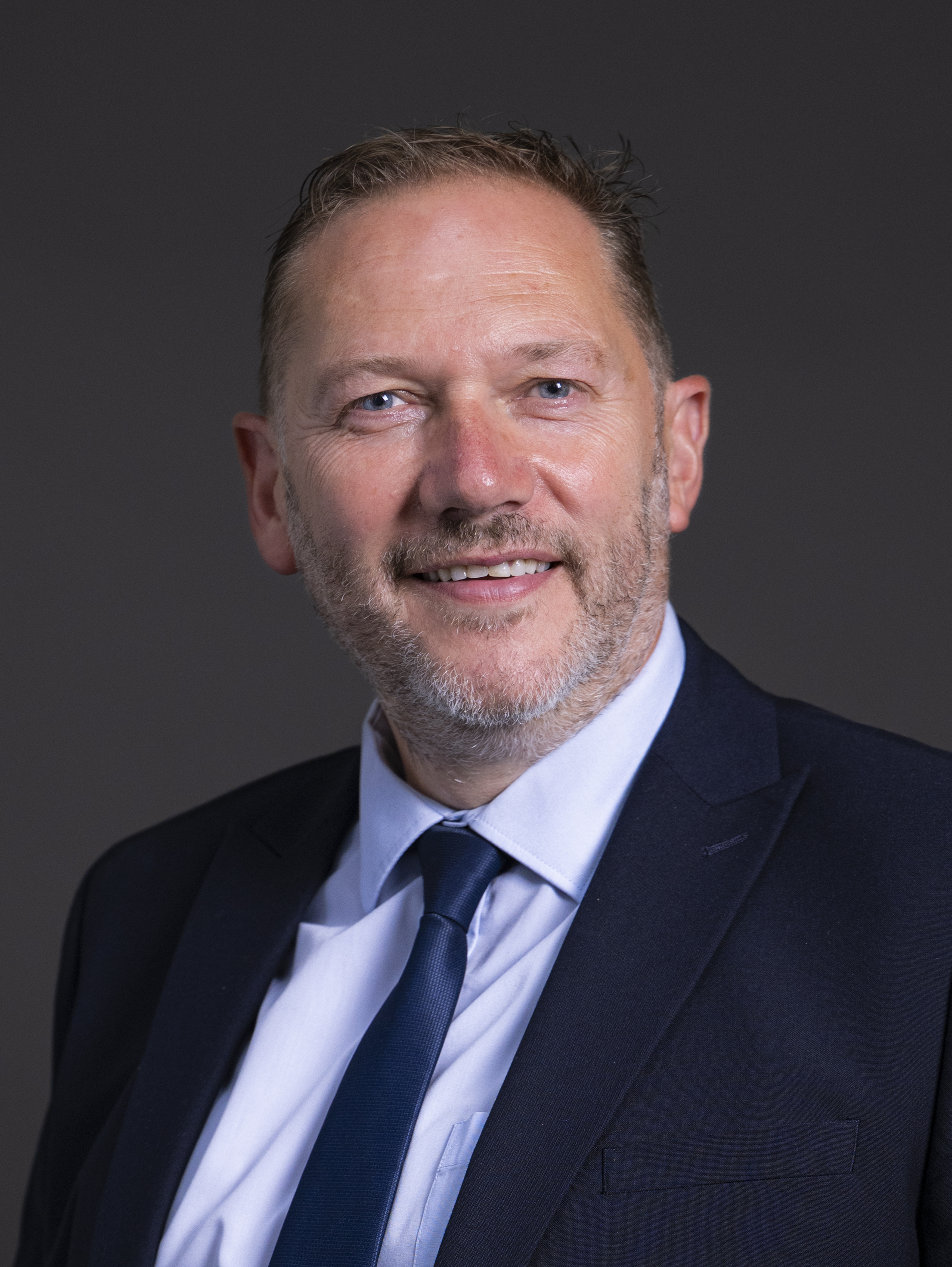
- Official portrait, 2026

Member of Parliament for Aberdeen South
- Incumbent
- Assumed office 18 June 2026
- Preceded by: Stephen Flynn
- Majority: 6,050 (20.9%)

Member of the Scottish Parliament for North East Scotland (1 of 7 Regional MSPs)
- In office 6 May 2021 – 23 June 2026
- Preceded by: Multi-member constituency
- Succeeded by: James Adams

Personal details
- Born: Douglas Aaron Lumsden; 31 August 1971 (age 55) Aberdeen, Scotland
- Party: Scottish Conservatives
- Education: Robert Gordon University (BEng)
- Website: douglaslumsden.org.uk

Douglas Aaron Lumsden (born 31 August 1971) is a Scottish Conservative Party politician, and MP for Aberdeen South. He was a Member of the Scottish Parliament (MSP) for the North East Scotland region from 2021 to 2026. He was previously the co-leader of Aberdeen City Council.

== Early life and education ==
Douglas was born in Aberdeen on 31 August 1971, to Douglas and June Lumsden. He was educated at Aberdeen Grammar School and Robert Gordon University, where he studied electronic and electrical engineering where he secured an ordinary degree.

== Career ==
Lumsden worked in the IT industry from 1993 to 2017. It was in 2017 that he was first elected to Aberdeen City Council, as one of three councillors representing the Airyhall/Broomhill/Garthdee ward. He was co-leader of the council from 2017 until 2021. Lumsden contested the Aberdeen South seat at the 2019 United Kingdom general election and came second.

In December 2020, Lumsden planned to ask the UK government to fund Aberdeen Council directly, bypassing the Scottish government. He was criticised by the Scottish National Party and Liberal Democrats for disrespecting Scottish devolution; however, the Liberal Democrats also criticised the Scottish government for giving Aberdeen "a horrible and unfair deal on funding". Lumsden claimed that his concern was that "lobbying the Scottish Government and COSLA (Convention of Scottish Local Authorities) for a fairer funding settlement" has not been taken seriously.

=== Member of the Scottish Parliament ===
At the 2021 Scottish Parliament election, Lumsden was the Conservative candidate for the Aberdeen Central constituency, finishing second with 24.09% of the vote. He was appointed as a regional member on the North East Scotland list.

On 12 January 2022, Lumsden called for Boris Johnson to resign as party leader and Prime Minister over the Westminster lockdown parties controversy, along with a majority of Scottish Conservative MSPs.

Lumsden remained a councillor and continued to draw both salaries after his election to Holyrood in order to avoid the expense of a by-election. He did not stand at the 2022 Aberdeen City Council election.

At the 2026 Scottish Parliament election, Lumsden contested the Aberdeenshire East constituency and came second, though was then elected on the regional list for North East Scotland.

==== Parliamentary written questions ====
On 8 February 2025, John Boothman, political correspondent for The Sunday Times, reported that Lumsden had submitted nearly 1,000 written questions to the Scottish government in the month of January 2025 alone. It was speculated that AI was used to generate the questions including ones on flagpoles, lightbulbs, deckchairs, jars of honey in the gift shop, and the cost of electric hand dryers. Lumsden denied using AI to generate questions but added that he "would look at any new tools to hold the government to account."

According to the Daily Record, the 987 questions made up more than half of the total questions submitted by all 129 MSPs. Dealing with the questions was estimated to have cost the Scottish Government and taxpayer approximately £100,000.

In his defence, Lumsden said that "It's legitimate to submit questions to scrutinise the SNP government and Scottish parliament, but I will speak with my team about the volume and if a written question is needed in every instance." Lumsden claimed, "I will continue to ask questions to hold this rotten government to account and won't be silenced when it comes to standing up for the northeast." His holding the government to account included queries about the number of salt and pepper sachets at Holyrood and how it is verified that the beeswax used for the Great Seal of Scotland comes from the parliament's bees. Lumsden commented that "these questions have discovered that there has been no growth of surgical training posts in the last 10 years, no forensic pathologists based in Aberdeen, and the incident statistics on the A96." Lumsden did not apologise or react to calls for him to pay for the costs his questions caused.

=== Member of the United Kingdom Parliament ===
Following Stephen Flynn's election to the Scottish Parliament in the 2026 Scottish Parliament election, it was announced that Lumsden would be contesting the 2026 Aberdeen South by-election which he won. James Adams succeeded him as an MSP. He was sworn in as a member of Parliament on 22 June 2026. On 6 July 2026, he replaced Jack Rankin on the Scottish Affairs Select Committee.

Parliament of the United Kingdom
Preceded by Stephen Flynn	Member of Parliament for Aberdeen South; 2026–present	Incumbent
