= Christian Allard =

French-born Scottish politician

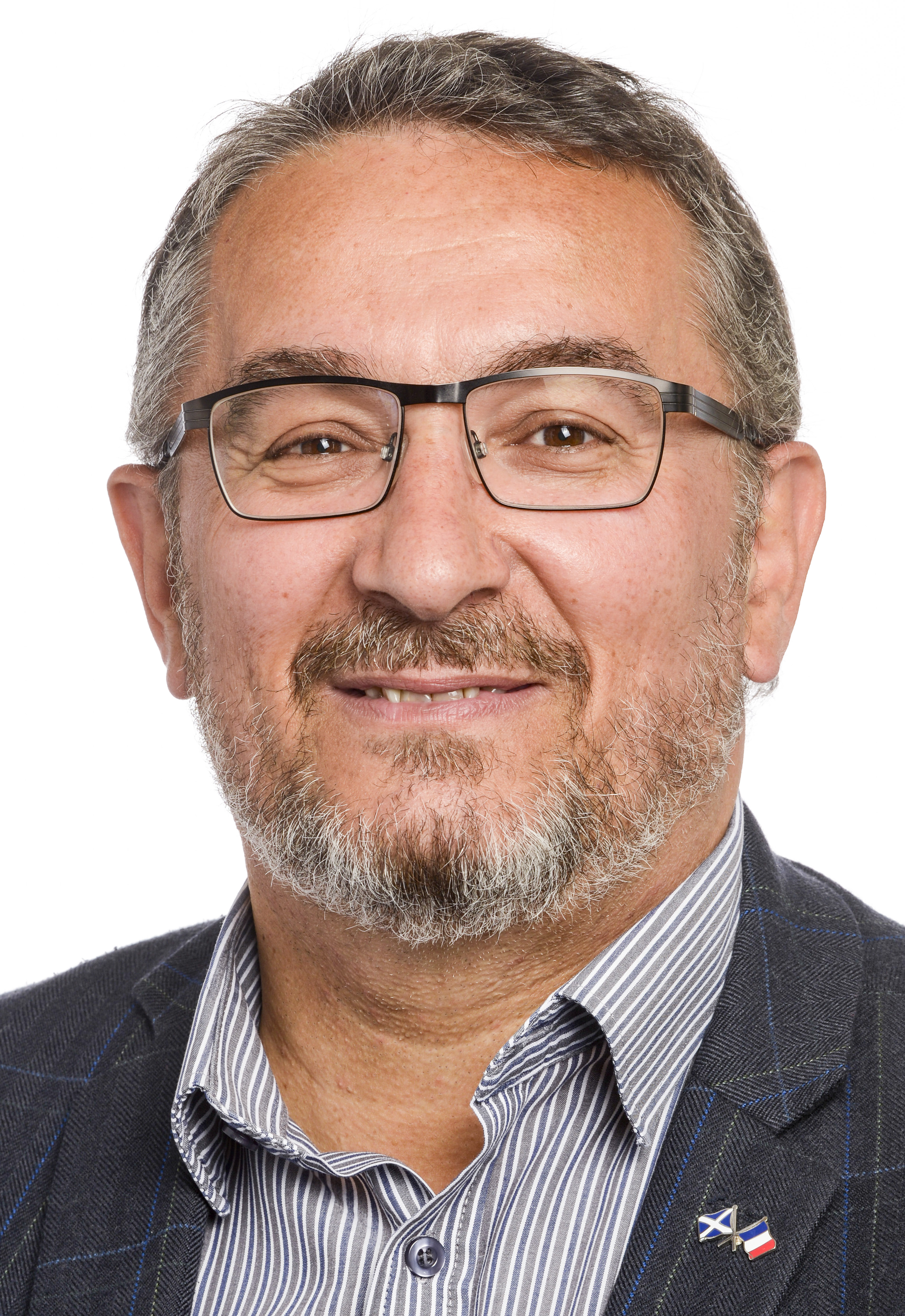

Member of the European Parliament for Scotland
- In office 2 July 2019 – 31 January 2020
- Preceded by: Ian Hudghton
- Succeeded by: Constituency abolished

Member of the Scottish Parliament for North East Scotland
- In office 15 May 2013 – 24 March 2016
- Preceded by: Mark McDonald

Personal details
- Born: 31 March 1964 (age 62) Dijon, Côte-d'Or, France
- Party: Scottish National Party
- Children: 3

Christian Allard (born 31 March 1964) is a French citizen and a Scottish politician. Allard was elected as a Scottish National Party (SNP) Member of the European Parliament (MEP) for Scotland constituency in the 2019 European Parliament election, serving until the 31 January 2020 when the Brexit process was completed. He is also a former Member of the Scottish Parliament (MSP) for the North East Scotland region 2013−2016 and has been a councillor for Aberdeen City Council since 2017.

== Background ==
Allard was born in 1964 in Dijon, France. He first came to Scotland around 1986, when he accepted the offer from a European seafood transport and logistics network (Tradimar/STEF) to open an office in Glasgow. After marrying a Scot, he later moved to the North East to work for a seafood exporting company. He worked in the fishing industry for over 30 years.

== Political career ==
Allard joined the SNP around 2004. His belief that Scotland could and should be an independent country was shaped by his experiences in the fishing industry.

At the 2011 Scottish Parliament election, Allard stood on the party list for the North East Scotland region, though did not win a seat.

Allard worked part-time as a constituency assistant to Dennis Robertson MSP, and was a key part of Mr Robertson’s successful 2011 campaign team in Aberdeenshire West.

=== Member of the Scottish Parliament ===
In preparation for the 2013 Aberdeen Donside by-election, Mark McDonald resigned his list seat, leaving a vacancy in the North East region. As a result, Allard was chosen to be McDonald's successor in the region. His swearing into the Scottish Parliament was conducted in both English and French, the first time that the latter language has been used for the purpose.

Allard stood for re-election in 2016, and topped the SNP's regional list in the North East region. The SNP won a majority of the constituency seats in the North East, and were not entitled to representation on the list, with Allard losing his seat as a result.

=== Subsequent political activity ===
Allard stood for election at the 2017 Aberdeen City Council election for the Torry/Ferryhill ward and took the 3rd seat with 910 1st preference votes.

Allard was elected as a Member of the European Parliament for the Scotland constituency in the 2019 European Parliament election. He served as MEP until the 31 January 2020, when the Brexit process was completed.

At the 2021 Scottish Parliament election, he was the second list candidate for the SNP in the North East. The party received 147,910 list votes (40.9%), but were again unsuccessful in winning any regional seats.

== Personal life ==
Allard has raised three daughters in Scotland, and also now has seven grandchildren.

== See also ==
- Alyn Smith
- Aileen McLeod
- Heather Anderson
