= Marie Boulton =

Scottish politician

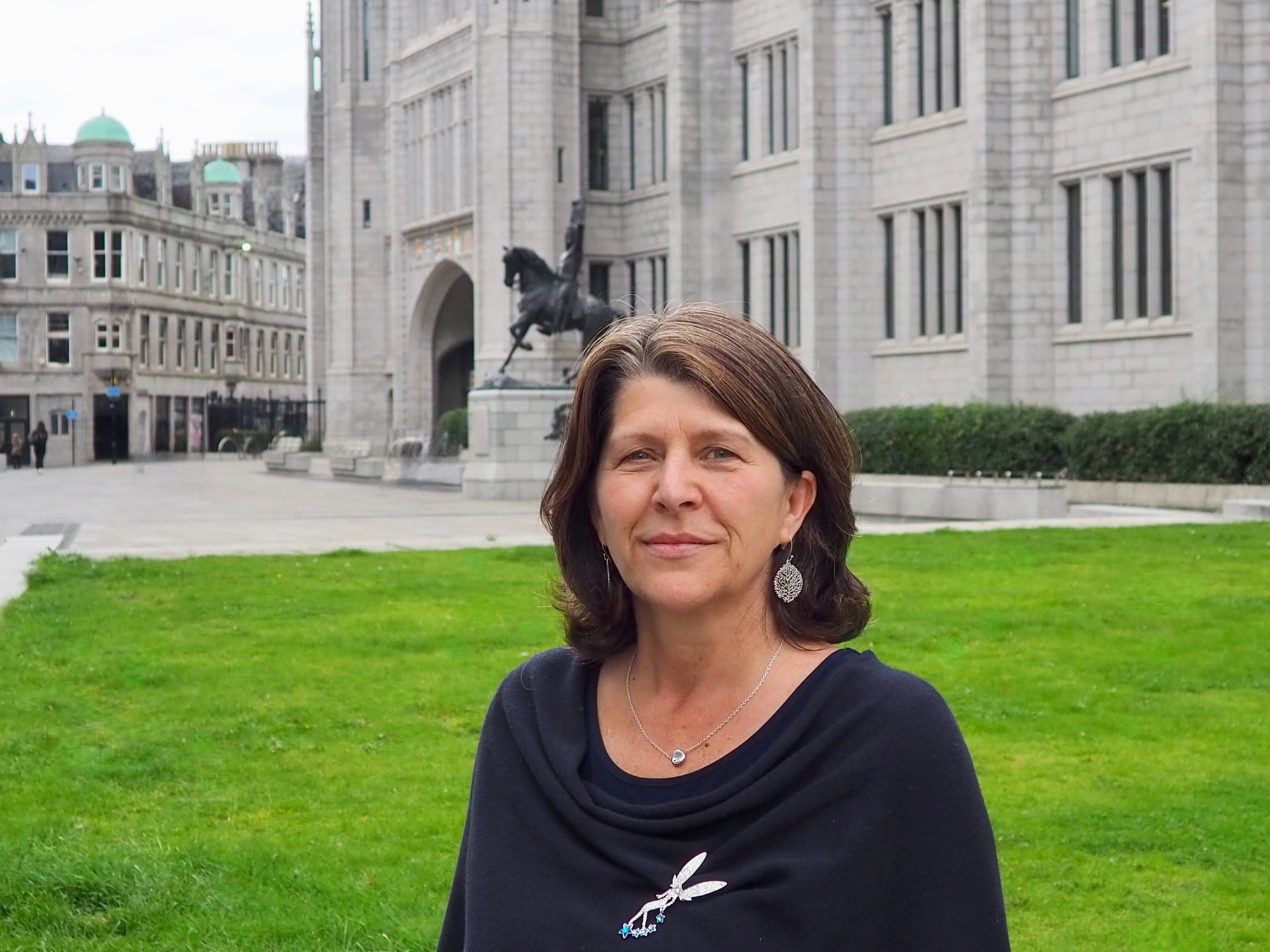
- Boulton in 2023

Councillor for Lower Deeside on Aberdeen City Council
- Incumbent
- Assumed office 4 May 2007
- Preceded by: Ward created

Deputy Leader of Aberdeen City Council
- In office 3 May 2012 – 5 May 2017

Personal details
- Born: March 1967 (age 59) Scotland
- Party: Independent
- Education: Cults Academy, Aberdeen

Marie Louise Boulton (born March 1967) is a British politician who has served as a councillor in Aberdeen, Scotland since 2007. Elected as Aberdeen City Council’s first independent councillor, Marie Boulton has represented Aberdeen's Lower Deeside Ward since 2007. She served her first term in opposition before becoming Deputy Leader of Aberdeen City Council upon her re-election in 2012, forming a coalition with Labour and the Conservatives. She held this post until 2017. Following the 2017 Local Elections she became Masterplan Spokesperson as part of the Labour, Conservative and Independent Administration and was Convenor of both the Licensing Board and Capital Programme Committee.

Following her re-election in 2022, Boulton returned to the opposition on Aberdeen City Council as the SNP and Liberal Democrats took control of the council. She continues to sit on a range of committees including the planning and licensing committees.
