= Glen Sannox =

Glen Sannox may refer to:

- A glen on the Isle of Arran, running from Goat Fell to the village of Sannox
- MV Glen Sannox (1957), a car and passenger ferry serving Clyde routes between 1957 and 1989
- MV Glen Sannox (2017), a dual-fuel ferry operating on the Arran route
