= Aberdeen City Council =

Unitary authority council in Aberdeen, Scotland

Aberdeen City Council Comhairle Baile Obar Dheathain
- Coat of arms

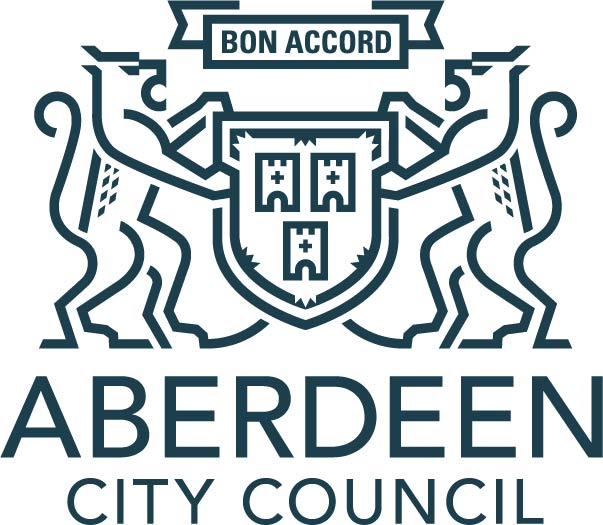
- Council logo since 2018

Type
- Type: Unitary authority

History
- Founded: 1996
- Preceded by: City of Aberdeen District Council (1975-1996); Aberdeen Corporation (pre-1153–1975)

Leadership
- Lord Provost: David Cameron, SNP since 18 May 2022
- Co-leader: Christian Allard, SNP since 23 May 2023
- Co-leader: Ian Yuill, Liberal Democrat since 18 May 2022
- Chief Executive: Andy MacDonald since October 2026

Structure
- Seats: 45 councillors
- Graph of the party split among 45 seats.
- Political groups: Administration (23) SNP (20) Liberal Democrats (3) Other parties (22) Labour (11) Conservative (6) Reform (1) Independent (4)

Elections
- Voting system: Single transferable vote
- Last election: 5 May 2022
- Next election: 6 May 2027

Meeting place
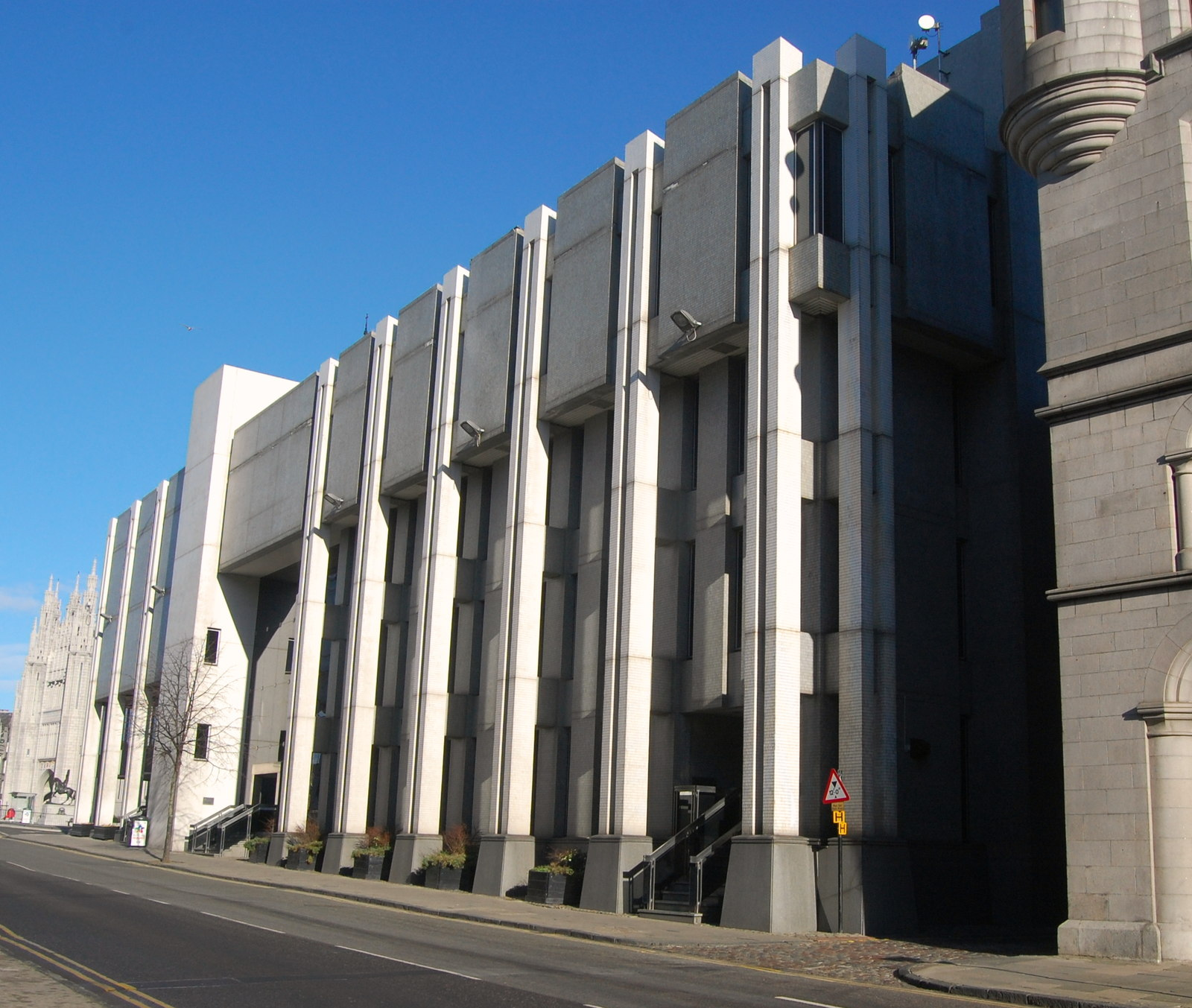
- Town House, Broad Street, Aberdeen, AB10 1FY

Website
- www.aberdeencity.gov.uk

Aberdeen City Council (Scottish Gaelic: Comhairle Baile Obar Dheathain) is the local authority for Aberdeen City, one of the 32 council areas of Scotland. In its modern form it was created in 1996. Aberdeen was formerly governed by a corporation from when it was made a burgh in the twelfth century until 1975. Between 1975 and 1996 the city was governed by City of Aberdeen District Council, a lower-tier authority within the Grampian region.

The council has been under no overall control since 2002. Since 2022 it has been led by a Scottish National Party and Liberal Democrat coalition. It meets at Aberdeen Town House and has its main offices at the neighbouring Marischal College.

== History ==
=== Aberdeen Corporation ===
Aberdeen was made a royal burgh by David I (reigned 1124–1153). The burgh of Aberdeen was governed by a corporation, also known as the town council. Elections for the council were only introduced in 1833. Prior to that the council was not an elected body; when vacancies arose the existing council appointed successors. As Aberdeen grew, the council's powers were inadequate to cater for the needs of the growing urban area. A separate police commission was established in 1795 with powers to levy taxes and provide infrastructure ('police' in this context being its older meaning of civic government rather than law enforcement). The first police commission was short-lived, but it was resurrected in 1818 after the town council went bankrupt in 1817. From 1818 until 1871 there was a dual system of local government, with the town council and police commission having different roles in Aberdeen's administration. The police commission was eventually abolished in 1871 and its functions absorbed by the town council.

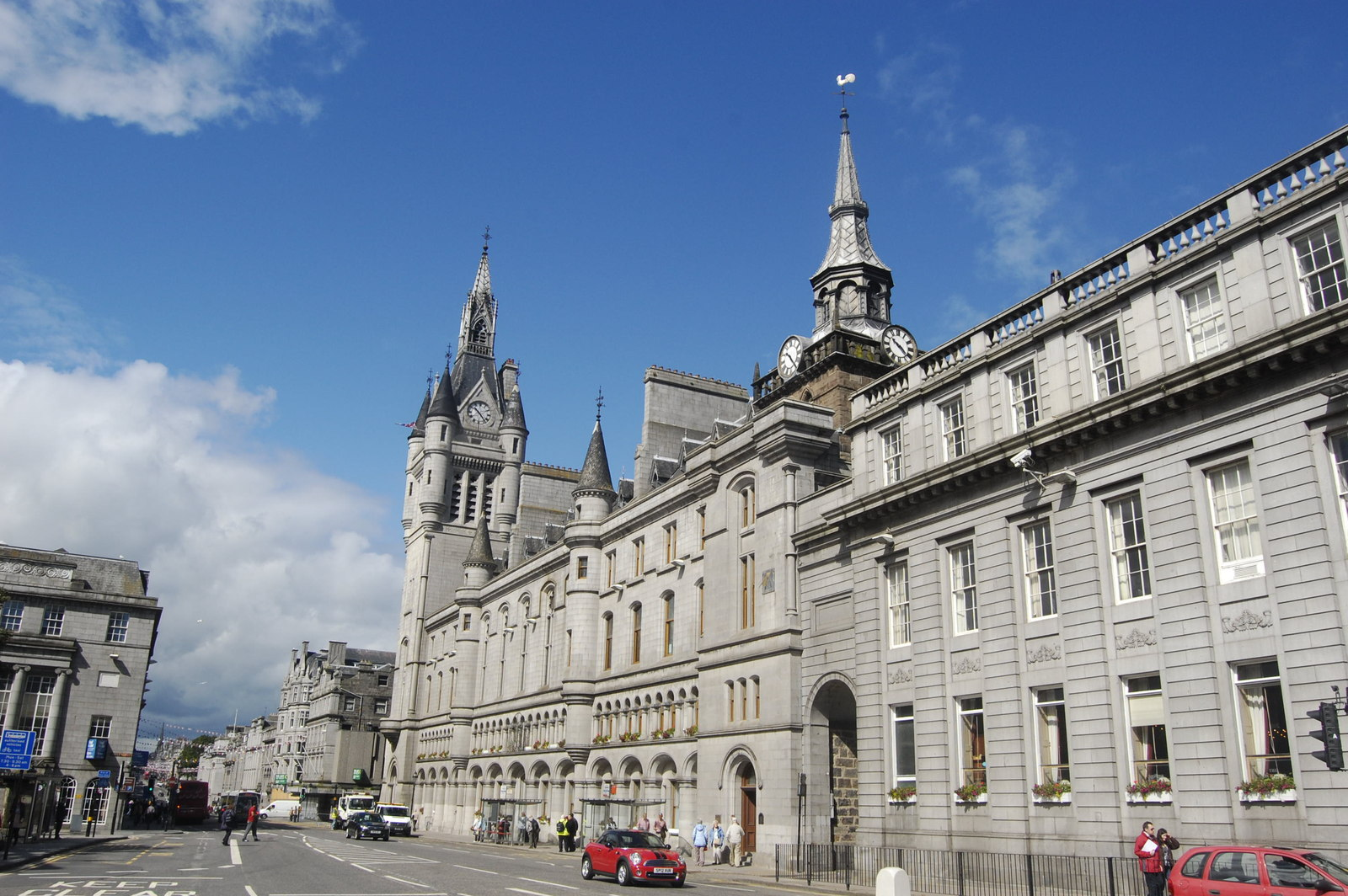
Aberdeen Town House, built for the corporation in 1874

Aberdeen was historically part of Aberdeenshire, but the functions affecting the burgh which operated at county level were relatively few, largely being limited to judicial functions and lieutenancy. When elected county councils were created in 1890 under the Local Government (Scotland) Act 1889, Aberdeen Corporation was deemed capable of running county-level local government functions, and so the burgh was excluded from the area administered by Aberdeenshire County Council.

In 1891 Aberdeen's boundaries were significantly enlarged, absorbing the neighbouring burghs of Old Aberdeen and Woodside, plus the Torry area on the south bank of the River Dee. The act of parliament which expanded the burgh also confirmed that Aberdeen was entitled to be called a city; it had commonly been described as a city prior to that, but (like most Scottish cities) without official recognition.

The historic county boundary between Aberdeenshire and Kincardineshire in this area followed the River Dee. Following the absorption of Torry on the south bank of the river in 1891, the city straddled the two counties. Aberdeen was made a county of itself in 1899, removing the city from the two counties for lieutenancy and other purposes as well as local government functions. The city boundaries were subsequently enlarged several times, gaining further territory from both Aberdeenshire and Kincardineshire, notably in 1935, 1952 and 1970.

=== City of Aberdeen District Council ===
Local government across Scotland was reorganised in 1975 under the Local Government (Scotland) Act 1973, which replaced the counties, burghs and landward districts with a two-tier system of regions and districts. One of the districts was called 'City of Aberdeen', which formed part of Grampian Region. City of Aberdeen District Council was therefore a lower-tier district authority, with upper-tier regional functions being provided by Grampian Regional Council.

The City of Aberdeen district covered a larger area than the pre-1975 city, taking in the parishes of Dyce, Newhills, Old Machar, and Peterculter from Aberdeenshire and Nigg from Kincardineshire. All except Dyce had previously ceded territory to the city in pre-1975 boundary changes. The parish of Nigg added in 1975 just covered the residual rural parts of the old parish around Cove Bay; Nigg village itself had been absorbed into the city in 1935. The parish of Old Machar was named after St Machar's Cathedral in Old Aberdeen, which had been absorbed into the city in 1891; the parish of Old Machar that was absorbed in 1975 was just the residual part of the cathedral's old parish which lay north of the River Don, including Bridge of Don.

=== Aberdeen City Council ===
Local government was reorganised again in 1996 under the Local Government etc. (Scotland) Act 1994, which abolished the regions and districts created in 1975 and established 32 single-tier council areas across Scotland. The existing City of Aberdeen District became one of the new council areas. The 1994 Act named the new council area 'City of Aberdeen', but this was changed to 'Aberdeen City' by a council resolution on 9 May 1995, before the new council area came into force, allowing the new council to take the name 'Aberdeen City Council'.

== Political control ==
The council has been under no overall control since 2002. Following the 2022 election a Scottish National Party and Liberal Democrats coalition took control of the council.

The first election to the City of Aberdeen District Council was held in 1974, initially operating as a shadow authority alongside the outgoing authorities until the new system came into force on 16 May 1975. A shadow authority was again elected in 1995 ahead of the change to council areas which came into force on 1 April 1996. Political control since 1975 has been as follows:

City of Aberdeen District Council

Party in control	Years
Labour	1975–1977
No overall control	1977–1980
Labour	1980–1996

Aberdeen City Council

Party in control	Years
Labour	1996–2002
No overall control	2002–present

=== Leadership ===
The role of Lord Provost of Aberdeen is largely ceremonial. They chair full council meetings and act as the council's civic figurehead. Political leadership is provided by the leader of the council. The leaders since 1996 have been:

Councillor	Party	From	To	Notes
Margaret Smith	Labour	1 Apr 1996	May 1999	
Len Ironside	Labour	13 May 1999	14 May 2003	
Kate Dean	Liberal Democrats	14 May 2003	1 Aug 2009	
John Stewart	Liberal Democrats	1 Aug 2009	29 Jun 2011	
Callum McCaig	SNP	29 Jun 2011	May 2012	
Barney Crockett	Labour	16 May 2012	14 May 2014	
Jenny Laing	Labour	14 May 2014	23 Aug 2017	
Jenny Laing (Note: On forming a coalition with the Conservatives in May 2017, all nine members of Aberdeen's Labour group were suspended from the national Labour Party. As such they became nominally independent councillors, but chose to continue to form a political group, called "Aberdeen Labour".)	Aberdeen Labour	23 Aug 2017	13 May 2021	Co-leaders
Douglas Lumsden	Conservative	23 Aug 2017	13 May 2021	Co-leaders
Jenny Laing	Aberdeen Labour	13 May 2021	5 May 2022	
Alex Nicoll	SNP	18 May 2022	23 May 2023	Co-leaders
Ian Yuill	Liberal Democrats	18 May 2022	23 May 2023	Co-leaders
Christian Allard	SNP	23 May 2023		Co-leaders
Ian Yuill	Liberal Democrats	23 May 2023		Co-leaders

=== Composition ===
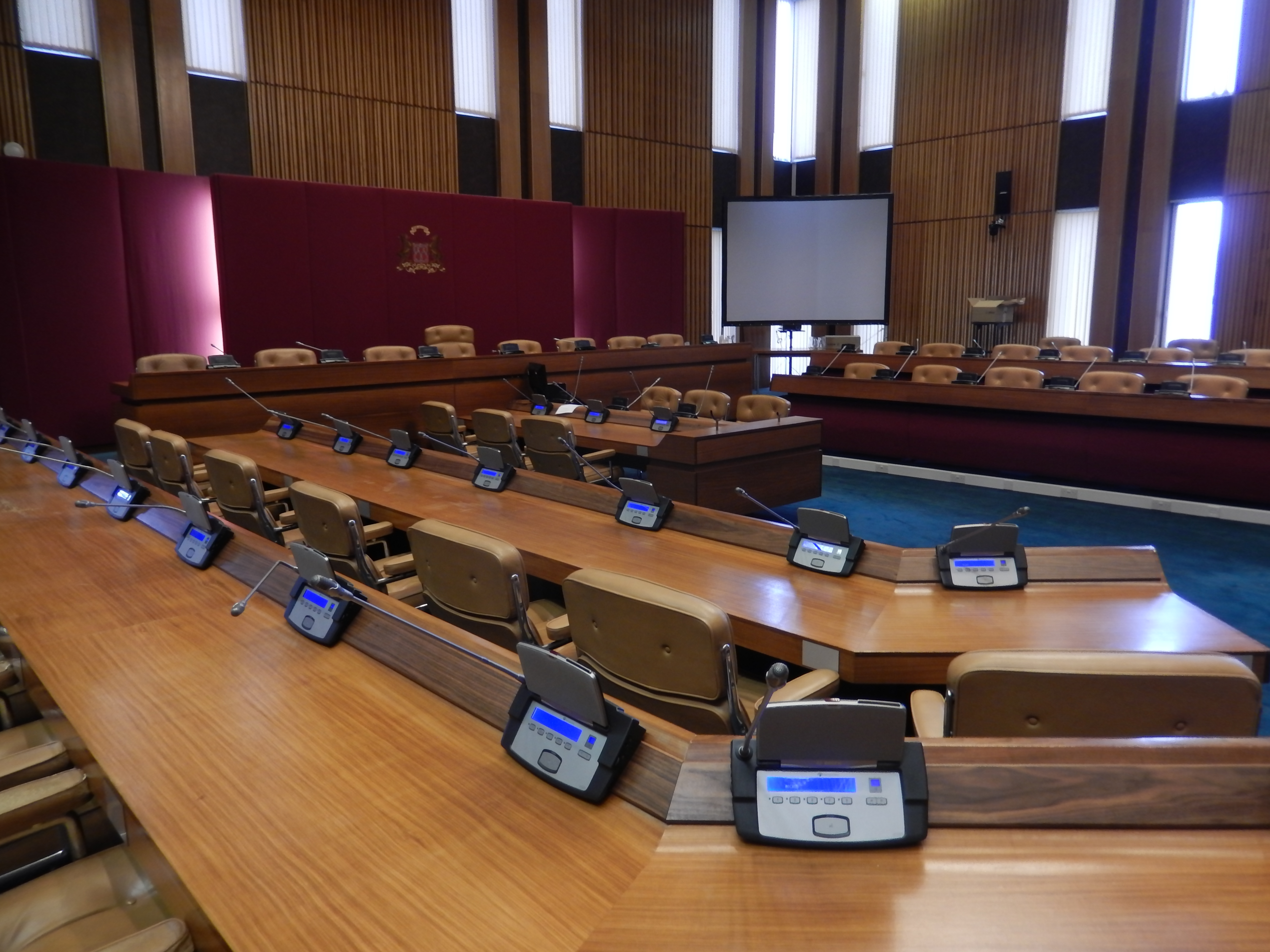
Aberdeen City Council Chamber

Aberdeen City Council currently comprises 45 councillors, who represent the city's wards, and is headed by the Lord Provost. Prior to the 2012 council election there were 43 members of Aberdeen City Council.

Between 2003 and 2007, the council was under the control of a Liberal Democrat and Conservative coalition, holding 23 of the 43 seats on the council. Prior to the 2003 election, the council had been considered a Labour stronghold. Following the May 2007 election, contested for the first time using a system of proportional representation, the Liberal Democrats and Scottish National Party (SNP) formed a coalition to run the council, holding 27 of the 43 seats (following an SNP by election gain from the Conservatives on 16 August 2007, the coalition held 28 of the 43 seats). Two Liberal Democrat councillors became independents during this period due to personal controversies, while the four strong Conservative group split in August 2010, with two councillors forming the Scottish Conservative Group and two others the Aberdeen Conservative Group.

After the May 2012 election, the control of the council shifted back to the Labour Party, supported in a coalition by three Conservative and three Independent councillors, giving the administration 23 seats.

The Labour/Conservative/Independent coalition continued after the 2017 election, but with a change in the balance of power within the coalition. Labour were reduced to nine councillors (subsequently suspended from membership by the Scottish Labour Party for forming a coalition with the Conservatives), whilst the Conservatives had eleven councillors elected. These Conservative and suspended "Aberdeen Labour" councillors were joined in coalition by three Independent councillors, one of who had left the Liberal Democrats just days after the council election.

In December 2019 a councillor elected as a Conservative became an independent following his conviction for sexual assault. This led to the ruling coalition becoming a minority administration comprising only 22 of the 45 councillors.

Between 2017 and 2021 the council had Co-Leaders Douglas Lumsden (Conservative) and Jenny Laing (“Aberdeen Labour”) as a result of the coalition agreement. Following Douglas Lumsden's election to the Scottish Parliament in May 2021 Jenny Laing became sole Leader of the council.

After the 2022 election the SNP and Liberal Democrats agreed to form a partnership to lead the Council for the next five years. At the Council's statutory meeting on 18 May 2022, SNP councillor David Cameron was elected Lord Provost and Liberal Democrat Councillor Steve Delaney was elected Depute Provost. SNP Group Leader Alex Nicoll and Liberal Democrat Group Leader Ian Yuill became Co-Leaders of the Council.

Following the 2022 election and a subsequent by-elections and changes of allegiance up to October 2026, the composition of the council was:

Party	Seats
SNP	20
Labour	11
Conservative	6
Liberal Democrats	3
Reform	1
Independent	4
Total	45

The next election is due in 2027.

== Premises ==
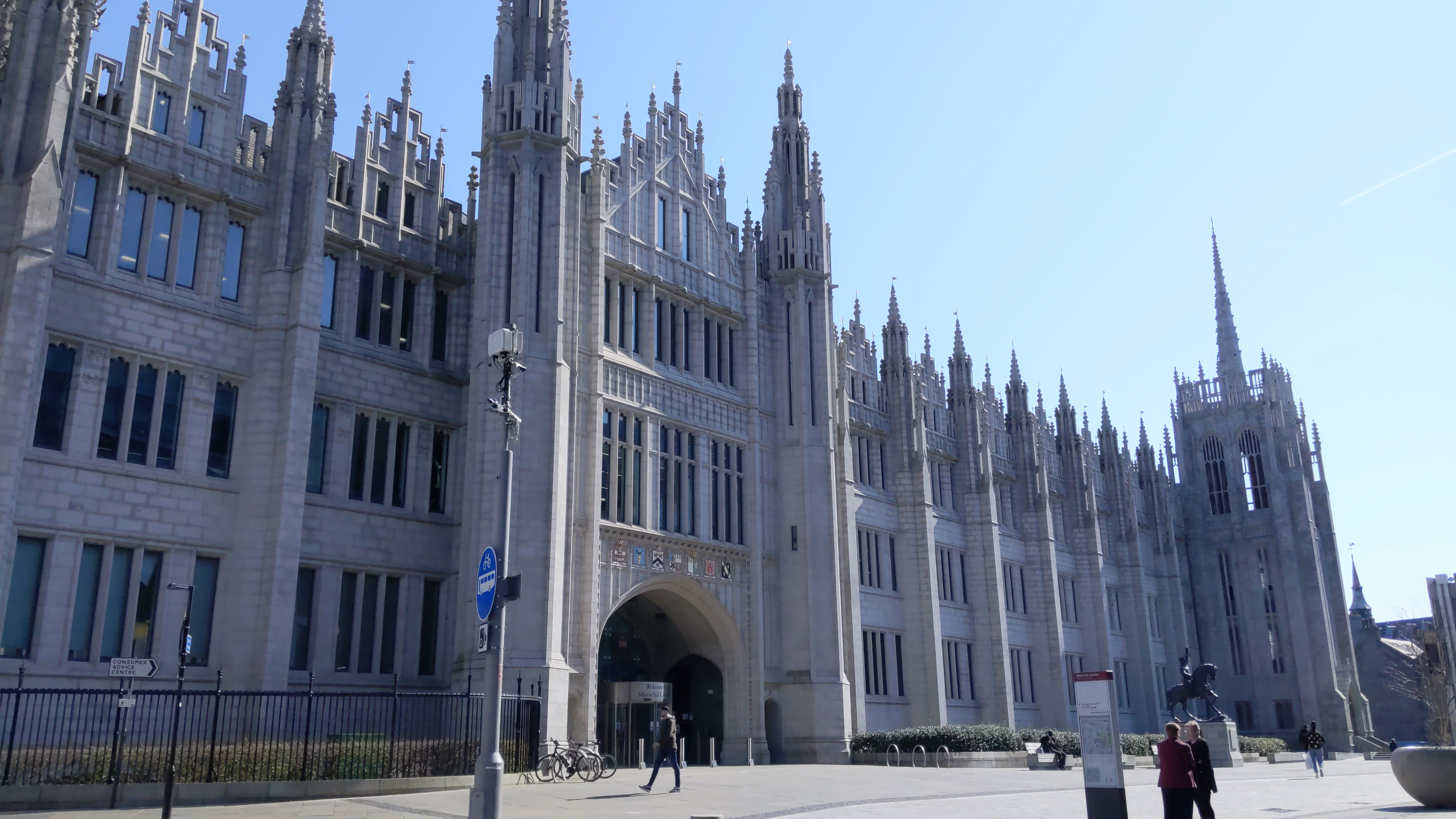
Marischal College: Council's main offices.

Council meetings are held at Aberdeen Town House on Broad Street, which was built in 1874 and substantially extended in 1975, including a new council chamber. The council's main offices are now in the neighbouring Marischal College. The council moved into the renovated former college building in 2011.

== Council structure ==
Before May 2007, councillors represented 43 single-member wards election on a first-past-the-post basis.

On 3 May 2007, the single transferable vote system was used for the first time and multi-member wards were introduced, each ward electing three or four councillors. The Local Government Boundary Commission for Scotland completed its final recommendations for new wards for all the council areas of Scotland.

Aberdeen is divided into 13 multi-member wards, electing a total of 45 councillors. This system was introduced as a result of the Local Governance (Scotland) Act 2004, and is designed to produce a form of proportional representation.

=== Current multi-member ward system ===
As of 4 May 2017, the current wards and representative numbers are:

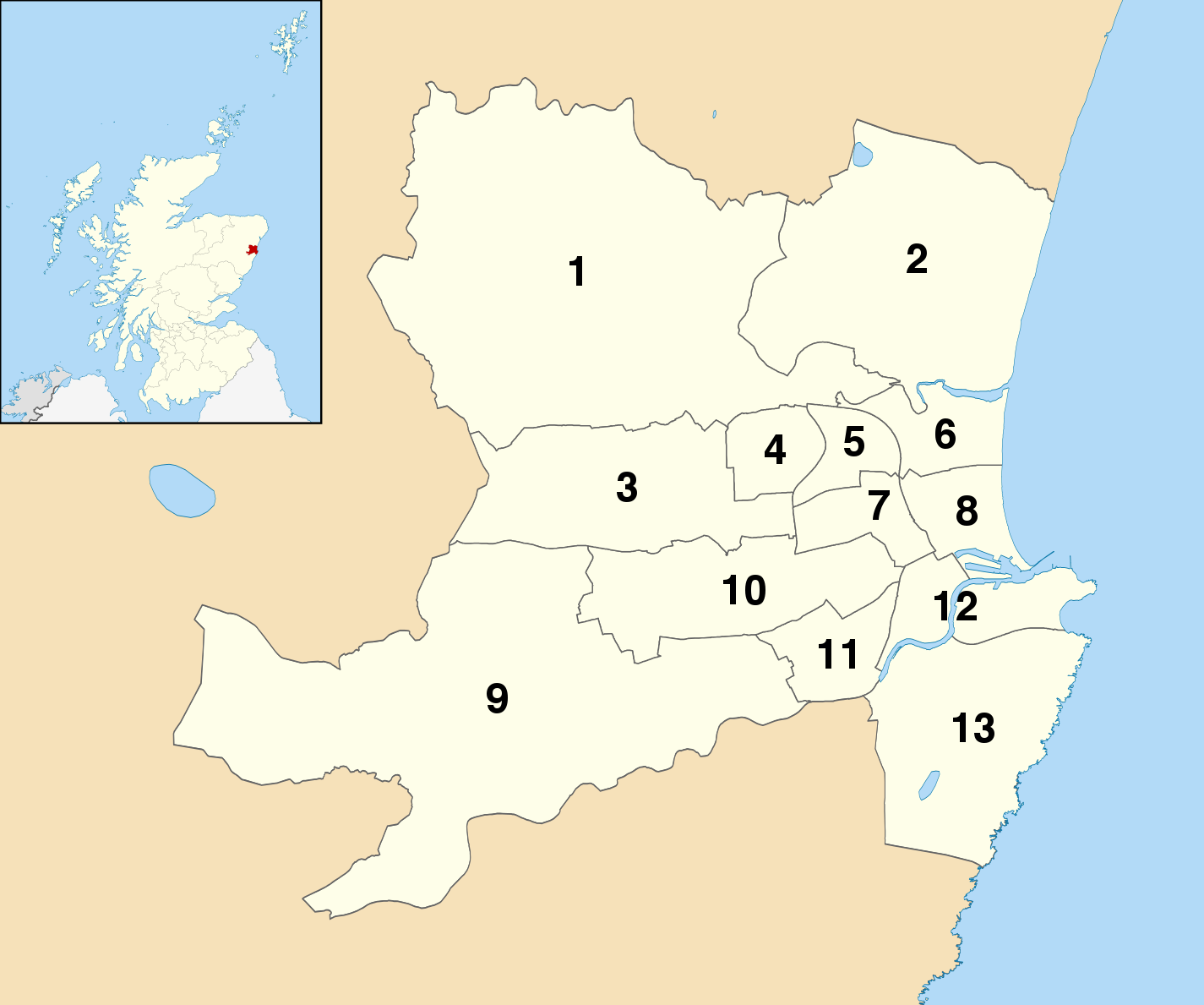
Current Aberdeen wards by number

Ward	Number of councillors
1. Dyce/Bucksburn/Danestone	4 members
2. Bridge of Don	4 members
3. Kingswells/Sheddocksley/Summerhill	3 members
4. Northfield/Mastrick North	3 members
5. Hilton/Woodside/Stockethill	3 members
6. Tillydrone/Seaton/Old Aberdeen	3 members
7. Midstocket/Rosemount	3 members
8. George Street/Harbour	4 members
9. Lower Deeside	3 members
10. Hazlehead/Queens Cross/Countesswells	4 members
11. Airyhall/Broomhill/Garthdee	3 members
12. Torry/Ferryhill	4 members
13. Kincorth/Nigg/Cove	4 members

== Election results ==
=== 2022 ===
2022 Aberdeen City Council election result
Party	Seats	Gains	Losses	Net gain/loss	Seats %	Votes %	Votes	+/−
SNP	20	1	0	▲1	44.4	35.0	23,472	▲2.8
Labour	11	2	0	▲2	24.4	17.5	11,731	▼0.2
Conservative	8	0	3	▼3	17.8	21.6	14,493	▼3.1
Liberal Democrats	4	1	1	Steady	8.9	14.0	9,404	▼1.2
Independent	2	1	1	Steady	4.4	5.3	3,569	▼2.0
Green	0	0	0	Steady	0	5.1	3,414	▲2.9
Alba	0	0	0	Steady	0	0.7	464	New
Scottish Family	0	0	0	Steady	0	0.5	350	New
Scottish Libertarian	0	0	0	Steady	0	0.1	56	▲0.1
Total	45						66,953	

=== 2017 ===
2017 Aberdeen City Council election result
Party	Seats	Gains	Losses	Net gain/loss	Seats %	Votes %	Votes	+/−
SNP	19	-	-	+4	42.2%	32.6%	22,690	+1.3%
Conservative	11	-	-	+8	24.4%	25.0%	17,427	+15.4%
Labour	9	-	-	−8	17.8%	16.9%	11,784	−12.8%
Liberal Democrats	4	-	-	−1	8.9%	15.4%	10,753	+0.3%
Independent	2	-	-	−1	4.4%	7.5%	5,195	−3.7%
Green	0	-	-	-	0	2.3%	1,538	−0.2%
UKIP	0	-	-	-	0	0.3%	202	+0.2%
National Front	0	-	-	-	0		39	
Scottish Libertarian	0	-	-	-	0		31	
Solidarity	0	-	-	-	0		28	
Total	45						69,687	

=== 2012 ===
2012 Aberdeen City Council election result
Party	Seats	Gains	Losses	Net gain/loss	Seats %	Votes %	Votes	+/−
Labour	17	7	0	7	39.5	29.7%	16,264	
SNP	15	4	1	3	34.9	31.3%	17,131	
Liberal Democrats	5	0	10	−10	11.6	15.1%	8,293	
Conservative	3	0	2	−2	7.0	9.7%	5,285	
Independent	3							

Note: The net gain/loss and percentage changes relate to the result of the previous Scottish local elections on 3 May 2007. This may differ from other published sources showing gain/loss relative to seats held at dissolution of Scotland's councils.

=== 2007 ===
2007 Aberdeen City Council election result
Party	Seats	Gains	Losses	Net gain/loss	Seats %	Votes %	Votes	+/−
Liberal Democrats	15	N/A	N/A	−5	34.9	26.9	20,845	
SNP	12	N/A	N/A	+6	27.9	29.5	22,791	
Labour	10	N/A	N/A	−3	23.3	24.6	19,003	
Conservative	5	N/A	N/A	+2	11.6	14.1	10,889	
Independent	1	N/A	N/A	0	2.3	2.7	2,090	
Green	0	N/A	N/A	0	0.0	1.6	1,204	
Solidarity	0	N/A	N/A	0	0.0	0.3	248	
Scottish Socialist	0	N/A	N/A	0	0.0	0.3	218	
BNP	0	N/A	N/A	0	0.0	0.1	81	
