= Strathdee =

Strathdee is a Scottish surname. It means from the Strath of the River Dee in Aberdeenshire. Notable people with the surname include:

- Roy Brown Strathdee (1897–1976), Scottish chemist
- Jim and Jean Strathdee (born 1941 and 1944) American musicians
- Joanna Strathdee (1954–2015), Scottish politician
- Steffanie A. Strathdee (born 1966), Canadian-born American epidemiologist
- Ernest Strathdee (1921-1971), Irish rugby international and television broadcaster

== See also ==
- River Dee, Aberdeenshire
