= James Taggart =

James Taggart may refer to:

- Sir James Taggart (1849–1929), lord provost of Aberdeen, 1914–1919
- James Gordon Taggart (1892–1974), Canadian civil servant and politician
- General James Taggart (Wing Commander), fictional character in the video game Wing Commander
- James Taggart (Atlas Shrugged), fictional character in the novel Atlas Shrugged
- Jim Taggart, lead character in British detective drama series Taggart
- Jim Taggart (Eureka), character in US science fiction series Eureka
