= Gertrude Stoetzel =

American labor leader

- Stoetzel, from a 1906 newspaper
- Born: about 1882; Chicago, Illinois, U.S.
- Died: April 1956; Chicago, Illinois, U.S.
- Other names: Gertrude Stotzel, Gertrude Stoelzel
- Occupations: Garment worker, union organizer, factory inspector

Gertrude Stoetzel (about 1882 – April 1956) was an American labor leader based in Chicago. She served in various executive offices of the Chicago Federation of Labor and the Women's International Union Label League. She was a factory inspector appointed by the Illinois governor in 1913.

== Biography ==
Stoetzel was born in Chicago, the daughter of Jacob Stoelzel and Mary Stricker Stoetzel. Her parents were German immigrants.

Stoetzel working in a tailoring business and was a member of the garment workers' union. She served on the finance committee of the Chicago Federation of Labor, and was vice-president of the Women's International Union Label League. She was considered a beauty, "tall and of good figure, good looking, and well dressed", and was elected Queen at several consecutive annual balls for Chicago's working women. Governor Edward Fitzsimmons Dunne appointed her a deputy factory inspector in 1913, tasked with investigating cases of child labor in the city.

Stoetzel lived with her older sister Catherine. She died in 1956, in Chicago, in her seventies.
