= List of cemeteries and graveyards in Aberdeen =

This is a list of 20 graveyards, burial grounds and cemeteries in Aberdeen, seventeen of which are maintained by Aberdeen City Council.

== Cemeteries in council control ==
- Allenvale Cemetery
- Grove Cemetery
- Hazlehead Cemetery
- Nellfield Cemetery
- Newhills, Old Parish Church, Burial-ground
- St Peter's Cemetery, King Street, Aberdeen
- Springbank Cemetery, Aberdeen
- Trinity Cemetery, Aberdeen

== Churchyards in council control ==
- Dyce, Old Parish Church And Burial-ground
- John Knox Churchyard
- Nigg Parish Church
- St Clement's, Footdee
- St Fittick's Church
- St Machar's Cathedral a.k.a. Old Machar Churchyard
- St Mary's Chapel and graveyard
- St Nicholas, Aberdeen
- St Peter's Parish Church, Peterculter

== Other burial grounds ==
- Friends' Burial Ground, Kingswells, Aberdeen
- Skene Burial Enclosure, Mains Of Dyce
- Snow Church, Aberdeen a.k.a. Snow Kirk
