= Andrew J. W. Lewis =

Scottish businessman

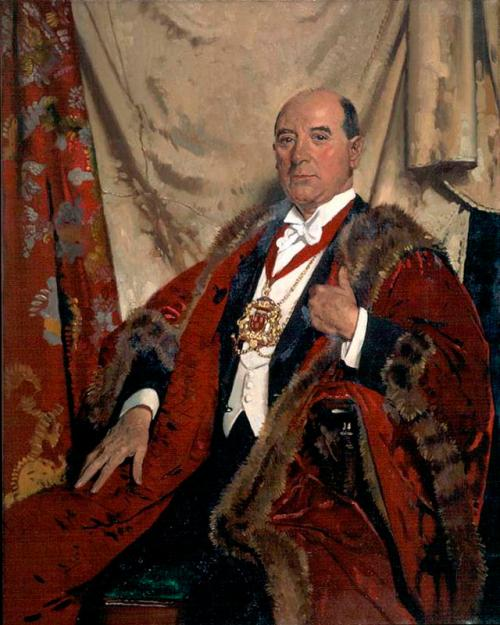
Lord Provost Sir Andrew Lewis by Sir William Orpen

Sir Andrew Jopp Williams Lewis JP (18 April 1875 – 2 February 1952) was a Scottish businessman who served as Lord Provost of Aberdeen.

== Life ==
He was born in the Cove district of Aberdeen on 18 April 1875 the son of John Lewis, owner of J Lewis & Co, boatbuilders, and his wife Elizabeth Williams. He was educated at Aberdeen Grammar School. He was apprenticed as a boatbuilder in his father's company around 1890. In 1907, following his father's death, he took over and renamed the company John Lewis & Sons. He expanded the business, specialising in building and repairing ship engines. They continued their business of building fishing trawlers, but updated this by building refrigerated ships.

Around 1912 he began giving free time as Harbour Commissioner and served on the Aberdeen Harbour Board for 36 years.

He joined Aberdeen Town Council in 1919 representing the ward of Ferryhill. He was elected Lord Provost in 1925 and served two consecutive two-year terms. During his time in office he raised £410,000 to fund the "Joint Hospitals Scheme" (the equivalent of almost £20 million in 2022) which resulted in a major modernisation of Aberdeen Royal Infirmary and Aberdeen Maternity Hospital (which were not completed until 1936).

He stepped out of local politics in 1929 and was knighted by King George V and awarded an honorary doctorate (LLD) by Aberdeen University in the same year, and on 10 December 1929 was created Deputy Lieutenant of Aberdeen.

He died at home in Aberdeen on 2 February 1952.

== Artistic recognition ==
He was portrayed by William Orpen.

Civic offices
Preceded by William Meff	Lord Provost of Aberdeen; 1925–1929	Succeeded by James Reid Rust
