= Springbank cemetery =

== Europe ==
- Springbank Cemetery, Aberdeen

== United States ==
- Springbank Cemetery, Clarke County, Alabama
- Springbank Cemetery, Dixon, Nebraska
- Springbank Cemetery, Ross County, Ohio
- Springbank Cemetery, Clay County, Florida
