= Shirley Murray =

New Zealand hymnwriter (1931–2020)

Shirley Murray MNZM
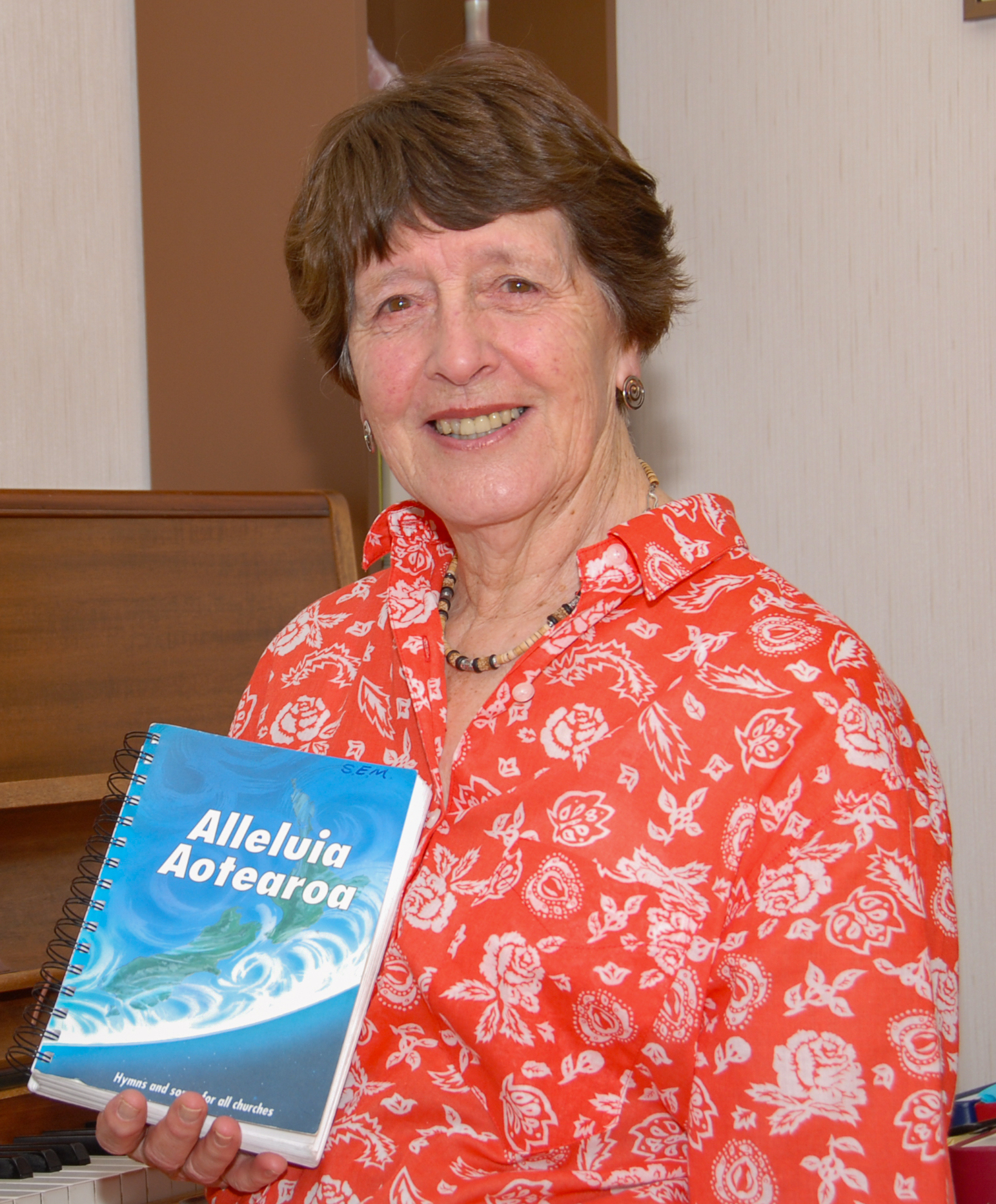
- Born: Shirley Erena Cockroft; 31 March 1931; Invercargill, New Zealand
- Died: 25 January 2020 (aged 88)
- Education: University of Otago
- Occupation: Hymnwriter
- Spouse: John Murray (m. 1954; died 2017)
- Children: 3

Shirley Erena Murray MNZM (née Cockroft; 31 March 1931 – 25 January 2020) was a New Zealand hymnwriter. Her hymns have been translated into numerous languages and are represented in more than 140 hymn collections.

== Biography ==
Born in Invercargill and raised a Methodist, she was educated at Southland Girls' High School. She earned a Master of Arts degree with honours in classics and French from the University of Otago, and later worked as a teacher, parliamentary researcher and producer of radio hymn programmes.

She married John Stewart Murray in Cambridge, England, in 1954, returning with him to New Zealand when he was appointed a Presbyterian Church minister. She eventually moved to Wellington when John became minister at St Andrew's on The Terrace from 1975 to 1993. Her hymn writing started in the 1970s and developed through the 1980s and 90s. The congregation of St Andrew's on The Terrace often became the first to try out her hymns. Her first collection of hymns, In Every Corner Sing: New Hymns to Familiar Tunes in Inclusive Language, was printed privately in 1987, in the hope new music would follow. She later worked with many different composers, including New Zealand hymn writers Colin Gibson and Jillian Bray, to set music to her hymn texts.

Her hymns have been translated into several European and Asian languages and are represented in more than 140 hymn books around the world. In addition to New Zealand, Murray’s hymns are well represented in North America where she worked closely with hymn writers and composers Jim Strathdee, Jane Marshall and Ron Klusmeier amongst many others. Among her most known hymns are "Hymn for Anzac Day", "Where Mountains Rise to Open Skies", "Our Life has its Seasons", "Star Child" and "Upside Down Christmas". Colin Gibson described Murray's hymns in 2009 as "distinguished by their inclusive language and their innovative use of Māori, their bold appropriation of secular terms and their original poetic imagery drawn from nature and domestic life, but equally by the directness with which they confront contemporary issues."

Among these issues are peace, social justice, human rights, inclusivity and ecology. Her hymns comprise around a third of each of the publications of the New Zealand Hymnbook Trust – Alleluia Aotearoa, Hymns and songs for all churches (1993), Carol Our Christmas, A Book of New Zealand Carols (1996), Faith Forever Singing: New Zealand Hymns and Songs for a New Day (2000), He Came Singing Peace: Songs to Overcome Violence (2002), and Hope is our Song: New Hymns and Songs from Aotearoa New Zealand (2009).

Hope Publishing Company in the United States published six collections of her work between 1992 and 2019: In Every Corner Sing: The Hymns of Shirley Erena Murray, Every Day in Your Spirit: New Hymns Written Between 1992 and 1996, Faith Makes the Song: New Hymns Written Between 1997 and 2002, Touch the Earth Lightly: New Hymns Written Between 2003 and 2008, A Place at the Table: New Hymns Written Between 2009 and 2013, and Life into Life: New and Collected Hymns.

In the 2001 Queen's Birthday Honours, Murray was appointed a Member of the New Zealand Order of Merit, for services as a hymn writer. In 2006, she became a fellow of the Royal School of Church Music. She received an honorary doctor of literature degree from the University of Otago in 2009. The same year, she was named a fellow of the Hymn Society in the United States and Canada.

Murray lived with her husband at Raumati Beach near Wellington. The couple had three children and six grandchildren. She died on 25 January 2020, having been predeceased by her husband, John Murray, in 2017.

A biography Peace is Her Song: The life and legacy of hymn writer Shirley Erena Murray was written by Anne Manchester and published in 2024.

== Sources ==
- Manchester, Anne (7 September 2024). Peace is Her Song: The Life and Legacy of Hymn Writer Shirley Erena Murray. Philip Garside Publishing Limited. ISBN 978-1-991027-82-5.
