= Mary H. J. Henderson =

World War I Scottish Women's Hospital administrator, suffragist and war poet

Mary H J Henderson
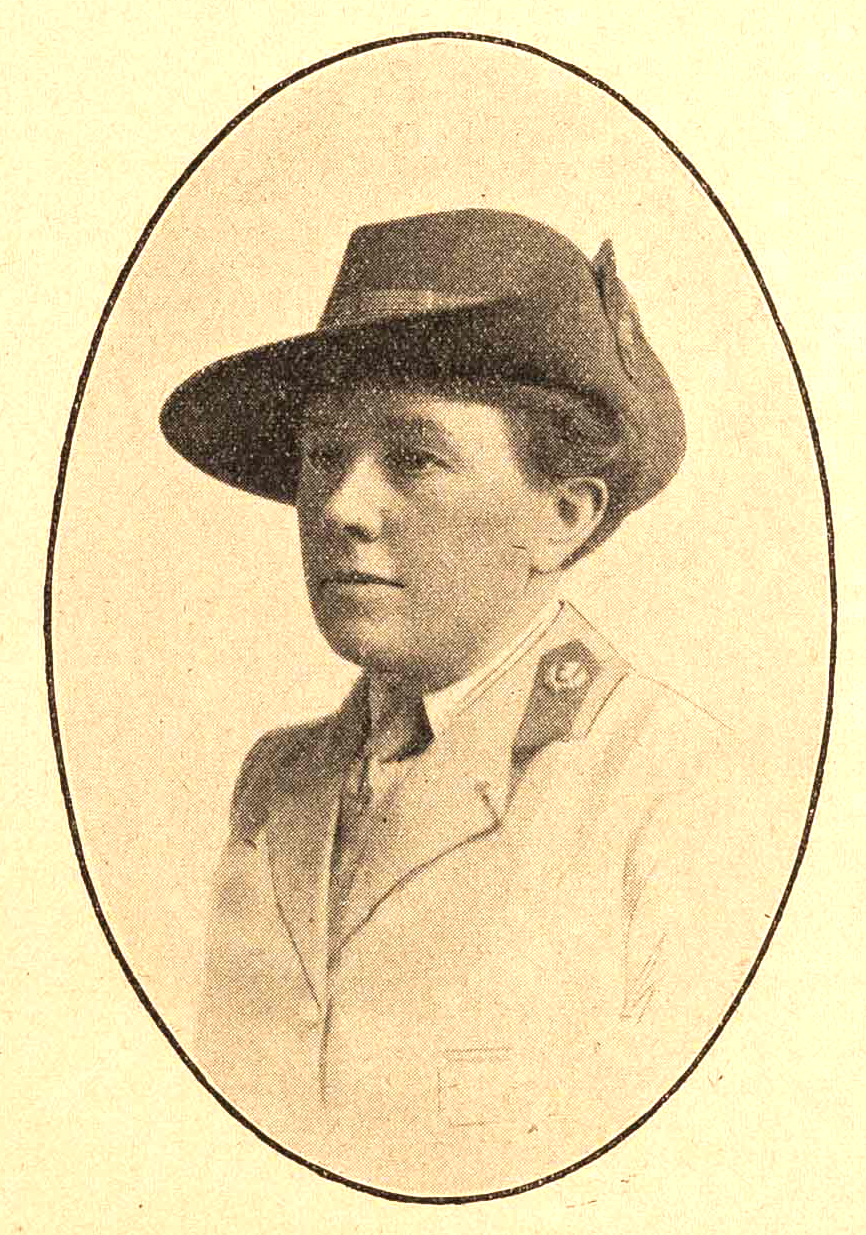
- Born: Mary Helen Jane Henderson; 1874; Aberdeen
- Died: 6 November 1938 (aged 63–64)
- Occupation: administrator with the Scottish Women's Hospitals for Foreign Service
- Known for: support for SWH and War Relief, social causes, including women's suffrage
- Awards: Five medals

Mary H J Henderson (born 1874 – 6 November 1938) was an administrator with Elsie Inglis's Scottish Women's Hospitals for Foreign Service in the Balkans in World War I, earning five medals. She founded social work and civic groups led by women, in Dundee, Aberdeen and London and served on charitable bodies including Dundee War Relief Fund, and worked for women's suffrage. She was also a war poet.

== Life ==
Mary Helen Jane Henderson was born in Old Machar in 1874, the daughter of William Low Henderson, an Aberdeen architect, and had a twin brother; they were cousins of Lady Dunedin. She had lived in a cottage near Queen Victoria's Balmoral Castle and had frequently played there with the Royal grandchildren. She was later to write more about her encounters with Queen Victoria, who presented her with a portrait photograph in 1887, and about John Brown, the Scottish manservant, whom Henderson thought was rude. She had also lived in Italy for some years.

Based in Broughty Ferry, Dundee, for much of her life, Henderson was leading in a number of civic and social organisations in the city for women's suffrage, or war relief efforts or for temperance, and in the care of women and children. She raised funds for the Scottish Women's Hospitals for Foreign Service before joining the service herself as administrator for the Serbian unit. Through illustrated talks and her poetry she shared her war experience, after the war and ( some) women had won the vote, Henderson continued to establish women's citizenship groups.

She died as the result of a car accident in 1938.

== Roles in civic society ==
In 1913, Henderson proposed and was asked to proceed, on behalf of Dundee branch of the National Union of Women Workers, in adding a 'lady representative' onto the board of the Dundee Society for the Prevention of Cruelty to Children. She was a founder of the Dundee Infant Hospital, but later was indignant that women doctors were being dismissed (in 1919), despite the service being founded by women's efforts originally. Her letter to the press was of no avail, as men were to be given preference in medical as in other employment after the war.

Henderson was one of the three women standing in the 1914 Dundee School Board elections; her role at the women's suffrage society was given with her image in the press. A fellow suffragist, Agnes Husband was elected, but although Henderson had more individual votes than the lead candidate (Rev. George Smart), she was not elected due to the current plural voting rights 'plumper' system.

Henderson led the Dundee Women's Suffrage Society from 1913, and was on the Dundee Women's War Relief Executive Committee from 1914 and secretary for the Scottish Women's Hospital for Foreign Service (SWH), before being asked by Dr Inglis to act as the administrator for a new unit to work with the Serbian Army in the war zone in 1916. Prior to leaving for the front, she had held social events for women and children whose men were away, had organised demonstrations for temperance (calls to ban alcohol during the war), and had organised a recruitment drive for more men volunteers to join the forces, and she established a women's debating organisation, the Steeple Club. She later was among those who formed the London Women's Forum. She was presented to the King and Queen at Buckingham Palace for her war service, when His Majesty shared with Henderson, his condolences for the loss of Dr. Elsie Inglis, founder of SWH.

== Role in the women's suffrage movement ==
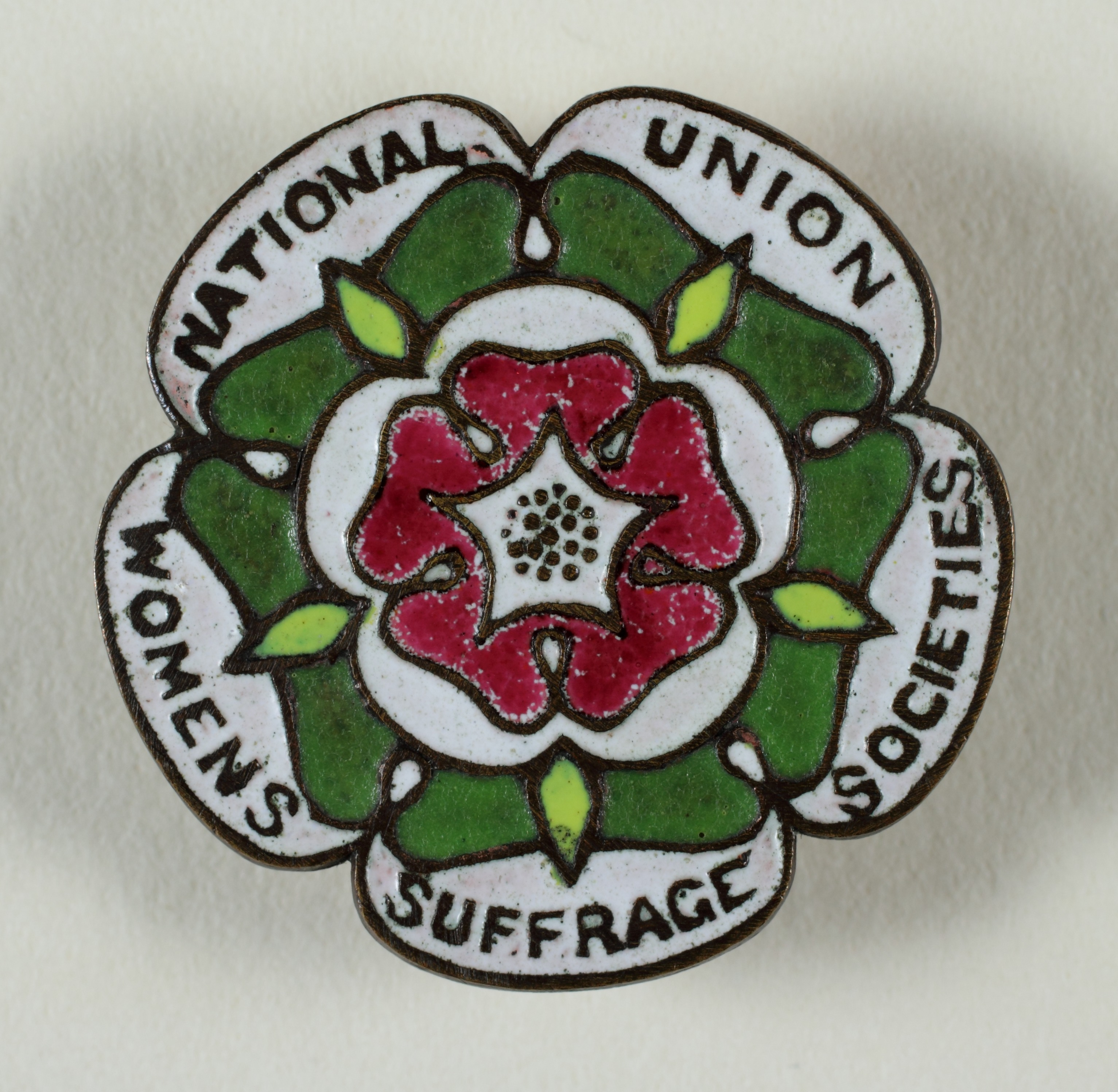
NUWSS logo

In 1913, whilst Henderson was honorary secretary of the Dundee Women's Suffrage Society (which was non-militant and non-party), the group gained 40 new members, reaching a total of two hundred and five. Henderson claimed 'increased public support' would eventually bring about enfranchisement of women, but the national (NUWSS) policy review would need to move from having 'educated individual members' to having to 'educate the parties'.

That year Henderson held a cafe chantant, which hosted suffragist Alice Crompton, who described the growth of the non-militant movement to '60 branches, and almost 40,000 members across Scotland'. Lady Baxter gave a supportive speech before the entertainment and refreshments. In January 1914, Henderson chaired a joint meeting of Dundee NUWSS and the Independent Labour Party. She had become Parliamentary Secretary of the Scottish Women's Suffrage Societies, and the speaker Ethel Snowden held a large audience in 'rapt attention'.

The militant campaign for women's suffrage was suspended at the start of the World War I. Henderson wrote to the Lord Provost offering Dundee Women's Suffrage Society's members' services, its premises and resources to help organise the war relief effort without 'overlapping, such as unfortunately occurred at the time of the Boer War'. It was agreed to form a Dundee Women's War Relief Executive Committee (DWWREC) with Henderson appointed as its first secretary. She informed the Dundee WSS in August 1916 that their branch had raised the largest contribution to the work of the Scottish Women's Hospitals 'of any individual Suffrage Society in the United Kingdom'. By March 1918, £3,641 was the total.

Henderson's view in 1916 was that 'public opinion was just now sympathetic towards granting women the vote' but she wondered whether this view would remain 'when it became a question of practical politics' after the war.

== War relief executive ==
As the first secretary of Dundee Women's War Relief Executive Committee (DWWREC), Henderson agreed that each city ward was to be given its own local committee. She led the voluntary women's employment initiative with her group, including establishing a toy factory paying female workers and supporting unemployed women with financial grants. The Prince of Wales Fund Executive (convened by the Lord Provost) then made Henderson's 'large number of ladies' volunteering, into an official committee after hearing praise from Mary Paterson, secretary of the Scottish Committee on Women's Employment. The women's paid work was seen as a 'nucleus' of a viable industry for employing unemployed girls, offering training in typing and dressmaking, and the toys made were to be sold. Henderson's volunteers had been 'collecting and distributing comforts to the soldiers and sailors, organising clubs for local troops, and social evenings for the women'. Popular periodical The People's Journal reported Henderson's update that the women of Dundee had donated large volumes of articles, to Black Watch, RNVR and others, and the DWWRC donations grew throughout the war.

Donations via Dundee Women's War Relief Committee
Date of report	Cumulative Totals	Type of items made or donated
October 1914	15,834 pairs	socks
	200 items	shirts
	not stated	cholera belts, mitts, cuffs, mufflers, helmets
December 1914	36,000 per month	donations of all types as above
	£50.00	money from toys sold ( and 50 women were employed in knitting and sewing)
April 1915	58,955 articles	all types as above
June 1915 July 1915	61,584 articles £1,500	all types as above donated for the work of the Scottish Women's Hospitals
August 1916	136,000 articles	all types as above
November 1916	148,047 articles	all types sent to the frontline troops and hospitals
March 1918	£3,641	'the largest contribution to the work of the Scottish Women's Hospitals 'of any individual Suffrage Society in the United Kingdom'.

The Courier noted in October 1914, that '15,834 pairs of socks, over 200 shirts, cholera belts, mitts, cuffs, mufflers and helmets' had been reported by Henderson as sent to the front. She continued to report regularly to the DWWREC on the cumulative totals of donations which were being co-ordinated (by November 1916 over 148,000 articles) for the 'comfort' of the troops.

Just before Christmas 1914, Henderson said 36,000 articles per month were being donated, and that letters of appreciation were received from the front, and the toys sold had raised £50. The Edinburgh Women's Emergency Corps. visited to learn the techniques of toy manufacture.

Her committee had another novel idea for Primrose Day i.e. charging for a 'charming girl' to pin a 'beautiful blossom' onto lapels to raise funds 'for providing soldiers with shirts, socks and other comforts.' Henderson also explained some of the cash collected went to Dundee and Tayport Red Cross, and the group were considering opening a 'dry' (i e non-alcoholic) canteen.

=== Prohibition and abstention proposal ===
Henderson was a keynote speaker after thousands of women and supporters had paraded through Dundee promoting temperance, demanding a war-time alcohol prohibition, which she said would be 'a patriotic act'. Lady Baxter, Salvation Army and Girl Guides and temperance organisations led with banners and a plea for non-abstainers to give up alcohol during the war. Henderson said that (as a non-abstainer herself) she had been convinced 'by incontrovertible facts' that 'it was best for the country' for alcohol manufacture and sales to be banned during the war and for 'a period of demobilisation''. Mr Mackay of Glasgow said that the Dundee women had the right to make these demands because ' they had given of their best, their sons, for the defence of our freedom. and they had the right to demand in return that the country would defend their sons'. Henderson heard that research had shown that women, anxious for men at the front, were turning to drink as a way of coping, leading to inebriation and a risk of abuse of children, in half of the cases referred to the Society for the Prevention of Cruelty to Children in 1916, and she asked for a women's committee to be established. Economic constraints to help the war effort (closing museums, reducing printing of books, newspapers) were discussed, with a suggestion at the meeting that it needed a Czar-like 'total ban on whisky' to reduce the risk to the 'lives of children'.

=== Social support for women, and recruitment drive ===
Henderson's interest in the welfare of mothers and children included supporting a social event for the families attending the Blackscroft Clinic in Dundee. Prizes were given for regular attendance, and for the care of 'delicate' children. She thanked the hostesses and praised the mothers for their 'true patriotism by doing their very best to bring up a strong, healthy and happy race'. She presided over a musical and sketch entertainment for the Dundee troops at the Overgate soldiers' and sailors' canteen formal opening in 1915, and had mingled with the wives and adult daughters of the troops at a recruiting innovation - 2,000 women again marching 'with flags and bannerettes' with slogans encouraging young men to 'join up' as their own husbands and fathers and sons had done.

== Involvement with the Scottish Women's Hospitals (SWH) ==
In June 1915, Henderson became honorary secretary of the Scottish Women's Hospitals for Foreign Service and her fundraising effort took place in large and small venues, encouraging organisations to raise funds or to sponsor named beds e.g.'Broughty Ferry St. Margaret's School Bed', and the Montrose Girls Club Bed (at SWH Royaumont, France). Having returned from visiting SWH units in France, Henderson gave lantern talks and presided over an entertainment for the wives and children of the active service troops. Another large audience heard from Henderson as to why these 'brave women' were treating Allies and not their own wounded (because the British Army and Red Cross had told Dr. Elsie Inglis that the women were not needed), but the women's hospital services were welcomed by the Belgian, French and Serbian Allies. She reported that the SWH operation had grown to 250 staff covering 1,000 beds. Henderson remarked that the French General Joffre had donated 300 of the 1000 francs given for French hospitals to the SWH. Dundonians had raised £1,500 and local people were at SWH; Dundee university graduates: Dr Laura Sandeman, Dr Lena Campbell in Serbia and Dr Keith Proctor in France; Miss Shepherd and ex-Provost Lindsay of Broughty Ferry's daughter.

Later that year Henderson spoke in Brechin, and at the local suffrage society in Cupar, who sponsored a 'Cupar-Fife' bed (in SWH Serbia); Dr. Inglis was herself a Scottish suffragist. In March 1916, Henderson presented 'the grand mission' of SWH at a well attended local fund-raising concert, and chaired an event with Dr Alice Hutchison speaking on the SWH in Serbia (in the place of Dr Inglis in April 1916).

The news of her departure to join Dr Inglis herself, was said to have 'disturbed' the 'wonted even tenor' of the DWWREC, as they would miss her dedicated service, but there was public recognition in the city and in national suffrage societies that her skills would be of benefit to Dr Inglis's unit. Before going, Henderson had founded the Dundee women's civic group, the Steeple Club. In August 1916, the Dundee Women's War Relief Executive Committee gave Henderson practical gifts: an attache case, tartan blanket, pens and paper, as well as flowers. She thanked them for the praise for her relief work, which she said was due to a good team.

=== Role as administrator in the Serbian SWH Unit ===
Henderson then served as an administrator in Serbia and Russia with a new unit of Scottish Women's Hospitals for Foreign Service, organising and working in dangerous circumstances during the gruelling retreat of the Serbians, with Evelina Haverfield as the unit commandant. The Unit set sail from Liverpool on 30 August 1916, and Henderson sent a postcard saying 'all well' on 21 October 1916. In November 1916, Henderson had sent a postcard from Odessa.

A month later, she was home on a short leave, and in an interview with The Scotsman, she explained that 75 Scottish, English and Irish women made up the 'self-contained' staff of the hospital unit and the transport unit (ambulance drivers). She told of the 'equanimity and cheerfulness' despite the dangers and hardships and said that ' the girls were splendid'.

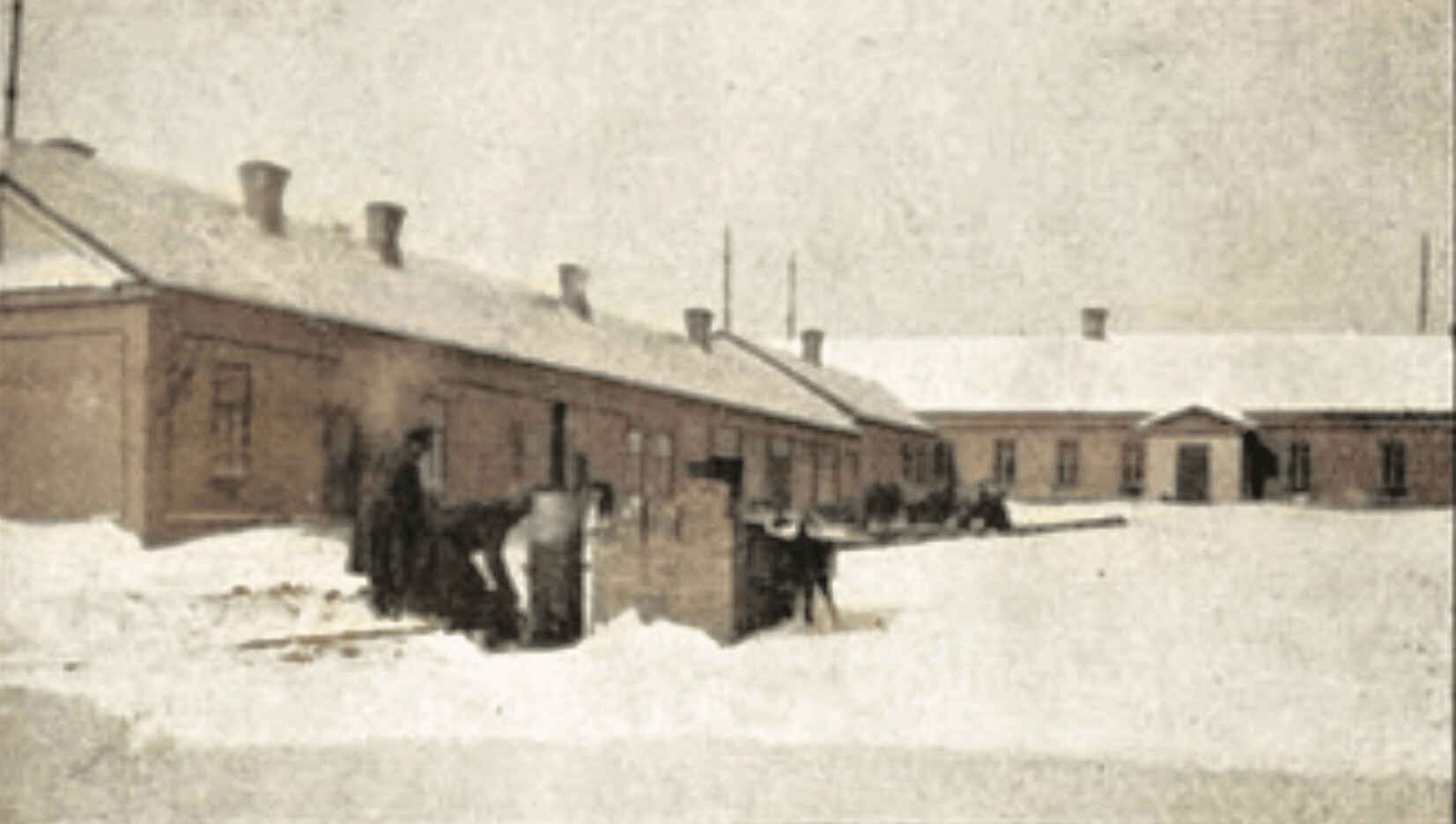
Scottish Women's Hospital - Russia Mejidia

Henderson described the efforts of their journey and setting up as a hospital so rapidly to be able to receive 100 patients in less than one day from arrival. A week later they were moving on to a field hospital (tents) closer to the front at Boulboulmink; but when the fighting got too close, the group moved on again mixing with retreating Serbian and Rumanian troops and peasants, with their livestock, on the road to Mejidia and beyond, through snow, mud and darkness, with shelling no more than a mile away.

A more detailed account of the mishaps of Henderson and SWH's journey, the feelings of fear of capture by the Bulgars and of responsibility for the girls under her care, were related to Common Cause, the suffragist journal, as the next episode of her war experiences.

Henderson had left the group with a small team to find Dr Chesney's unit but the women got separated from the Serbian forces, sleeping in the open air, before reaching 'civilization' with the Russian authorities, at Reni. Then they travelled by rail with Dr Inglis group although she said with overcrowding on the train, she saw a Russian doctor prevent a soldier with cholera from boarding, which she said was the most 'pathetic' thing she had seen in her experiences, 'that poor man put off the train and left in the darkness'. The train was also almost bombed by enemy aircraft, but for the quick-thinking of the train driver. Challenges arose in crossing occupied country, and Henderson remarked that, despite the group being in mortal danger, very little equipment was lost. The next tent hospital at Boulboulja was exposed to enemy aircraft by sitting on a wide plain. Again the women in the transport teams worked as soon as they had 'scarcely arrived' to bring in the wounded for urgent treatment, despite their lack of sleep.

Henderson's stories about the Serbian (Rumanian) retreat were featured in The People's Journal and she said that in grey khaki uniforms, and with a military demeanour it was 'almost impossible' for local 'peasants.. at first glance to guess their sex.' She said Serbians and Rumanians 'knew' the people from the Scottish Women's Hospital as 'angels in disguise'.

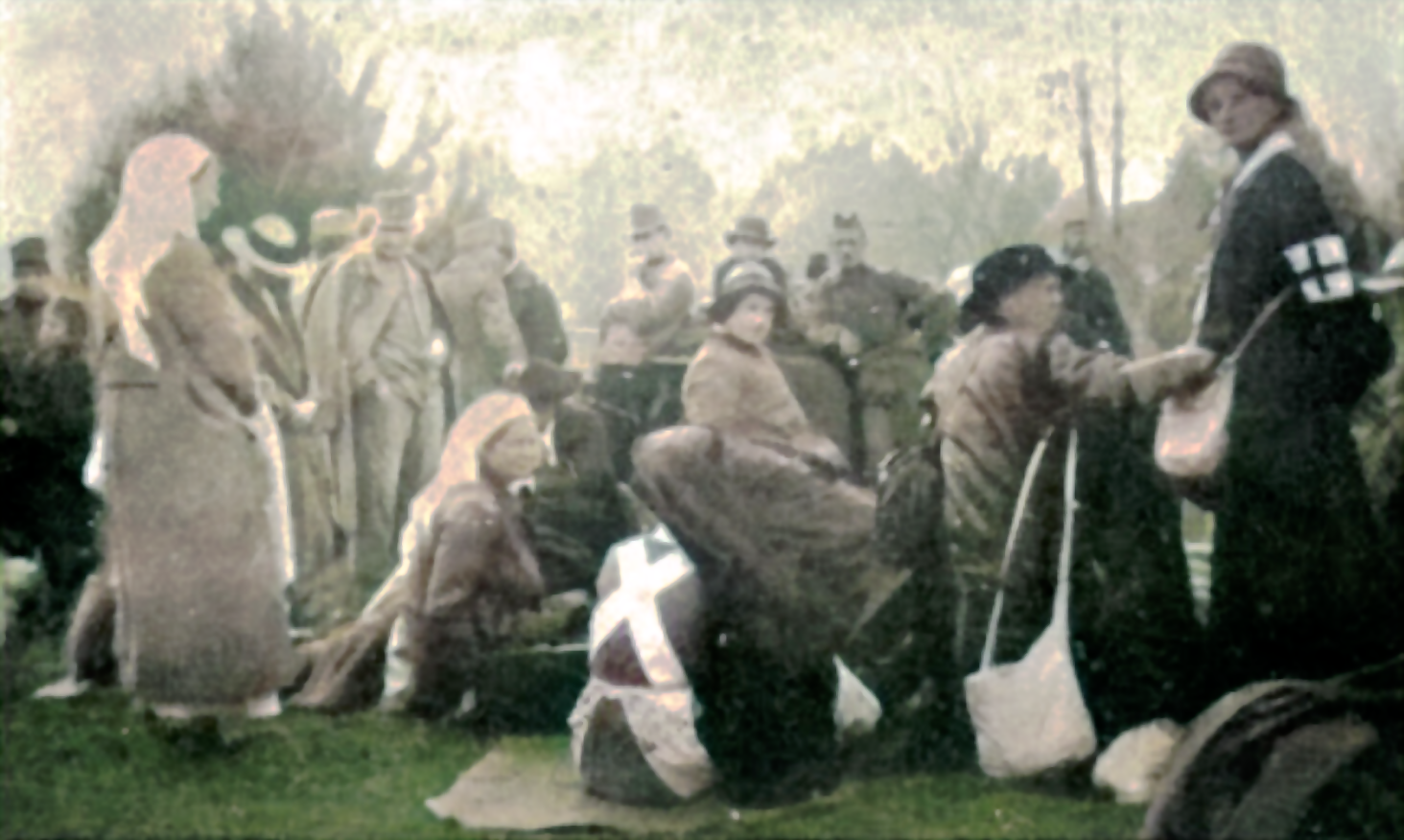
Scottish Women's Hospital - resting during the Great Retreat (November 1915)

The Telegraph and Guardian reported her return to London in 1917, from Dobrudja and her trials during the Serbian retreat, mentioning that she was in Constanza, a city full of wounded soldiers, so had only left the day before the Germans occupied the city. Also in Bucharest, the hospitals were being evacuated en route. The volumes of the injured that the nurses were dealing with was 1,000 to 3,000 per day, and Henderson's view was of 'success of the British Military Mission' in that area. She was back home to organise equipment supplies following the retreat, travelling via Norway. In November 1917, Henderson gave another lecture in Dundee and 'held the attention of a large audience' with her 'power of description' and images of the work of the hospitals, and she emphasised the importance of the allies in Belgium, Serbia and Rumania to the overall war effort. She said that of 60,000 boys (over 11 years old) who had left during the Serbian retreat, only 15,000 had survived. 45,000 had died on the road, or later from exposure. She then spoke in Manchester, in July 1917, in aid of the Rumanian Red Cross.

=== Writing about the war ===
Henderson wrote about her experiences, as some other women in the SWH did, in war diaries and she wrote poetry.

Her poems were described as a 'vision of war seen from the inside, and finding expression through the woman-poet's mind', and she called the nurses 'her sisters'. Describing the mundane efforts of bringing supplies by The Cargo Boat, one critic described it as ' worthy of Kipling at his best'. In another poem, The Incident (probably a culmination of many such incidents she witnessed), she compares the injured soldier to a crucified Christ and his nurse to a mother or the Virgin Mary and she composed to a similar theme in A Young Serbian'.

In another poem she dedicated 'to the rank and file of the Elsie Inglis Unit', titled Like That, based on a quote from the Prefect of Constanza: 'No wonder Britain is so great if her women are like that' , Henderson writes of the war nurses as being as heroic as the men under fire, in November 1916

I've seen you kneeling on the wooden floor,

Tending your wounded on their straw-strewn bed,

Heedless the while, that right above your head

The Bird of Menace scattered death around.

...

I've seen you, oh my nurses, 'under fire',

While in your hearts their burned but one desire -

What British men and women hold so dear -

To do your duty without any fear.

=== In Russia just after the Soviet revolution ===
Henderson found herself in Petrograd on the 18th March 1917, days after the February Russian Revolution. She told the Dundee Courier reporter that she was impressed by ' the wonderful order' in the streets, kept by volunteers (all armed) and reported that there was joyful singing in Russian of the revolutionary song, the Marseillaise, and also her surprise at 'cartoons and caricatures of Emperor, the Empress and Rasputin' openly on sale. She gave her political opinion that 'the strength of Russia' lay in M. Kerensky, their Minister of War and her view that the sheer size of the country was a challenge to alliance to the new regime, but that she was convinced 'the women do not fail' in understanding patriotism in its widest sense.

== Post-war Women Citizens Association ==
In 1918, the Representation of the People's Act gave some women - such as those over the age of 30 or with certain property conditions - the right to vote. Henderson was one of the speakers at the inauguration meeting of a branch of the Women Citizens Association, in April 1918. It was said that every space was occupied and every class - 'leisured, educational and industrial' represented. She was elected to the committee, and the organisation's aim was not just to engage 'new voters' but to represent and encourage debate from all women. Henderson said that 'one of women's supreme privileges was the preservation of the race'. In a later debate with the Dundee Council, on housing, she asked 'the key question' - What proportion of wages should be paid as rent? Councillors could not answer, which led Henderson to plead for the Women Citizens Association to undertake research into the proportions of rent to income that were currently pertaining, and she pressed the city for a permanent woman's centre rather than ad hoc venues, which would, she argued, help to ensure 'the hundredfold increase of the effective power of the women of the city.

=== Establishing other women's civic society groups ===
The Steeple Club she had formed before her SWH service, met on 23 November 1917. Henderson expound her belief that the 'like minded' women were 'city mothers' comparable with the 'city fathers' and the group 'had proved itself to be worthwhile'. She felt that 'civic consciousness or communal sense was simply an expression of the home-making instinct - the widening of womanliness - to include not only the individual roof-tree but the home life of the city and the State'. In its second year, Steeple Club was deemed a success, with 58 meetings or events, an exhibition of women artists work, in aid of the Dundee Prisoners of War Fund. In its third year, it had held over 100 events. Henderson was re-elected as president, despite departing for London for a period and the press reported the Steeple Club had grown in its 'sense of civic consciousness'

Henderson was one of the founders of the Ladies' Forum Club, London, owned and controlled by women, and she served on the inaugural committee with fellow Scot, Janie Russell. It was noted that she 'was well known and esteemed for her public service', had served in Serbia and Russia at the Scottish Women's Hospitals and crossed the North Sea four times in a year, and her poem Judith and Holofernes was considered 'a serious poem', 'welcomed by discerning critics'. She attended the opening event in uniform with Florence Haig, the suffragette activist.

In 1925, Henderson was back in Scotland, and began and then became managing director of the Ladies' Town and County Club, in Aberdeen. Now living in Lumsden, she became involved with the local hospital executive, District Nursing Association and the local Women's Rural Institute (W.R.I.). She was also a member of the Soroptomist Club.

== Unexplained death and funeral ==
Henderson was aged 64 when she died on 6 November 1938 in the Nicoll Hospital, Rhynie, where she had served on the executive. She had been seriously injured, with a fractured skull, the previous day in an unexplained motor accident.

This happened in Strathdon, after travelling back home from Ballater. A passing motorist had found her lying injured near the overturned car, but she was said to be initially conscious saying 'something went wrong'.

When she died her twin brother was living in Wales; and her nephew Alexander Whyte Henderson was a pall-bearer at her funeral in Clova chapel, preceded by a Requiem Mass. Henderson's five war medals were displayed at her funeral. There was a large local attendance, including representatives from groups she had served, such as the WRI, District Nursing Association and the hospital.

She is buried in Auchindoir Churchyard.

One of her poems, My Desire says:

'Oh lay me where the morning mist

Lies softly on the hill,

Where the light and shade of summer cloud

Flits to and fro at will.'

== Poetry books and reviews ==
Henderson's In War and Peace: Songs of a Scotswoman was published in 1918, with a foreword by John Oxenham in which he said that she wrote a 'conspicuous' poem on Dr. Elsie Inglis (see below), and other poems 'musically express' her observations in Russia and Rumania, as well as 'thoughtful, sympathetic and strong verses' in contemplation 'or religious exaltation' resulting from her experience of war.

It was described as 'exquisite little war vignettes' and overall of a 'very high level' and sold to raise funds for the SWH.

She recognised the long term impact on women of the 'lost generation' of men in World War I as a form of 'desolation' in another poem, A Grave in France.

Her 1929 book of poems in Warp and Woof - a recommended Christmas gift - had mixed reviews: her 'love of nature and sparing and effective use of the Scottish idiom' (in My Desire); 'a little preoccupied with grief and death, and a calm religious spirit pervades her work'; some 'maternal war poems', or An Episode, about unemployment were called 'full of pathos'; but she was said to be 'real blythe' in A Summer Ecstasy where she 'imitates in her rhythm the song of a bird'; and The Bud of the Cross, was 'one of the loveliest' poems. Her poems in blank verse on Biblical subjects were 'particularly successful'.

Henderson's poetic tribute to SWH colleagues like Dr Laura Sandeman, and Dr Elsie Inglis, Magdalene, says:

'The hands indeed,

which minister where there was need;

The hands we loved, may not touch ours again,

May not alleviate our mortal pain,

They lie quiescent in the hands of God'.

== See also ==
- Women's suffrage in Scotland
- Scottish Women's Hospitals for Foreign Service
- War poet
