= Baron Trefgarne =

Barony in the Peerage of the United Kingdom

Baron Trefgarne, of Cleddau in the County of Pembroke, is a title in the Peerage of the United Kingdom. It was created in 1947 for the barrister, journalist and politician, George Garro-Jones. In 1954 he assumed by deed poll the surname of Trefgarne in lieu of Garro-Jones. As of 2016 the title is held by his son, the second Baron, who succeeded in 1960. He served in junior ministerial positions in the Conservative administrations of Margaret Thatcher and is now one of the ninety elected hereditary peers that remain in the House of Lords after the passing of the House of Lords Act 1999.

== Barons Trefgarne (1947) ==
- George Morgan Trefgarne, 1st Baron Trefgarne (1894–1960)
- David Garro Trefgarne, 2nd Baron Trefgarne (born 1941)

The heir apparent is the present holder's eldest son, the Hon. George Garro Trefgarne (b. 1970).
The heir apparent's heir apparent is his son, William David Garro Trefgarne (b. 2010).

== Arms ==
Coat of arms of Baron Trefgarne
Coronet That of a British Baron. Crest On a mount Vert a tree Proper suspended therefrom an escutcheon Or charged with a portcullis Gules. Escutcheon Or a dragon rampant Gules over all on a bend Azure a leek of the first between two thistles Proper. Supporters On either side a Herefordshire bull charged on the shoulder with an escutcheon Or thereon a portcullis Azure. Motto Ratione Et Concillio
