= Aberdeen North (UK Parliament constituency) =

Parliamentary constituency in the United Kingdom, 1885 onwards

Coordinates: 57.176°N 2.135°W

- Burgh constituency for the House of Commons
- Boundary of Aberdeen North in Scotland
- Subdivision: Aberdeen City
- Electorate: 76,895 (March 2020)

Current constituency
- Created: 1885
- Member of Parliament: Kirsty Blackman (Scottish National Party)
- Seats: One
- Created from: Aberdeen

Overlaps
- Scottish Parliament: North East Scotland

Aberdeen North is a burgh constituency of the House of Commons of the Parliament of the United Kingdom. It elects one Member of Parliament (MP) by the first past the post system of election. It was first used in the 1885 general election, but has undergone various boundary changes since that date. The seat has been held by Kirsty Blackman of the Scottish National Party since 2015.

At the 2019 general election, the constituency had the largest SNP vote share and relative majority, effectively making it the safest SNP seat, although this majority was heavily reduced at the subsequent 2024 election.

There was also an Aberdeen North constituency of the Scottish Parliament, created in 1999 with the boundaries of the Westminster seat of that time. This constituency was abolished in 2011, its area thereafter being covered by the new constituencies of Aberdeen Donside and Aberdeen Central. (See also Scottish Parliament constituencies and regions.)

== Constituency profile ==
The seat covers much of the northern half of the Aberdeen Council Area. It includes affluent suburbs like Kingswells and Bridge of Don, alongside areas with significant social housing within the city proper such as Tillydrone, Northfield, Mastrick and Bucksburn.

== Boundaries ==
=== Historic ===
==== 1885 to 1918 ====
From 1832 to 1885 there was a single Aberdeen constituency. Prior to 1832, the burgh of Aberdeen had been represented as a component of the Aberdeen Burghs constituency.

When Aberdeen North was created by the Redistribution of Seats Act 1885 and first used in the 1885 general election, so was Aberdeen South. Aberdeen North then consisted of the municipal wards of St Clement, St Andrew, St Machar and Greyfriars, and the 10th and 11th Parliamentary Polling Districts. The rest of the county of Aberdeen was covered by the county constituencies of Eastern Aberdeenshire and Western Aberdeenshire.

The same boundaries were used in the 1886 general election, the 1892 general election, the 1895 general election, the 1900 general election, the 1906 general election, the January 1910 general election and the December 1910 general election.

==== 1918 to 1950 ====
In 1918 constituency boundaries were redefined by the Representation of the People Act 1918. By then the county of city of Aberdeen had been created and, together with Aberdeen North, Aberdeen South became one of two constituencies covering the city (which was one of four counties of cities in Scotland) and entirely within the city. The new boundaries were first used in the 1918 general election, and Aberdeen North then consisted of the wards of Greyfriars, St Andrew, St Clement, St Machar, Torry and Woodside. The county of Aberdeen was covered by Aberdeen and Kincardine East, Central Aberdeenshire and Kincardine and West Aberdeenshire. Aberdeen and Kincardine East and Central Aberdeenshire were entirely within the county of Aberdeen. Kincardine and West Aberdeenshire covered the county of Kincardine minus the burgh of Inverbervie, which was covered by Montrose Burghs, and part of the county of Aberdeen.

The same boundaries were used in the 1922 general election, the 1923 general election, the 1924 general election, the 1929 general election, the 1931 general election, the 1935 general election and the 1945 general election.

==== 1950 to 1955 ====
For the 1950 general election boundaries were redefined again, by the House of Commons (Redistribution of Seats) Act 1949. A new list of wards defined Aberdeen North - Glimonston, Greyfriars, St Clement, St Machar, St Nicholas and Woodside - but the county of city of Aberdeen remained a two-constituency city, divided between Aberdeen South and Aberdeen North, with both constituencies entirely within the city.

The county of Aberdeen was now again divided between East Aberdeenshire and West Aberdeenshire, with both of these constituencies entirely within the county.

The same boundaries were used for the 1951 general election.

==== 1955 to 1983 ====
By the time of the 1955 general election, a boundary review had taken account of a small enlargement of the city area, and Aberdeen North was defined as consisting of the wards of Cairncry, St Andrews, St Clement's, St Machar, St Nicholas and Woodside. The same boundaries were used for the 1959 general election, the 1964 general election, the 1966 general election and the 1970 general election.

For the February 1974 general election there was, again, no change to the boundaries of Aberdeen North, but a review had defined the constituency in terms of a new list of wards. The new wards were Mastrick, Northfield, St Clement's, St Machar, St Nicholas, and Woodside. February 1974 boundaries were used also for the October 1974 general election.

In 1975, throughout Scotland, under the Local Government (Scotland) Act 1973, counties were abolished, and the enlarged City of Aberdeen district was formed by including areas formerly within the county of Aberdeen and the county of Kincardine. The City of Aberdeen district became a district within the Grampian region. The enlarged district included areas covered by the constituencies of West Aberdeenshire and North Angus and Mearns. North Angus and Mearns had been created in 1950 to cover the county of Kincardine and part of the county of Angus.

The 1979 general election was held before a review of constituency boundaries took account of new local government boundaries.

==== 1983 to 1997 ====
In this period the constituency was made up of the City of Aberdeen District electoral divisions of Ashgrove, Brimmond, Kittybrewster, Mastrick, Northfield East, Northfield West, St Machar, Seaton, Summerfield, and Woodside.

The 1983 general election, the 1987 general election and the 1992 general election took place during this period.

In 1996, under the Local Government etc (Scotland) Act 1994, local government regions and districts were abolished and the city became one of 32 unitary council areas of Scotland. Also, the name of the city became, officially, Aberdeen City.

==== 1997 to 2005 ====
In this period the constituency was made up of the City of Aberdeen District electoral divisions of Balgownie, Brimmond, Danestone, Mastrick, Middleton, Northfield, Summerfield, and West Don, as provided for by the Parliamentary Constituencies (Scotland) Order 1995.

As redefined for the 1997 general election, Aberdeen North was one of three constituencies covering and entirely within the Aberdeen City area, the other two being Aberdeen South and Aberdeen Central. Aberdeen South shared boundaries with both of the other two constituencies.

==== 2005 to 2024 ====
Map of boundaries 2005–2024

As redefined by the Fifth Review of the Boundary Commission for Scotland, and subsequently first used in the 2005 general election, Aberdeen North was entirely within the Aberdeen City council area and one of five constituencies covering that council area and the Aberdeenshire council area.

In this period the constituency was made up of the Aberdeen City Council wards of Auchmill, Berryden, Castlehill, Cummings Park, Donmouth, Hilton, Kittybrewster, Mastrick, Midstocket, Newhills, Pittodrie, St Machar, Seaton, Sheddocksley, Springhill, Stockethill, Summerhill, Sunnybank, and Woodside, as provided for by the Parliamentary Constituencies (Scotland) Order 2005.

Fifth Review changes included the transfer of Bridge of Don, Dyce and Danestone areas from Aberdeen North to Gordon, and the new Aberdeen North has boundaries which are very different from those of the earlier constituency. The northern boundary of the earlier constituency coincided with the northern boundary of the Aberdeen City council area. At that time, Aberdeen Central and Aberdeen South covered the rest of the Aberdeen City council area, and all three Aberdeen constituencies were entirely within the council area.

=== Current ===
Map of boundaries from 2024

Following the 2023 review of Westminster constituencies which came into effect for the 2024 general election, the newly redrawn Aberdeen North consists of the following:

- In full: the Aberdeen City Council wards of Dyce/Bucksburn/Danestone, Bridge of Don, Kingswells/Sheddocksley/Summerhill, Northfield/Mastrick North, Hilton/Woodside/Stockethill, Tillydrone/Seaton/Old Aberdeen;
- In part: the Aberdeen City Council ward of Midstocket/Rosemount (excluding a small area in the southeast of the ward).

The Bridge of Don, Dyce and Danestone areas were transferred back from the now abolished constituency of Gordon. To partly compensate, the city centre and harbour areas covered by the George Street/Harbour ward were transferred to Aberdeen South.

== Members of Parliament ==
Year	Member	Party
1885	William Hunter	Liberal
1895	Duncan Pirie	Liberal
1918	Frank Rose	Labour
1928 by-election	William Wedgwood Benn	Labour
1931	John George Burnett	Unionist
1935	George Garro-Jones	Labour
1945	Hector Hughes	Labour
1970	Robert Hughes	Labour
1997	Malcolm Savidge	Labour
2005	Frank Doran	Labour
2015	Kirsty Blackman	SNP

== Election results ==
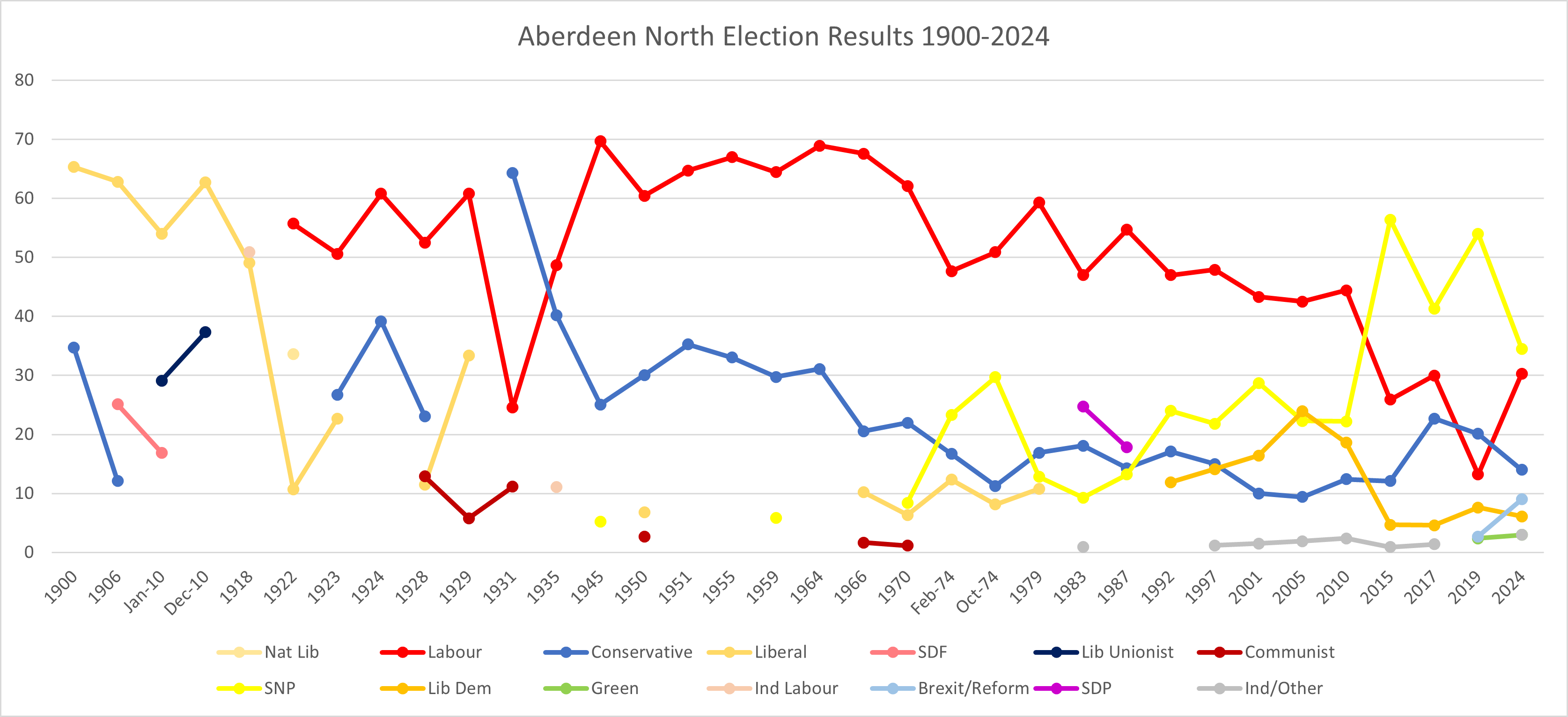
Graph showing Aberdeen North Election Results 1900–2024

=== Elections in the 2020s ===
2024 general election: Aberdeen North
Party	Candidate	Votes	%	±%
SNP	Kirsty Blackman	14,533	34.5	−18.4
Labour	Lynn Thomson	12,773	30.3	+18.3
Conservative	Gillian Tebberen	5,881	14.0	−10.5
Reform	Kenneth Leggat	3,781	9.0	+7.4
Liberal Democrats	Desmond Bouse	2,583	6.1	−1.6
Green	Esme Houston	1,275	3.0	+1.8
Alba	Charlie Abel	703	1.7	N/A
Scottish Family	Dawn Smith	352	0.8	N/A
TUSC	Lucas Grant	214	0.5	N/A
Majority		1,760	4.2	−24.1
Turnout		42,095	55.4	−9.8
SNP hold		Swing	−18.3	

=== Elections in the 2010s ===
2019 notional result (Note: Estimate of the 2019 general election result as if the revised boundaries recommended under the 2023 boundary review were in place)
Party	Vote	%
SNP	26,516	52.9
Conservative	12,306	24.5
Labour	6,005	12.0
Liberal Democrats	3,875	7.7
Brexit Party	813	1.6
Scottish Greens	612	1.2
Majority	14,210	28.3
Turnout	50,122	65.2
Electorate	75,655	

2019 general election: Aberdeen North
Party	Candidate	Votes	%	±%
SNP	Kirsty Blackman	20,205	54.0	+12.7
Conservative	Ryan Houghton	7,535	20.1	−2.6
Labour	Nurul Ali	4,939	13.2	−16.8
Liberal Democrats	Isobel Davidson	2,846	7.6	+3.0
Brexit Party	Sebastian Leslie	1,008	2.7	N/A
Green	Guy Ingerson	880	2.4	N/A
Majority		12,670	33.9	+22.6
Turnout		37,413	59.9	+0.7
Registered electors		62,489		
SNP hold		Swing	+7.7	

2017 general election: Aberdeen North
Party	Candidate	Votes	%	±%
SNP	Kirsty Blackman	15,170	41.3	−15.1
Labour	Orr Vinegold	11,031	30.0	+4.1
Conservative	Grace O'Keeffe	8,341	22.7	+10.6
Liberal Democrats	Isobel Davidson	1,693	4.6	−0.1
Independent	Richard Durkin	522	1.4	N/A
Majority		4,139	11.3	−19.2
Turnout		36,757	59.2	−5.7
Registered electors		62,130		
SNP hold		Swing	−9.6	

2015 general election: Aberdeen North
Party	Candidate	Votes	%	±%
SNP	Kirsty Blackman	24,793	56.4	+34.2
Labour	Richard Baker	11,397	25.9	−18.5
Conservative	Sanjoy Sen	5,304	12.1	−0.3
Liberal Democrats	Euan Davidson	2,050	4.7	−13.9
TUSC	Tyrinne Rutherford	206	0.5	N/A
National Front	Christopher Willett	186	0.4	N/A
Majority		13,396	30.5	N/A
Turnout		43,936	64.9	+6.7
Registered electors		67,745		
SNP gain from Labour		Swing	+26.4	

2010 general election: Aberdeen North
Party	Candidate	Votes	%	±%
Labour	Frank Doran	16,746	44.4	+1.9
SNP	Joanna Strathdee	8,385	22.2	−0.1
Liberal Democrats	Kristian Chapman	7,001	18.6	−5.3
Conservative	Stewart Whyte	4,666	12.4	+3.0
BNP	Roy Jones	635	1.7	N/A
Scottish Socialist	Ewan Robertson	268	0.7	−1.2
Majority		8,361	22.2	+3.6
Turnout		37,701	58.2	+2.5
Registered electors		64,808		
Labour hold		Swing	+1.0	

=== Elections in the 2000s ===
2005 general election: Aberdeen North
Party	Candidate	Votes	%	±%
Labour	Frank Doran	15,557	42.5	
Liberal Democrats	Steve Delaney	8,762	23.9	
SNP	Kevin Stewart	8,168	22.3	
Conservative	David Anderson	3,456	9.4	
Scottish Socialist	John Connon	691	1.9	
Majority		6,795	18.6	
Turnout		36,634	55.7	
Registered electors		65,714		
Labour hold		Swing		

2001 general election: Aberdeen North
Party	Candidate	Votes	%	±%
Labour	Malcolm Savidge	13,157	43.3	−4.6
SNP	Alasdair Allan	8,708	28.7	+6.9
Liberal Democrats	Jim Donaldson	4,991	16.4	+2.3
Conservative	Richard Cowling	3,047	10.0	−5.0
Scottish Socialist	Shona Foreman	454	1.5	N/A
Majority		4,449	14.6	−11.5
Turnout		30,357	57.4	−13.3
Registered electors		52,876		
Labour hold		Swing	−5.7	

=== Elections in the 1990s ===
1997 general election: Aberdeen North
Party	Candidate	Votes	%	±%
Labour	Malcolm Savidge	18,839	47.9	
SNP	Brian Adam	8,379	21.8	
Conservative	James Gifford	5,763	15.0	
Liberal Democrats	Mike Rumbles	5,421	14.1	
Referendum	Alasdair McKenzie	463	1.2	
Majority		10,010	26.1	
Turnout		38,865	70.7	
Labour hold		Swing		

1992 general election: Aberdeen North
Party	Candidate	Votes	%	±%
Labour	Robert Hughes	18,845	47.0	−7.7
SNP	James McGugan	9,608	24.0	+10.8
Conservative	Paul Cook	6,836	17.1	+2.8
Liberal Democrats	Martin Ford	4,772	11.9	−5.9
Majority		9,237	23.1	−13.8
Turnout		40,061	66.9	−3.0
Registered electors		60,217		
Labour hold		Swing	−9.2	

=== Elections in the 1980s ===
1987 general election: Aberdeen North
Party	Candidate	Votes	%	±%
Labour	Robert Hughes	24,145	54.7	+7.7
SDP	Robert Smith	7,867	17.8	−6.9
Conservative	Gae Scanlan	6,330	14.3	−3.8
SNP	Philip Greenhorn	5,827	13.2	+3.9
Majority		16,278	36.9	+14.6
Turnout		44,169	69.9	+4.9
Registered electors		63,214		
Labour hold		Swing	+1.0	

1983 general election: Aberdeen North
Party	Candidate	Votes	%	±%
Labour	Robert Hughes	19,262	47.0	
SDP	Colin Deans	10,118	24.7	
Conservative	Gae Scanlan	7,426	18.1	
SNP	James McGugan	3,790	9.3	
Ecology	Margaret Harty	67	0.9	
Majority		9,144	22.3	
Turnout		40,663	65.0	
Labour hold		Swing		

=== Elections in the 1970s ===
1979 general election: Aberdeen North
Party	Candidate	Votes	%	±%
Labour	Robert Hughes	26,771	59.3	+8.4
Conservative	Gordon Cassie Adams	7,657	17.0	+5.7
SNP	Maureen Watt	5,796	12.9	−16.8
Liberal	Lindsay Jane McMillan	4,887	10.8	+2.7
Majority		19,114	42.4	+21.2
Turnout		45,111	69.7	0.0
Registered electors		64,747		
Labour hold		Swing		

October 1974 general election: Aberdeen North
Party	Candidate	Votes	%	±%
Labour	Robert Hughes	23,130	50.9	+3.2
SNP	James Andrew McGugan	13,509	29.7	+6.4
Conservative	Peter Fraser	5,125	11.3	−5.4
Liberal	Forbes McCallum	3,700	8.1	−4.2
Majority		9,621	21.2	−3.2
Turnout		45,464	69.7	−5.9
Registered electors		65,230		
Labour hold		Swing		

February 1974 general election: Aberdeen North
Party	Candidate	Votes	%	±%
Labour	Robert Hughes	23,193	47.7	−14.4
SNP	James Andrew McGugan	11,337	23.3	+14.9
Conservative	G. Dunnett	8,115	16.7	−5.3
Liberal	Forbes McCallum	6,001	12.3	+5.9
Majority		11,856	24.4	−15.7
Turnout		48,646	75.6	+5.8
Registered electors		64,349		
Labour hold		Swing		

1970 general election: Aberdeen North
Party	Candidate	Votes	%	±%
Labour	Robert Hughes	27,707	62.1	−5.5
Conservative	Dennis J. Williams	9,807	22.0	+1.4
SNP	John McKenna	3,756	8.4	N/A
Liberal	Forbes McCallum	2,835	6.4	−3.8
Communist	Andrew Ingram	521	1.2	−0.5
Majority		17,900	40.1	−6.9
Turnout		44,626	69.8	−2.3
Registered electors		63,981		
Labour hold		Swing		

=== Elections in the 1960s ===
1966 general election: Aberdeen North
Party	Candidate	Votes	%	±%
Labour	Hector Hughes	28,799	67.6	−1.4
Conservative	Marcus Humphrey	8,768	20.6	−10.5
Liberal	Doreen W. MacPherson	4,350	10.2	N/A
Communist	Margaret Rose	719	1.7	N/A
Majority		20,031	47.0	+9.2
Turnout		42,636	72.1	−2.7
Registered electors		59,157		
Labour hold		Swing		

1964 general election: Aberdeen North
Party	Candidate	Votes	%	±%
Labour	Hector Hughes	31,844	68.9	+4.5
Unionist	John Mclnnes	14,366	31.1	+1.4
Majority		17,478	37.8	+3.1
Turnout		46,210	74.8	−1.9
Registered electors		61,776		
Labour hold		Swing		

=== Elections in the 1950s ===
1959 general election: Aberdeen North
Party	Candidate	Votes	%	±%
Labour	Hector Hughes	32,793	64.4	−2.6
Unionist	Jack Stewart-Clark	15,137	29.7	−3.3
SNP	Sandy Milne	2,964	5.8	N/A
Majority		17,656	34.7	+0.8
Turnout		50,894	76.7	+2.1
Registered electors		66,351		
Labour hold		Swing		

1955 general election: Aberdeen North
Party	Candidate	Votes	%	±%
Labour	Hector Hughes	33,153	67.0	
Unionist	Charles A. Malden	16,357	33.0	
Majority		16,796	33.9	
Turnout		49,510	74.6	
Labour hold		Swing		

1951 general election: Aberdeen North
Party	Candidate	Votes	%	±%
Labour	Hector Hughes	33,711	64.7	+4.2
Unionist	Frank Magee	18,365	35.3	+5.2
Majority		15,346	29.5	−0.9
Turnout		52,076	82.9	0.0
Registered electors		62,817		
Labour hold		Swing		

1950 general election: Aberdeen North
Party	Candidate	Votes	%	±%
Labour	Hector Hughes	31,594	60.5	
Unionist	Archibald Tennant	15,705	30.1	
Liberal	John Gray Wilson	3,574	6.8	
Communist	Bob Cooney	1,391	2.7	
Majority		15,889	30.4	
Turnout		50,873	82.9	
Labour hold		Swing		

=== Elections in the 1940s ===
1945 general election: Aberdeen North
Party	Candidate	Votes	%	±%
Labour	Hector Hughes	26,753	69.7	+21.0
Unionist	Lady Grant of Monymusk	9,623	25.1	−15.1
SNP	Austin William Walker	2,021	5.3	N/A
Majority		17,130	44.6	+35.1
Turnout		38,397	67.5	+1.6
Registered electors		56,904		
Labour hold		Swing		

=== Elections in the 1930s ===
1935 general election: Aberdeen North
Party	Candidate	Votes	%	±%
Labour	George Garro-Jones	16,952	48.7	+24.2
Unionist	John George Burnett	13,990	40.2	−24.1
Ind. Labour Party	Arthur Fraser Macintosh	3,871	11.1	N/A
Majority		2,962	8.5	N/A
Turnout		34,813	65.9	−7.5
Registered electors		52,858		
Labour gain from Unionist		Swing		

1931 general election: Aberdeen North
Party	Candidate	Votes	%	±%
Unionist	John George Burnett	22,931	64.3	N/A
Labour	William Wedgwood Benn	8,753	24.5	−36.3
Communist	Helen Crawfurd	3,980	11.2	+5.4
Majority		14,178	39.8	N/A
Turnout		35,664	73.4	+10.9
Unionist gain from Labour		Swing		

=== Elections in the 1920s ===
1929 general election: Aberdeen North
Party	Candidate	Votes	%	±%
Labour	William Wedgwood Benn	17,826	60.8	+0.02
Liberal	Reginald Berkeley	9,799	33.4	N/A
Communist	Aitken Ferguson	1,686	5.8	N/A
Majority		8,027	27.4	+5.8
Turnout		29,311	62.5	−1.9
Registered electors		46,934		
Labour hold		Swing		

1928 by-election: Aberdeen North
Party	Candidate	Votes	%	±%
Labour	William Wedgwood Benn	10,646	52.5	−8.3
Unionist	Laura Sandeman	4,696	23.1	−16.1
Communist	Aitken Ferguson	2,618	12.9	N/A
Liberal	James Rankin Rutherford	2,337	11.5	N/A
Majority		5,950	29.4	+7.8
Turnout		20,297	56.8	−7.6
Registered electors		35,738		
Labour hold		Swing	+3.9	

1924 general election: Aberdeen North
Party	Candidate	Votes	%	±%
Labour	Frank Rose	13,249	60.8	+10.2
Unionist	Laura Sandeman	8,545	39.2	+12.5
Majority		4,704	21.6	−2.3
Turnout		21,794	64.4	+11.4
Registered electors		33,826		
Labour hold		Swing	−1.2	

1923 general election: Aberdeen North
Party	Candidate	Votes	%	±%
Labour	Frank Rose	9,138	50.6	−5.1
Unionist	William Forbes Lumsden	4,820	26.7	N/A
Liberal	William Mackenzie Cameron	4,099	22.7	+12.0
Majority		4,318	23.9	+1.8
Turnout		18,057	53.0	−3.9
Registered electors		34,098		
Labour hold		Swing	+2.9	

1922 general election: Aberdeen North
Party	Candidate	Votes	%	±%
Labour	Frank Rose	10,958	55.7	+4.8
National Liberal	William Mackenzie Cameron	6,615	33.6	N/A
Liberal	James Johnstone	2,113	10.7	−38.4
Majority		4,343	22.1	+20.3
Turnout		19,686	56.9	+20.5
Registered electors		34,603		
Labour hold		Swing		

=== Elections in the 1910s ===
1918 general election: Aberdeen North
Party	Candidate	Votes	%
Labour	Frank Rose	6,128	50.9
Liberal	Duncan Pirie*	5,918	49.1
Majority		210	1.8
Turnout		12,046	36.4
Registered electors			
Labour win (new boundaries)			

*Pirie was endorsed by the Coalition Government but refused to give it his support.

December 1910 general election: Aberdeen North
Party	Candidate	Votes	%	±%
Liberal	Duncan Pirie	4,282	62.7	+8.7
Liberal Unionist	Robert Scott-Brown	2,546	37.3	+8.2
Majority		1,736	25.4	+0.5
Turnout		6,828	66.0	−11.0
Registered electors		10,341		
Liberal hold		Swing	+0.3	

January 1910 general election: Aberdeen North
Party	Candidate	Votes	%	±%
Liberal	Duncan Pirie	4,297	54.0	−8.8
Liberal Unionist	Robert Scott-Brown	2,314	29.1	+17.0
Social Democratic Federation	Tom Kennedy	1,344	16.9	−8.2
Majority		1,983	24.9	−12.8
Turnout		7,955	77.0	+3.7
Registered electors		10,331		
Liberal hold		Swing	−12.9	

=== Elections in the 1900s ===
1906 general election: Aberdeen North
Party	Candidate	Votes	%	±%
Liberal	Duncan Pirie	4,852	62.8	−2.5
Social Democratic Federation	Tom Kennedy	1,935	25.1	N/A
Conservative	Maltman Barrie	931	12.1	−22.6
Majority		2,917	37.7	+7.1
Turnout		7,718	73.3	+8.7
Registered electors		10,531		
Liberal hold		Swing	+10.1	

1900 general election: Aberdeen North
Party	Candidate	Votes	%	±%
Liberal	Duncan Pirie	4,238	65.3	−21.9
Conservative	Robert Williams	2,251	34.7	N/A
Majority		1,987	30.6	−43.8
Turnout		6,489	64.6	+13.5
Registered electors		10,047		
Liberal hold		Swing		

=== Elections in the 1890s ===
Pirie

1896 by-election: Aberdeen North
Party	Candidate	Votes	%	±%
Liberal	Duncan Pirie	2,909	54.0	−33.2
Ind. Labour Party	Tom Mann	2,479	46.0	N/A
Majority		430	8.0	−66.4
Turnout		5,388	57.1	+6.0
Registered electors		9,434		
Liberal hold		Swing		

William Hunter

1895 general election: Aberdeen North
Party	Candidate	Votes	%	±%
Liberal	William Hunter	4,156	87.2	+3.5
Independent Labour	John Lincoln Mahon	608	12.8	N/A
Majority		3,548	74.4	+7.0
Turnout		4,764	51.1	−9.3
Registered electors		9,318		
Liberal hold		Swing		

1892 general election: Aberdeen North
Party	Candidate	Votes	%	±%
Liberal	William Hunter	4,462	83.7	N/A
Liberal Unionist	Bremner Patrick Lee	870	16.3	N/A
Majority		3,592	67.4	N/A
Turnout		5,332	60.4	N/A
Registered electors		8,832		
Liberal hold		Swing	N/A	

=== Elections in the 1880s ===
1886 general election: Aberdeen North
Party	Candidate	Votes	%	±%
Liberal	William Hunter	Unopposed		
Liberal hold				

1885 general election: Aberdeen North
Party	Candidate	Votes	%
Liberal	William Hunter	4,794	81.8
Conservative	Benjamin McGeagh	894	15.2
Independent Liberal	James Thom	177	3.0
Majority		3,900	66.6
Turnout		5,865	71.0
Registered electors		8,256	
Liberal win (new seat)			
