= Duncan Pirie =

British politician (1858–1931)

Duncan Pirie OBE

Member of Parliament for Aberdeen North
- In office 1 May 1896 – 25 November 1918
- Preceded by: William Hunter
- Succeeded by: Frank Rose

Personal details
- Born: 22 March 1858 Aberdeen, Scotland
- Died: 11 January 1931 (aged 72) Varennes-en-Argonne, France
- Party: Liberal
- Education: Trinity College, Glenalmond Clifton College
- Military career
- Allegiance: United Kingdom
- Branch: British Army
- Service years: 1879–1898, 1914–1918
- Rank: Lieutenant-Colonel
- Conflicts: Anglo-Egyptian War; Second Boer War; First World War

Duncan Vernon Pirie OBE, FRSGS, JP, DL (22 March 1858 – 11 January 1931) was a Scottish Liberal Party politician who served as MP for Aberdeen North for 22 years.

== Background and education ==
Duncan Pirie was born in Aberdeen in 1858, the eldest of the six children of Gordon Pirie, of Château de Varennes, France, and Valentine, daughter of Comte J. Rousseau de Labrosse. His younger brother, Arthur Murray Pirie, DSO served with the 21st (Empress of India's) Lancers and was killed in World War I. He was educated at Trinity College, Glenalmond and at Clifton College. As a young man he joined the Royal Aberdeenshire Highland Militia, based at the King Street Barracks.

== Military career ==
In 1879, Pirie obtained a commission to the 1st Dragoon Guards as a second-lieutenant, but was transferred to the 7th Dragoon Guards shortly afterwards and spent time stationed in Aldershot and Norwich. In 1881 he was promoted to lieutenant and was transferred to the 4th Dragoons a year later. He was stationed in Egypt during the Anglo-Egyptian war of July–September 1882, serving as an extra Aide de Camp to Sir Gerald Graham. He was consequently commended in despatches, and awarded the Egypt Medal, presented to him in 1883 at a royal levee at St James Palace, overseen by the Prince of Wales. He was exchanged to the 1st Life Guards later that year.

Pirie was responsible for overseeing the delivery of a fleet of 44 boats for the Nile Expedition in 1884, in which he participated (including the battle of Kirbekan), as well as the Sudan campaign, seeing action in the battles of Teb and Tamai. He was again mentioned in despatches in 1885, whiles stationed in Egypt. While there, he was promoted to captain in the 5th (Royal Irish) Lancers and was stationed in Ireland upon his return. Another transfer, to the 3rd (Kings Own) Hussars occurred in 1888. In April 1890, Pirie was appointed as ADC to the Governor of Ceylon, Arthur Havelock, a position he held until he resigned from the role in 1893, when he returned to the 3rd Hussars in Ireland. Pirie officially resigned from the military in 1898, having been seconded after his successful election bid in 1896. Despite this, he returned to the military on two occasions, first serving in South Africa in the Remounts Department during the Second Boer War in 1900, and then again following the outbreak of World War I, between 1914 and 1918. During this time he was appointed as a Railway Transport Officer and later an assistant Military Landing Officer. In 1916 he was appointed temp. Major of 1st (Garrison) Battalion, Suffolk Regiment. He was later promoted to lieutenant-colonel, before retiring once more after the end of the war. In 1900, Pirie was appointed a deputy lieutenant of Aberdeen, a role he held until 1921.

== Political career ==
Pirie's first foray into politics was an unsuccessful bid as the Liberal candidate for West Renfrewshire at the 1895 general election. A year later, the resignation of William Hunter led to a by-election for the constituency of Aberdeen North. Pirie stood again as a Liberal candidate, and was elected. He would go on to serve as MP for 22 years, before losing the seat to Frank Rose in December 1918.

During his time in Parliament, Pirie came into prominence following his successful introduction of the Education (Scotland) bill in 1901, which raised the country's school leaving age from 12 to 14. He also played a part in the successful prevention of a proposal for seven-day newspapers in London in 1899.

== Personal life and honours ==
In 1894 Pirie married Hon. Evelyn Forbes, daughter of William Forbes-Sempill, 17th Lord Sempill, in Knightsbridge. The couple had three sons and three daughters.

During his time as an MP, the family usually split their time between Aberdeen, London and the family chateau in France. Both Pirie's Aberdeen and French homes were damaged by major fires in 1899 and 1905 respectively. In the case of the Aberdeen mansion, the building was destroyed, while Château de Varennes was restored, and remained in the family until the 1960s.

Pirie retired from politics following the end of World War I, and spent much of the remainder of his life in both Aberdeen and at the chateau in France, where he died following a weeks illness in January 1931, aged 72.

Following his service in WWI, Pirie was made an OBE in 1918, along with being awarded the Serbian Order of the White Eagle. In 1919 he was appointed an officer of the Greek Order of the Redeemer

Parliament of the United Kingdom
Preceded by William Hunter	Member of Parliament for Aberdeen North; 1896–1918	Succeeded by Frank Rose
