= William Hunter (Aberdeen MP) =

William Alexander Hunter

William Alexander Hunter (8 May 1844 – 21 July 1898) was a Scottish jurist and Liberal politician.

Hunter was born in Aberdeen, the son of James Hunter, a granite merchant, of Aberdeen. He was educated at Aberdeen grammar school and university. He entered the Middle Temple, and was called to the English bar in 1867, but then was occupied mainly with teaching. In 1869 he was appointed professor of Roman law at University College London, and in 1878 professor of jurisprudence, resigning that chair in 1882.

Hunter's name became well known during this period as the author of a standard work on Roman law, Roman Law in the Order of a Code, together with a smaller introductory volume for students, Introduction to Roman Law.

After 1882 Hunter took up politics and was elected to parliament for Aberdeen North as a Liberal at the 1885 general election. In the House of Commons he was a prominent supporter of Charles Bradlaugh; he was the first to advocate old age pensions, and in 1890 carried a proposal to free elementary education in Scotland. In 1895 his health broke down; he resigned his seat in Parliament on 24 April 1896 by taking the Chiltern Hundreds.

Parliament of the United Kingdom
New constituency	Member of Parliament for Aberdeen North; 1885 – 1896	Succeeded by Duncan Pirie
Media offices
Preceded by Fox Bourne	Editor of the Weekly Dispatch; 1883–1892?	Succeeded by Frank Smith
