= Deputy Lieutenant of Aberdeen =

Deputy lieutenants of Aberdeen are commissioned by the Lord Provost of Aberdeen who, since 1899 by virtue of office, is also Lord-Lieutenant of Aberdeen.

The Lieutenancy Area of Aberdeen City was formerly known as the County of the City of Aberdeen - not to be confused with the County of Aberdeen, which is now known as Aberdeenshire.

== 19th Century ==
- 12 January 1900: Alexander George Pirie, Chairman of Stoneywood Paper Mill
- 12 January 1900: Alexander Milne Ogston
- 12 January 1900: Thomas Ogilvie
- 12 January 1900: James Murray
- 12 January 1900: Daniel Mearns
- 12 January 1900: Alexander Lyon Jnr.
- 12 January 1900: Colonel Thomas Innes
- 12 January 1900: Robert Henderson
- 12 January 1900: Alexander Morison Gordon
- 12 January 1900: Alexander Ogston Gill
- 12 January 1900: John Fyfe
- 12 January 1900: Theodore Crombie
- 12 January 1900: Duncan Vernon Pirie
- 12 January 1900: Sir David Stewart former Provost of Aberdeen
- 12 January 1900: Sir William Henderson
- 12 January 1900: Sir Alexander Baird
- 12 January 1900: Sir John Forbes Clark
- 12 January 1900: James Bryce, 1st Viscount Bryce
- 12 January 1900: John Hamilton-Gordon, 1st Marquess of Aberdeen and Temair
- 12 January 1900: Charles Gordon, 11th Marquess of Huntly

== 20th century ==
- 11 October 1905: William Meff jun.
- 11 October 1905: Sir James Taggart
- 10 September 1908: Sir John Fleming
- 10 September 1908: Colonel James Ogston
- 29 November 1910: Colonel Lachlan Mackinnon, Advocate
- 27 October 1911: Major General Sir Alexander John Forsyth Reid
- 26 April 1912: Alexander Wilson
- 28 July 1915: Norman Buchan, 18th Earl of Caithness
- 28 July 1915: Weetman Pearson, 1st Baron Cowdray
- 28 July 1915: Major General Sir James Ronald Leslie Macdonald
- 28 July 1915: Harold John Tennant
- 28 July 1915: John Turner
- 21 September 1917: Lieutenant-Colonel Sir Arthur Grant, 10th Baronet
- 21 September 1917: Colonel William Andrew Mellis
- 21 September 1917: Lieutenant-Colonel James Ochoncar Forbes
- 5 August 1918: George Bennett Mitchell
- 23 January 1920: Major William Yeats McDonald
- 10 September 1925: Commander Wilfrid Bayley Pirie
- 10 September 1925: Colonel Macbeth Moir Duncan
- 10 September 1925: Colonel William Smith Gill
- 10 September 1925: Colonel Thomas Ogilvie
- 10 September 1925: Colonel John Scott Riddell
- 2 August 1926: Lieutenant Harry Alexander Holmes
- 11 February 1928: Robert Williams
- 28 May 1928: Colonel Frederick Richard Gerrard Forsyth
- 4 December 1929: Colonel Harry Jackson Kinghorn
- 4 December 1929: Sir Andrew Jopp Williams Lewis
- 5 April 1930: Colonel Frank Fleming
- 5 April 1930: Sir John Marnoch
- 16 February 1932: John Malcolm Fyfe
- 18 October 1932: John Reid Dean
- 15 February 1933: James Reid Rust
- 30 March 1935: Archibald Gordon, 5th Marquess of Aberdeen and Temair, OBE
- 30 March 1935: Colonel Thomas Fraser
- 19 November 1935: Captain James Hay
- 19 November 1935: Major Malcolm Vivian Hay
- 14 January 1936: Henry Alexander
- 15 December 1938: Lieutenant-Colonel Edward William Watt
- 15 December 1938: Major Alexander Lyon
- 15 December 1938: James Dawson
- 8 April 1952: Lieutenant-Colonel Samuel McDonald, honorary Sheriff-substitute of Angus and Forfar, Sheriff-substitute of Hamilton, Sheriff-substitute of Arbroath, Sheriff-substitute of Aberdeen, Kincardine and Banff, Sheriff Substitute of Lanarkshire.
- 8 April 1952: Duncan Fraser
- 8 April 1952: Sir Alexander Greig Anderson
- 6 July 1953: William David Reid
- 30 August 1956: Lieutenant Athol Benzie
- 30 August 1956: Reverend Professor John Macdonald Graham
- 30 August 1956: Colonel Edward Birnie Reid
- 12 May 1959: Honorary Colonel Roy Brown Strathdee, OBE
- 12 May 1959: Honorary Colonel Alexander Milne
- 12 May 1959: Lieutenant-Colonel Lachlan Mackinnon
- 17 April 1964: George Stephen
- 17 April 1964: Lieutenant-Colonel James Shankley
- 17 April 1964: Lieutenant-Colonel Thomas Patrick Edward Murray}
- 17 April 1964: Captain James Scott Gray Munro
- 17 April 1964: John Cecil King
- 17 April 1964: Lieutenant-Colonel Douglas Edmond
- 17 April 1964: Sir Ian Robert Algernon Forbes-Leith of Fyvie
- 27 September 1965: Reverend Professor John Macdonald Graham
- 1 May 1967: James Campbell Williamson
- 1 May 1967: Colonel Alexander Logie Stalker
- 1 May 1967: William Ranald Stewart Mellis
- 1 May 1967: Lieutenant Richard Tunstall Ellis
- 1 May 1967: Squadron Leader James Downie Campbell
- 1 May 1967: Dr Logie Samuel Bain
- 1 December 1970: Norman Hogg, Baron Hogg of Cumbernauld
- 31 May 1978: Lieutenant James Fergus Watt
- 31 May 1978: Frank Ramsay
- 31 May 1978: Major David Maxwell Procter
- 31 May 1978: Captain Kenneth Jamieson Peters}
- 31 May 1978: Lieutenant-Colonel Charles John Howell Mann
- 31 May 1978: Lieutenant Joseph Robert Carry
- 10 December 1992: Charles Leslie Robertson
- 20 December 1993: William Wyllie (Appointed Vice Lord-Lieutenant 2004)
- 12 September 1995: James Alexander Lamond
- 12 September 1995: Audrey Anne Dawson
- 12 September 1995: Alan John Codona
- 29 April 1999: Philip Kivuva Muinde
- 29 April 1999: Alison Skene (Appointed Vice Lord-Lieutenant on 4 January 2007)

== 21st century ==
- 17 April 2003: Andrew Lawtie Appointed Vice Lord-Lieutenant on 3 September 2015.
- 17 April 2003: Lavina Massie
- 3 March 2005: Michael C. Hastie
- 3 March 2005: Roy Hendry Thomson
- 3 March 2005: Jennifer A. Shirreffs
- 3 March 2005: Joseph Leiper
- 4 January 2007: John L. Langler
- 17 January 2007: James Smith Milne
- 7 December 2007: Forbes McCallum
- 17 April 2008: Margurita Esson
- 17 April 2008: Audrey Walker
- 23 April 2010: Dennis Davidson
- 16 March 2012: Beverley Graham
- 5 December 2013: Sir Ian Diamond, Principal and Vice-Chancellor of the University of Aberdeen
- 20 April 2015: Gregory Poon
- 17 November 2015: Lady (Joan) Catto
- 19 December 2017: William Young, former Aberdeen City Councillor
- 19 December 2017: Isabel McIntyre
- December 2019: Gillian Milne
- December 2019: Graham Guyan
- November 2021: Avril Gray
- November 2021: Mike Melvin
- November 2021: Margaret Openshaw
- May 2022: Gail Mair
- December 2024: Myles Edwards
- December 2024: Graeme Kinghorn
- December 2024: Morven Mackenzie
- December 2024: Ian Ord
- December 2024: Rita Stephen
- December 2024: Dr Hector Williams
