= John George Burnett =

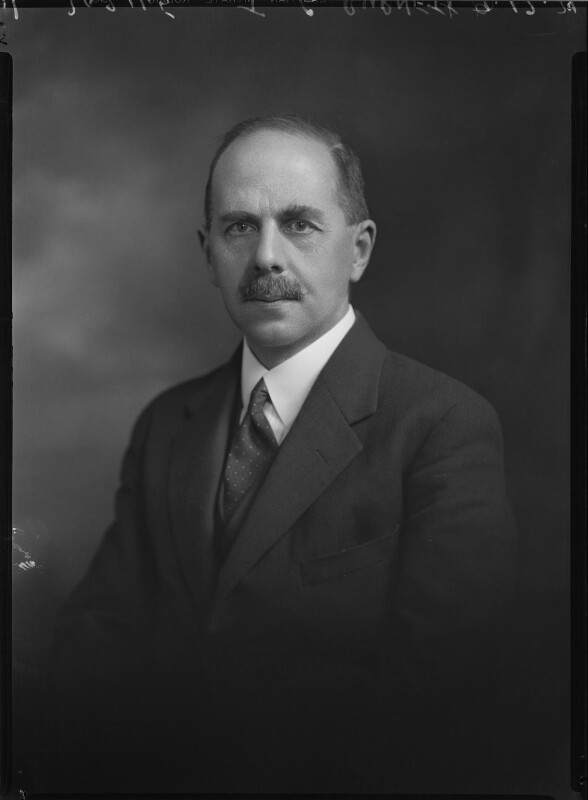
Burnett

John George Burnett, OBE (30 March 1876 – 20 January 1962) was Unionist MP for Aberdeen North from 1931 to 1935, defeating William Wedgwood Benn at the 1931 general election.

The son of Dr George Burnett, sometime Lord Lyon King of Arms, he was educated at Trinity College, Glenalmond and Magdalen College, Oxford. he was subsequently called to the English bar by the Inner Temple.

He was secretary of the Aberdeen War Pensions Committee from 1915 to 1920 and a member of the Aberdeen Town Council from 1928 to 1931. He became a member of the Scottish Departmental Committee on Housing.

He was appointed an OBE in the 1946 New Year Honours for his services as County Army Welfare Officer for Aberdeenshire and Kincardineshire.

General election 1931: Aberdeen North Electorate
Party	Candidate	Votes	%	±%
Unionist	John George Burnett	22,931		
Labour	William Wedgwood Benn	8,853		
Communist	H. Crawford	3,980		
Majority				
Turnout				
Unionist gain from Labour		Swing		

He lost his seat in 1935 to Mr George M. Garro-Jones (Labour)

General election 1935: Aberdeen North Electorate
Party	Candidate	Votes	%	±%
Labour	George Garro-Jones	16,952		
Unionist	John George Burnett	13,990		
Ind. Labour Party	A. F. Macintosh	3,871		
Majority				
Turnout				
Labour gain from Unionist		Swing		

Parliament of the United Kingdom
Preceded by William Wedgwood Benn	Member of Parliament for Aberdeen North; 1931 – 1935	Succeeded by George Garro-Jones
