= Mary Paterson =

British factory inspector and philanthropist

- Born: 23 June 1864; Glasgow, United Kingdom of Great Britain and Ireland
- Died: 10 June 1941 (aged 76); Lasswade, Scotland
- Education: Queen Margaret College
- Occupation: factory inspector
- Known for: first woman to prosecute a case in Scotland

Mary Muirhead Paterson (23 June 1864 – 10 June 1941) was a British factory inspector and philanthropist. She was one of the first two women factory inspectors and the first woman to prosecute in a Scottish court.

== Life ==
Paterson was born in Glasgow in 1864 into a prosperous family. Her parents were Gavin and Annie Paterson. She obtained a first-class education in Scotland but she was not awarded a degree, as women were not allowed to graduate. She had been one of the first women to be admitted to Queen Margaret College in Glasgow. She took an interest in the conditions that employees had to work in and under her own steam she researched the contemporary conditions in Scotland, Canada and the United States. She went to America with her uncle, Dr Henry Muirhead. Her uncle was a strong supporter of women's education and he left an endowment for that purpose when he died.

In 1893 she and May Tennant were the first two women to become factory inspectors earning £200 a year. They were known as "Lady Inspectors" and they were employed in a special department and paid less than their male counterparts. Factory Inspectors had existed since 1833 but for the first sixty years they were all men. This was a powerful role giving them authority over factory managers and owners. Women were appointed to these jobs because of pressure from trade unions and from a Royal Commission which recommended that women should take on this role. Her job involved enforcing the Truck Act which obliged employers to pay their workers in cash. She was promoted in 1903 and again in 1906 when she was also moved to London.

She was the first woman to prosecute in a Scottish court.

In 1911 the National Insurance Act was passed that established a link between government and private insurance companies. Paterson became a national health insurance commissioner for Scotland in 1912. She was one of the first people appointed and she worked in that role until 1919. During World War I, Paterson also served as secretary of the Scottish Committee on Women's Employment, and visited Dundee where she was impressed by the volunteers of the Dundee Women's War Relief Executive Committee's led by Mary H. J. Henderson, included setting up a toy factory which employed and trained women and also made grant payments to unemployed women.

Paterson died at her home in Lasswade in 1941.
