= George Trefgarne, 1st Baron Trefgarne =

Welsh Baron

The Right Honourable The Lord Trefgarne
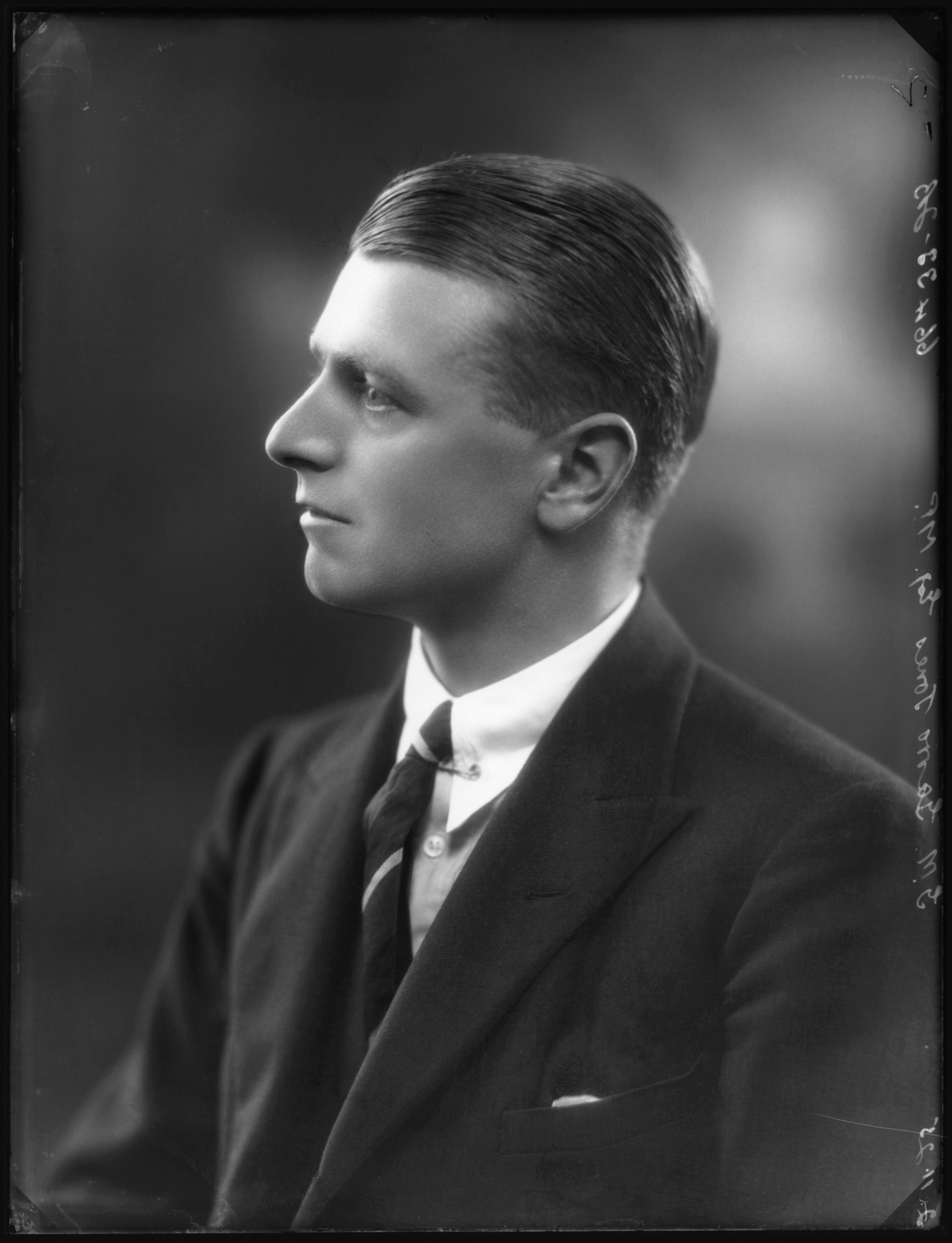

Member of the House of Lords Lord Temporal
- In office 21 January 1947 – 27 September 1960; Hereditary peerage
- Preceded by: Peerage created
- Succeeded by: The 2nd Baron Trefgarne

Member of Parliament
- In office 14 November 1935 – 15 June 1945
- Preceded by: John George Burnett
- Succeeded by: Hector Hughes
- Constituency: Aberdeen North
- In office 29 October 1924 – 10 May 1929
- Preceded by: Herbert Morrison
- Succeeded by: Herbert Morrison
- Constituency: Hackney South

Personal details
- Born: George Garro-Jones; 14 September 1894 Haverfordwest, Wales
- Died: 27 September 1960 (aged 66)
- Party: Labour; Liberal (before 1929)
- Children: David
- Education: Caterham School
- Occupation: Politician; barrister; businessman; editor

George Morgan Trefgarne, 1st Baron Trefgarne (né George Garro-Jones; 14 September 1894 – 27 September 1960), was a Welsh Liberal and later Labour politician, barrister, businessman and editor of the Daily Dispatch.

== Background ==
George Garro-Jones was born in Haverfordwest, Wales, on 14 September 1894. He was a "child of the Manse" as his father was the Congregationalist Minister at Zion's Hill Chapel, Spittal. His father, Reverend David Garro-Jones, trained for the ministry at Brecon College and served Congregational churches across Wales. The walk from the Manse in Spittal towards Zion's Hill chapel has views across a deep gorge to Treffgarne Rocks and it is understood this is where the titled name of Lord Trefgarne originated.

From 1906 to 1911, Garro-Jones attended Caterham.

== Political career ==
Garro-Jones was private secretary to Sir Hamar Greenwood from 1919 to 1922 while Greenwood was firstly Secretary for Overseas Trade and then Chief Secretary for Ireland. Greenwood was a Liberal Minister in the Coalition Government led by David Lloyd George.

This close association led Garro-Jones into standing as a candidate for National Liberals at the 1922 general election. He was selected to contest Bethnal Green North East, where the sitting Liberal member, who also supported the Coalition Government, was retiring. However, Garro-Jones's task of holding the seat became harder when the National Liberals coalition partners, the Unionists, decided to end the coalition and he found a Unionist intervening against him. To make matters worse, he could not count on the support of the local Liberal Association when an opposition Liberal supporter of H. H. Asquith also entered the contest. As a result, he was listed last in the election results.

After the election, the divisions in the Liberal ranks between the supporters of Asquith and Lloyd George was healed. Garro-Jones was chosen as a Liberal candidate at the 1923 general election for the Unionist seat of Hackney South. No Liberal candidate had fought in the constituency at the previous election, so it was not considered a particularly good prospect. The Labour candidate won, but Garro-Jones was still able to poll more votes than the sitting member who came third.

Garro-Jones only had to wait another year for the opportunity to stand for parliament again. Once again, he was chosen as the Liberal candidate for Hackney South. However, this time, there was no Unionist candidate, and he was able to gain the seat from his Labour opponent.

His victory was rare in an election which saw a very many Liberals lose their seats. He stood down at the 1929 election and shortly afterwards joined the Labour Party. He was elected Labour MP for Aberdeen North at the 1935 general election, holding the seat until 1945.

Garro-Jones was raised to the peerage as Baron Trefgarne, of Cleddau in the County of Pembroke, on 21 January 1947. In 1954, he assumed by deed poll the surname of Trefgarne in lieu of his patronymic. He was succeeded by his son David, a Conservative government minister.

== Electoral history ==
General election 1922: Bethnal Green North East
Party	Candidate	Votes	%	±%
Liberal	Garnham Edmonds	5,774	36.1	New
Communist	Walter Windsor	5,659	35.3	New
Unionist	Eric Alfred Hoffgaard	2,806	17.5	New
National Liberal	George Garro-Jones	1,780	11.5	−44.9
Majority		115	0.8	−26.3
Turnout		27,262	58.8	+27.6
Liberal gain from National Liberal		Swing	N/A	

General election 1923: Hackney South
Party	Candidate	Votes	%	±%
Labour	Herbert Morrison	9,578	42.8	+3.0
Liberal	George Garro-Jones	6,757	30.2	New
Unionist	Clifford Erskine-Bolst	6,047	27.0	−33.2
Majority		2,821	12.6	N/A
Turnout		22,382	65.8	−4.2
Registered electors		34,037		
Labour gain from Unionist		Swing	+18.1	

General election 1924: Hackney South
Party	Candidate	Votes	%	±%
Liberal	George Garro-Jones	13,415	53.5	+23.3
Labour	Herbert Morrison	11,651	46.5	+3.7
Majority		1,764	7.0	N/A
Turnout		25,066	72.5	+6.7
Registered electors		34,565		
Liberal gain from Labour		Swing	+9.8	

Coat of arms of George Trefgarne, 1st Baron Trefgarne
Coronet That of a British Baron. Crest On a mount Vert a tree Proper suspended therefrom an escutcheon Or charged with a portcullis Gules. Escutcheon Or a dragon rampant Gules over all on a bend Azure a leek of the first between two thistles Proper. Supporters On either side a Herefordshire bull charged on the shoulder with an escutcheon Or thereon a portcullis Azure. Motto Ratione Et Concillio

Parliament of the United Kingdom
Preceded by Herbert Morrison	Member of Parliament for Hackney South; 1924–1929	Succeeded by Herbert Morrison
Preceded by John George Burnett	Member of Parliament for Aberdeen North; 1935–1945	Succeeded by Hector Hughes
Peerage of the United Kingdom
New creation	Baron Trefgarne; 1947–1960	Succeeded by David Trefgarne
