= 1928 Aberdeen North by-election =

UK parliamentary by-election

William Wedgwood Benn

The 1928 Aberdeen North by-election was held on Thursday, 16 August 1928. The by-election was held due to the death of the incumbent Labour MP, Frank Herbert Rose. It was won by the Labour candidate William Wedgwood Benn. The by-election was one of the first elections in the UK where a Communist candidate stood against Labour since Comintern had abandoned its policy of entryism, with the candidacy of Aitken Ferguson, a member of the local Trades Council, who had been the Labour candidate in the 1924 Glasgow Kelvingrove by-election.

By-election, Aug 1928: Aberdeen North Electorate
Party	Candidate	Votes	%	±%
Labour	William Wedgwood Benn	10,646	52.5	−8.3
Unionist	Laura Sandeman	4,696	23.1	−16.1
Communist	Aitken Ferguson	2,618	12.9	New
Liberal	James Rankin Rutherford	2,337	11.5	New
Majority		5,950	29.4	+7.8
Turnout		20,297	56.8	−7.6
Labour hold		Swing	+3.9	
