= Laura Sandeman =

Scottish doctor and activist

Laura Stewart Sandeman
- Born: 1862; Bradshaw, Lancashire, England
- Died: 22 February 1929 (aged 66–67); Aberdeen, Scotland
- Education: University of Edinburgh
- Occupation: physician

Laura Stewart Sandeman (1862 – 22 February 1929) was a Scottish medical doctor and political activist.

== Early life and education ==
Laura Stewart Sandeman was born in 1862 in Bradshaw, Lancashire, the eldest daughter of Colonel Frank Stewart Sandeman. She grew up in Stanley, Perthshire, where her father owned a mill. One of her brothers was Nairne Stewart Sandeman who later became a Member of Parliament, and another was the lawyer Condie Sandeman.

Sandeman studied medicine at the University of Edinburgh, receiving a Bachelor of Medicine, Bachelor of Surgery in 1900, and became a Doctor of Medicine in 1903.

== Career ==
She began working as a general practitioner in Aberdeen, focusing on the health of the city's working class, and developed an interest in social work.

In 1915, she was the first Chief Medical Officer of the Scottish Women's Hospitals for Foreign Service in Troyes, alongside Louise McIlroy. She was next appointed to the Royal Army Medical Corps, with the title of Controller of Medical Services (Overseas). However, she refused to take up the post on the grounds that her pay would be 60% less than she could earn as a general practitioner, and was less than a man with the same rank. She finally took up the position in 1917, and was given responsibility for operations in France. She was known for avoiding wearing a military uniform, instead working in a skirt, shirt and tie.

After the World War I, Sandeman returned to Scotland where for some years she worked at the Dundee workhouse. She became active in the Unionist Party, standing for the party in Aberdeen North at the 1924 United Kingdom general election, and again at a 1928 by-election, taking second place to Labour Party candidates on both occasions.

Sandeman also served on the Scottish Board of Health Consultative Council.

== Death ==
On 22 February 1929 she died of pneumonia in Aberdeen. Mary H. J. Henderson, administrator of the Scottish Women's Hospitals in Serbia, and a war poet, paid a tribute to Sandeman, along with Dr. Elsie Inglis, founder of Scottish Women's Hospitals, in Magdalene in her 1929 book, Warp and Woof, when saying:

'The hands indeed,

which minister where there was need;

The hands we loved, may not touch ours again,

May not alleviate our mortal pain,

They lie quiescent in the hands of God'
