= William Meff =

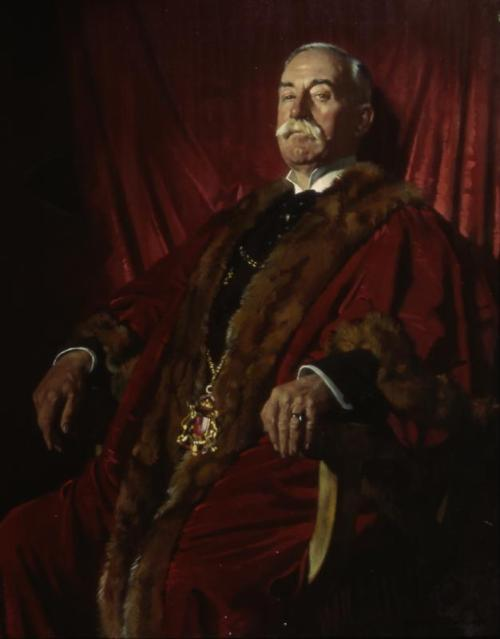
Sir William Meff, Lord Provost Of Aberdeen (1919 - 1925), by Sir William Orpen

Sir William Meff (1861–1935) was a Scottish businessman who served as Lord Provost of Aberdeen 1919 to 1925.

== Life ==
He was born in Aberdeen on 9 May 1861 the son of William Meff, a fishmonger. By 1870 his father is described as a "fish and game dealer" and held three adjacent units at the Market in Aberdeen whilst living at Elm Cottage in the Ruthrieston district of Aberdeen.

By around 1890 Meff controlled a large fleet of trawlers based in Aberdeen. As "Meff Brothers" he ran a wholesale fishmonger from Commercial Road and Albert Quay, living at that time at 40 Fonthill Road.

In 1905 he was appointed Deputy Lieutenant of Aberdeen.

He served as German Consul.

He was elected Lord Provost of Aberdeen in 1919 and served until 1925.

He died at Fordbank, Riverside Drive in Aberdeen on 31 July 1935 and was buried in Allenvale Cemetery in the south of the city. He left £54,115 in his will. This included a gift of £1000 to Aberdeen Royal Infirmary.

== Family ==
In 1886 he was married to Jane Barbara Blann (1867-1933). Their only son William Blann Meff served as a lieutenant in the Gordon Highlanders in the First World War and was killed at Beaumont Hamel on 14 November 1916. His medals are displayed in Aberdeen Art Gallery and Museum.

== Artistic recognition ==
He was portrayed in 1925 by Sir William Orpen. The picture is held by Aberdeen Art Gallery and Museum.

Civic offices
Preceded by Sir James Taggart	Lord Provost of Aberdeen; 1919–1925	Succeeded by Andrew J. W. Lewis
