= Frederick Whymper (cricketer) =

English cricketer and civil servant

Personal information
- Full name: Frederick Hayes Whymper
- Born: 14 October 1827; Westminster, Middlesex, England
- Died: 24 February 1893 (aged 65); Chelsea, London, England
- Batting: Unknown

Domestic team information
- Years: Team
- 1849–1852: Cambridge University
- 1851: Marylebone Cricket Club

Career statistics
Competition	First-class
Matches	8
Runs scored	60
Batting average	7.50
100s/50s	–/–
Top score	18*
Catches/stumpings	5/–
- Source: Cricinfo, 11 July 2022

Frederick Hayes Whymper (14 October 1827 – 24 February 1893) was an English civil servant and a cricketer who played in eight first-class cricket matches for Cambridge University and other amateur sides between 1849 and 1852. He was born at Westminster and died at Chelsea, both in London.

Whymper was educated at Eton College and at Trinity College, Cambridge. He played cricket as a middle- or lower-order batsman at Eton and appeared twice in the annual Eton v Harrow cricket match. At Cambridge, he played several times for the university side in 1849 without ever making much impact, sometimes batting as low as No 11; despite an unimpressive record, he was picked for the 1849 University Match against Oxford University, when he made 7 and 5 in his two innings. After 1849, he played only single first-class matches in each of the next three seasons. While at Cambridge, Whymper was also reported to have been involved in the formulation of the Cambridge rules of 1848 for football.

Whymper graduated from Cambridge University in 1851 with a Bachelor of Arts degree, being placed third in the Classics Tripos list for his year; earlier, he had been awarded the Craven Scholarship. He was admitted as a lawyer at Lincoln's Inn in 1851, but then pursued a career as a factory inspector, responsible for the enforcement of workplace safety and employment law under the various Factories Acts. He was Superintending Inspector first at Bristol, covering the south-west of England, and then for Ireland, before succeeding as the Chief Inspector of Factories in 1891.
