= Hector Hughes =

Scottish Labour Party politician

Hector Samuel James Hughes (14 August 1887 – 23 June 1970) was a Scottish Labour Party politician.

In his university years in University College, Dublin (UCD), he was a member of the Young Ireland Branch of the United Irish League, which successfully agitated for the land of 'ranchers' or large graziers to be confiscated and redistributed to their tenants.

In the Labour landslide at the 1945 general election, he was elected as Member of Parliament for Aberdeen North. He held the seat through six further general elections, before retiring from the House of Commons at the 1970 general election.

He died in Brighton aged 82, only a month after stepping down from the House of Commons and five days after the 1970 election returned the Conservative Party to power.

Hector was not only an esteemed politician. He fought for women's rights in the suffragette movement as well as the abolition of the death penalty. He was also a published poet and wrote the national anthem for Ghana when it gained independence.

He was the great-grandfather of Paul and Tonie Walsh among others.

Grandfather of Sylvia Walsh, Denise Casey, Mark Quinn, Clem Quinn and Benita Quinn Ahearne ( Ireland)

Father of Isolde Hughes/ Cazelet ( Actress) and Finny Hughes/McMullan

Parliament of the United Kingdom
Preceded by George Garro-Jones	Member of Parliament for Aberdeen North; 1945–1970	Succeeded by Robert Hughes
