= Frank Rose (politician) =

British politician

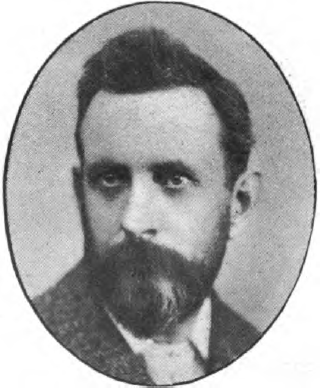
- Rose in about 1905

Member of Parliament for Aberdeen North
- In office 14 December 1918 – 10 July 1928
- Preceded by: Duncan Pirie
- Succeeded by: William Wedgwood Benn

Personal details
- Born: Frank Herbert Rose; 5 July 1857 Lambeth, London
- Died: 10 July 1928 (aged 71)
- Party: Labour
- Education: George Street British School

Frank Herbert Rose (5 July 1857 – 10 July 1928) was a British politician and journalist.

Born in Lambeth, Rose was educated at the George Street British School. He became an engineer, and worked in the trade until 1899, when he became a journalist. He was an early member of the Labour Party, and wrote The Coming Force, a history of the party.

At the 1906 UK general election, Rose stood unsuccessfully in Stockton, and then at the January 1910 UK general election he was unsuccessful in Crewe. He was finally elected in Aberdeen North at the 1918 UK general election, and held the seat until his death, in 1928. He was known for frequently defying the Labour whip, and so was sometimes considered to be an independent labour MP, despite his membership of the party.

Parliament of the United Kingdom
Preceded by Duncan Pirie	Member of Parliament for Aberdeen North; 1918–1928	Succeeded by William Wedgwood Benn
