= Factory inspector =

Regulatory official

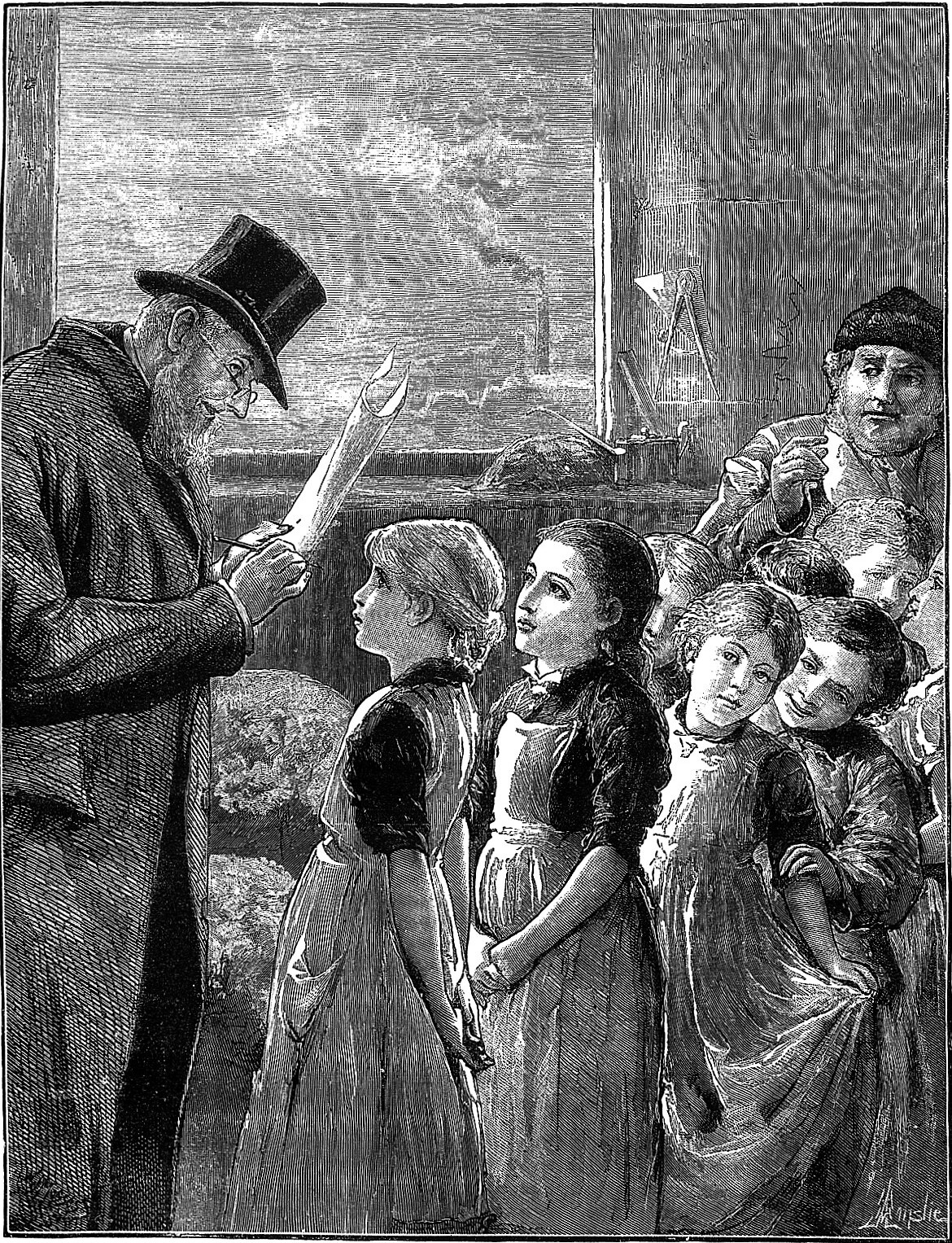
A government inspector visiting a factory employing children.

A factory inspector is someone who checks that factories comply with regulations affecting them.

== UK Factory Inspectorate ==
The enforcement of UK Factory Acts before that of 1833 had been left to local magistrates, which had meant that any compliance with those acts within the cotton industry to which they applied was effectively voluntary. The initial role of the Factory Inspectorate was to ensure compliance with the limits on age and working hours for children in the cotton industry, thus protecting them from overwork and injury. Four factory inspectors were appointed, with powers equivalent to a magistrate, the right to enter at will any cotton mill at work, and powers to introduce regulations (without parliamentary approval) to effectively implement the Factory Act. The inspectors were assisted by 'superintendents', who had none of their powers (the lack of a right of entry being a particular weakness). The Factory Act 1844 made the superintendents into 'sub-inspectors' with the right of entry at will. By the same Act, the inspectors lost their magisterial powers and the right to make regulations was transferred to the Home Secretary; a duty to guard machinery was laid on employers (but only where the machinery was in areas accessed by children or young people), the Factory Inspectorate therefore becoming concerned with the adequacy of machine guarding.

In 1893 Mary Paterson and May Tennant were the first two women to become factory inspectors earning £200 a year. Factory Inspectors had existed since 1833 but for the first sixty years they were all men.

== H.M. Chief Inspector of Factories. ==
A chronological list of Her (His) Majesty's Chief Inspector of Factories:

HM Chief Inspector of Factories
Chief Inspector	In post
Alexander Redgrave CB; b. 9 June 1818, d. 1894	1861–78 joint chief inspector with Robert Baker, chief inspector 1878–91
Robert Baker; b. 1803, d. 1880	1861–78 joint chief inspector with Alexander Redgrave
Frederick H. Whymper; b. 1828, d. 1893	1891–92
Richard Edward Sprague Oram; b. 1830, d. 8 March 1909	1892–96
Dr Arthur (Sir Arthur) Whitelegge; b. 17 October 1852, d. 25 April 1933	1896–1917
Sir Malcolm Robinson CB; b. 12 February 1857, d. 27 August 1933	1917–20
Robert Ernest Graves CBE; b. 22 December 1866, d. 21 May 1922	1920–22 died in office
Sir Gerald Bellhouse CBE; b. 1867, d. 15 September 1946	1922–32
Sir Duncan Randolph Wilson CBE; b. 1875, d. 1 March 1945	1932–39
Sir Wilfred Garrett; b. 1880, d. 1967	1939–46
Howard Everson Chasteney; b. 9 August 1888, d. 18 February 1947	1946–47 died in office
Sir George Percy Barnett; b. 19 October 1894, d. 19 October 1965	1947–57
Thomas Warburton McCullough CB, OBE; b. 13 March 1901, d. 28 December 1989	1957–63
Ronald Kington Christy CB; b. 18 August 1905, d. 29 August 1987	1963–67
William John Conway Plumbe; b. 17 March 1910, d. 9 November 1979	1967–71
Bryan Hugh Harvey CBE; b. 17 October 1914, d. 22 February 2004	1971–74
James (Jim) Dominic George Hammer CB; b. 21 April 1929	1975– 84
David Charles Thomas Eves CB; b. 10 January 1942	1985–88
A. J. (Tony) Lineham	1988–92
David Charles Thomas Eves CB; b. 10 January 1942	1992–2002

== See also ==
- Factory Acts
- Health and Morals of Apprentices Act 1802
