= James Reid Rust =

Scottish businessman and politician

James Reid Rust (1872–1945) was a businessman who served as both Lord Provost of Aberdeen and Lord Lieutenant of the City of Aberdeen.

== Life ==
He was born on 28 April 1872 the son of George Rust (1835-1891) and his wife Margaret Philip in 1881 he was living in the parish of the Kirk of St Nicholas in central Aberdeen.

In 1891 they were living 16 Craigie Street in Aberdeen.

He was apprenticed to Charles McDonald, granite merchant and owner of Froghall Granite Works at Gerrard Street and Rust later rose to be Director of that company. Around 1900 he set up his own granite company: "Rust & Alexander" also known as the "Caledonian Granite Works" at Holland Street in Aberdeen. He was then living at 9 Mount street in Aberdeen. Rust & alexander also dealt in sculpted granite, supplying to all of Scotland.

In 1921 his former firm of the Froghall Granite Works was amalgamated and absorbed into the Caledonian Granite Works, creating a virtual monopoly on granite in the area, especially for building purposes.

He was elected Lord Provost in 1929 and served until 1932 when he was succeeded by Sir Henry Alexander.

In 1933 he was elected Lord Lieutenant of Aberdeen.

He died at home, 17 Hamilton Place in Aberdeen, on 12 August 1945 and is buried in Springbank Cemetery, Aberdeen.

== Family ==
He was married to Grace Elizabeth Gorrod (1872-1963). They had two daughters and a son.

== Artistic recognition ==
He was portrayed by Herbert James Gunn.

Civic offices
Preceded by Sir Andrew Jopp Williams Lewis	Lord Provost of Aberdeen; 1929–1932	Succeeded by Sir Henry Alexander
