= Roy Brown Strathdee =

Scottish chemist

Roy Brown Strathdee DL TD FRIC FCS FRSE LLD (16 July 1897 – 17 June 1976), affectionately known as Strath, was a Scottish chemist and author, with a strong interest in Robert Louis Stevenson.

== Life ==
He was born in Aberdeen on 16 July 1897, the son of James Donald Strathdee, and his wife, Margaret (Maggie) Gilroy (sister of Rev Prof James Gilroy DD). The family lived at 164 Mid Stocket Road. His family emigrated to Montreal in Canada in 1908 but left Roy in the care of an aunt in Aberdeen. He was educated at Robert Gordon's College where he was the McLellan Prizeman.

He began studying Mathematics at Aberdeen University in 1914 but had to terminate when he was called up to serve in the First World War. Beginning as an NCO in the 4th battalion Gordon Highlanders serving in France. Returning to university in 1919 he graduated MA in 1920 then decided to do a second degree in Chemistry graduating BSc in 1923. He then did postgraduate studies at Cambridge University under Prof J. E. Humphries and W. H. Mills, gaining his first doctorate (PhD) in 1927.

He returned to Aberdeen as a Lecturer in Chemistry in 1927 also then taking over the role of training officers in the University OTC, as a branch of the Territorial Army. In the Second World War he took over officer training in the Aberdeen area and after the war was an Honorary Colonel 1957 to 1964.

In May 1959 he became Deputy Lieutenant of Aberdeen.

In 1954 he was elected a Fellow of the Royal Society of Edinburgh. His proposers were E. Maitland Wright, Richard Barrer, Jack Allen and Vero Wynne-Edwards.

Strathdee died suddenly on holiday in Guernsey on 17 June 1976, at the age of 78.

== Publications ==
- A New Type of Thiocyanine (1927) thesis
- Chemistry: From Retort to Grid
- The Playing Fields of Kings
- Fort Cumberland
- Scientia et Opera
- Stevenson as a Scientist
- RLS Nomad
