= Sir James Taggart =

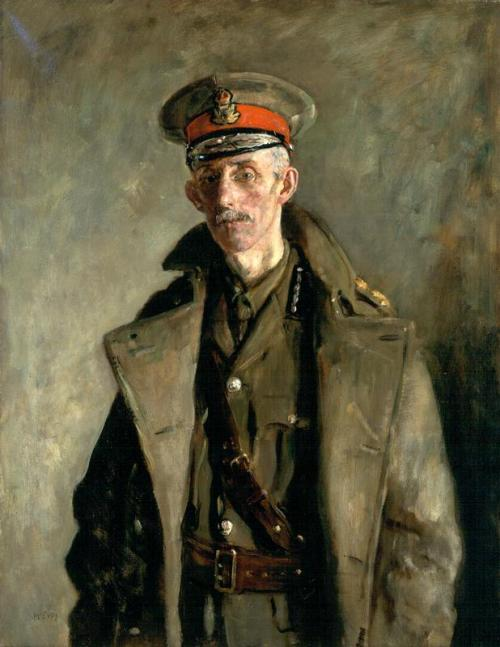
Sir James Taggart, KBE, Lord Provost of Aberdeen (1914-1919) by Ambrose McEvoy

Sir James Taggart KBE DL (1849–1929) was a Scottish businessman who served as Lord Provost of Aberdeen 1914 to 1919. Much loved throughout Aberdeenshire he was affectionately known as Good Sir James.

== Life ==
He was born at Coldwells Farm near Inverurie on 6 December 1849, the son of farmer Charles Taggart and his wife, Margaret Barnet. His father died when he was only seven years old.

By 1900 he was running a successful granite works in Aberdeen: The Great Western Granite Works at 80 Great Western Road and was living nearby at 382 Great Western Road.

In 1905 he was made Deputy Lieutenant of Aberdeen.

In 1914 he succeeded Adam Maitland as Lord Provost of Aberdeen. At 11am on 11 November 1918 Taggart stood on the balcony of the Aberdeen Town Hall to announce the Armistice to the cheering crowds below. He was succeeded in his role as Lord Provost by William Meff.

In 1921 he was invited to unveil the war memorial at Holburn Church in south Aberdeen.

He died in Aberdeen on 26 November 1929. Despite poor weather his funeral cortege on Friday 29 November was escorted by several thousand people, from his home at Ashley Lodge on Great Western Road to Springbank Cemetery in south Aberdeen. The tribute at the graveside was read by Sir George Adam Smith.

== Family ==
He was married to Eliza Reid (1855-1932). They had two sons: John Douglas Taggart (1895-1949) and Edwin Barnet Taggart (1891-1951), and one daughter, Alice Mary Taggart (1896-1955).

== Artistic recognition ==
He was portrayed in 1925 by Ambrose McEvoy in military uniform in 1917. The picture is held by Aberdeen Art Gallery and Museum.

== Publications ==
- Stories Told by Sir James Taggart (1929)

Civic offices
Preceded by Adam Maitland	Lord Provost of Aberdeen; 1914–1919	Succeeded by William Meff
