= Jim and Jean Strathdee =

American musicians (born 1941/1944)

Jim Strathdee
- Born: May 9, 1941 (age 84); Sacramento, California, US
- Occupations: singer-songwriter; worship leader; choral director
- Musical career
- Genres: Christian folk; hymn
- Instruments: vocals; guitar; harmonica; hand drum; piano
- Years active: 1963–present

Jean Strathdee
- Born: November 15, 1944 (age 81); Lincoln, California, US
- Occupations: singer-songwriter; worship leader; choral director
- Musical career
- Genres: Christian folk; hymn
- Instruments: vocals; mandolin; piano
- Years active: 1971–present

Portrait of Jim and Jean Strathdee

Jim (born May 9, 1941) and Jean Strathdee (born November 15, 1944), are American musicians and creators of Christian music for worship and evangelism. They work in the Methodist tradition of choral and congregational singing within the broad folk music genre. A large part of their career has been as traveling performers "in ministry to the church-at-large."

== Works ==
Their work has been published in at least Australia, Canada, Cuba, New Zealand, Nicaragua, and the United States from 1969 to 2022. One database lists 20 texts and 29 tunes composed by Jim Strathdee. Although only Jim's name is cited for much of their shared work, the creativity of two musicians in a long marriage cannot reasonably be assigned to only one. The United Church of Canada selected 10 Strathdee works for their comprehensive hymnal:

- Voices United (1996)

At least four Strathdee compositions have been published in five other hymnals and song books from diverse Christian traditions:

- New Wine (1969) (13 selections)
- Songs for a Gospel People (1986) (8 selections)
- Servir a Dios (1987) (12 selections)
- Chalice Hymnal (1995) (4 selections)
- The Faith We Sing (2000) (4 selections)

Plus at least one in eight or more others. (Note: Sources:) Denominational hymnals document their compilers' best current understanding of Christianity by selecting both familiar and recent hymns. More generally, hymns help create and maintain Christian behavior by individuals and communities.

What does the Lord require of you (1986) is included in 11 of the books, the greatest number. It is a simple round on Micah 6:8 ("What does the Lord require of you, but to love justice, act kindly, and walk humbly with your God?") that renews an ancient thread of religious wisdom.

I am the light of the world (1969) is in 7 books, adapted from a poem by Howard Thurman, The Work of Christmas. The hook is "If you follow and love you'll learn the mystery of what you were meant to do and be." The work remains a topic of seasonal commentary 45 years later.

In 1990 they became the Music Directors for Saint Mark's United Methodist Church in Sacramento, California, continuing there until 2006. They then worked again "in ministry to the church-at-large" and returned to St. Mark's in 2017 as Musicians in Residence. In 1995 during controversy over the hymnal revision process by the United Church of Canada, they gave concerts in nine cities and were interviewed at length in Edmonton, Alberta.
