= Springbank Cemetery, Aberdeen =

Burial ground, in Aberdeen, Scotland, UK

Springbank Cemetery
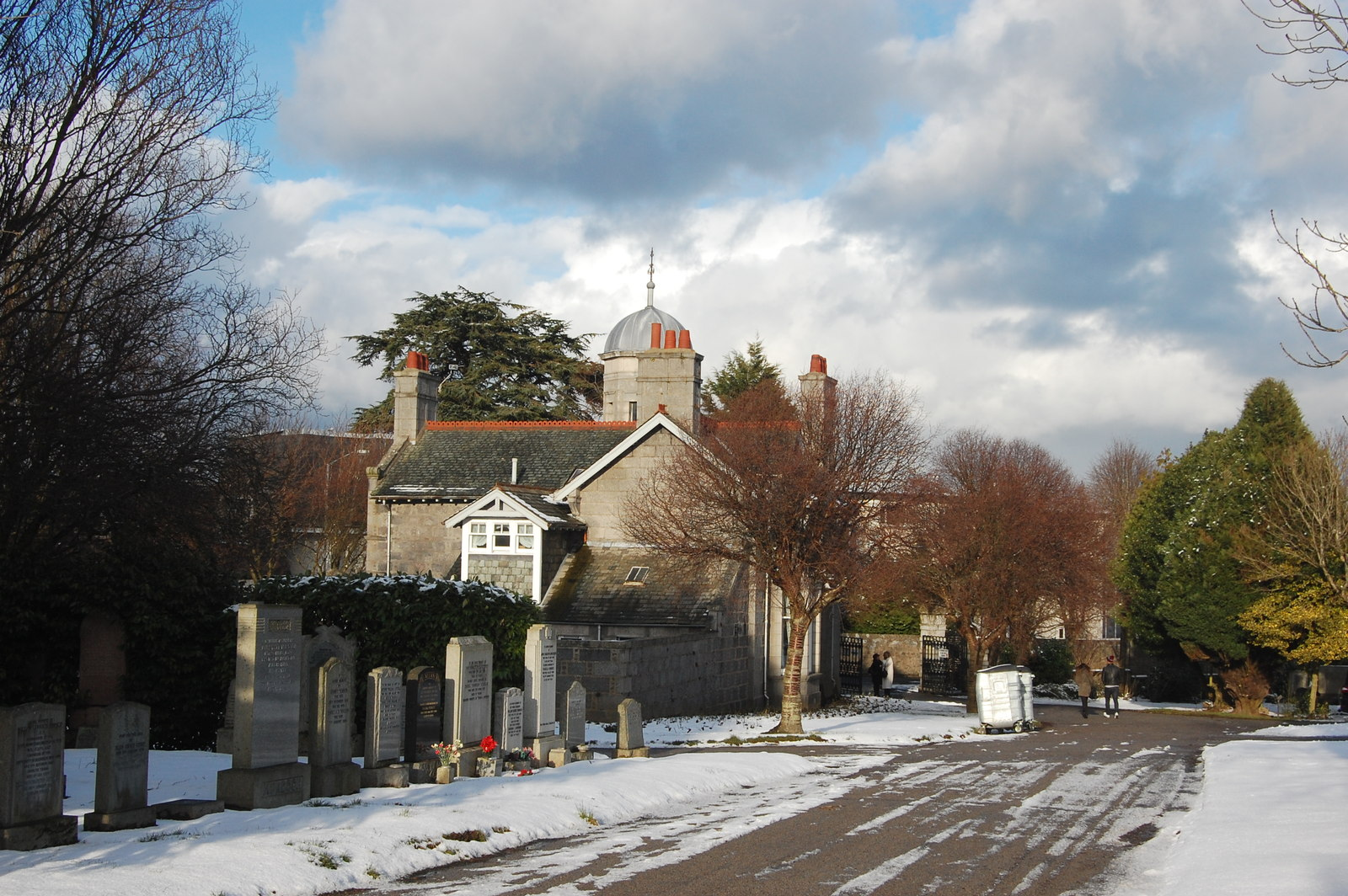
- Cemetery Lodge, Springbank Cemetery (2012)
- Interactive map of Springbank Cemetery

Details
- Established: 1884
- Location: Aberdeen
- Country: Scotland
- Coordinates: 57°07′55″N 2°08′47″W
- Owned by: Aberdeen City Council
- Size: 15 hectares (37 acres)
- No. of graves: 23,000+
- Find a Grave

Springbank Cemetery is located on Countesswells Road, Aberdeen. It opened in 1884.

Springbank Cemetery, Aberdeen

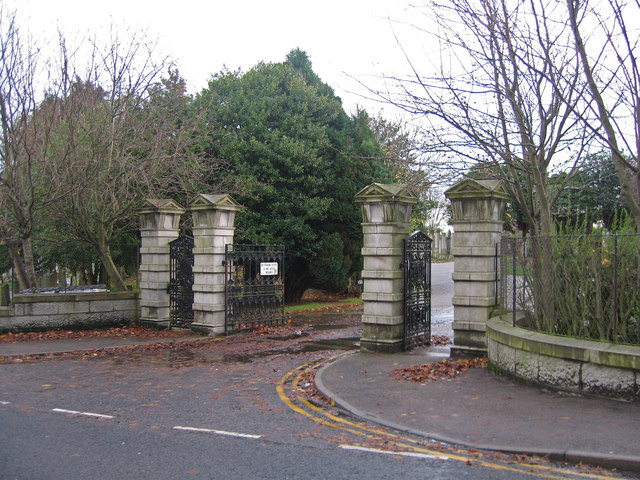
Countesswells Road entrance of Springbank Cemetery.

The cemetery is operated by the local authority, Aberdeen City Council, is one of seventeen cemeteries in Aberdeen. It is located on Countesswells Road with entrances on both Countesswells Road and Springfield Road where the cemetery lodge is situated.

According to Historic Environment Scotland, at the south-west corner of the cemetery there formerly stood Springbank Cottage.

== Notable graves ==
The cemetery contains 95 war graves, 36 from the First World War and 59 from the Second World War

- William Dove Paterson a pioneer of early cinema
- James Reid Rust Lord Provost of Aberdeen and Lord Lieutenant of Aberdeenshire
- Sir James Taggart, Lord Provost of Aberdeen 1914 to 1919
