= Aberdeen =

Third most populous city of Scotland

Aberdeen Obar Dheathain (Scottish Gaelic) Aiberdeen (Northern Scots)
- City, lieutenancy and council area
- City of Aberdeen
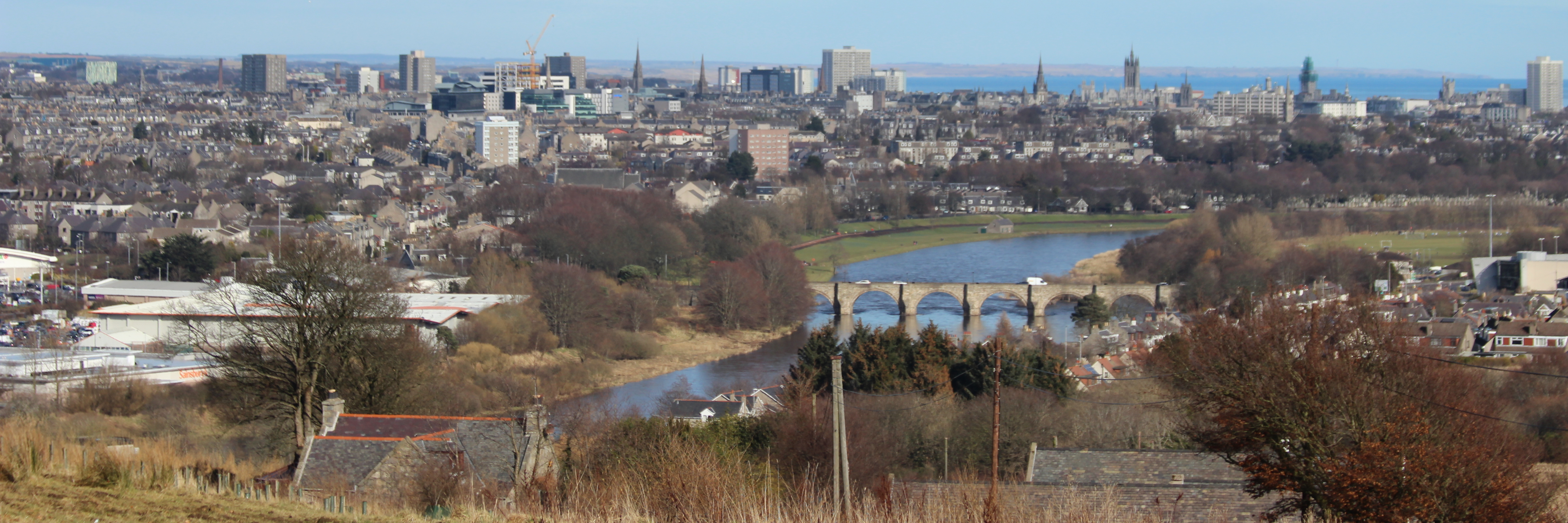
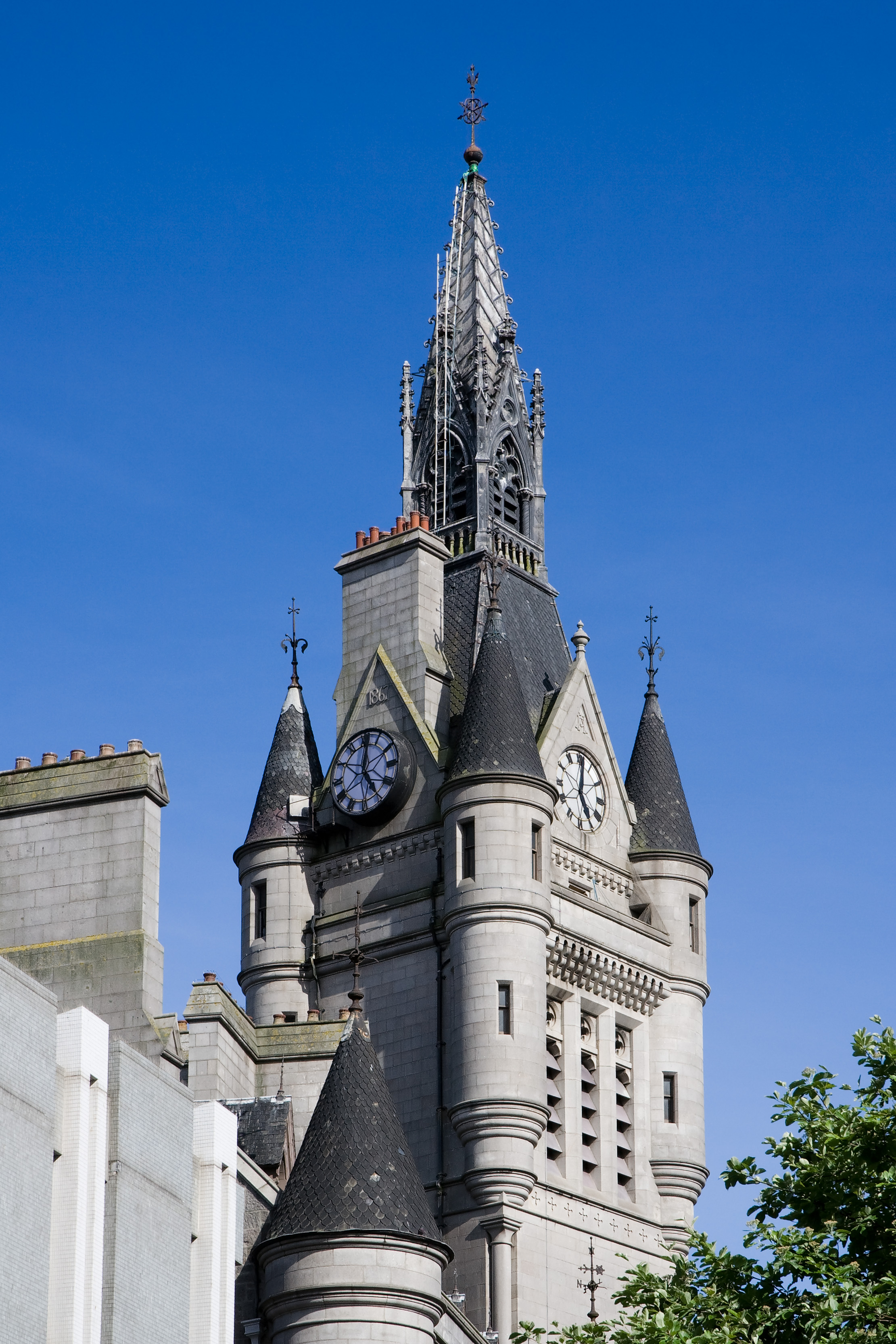
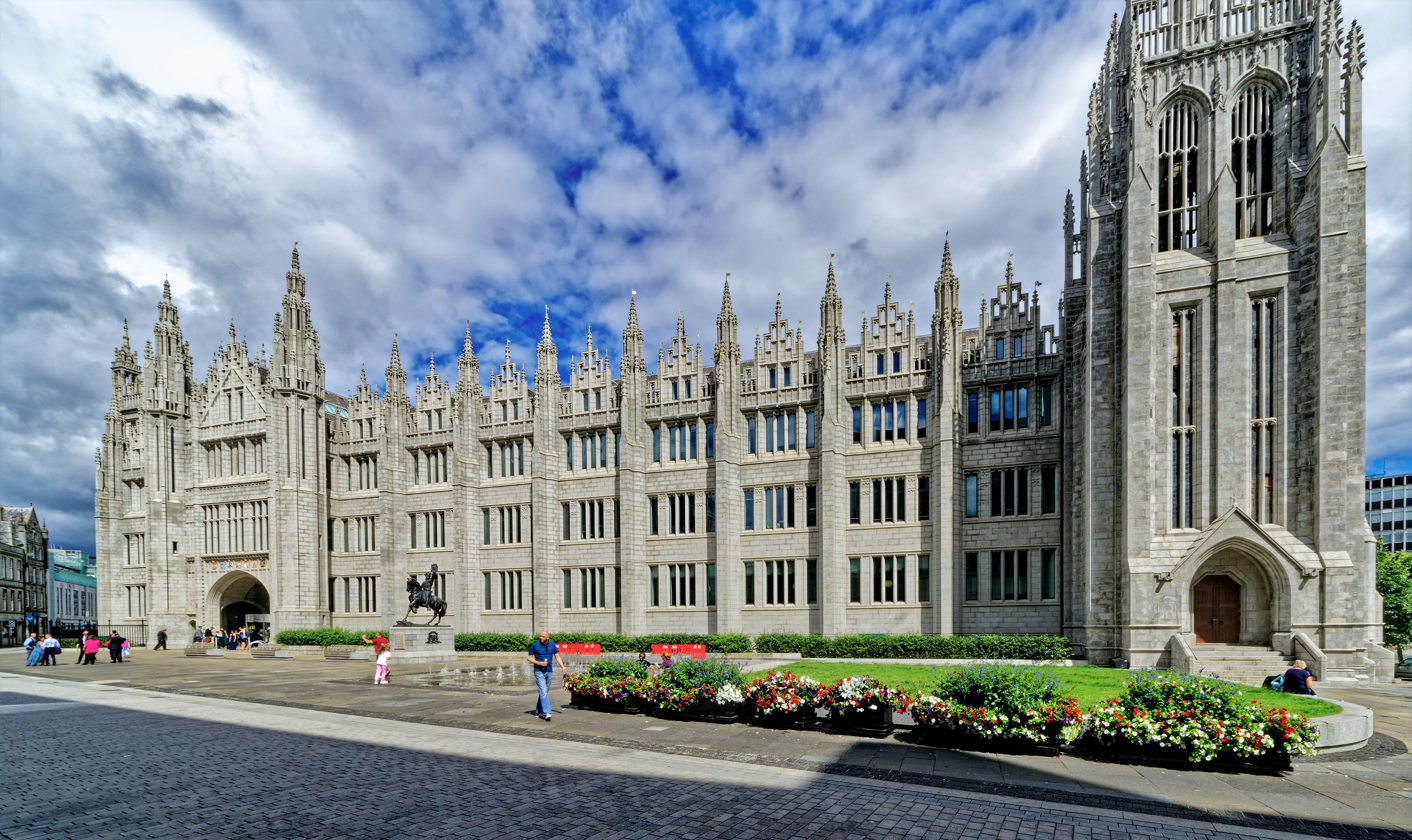
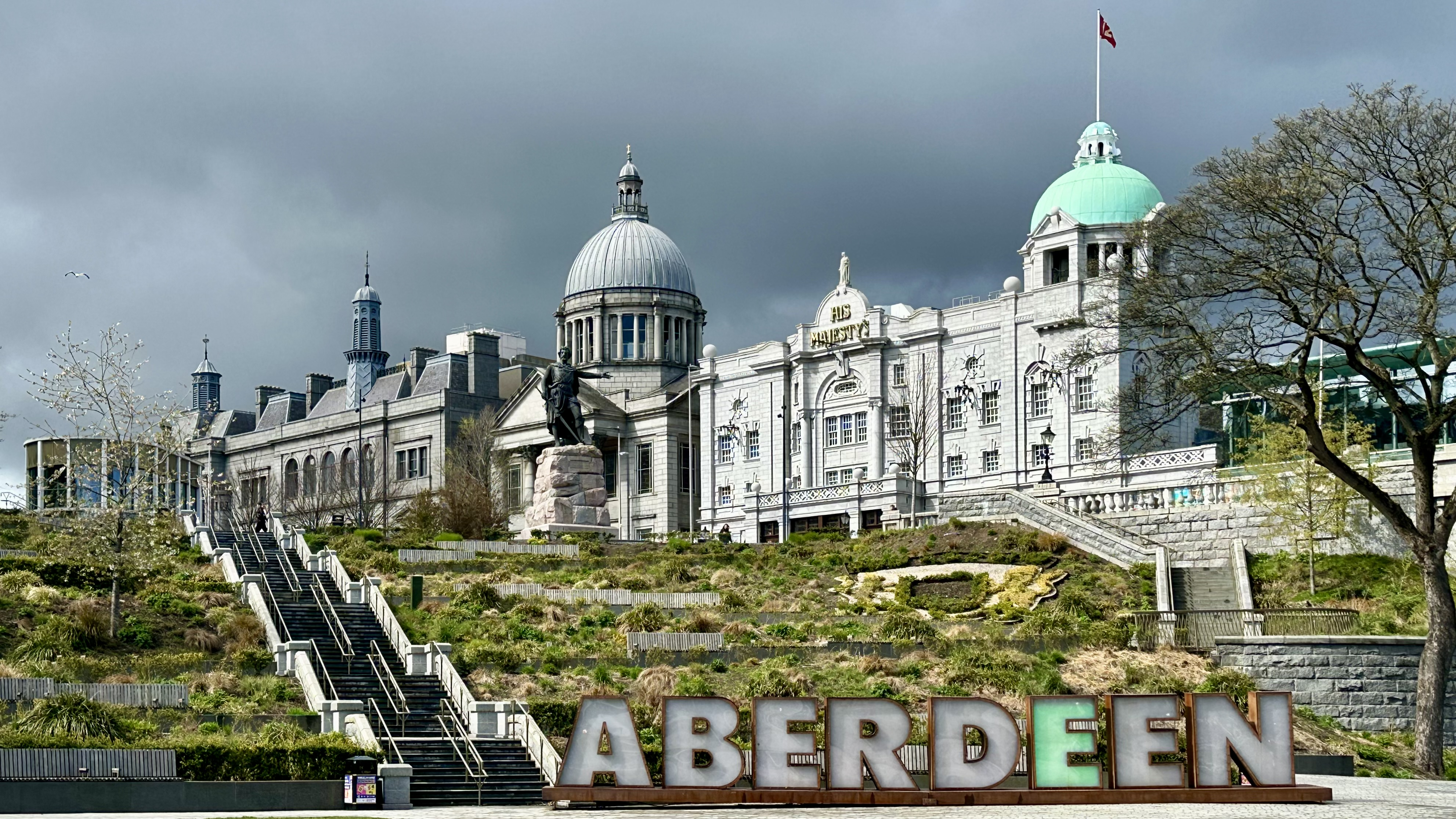
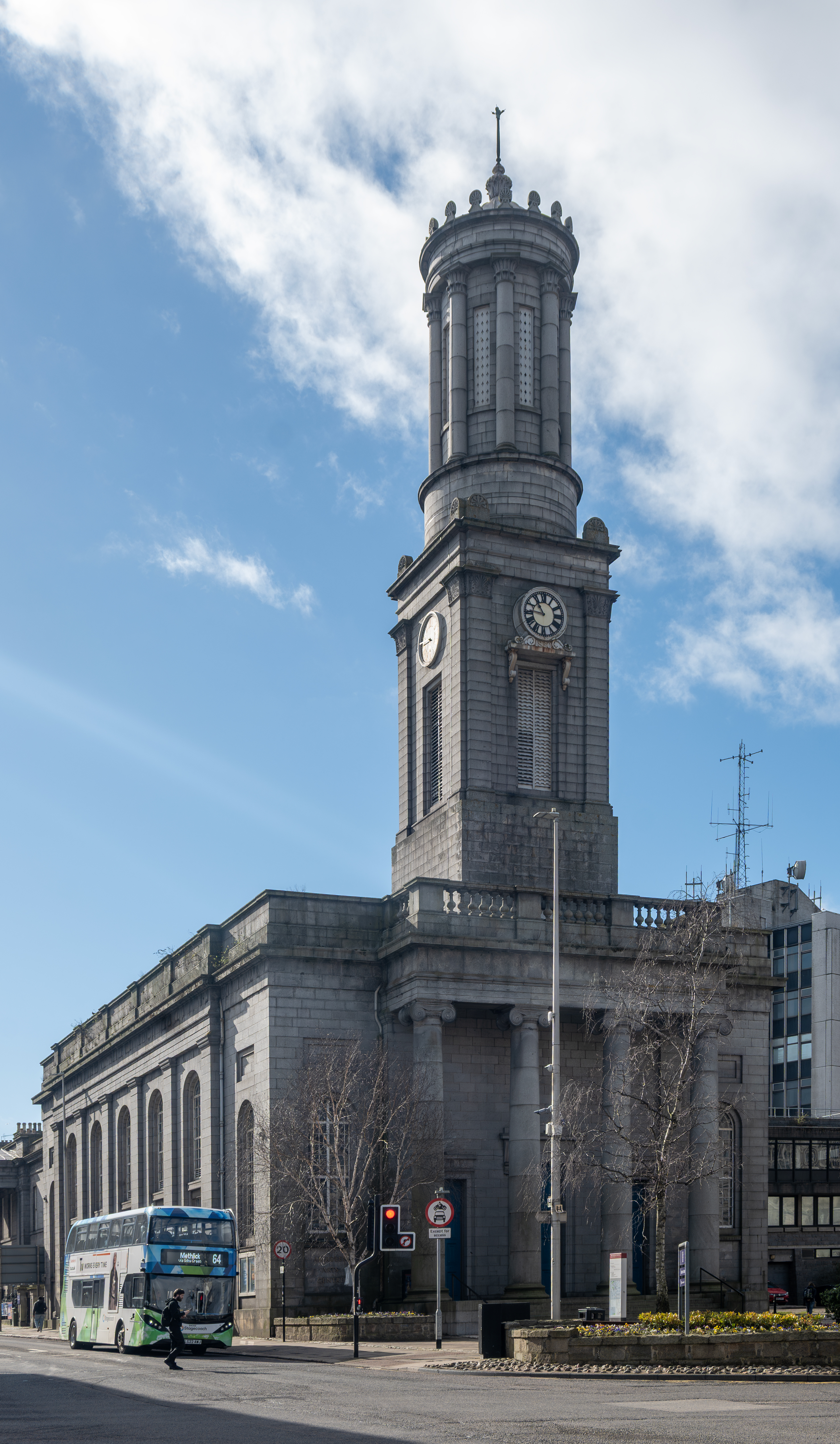
- Aberdeen from Tollohill Woods Aberdeen Town House Marischal College Union Terrace Gardens, His Majesty's Theatre Aberdeen Arts Centre

- Flag Coat of arms
- Nicknames: Granite City, the Silver City by Sea, Oil Capital of Europe
- Aberdeen shown within Scotland
- Coordinates: 57.15°N 2.11°W
- Sovereign state: United Kingdom
- Country: Scotland
- Council area: Aberdeen City
- Lieutenancy area: Aberdeen
- Historic County: Aberdeenshire
- Earliest Charter: 1179
- City status: 1891
- Unitary authority: 1 April 1996
- Administrative HQ: Town House

Government
  - Type: Council
  - Body: Aberdeen City Council
  - Control: No overall control
  - MPs: 2 MPs: Kirsty Blackman (SNP); Douglas Lumsden (CON)
  - MSPs: 3 MSPs: Jack Middleton (SNP); Jackie Dunbar (SNP); Stephen Flynn (SNP)

Area
  - Total: 72 sq mi (186 km^{2})
  - Rank: 25th

Population (2025)
  - Total: 230,180
  - Rank: 8th
  - Density: 3,200/sq mi (1,240/km^{2})
- Demonym: Aberdonian
- Time zone: UTC+0 (GMT)
  - Summer (DST): UTC+1 (BST)
- Postcode areas: AB10–13 (part), AB14–16, AB21–25
- Dialling codes: 01224
- ISO 3166 code: GB-ABE
- GSS code: S12000033
- Website: aberdeencity.gov.uk

Aberdeen (Note: /ˌæbərˈdiːn/ AB-ər-DEEN; Scots: [ˌeːbərˈdin] or [ˈeːbərdin]; Scottish Gaelic: Obar Dheathain [ˈopəɾ ˈʝɛ.ɪɲ]) is a port city in North East Scotland, and is the third most populous Scottish city. Historically, Aberdeen was within the historic county of Aberdeenshire, but is now separate from the council area of Aberdeenshire. Aberdeen City Council is one of Scotland's 32 local authorities (commonly referred to as councils). Aberdeen has a population of 198,590 (2020) for the main urban area and 220,690 (2020) for the wider settlement including outlying localities, making it the United Kingdom's 39th most populous built-up area. Aberdeen has a long, sandy coastline and features an oceanic climate, with cool summers and mild, rainy winters.

Aberdeen received royal burgh status from David I of Scotland (1124–1153), which transformed the city economically. The traditional industries of fishing, paper-making, shipbuilding, and textiles have been overtaken by the oil industry and Aberdeen's seaport. Aberdeen Heliport is one of the busiest commercial heliports in the world, and the seaport is the largest in the north-east part of Scotland. A university town, the city is known for the University of Aberdeen, founded in 1495 as King's College, the fifth oldest university in the English-speaking world and located in Old Aberdeen.

During the mid-18th to mid-20th centuries, Aberdeen's buildings incorporated locally quarried grey granite, which may sparkle like silver because of its high mica content. Since the discovery of North Sea oil in 1969, Aberdeen has been known as the offshore oil capital of Europe. Based upon the discovery of prehistoric villages around the mouths of the rivers Dee and Don, the area around Aberdeen is thought to have been settled for at least 6,000 years.

== Toponymy ==
The name given to Aberdeen translates as 'mouth of the river Don', and is recorded as Aberdon in 1172 and Aberden in c. 1180. The first element of the name is the Pictish word aber 'river mouth'. The second element is from the Celtic river goddess Devona.

Aberdeen is usually described as within the historical Pictish territory and became Gaelic-speaking at some time in the medieval period. Old Aberdeen is the approximate location of Aberdon, the first settlement of Aberdeen; this literally means "the mouth of the Don". The Celtic word aber means "river mouth", as in modern Welsh (Aberystwyth, Aberdare, Aberbeeg etc.). The Scottish Gaelic name is Obar Dheathain (variation: Obairreadhain; *obar presumably being a loan from the earlier Pictish; the Gaelic term is inbhir), and in Latin, the Romans referred to the river as Devana. Medieval (or Ecclesiastical) Latin has it as Aberdonia.

The local Doric pronunciation, [ˌeːbərˈdin] or [ˈeːbərdin] (with a long ay sound), is frequently rendered Aiberdeen or Aiberdein.

== History ==
=== Early origins ===
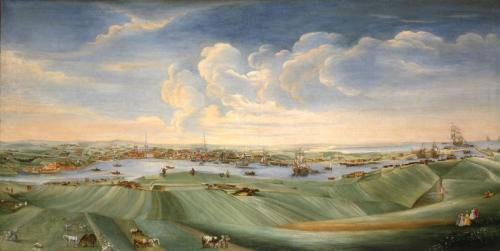
View of Aberdeen by William Mosman, 1756

The Aberdeen area has seen human settlement for at least 8,000 years. The city began as two separate burghs: Old Aberdeen at the mouth of the river Don; and New Aberdeen, a fishing and trading settlement, where the Denburn waterway entered the river Dee estuary. The earliest charter was granted by William the Lion in 1179 and confirmed the corporate rights granted by David I.

In 1214, Aberdeen Burgesses were granted a Royal Charter by Alexander II of Scotland giving them the sole right to form a Guild. This body exercised power in the composition of the local council, and the affairs of the town. The Burgesses of the Guild were an integral part of the council for more than 700 years and played a considerable role in the growth and development of Aberdeen. In 1319, the Great Charter of Robert the Bruce transformed Aberdeen into a property-owning and financially independent community. Granted with it was the nearby Forest of Stocket, whose income formed the basis for the city's Common Good Fund which still benefits Aberdonians.

=== Middle Ages and Renaissance ===
During the Wars of Scottish Independence, Aberdeen was under English rule, so Robert the Bruce laid siege to Aberdeen Castle before destroying it in 1308, followed by executing the English garrison. The city was burned by Edward III of England in 1336, but was rebuilt and extended. The city was strongly fortified to prevent attacks by neighbouring lords, but the gates were removed by 1770.

Aberdeen's medieval council registers survive from 1398 onwards and are exceptional for their quantity and continuity among surviving Scottish burgh records. The earliest eight volumes, from 1398 to 1511, have been included in the UNESCO UK Memory of the World Register, and have been edited in a digital edition.

Robert Davidson, a wealthy merchant and pirate, served as Provost of Aberdeen from 1405 to 1408 and again from 1410. He led the three dozen burgesses who joined the army assembled by Alexander Stewart, Earl of Mar to oppose the forces of Donald of Islay, Lord of the Isles, and was killed at the Battle of Harlaw on 24 July 1411.

In the 15th and 16th centuries the burgh council and craft guilds organised large processions and pageants during the religious festivals of Corpus Christi and Candlemas. The visit of Margaret Tudor, Queen of Scots, to the city in 1511 was commemorated in 'Blyth Aberdeane' by the court poet William Dunbar.

=== Wars of the Three Kingdoms ===
During the Wars of the Three Kingdoms of 1644 to 1647 the city was plundered by both sides. In 1644, it was taken and ransacked by Royalist troops after the Battle of Aberdeen and two years later it was stormed by a Royalist force under the command of the George Gordon, 2nd Marquess of Huntly. An outbreak of bubonic plague over 1647–1648 killed 8.5% of the population, adding to the economic and demographic damage caused by war. In the 18th century, a new Town Hall was built and the first social services appeared with the Aberdeen Infirmary at Woolmanhill in 1739 and the Aberdeen Lunatic Asylum in 1800.

=== Post-Napoleonic depression ===
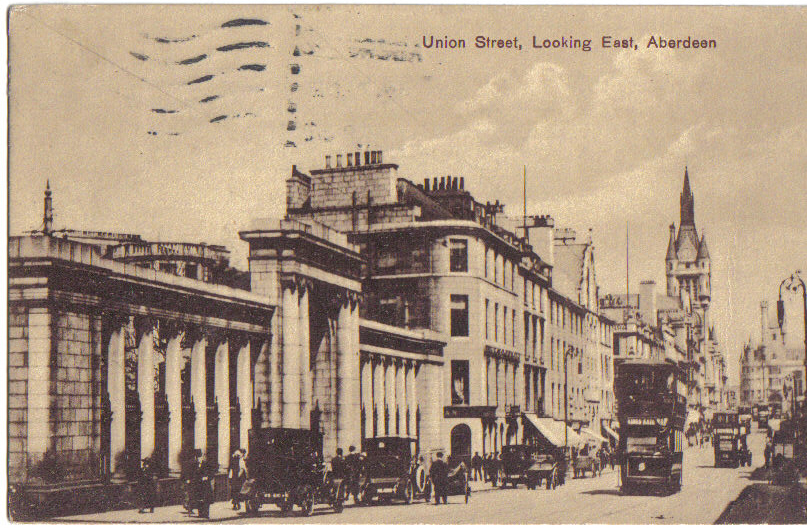
Union Street, c. 1928

The expensive infrastructure works led to the city becoming bankrupt in 1817 during the Post-Napoleonic depression, an economic downturn immediately after the Napoleonic Wars; but the city's prosperity later recovered. The increasing economic importance of Aberdeen and the development of the shipbuilding and fishing industries led to the construction of the present harbour including Victoria Dock and the South Breakwater, and the extension of the North Pier.

Gas street lighting arrived in 1824 and an enhanced water supply appeared in 1830 when water was pumped from the Dee to a reservoir in Union Place. An underground sewer system replaced open sewers in 1865. The city absorbed the neighbouring burghs of Old Aberdeen and Woodside plus the Torry area on the south bank of the Dee in 1891.

=== Second World War ===
Over the course of World War II Aberdeen was attacked 32 times by the German Luftwaffe. One of the most devastating attacks was on Wednesday 21 April 1943 when 29 Luftwaffe Dornier 217s flying from Stavanger, Norway attacked the city between the hours of 22:17 and 23:04. A total of 98 civilians and 27 servicemen were killed, along with 12,000 houses damaged, after a mixture of 127 Incendiary, High Explosive and Cluster bombs were dropped on the city in one night.

Two books written in 2018 and 2022 using bombing records held in London identified that unexploded bombs from the 1943 raid were found in the 1950s and 1980s making the bombs dropped 129 in total. Damage from the raid can still be seen in some parts of Aberdeen.

=== Coat of arms and motto ===
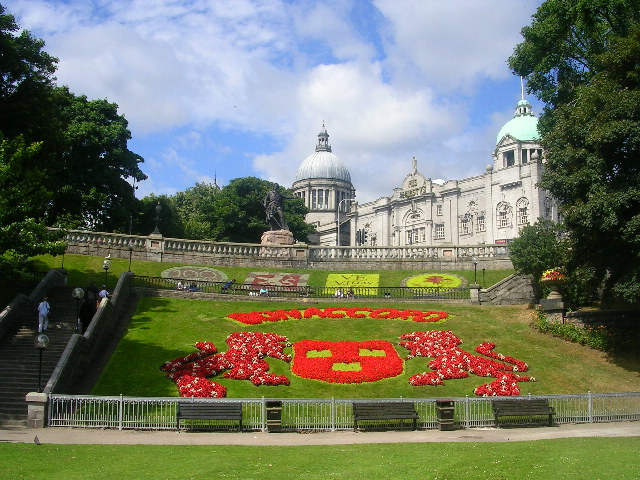
Coat of Arms display in Union Terrace Gardens

The arms and banner of the city show three silver towers on red. This motif dates from at least the time of Robert the Bruce and represents the buildings that stood on the three hills of medieval Aberdeen: Aberdeen Castle on Castle Hill (today's Castlegate); the city gate on Port Hill; and a church on St Catherine's Hill (now levelled).

"Bon Accord" is the motto of the city and is French for "Good Agreement". Legend tells that its use dates from a password used by Robert the Bruce during the 14th century Wars of Scottish Independence, when he and his men laid siege to the English-held Aberdeen Castle before destroying it in 1308. It is still widely present in the city, throughout street names, business names and the city's Bon Accord shopping mall.

The shield in the coat of arms is supported by two leopards. A local magazine is called the "Leopard" and, when Union Bridge was widened in the 20th century, small statues of the creature in a sitting position were cast and placed on top of the railing posts (known locally as Kelly's Cats). The city's toast is "Happy to meet, sorry to part, happy to meet again".

=== Recent history ===
In 2012, HSBC named Aberdeen as a leading business hub and one of eight 'super cities' spearheading the UK's economy, marking it as the only city in Scotland so designated. In 2018, Aberdeen was found to be the best city in the UK to start a business in a study released by card payment firm Paymentsense.

Since the early 2020s, Aberdeen has been the focus of several regeneration initiatives, particularly in the city centre and along its waterfront. These projects have included improvements to public spaces and main thoroughfares, the redevelopment of important sites, and urban revitalisation efforts. Examples include the new Aberdeen Market named Flint, the conversion of Union Street between Bridge Street and Market Street into a bus-and-cycle street with widened pavements, and the transformation of Queens Links.

== Politics and government ==
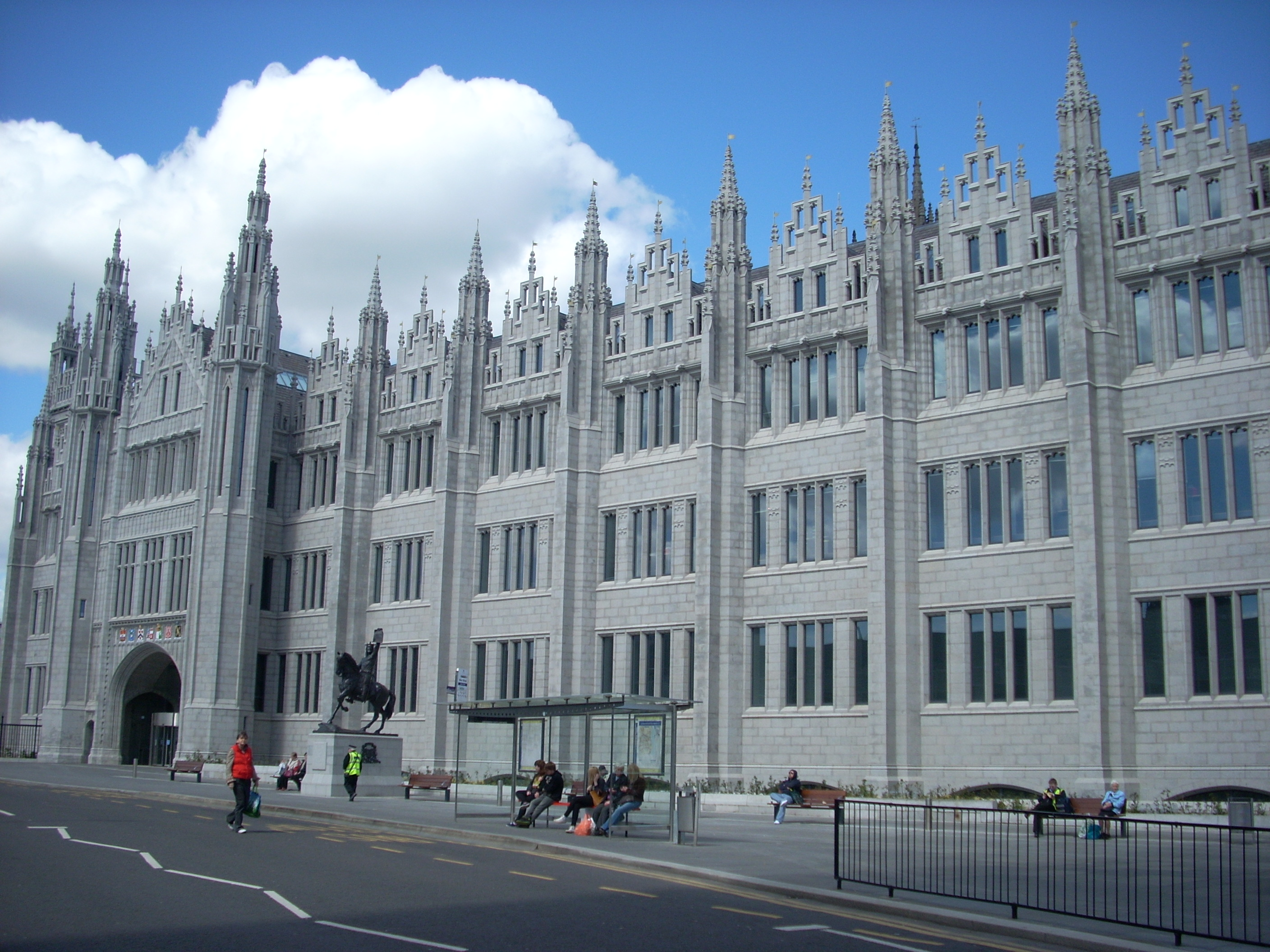
Marischal College, main offices of Aberdeen City Council

Aberdeen City is one of 32 council areas of Scotland, administered by Aberdeen City Council. The council meets at Aberdeen Town House and has its main offices in the adjoining Marischal College. The civic head and chair of the council is the Lord Provost. The council area is also divided into 30 community council areas, 29 of which had community councils operating as at August 2024.

The first burgh of Aberdeen, covering just the New Aberdeen area near the mouth of the Dee, was created by David I (reigned 1124–1153). Neighbouring Old Aberdeen to the north was subsequently made a separate burgh in 1489. The burgh of Aberdeen was governed by a corporation, also known as the town council. As Aberdeen grew, the council's powers were inadequate to cater for the needs of the growing urban area. A separate police commission was established in 1795 with powers to levy taxes and provide infrastructure ('police' in this context being its older meaning of civic government rather than law enforcement). The first police commission was short-lived, but it was resurrected in 1818 after the town council went bankrupt in 1817. From 1818 until 1871 there was a dual system of local government, with the town council and police commission having different roles in Aberdeen's administration. The police commission was eventually abolished in 1871 and its functions absorbed by the town council.

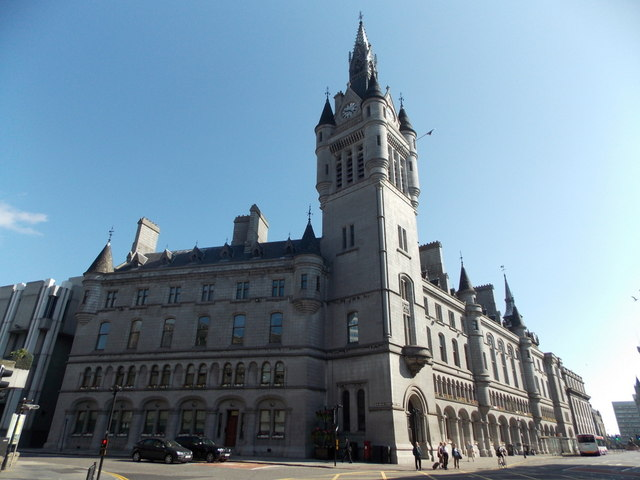
Aberdeen Town House, the administrative HQ of Aberdeen City Council

In 1891 the city boundaries were significantly enlarged, absorbing the neighbouring burghs of Old Aberdeen and Woodside, plus the Torry area on the south bank of the Dee. The act of parliament which expanded the burgh also confirmed that Aberdeen was entitled to be called a city; it had commonly been described as a city prior to that, but (like most Scottish cities) without official recognition. Following the absorption of Torry in 1891, the city boundaries straddled the counties of Aberdeenshire and Kincardineshire. Aberdeen was made a county of itself in 1899. In 1975 the burgh was replaced by the larger City of Aberdeen district within the Grampian region. Further local government reforms in 1996 replaced the districts and regions created in 1975 with council areas; the pre-1996 City of Aberdeen district became the Aberdeen City council area.

In the Scottish Parliament, the city is represented by three constituencies with different boundaries: Aberdeen Central and Aberdeen Donside are wholly within the Aberdeen City council area. Aberdeen Deeside and North Kincardine includes the North Kincardine ward of Aberdeenshire Council. A further seven MSPs are elected as part of the North East Scotland electoral region. In the European Parliament the city was represented by six MEPs as part of the all-inclusive Scotland constituency. Aberdeen is represented in the Parliament of the United Kingdom by two constituencies, Aberdeen North and Aberdeen South, which are wholly within the Aberdeen City council area.

== Geography ==
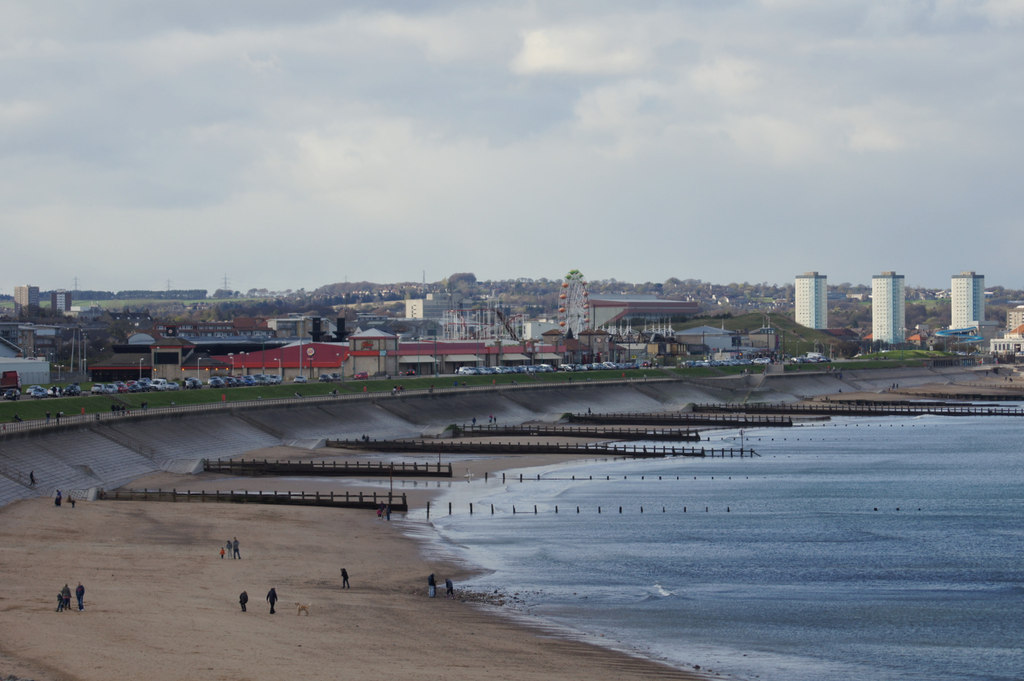
Aberdeen beach, situated along the coastline of Aberdeen on the North Sea

=== Location and area ===
Being situated between two river mouths, the city has little natural exposure of bedrock. The small amount of geophysics done, and occasional building-related exposures, combined with small exposures in the banks of the River Don, suggest that it is actually sited on an inlier of Devonian "Old Red" sandstones and silts. The outskirts of the city spread beyond the (inferred) limits of the outlier onto the surrounding metamorphic/ igneous complexes formed during the Dalradian period (approximately 480–600 million years ago) with sporadic areas of igneous Diorite granites to be found, such as that at the Rubislaw quarry which was used to build much of the Victorian parts of the city.

The city extends to 186 km^{2} (72 sq mi), and includes the former burghs of Old Aberdeen, New Aberdeen, Woodside and the Torry area to the south of River Dee. In 2025, this gave the city a population density of 1,240 inhabitants per square kilometre (3,200/sq mi). The city is built on many hills, with the original beginnings of the city growing from Castle Hill, St. Catherine's Hill and Windmill Hill. When compared to mainland Europe, Aberdeen is further north than almost all of Denmark and plenty of southern Sweden, being just south of Gothenburg in terms of latitude.

=== Climate ===
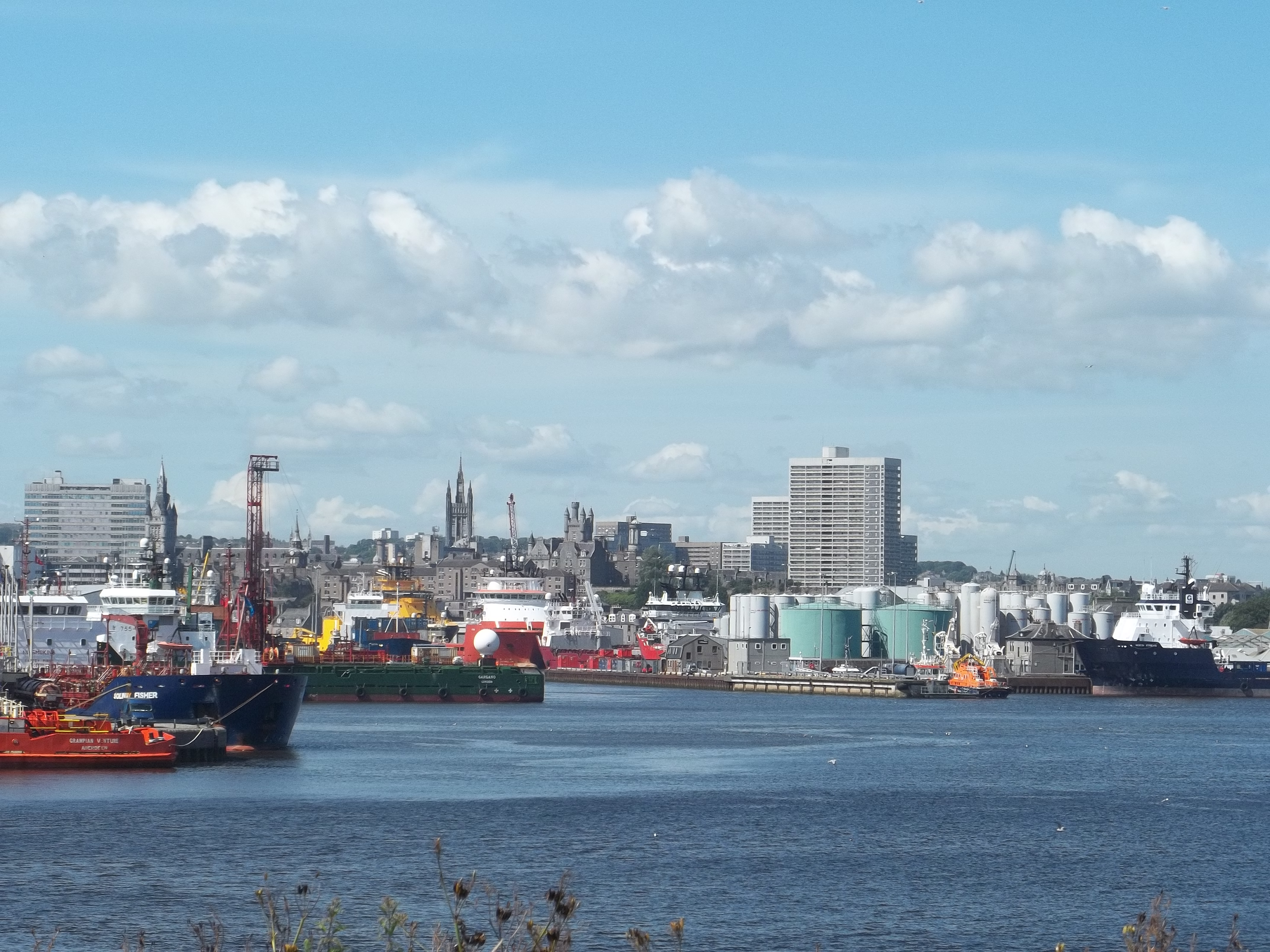
Sunshine across Aberdeen during August

Aberdeen features an oceanic climate (Köppen Cfb), with far milder winter temperatures than one might expect for its northern location. However, statistically speaking, it is still the coldest city in the UK. During the winter, especially throughout December, the length of the day is very short, averaging 6 hours and 41 minutes between sunrise and sunset at the winter solstice. As winter progresses, the length of the day grows fairly quickly, to 8 hours and 20 minutes by the end of January. Around summer solstice, the days will be around 18 hours long, having 17 hours and 55 minutes between sunrise and sunset. During this time of the year marginal nautical twilight lasts the entire night. Temperatures at this time of year hover around 17.0 °C (62.6 °F) during the day in most of the urban area, though nearer 16.0 °C (60.8 °F) directly on the coast, and around 18.0 to 19.0 °C (64.4 to 66.2 °F) in the westernmost suburbs.

Two weather stations collect climate data for the area, Aberdeen/Dyce Airport, and Craibstone. Both are about 4 1/2 miles (7 km) to the northwest of the city centre, and given that they are in close proximity to each other, exhibit very similar climatic regimes. Dyce tends to have marginally warmer daytime temperatures year-round owing to its slightly lower elevation, though it is more susceptible to harsh frosts. The coldest temperature to occur in recent years was −16.8 °C (1.8 °F) during December 2010, while the following winter, Dyce set a new February high-temperature station record on 28 February 2012 of 17.2 °C (63.0 °F), and a new March high temperature record of 21.6 °C (70.9 °F) on 25 March 2012.

The average temperature of the sea ranges from 6.6 °C (43.9 °F) in March to 13.8 °C (56.8 °F) in August.

Climate data for Dyce-Aberdeen (ABZ), (Note: Weather station is located 6 miles (10 km) from the Aberdeen city centre.) elevation: 65 m (213 ft), 1991–2020 normals, extremes 1960–present
Month	Jan	Feb	Mar	Apr	May	Jun	Jul	Aug	Sep	Oct	Nov	Dec	Year
Record high °C (°F)	17.2 (63.0)	17.2 (63.0)	21.6 (70.9)	23.7 (74.7)	24.4 (75.9)	26.7 (80.1)	29.8 (85.6)	29.7 (85.5)	27.0 (80.6)	22.1 (71.8)	18.8 (65.8)	15.1 (59.2)	29.8 (85.6)
Mean maximum °C (°F)	12.2 (54.0)	12.9 (55.2)	15.4 (59.7)	17.6 (63.7)	20.4 (68.7)	22.9 (73.2)	24.4 (75.9)	23.4 (74.1)	22.1 (71.8)	17.7 (63.9)	14.8 (58.6)	12.5 (54.5)	25.6 (78.1)
Mean daily maximum °C (°F)	6.8 (44.2)	7.3 (45.1)	9.1 (48.4)	11.2 (52.2)	13.9 (57.0)	16.3 (61.3)	18.5 (65.3)	18.3 (64.9)	16.1 (61.0)	12.6 (54.7)	9.2 (48.6)	6.9 (44.4)	12.2 (53.9)
Daily mean °C (°F)	3.9 (39.0)	4.2 (39.6)	5.6 (42.1)	7.6 (45.7)	10.0 (50.0)	12.7 (54.9)	14.8 (58.6)	14.6 (58.3)	12.6 (54.7)	9.5 (49.1)	6.2 (43.2)	3.9 (39.0)	8.8 (47.9)
Mean daily minimum °C (°F)	1.0 (33.8)	1.1 (34.0)	2.1 (35.8)	3.9 (39.0)	6.0 (42.8)	9.0 (48.2)	11.0 (51.8)	10.8 (51.4)	9.1 (48.4)	6.3 (43.3)	3.1 (37.6)	0.9 (33.6)	5.4 (41.6)
Mean minimum °C (°F)	−5.4 (22.3)	−5.1 (22.8)	−4.2 (24.4)	−1.8 (28.8)	−0.2 (31.6)	3.6 (38.5)	6.0 (42.8)	4.8 (40.6)	2.6 (36.7)	0.2 (32.4)	−3.4 (25.9)	−6.6 (20.1)	−8.3 (17.1)
Record low °C (°F)	−19.3 (−2.7)	−18.2 (−0.8)	−15.8 (3.6)	−6.8 (19.8)	−4.2 (24.4)	−0.3 (31.5)	0.1 (32.2)	−0.2 (31.6)	−2.4 (27.7)	−4.4 (24.1)	−15.6 (3.9)	−18.1 (−0.6)	−19.3 (−2.7)
Average precipitation mm (inches)	67.8 (2.67)	59.4 (2.34)	54.4 (2.14)	57.6 (2.27)	54.0 (2.13)	68.9 (2.71)	70.8 (2.79)	68.3 (2.69)	60.7 (2.39)	99.9 (3.93)	93.0 (3.66)	77.7 (3.06)	832.5 (32.78)
Average precipitation days (≥ 1.0 mm)	12.5	11.1	11.0	11.2	10.3	11.6	12.2	10.8	10.4	14.5	14.5	12.8	142.9
Average snowy days	8	7	6	4	0	0	0	0	0	0	3	6	34
Average relative humidity (%)	83	81	79	78	78	78	78	80	81	83	83	83	80
Mean monthly sunshine hours	60.5	85.4	125.5	153.9	202.7	163.5	162.4	156.7	125.1	95.0	68.1	48.5	1,447.3
Percentage possible sunshine	26	30	33	36	38	33	34	35	32	29	26	22	31
Source 1: Met Office NOAA (Relative humidity and snow days 1961–1990) Infoclimat (mean max/min)
Source 2: KNMI

Climate data for Aberdeen (Craibstone), (Note: Weather station is located 5 miles (8 km) from the Aberdeen city centre.) elevation: 102 m (335 ft), 1981–2010 normals, extremes 1958–present
Month	Jan	Feb	Mar	Apr	May	Jun	Jul	Aug	Sep	Oct	Nov	Dec	Year
Record high °C (°F)	16.0 (60.8)	16.3 (61.3)	21.2 (70.2)	23.4 (74.1)	23.8 (74.8)	26.8 (80.2)	28.8 (83.8)	28.6 (83.5)	25.9 (78.6)	21.1 (70.0)	18.3 (64.9)	15.4 (59.7)	28.8 (83.8)
Mean daily maximum °C (°F)	6.1 (43.0)	6.4 (43.5)	8.4 (47.1)	10.5 (50.9)	13.2 (55.8)	15.6 (60.1)	18.0 (64.4)	17.8 (64.0)	15.4 (59.7)	12.0 (53.6)	8.6 (47.5)	6.2 (43.2)	11.5 (52.7)
Daily mean °C (°F)	3.4 (38.1)	3.5 (38.3)	5.0 (41.0)	6.8 (44.2)	9.2 (48.6)	11.9 (53.4)	14.2 (57.6)	14.0 (57.2)	11.9 (53.4)	8.9 (48.0)	5.8 (42.4)	3.5 (38.3)	8.1 (46.6)
Mean daily minimum °C (°F)	0.6 (33.1)	0.6 (33.1)	1.6 (34.9)	3.0 (37.4)	5.2 (41.4)	8.1 (46.6)	10.3 (50.5)	10.1 (50.2)	8.4 (47.1)	5.7 (42.3)	2.9 (37.2)	0.8 (33.4)	4.8 (40.6)
Record low °C (°F)	−13.5 (7.7)	−12.2 (10.0)	−11.7 (10.9)	−6.7 (19.9)	−3.0 (26.6)	0.3 (32.5)	1.7 (35.1)	2.5 (36.5)	−0.5 (31.1)	−4.0 (24.8)	−10.8 (12.6)	−12.6 (9.3)	−13.5 (7.7)
Average precipitation mm (inches)	71.2 (2.80)	59.3 (2.33)	63.8 (2.51)	62.2 (2.45)	59.6 (2.35)	65.6 (2.58)	65.7 (2.59)	66.1 (2.60)	71.9 (2.83)	102.9 (4.05)	98.1 (3.86)	79.8 (3.14)	866.2 (34.10)
Average precipitation days (≥ 1.0 mm)	12.6	10.6	11.5	10.5	10.4	10.5	11.3	11.2	10.1	13.6	13.7	12.3	138.3
Mean monthly sunshine hours	60.6	84.9	120.3	151.5	194.1	163.8	159.3	160.4	124.6	100.0	65.4	47.7	1,432.6
Source 1: Met Office
Source 2: KNMI

== Demography ==
Population pyramid of Aberdeen (local council area) in 2020

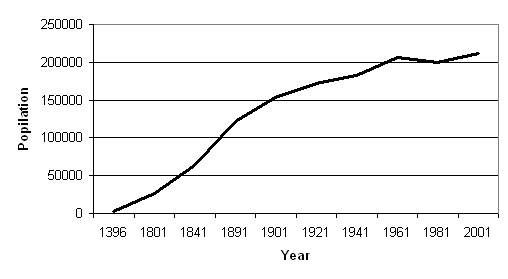
Aberdeen's population since 1396

The Aberdeen locality population estimate is 198,590 (2020). For the wider settlement of Aberdeen including Cove Bay and Dyce, the population estimate is 220,690 (2020). For Aberdeen City council area, the population estimate is 230,180 (2025).

In 1396, the population was about 3,000. By 1801, it had become 26,992, then 153,503 in 1901, and finally 182,467 in 1941.

The 2011 census showed fewer young people in Aberdeen, with 16.4% under 16, as opposed to the national average of 19.2%. According to the 2011 census Aberdeen is 91.9% white, ethnically, 24.7% were born outside Scotland, higher than the national average of 16%. Of this population, 7.6% were born in other parts of the UK. 8.2% of Aberdonians stated to be from an ethnic minority (non-white) in the 2011 census, with 9,519 (4.3%) being Asian, with 3,385 (1.5%) coming from India and 2,187 (1.0%) being Chinese. The city has around 5,610 (2.6%) residents of African or Caribbean origin, which is a higher percentage than both Glasgow and Edinburgh.

In the household, there were 97,013 individual dwellings recorded in the city, of which 61% were privately owned, 9% privately rented and 23% rented from the council. The most popular type of dwellings are apartments which comprise 49% of residences followed by semi-detached at just below 22%. The median income of a household in the city is £16,813 (the mean income is £20,292) (2005) which places approximately 18% households in the city below the poverty line (defined as 60% of the mean income). Conversely, an Aberdeen postcode has the second highest number of millionaires of any postcode in the UK.

=== Ethnicity ===
Ethnic Group	1991		2001		2011		2022	
Ethnic Group	Number	%	Number	%	Number	%	Number	%
White: Total	201,886	98.53%	205,974	97.1%	204,715	91.88%	193,921	86.56%
White: Scottish	–	–	181,718	85.66%	167,727	75.28%	151,844	67.78%
White: Other British	–	–	16,682	7.86%	16,910	7.6%	16,680	7.5%
White: Irish	1,251	0.61%	1,531	0.7%	2,213	1%	1,963	0.9%
White: Gypsy/Traveller (Note: New category created for the 2011 census)	–	–	–	–	279	0.1%	234	0.1%
White: Polish	–	–	–	–	7,031	3.2%	9,876	4.4%
White: Other	–	–	6,043	2.8%	10,555	4.7%	13,330	6.0%
Asian, Asian Scottish or Asian British: Total	1,817	0.88%	3,240	1.52%	9,519	4.27%	13,091	5.84%
Asian, Asian Scottish or Asian British: Indian	303	0.1%	837	0.4%	3,384	1.5%	5,021	2.2%
Asian, Asian Scottish or Asian British: Pakistani	154	0.1%	407	0.2%	1,042	0.5%	1,834	0.8%
Asian, Asian Scottish or Asian British: Bangladeshi	165	0.1%	336	0.2%	587	0.3%	997	0.5%
Asian, Asian Scottish or Asian British: Chinese	708	0.3%	1,199	0.6%	2,187	1%	2,255	1%
Asian, Asian Scottish or Asian British: Asian Other	487	0.2%	461	0.2%	2,319	1%	2,984	1.3%
Black, Black Scottish or Black British (Note: Category restructured for the 2011 census)	521	0.25%	94	–	–	–	–	–
African: Total	–	–	722	0.34%	5,042	2.26%	8,870	3.96%
African: African, African Scottish or African British	–	–	722	0.34%	5,009	2.2%	587	0.3%
African: Other African	–	–	–	–	33	–	8,280	3.7%
Caribbean or Black: Total	–	–	159	–	588	0.26%	549	0.25%
Caribbean	–	–	159	–	296	0.1%	161	–
Black	–	–	–	–	214	0.1%	19	–
Caribbean or Black: Other	–	–	–	–	78	–	369	0.16%
Mixed or multiple ethnic groups: Total	–	–	863	0.4%	1,488	0.66%	3,990	1.78%
Other: Total	661	0.32%	1,073	0.5%	1,441	0.64%	3,597	1.61%
Other: Arab	–	–	–	–	993	0.44%	1,783	0.80%
Other: Any other ethnic group	661	0.32%	1,073	0.5%	448	0.2%	1,817	0.81%
Total:	204,885	100%	212,125	100%	222,793	100%	224,021	100%

Aberdeen compared
2011 United Kingdom census	Aberdeen	Scotland
Total population	222,793	5,295,000
Population growth 2001–2011	5.0%	5.0%

The proportion of people residing in Aberdeen born outside the UK was 21.1% in 2022, compared with 15.9% in 2011 and 6.3% in 2001. Below are the fifteen largest overseas-born groups in Aberdeen according to the 2022 census, alongside the two previous censuses.

Country of birth	2022	2011	2001
Poland	8,266	6,403	71
Nigeria	5,662	3,363	239
India	3,815	2,802	625
United States	1,379	1,346	1,081
Romania	1,330	308	33
Lithuania	1,229	823	0
Germany	1,170	1,458	1,003
Latvia	1,147	685	0
Ireland	1,059	1,378	775
Pakistan	948	550	180
China	788	921	199
Italy	788	356	217
Hungary	765	358	0
Spain	755	260	152
France	719	1,028	567
Overall – all overseas-born	47,197	35,436	13,264

=== Religion ===
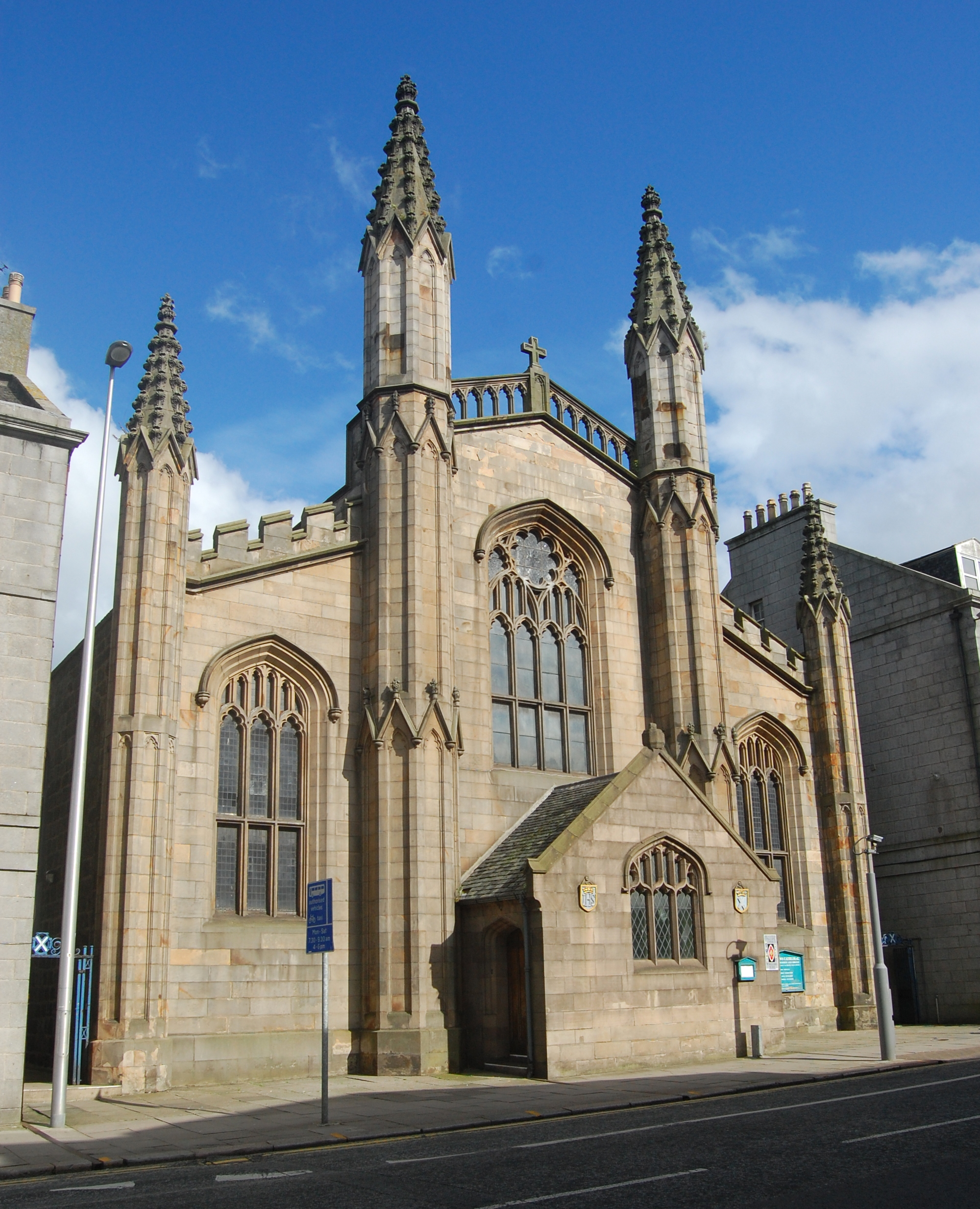
St Andrew's Cathedral, King Street

Religion of Aberdeen residents, 2022
No religion	58.0%
Christian	30.7%
Religion not stated	5.8%
Muslim	2.9%
Hindu	1.3%
Buddhist	0.5%
Pagan	0.4%
Other religion	0.3%
Sikh	0.07%
Jewish	0.06%
Source: 2022 census

Christianity is the main religion practised in the city. Aberdeen's largest denominations are the Church of Scotland (through the Presbytery of Aberdeen) and the Roman Catholic Church, both with numerous churches across the city, with the Scottish Episcopal Church having the third-largest number. The census in 2022 showed that Aberdeen has the highest proportion of non-religious residents of any city in Scotland, with 58% of citizens claiming to have no religion.

In the Middle Ages, the Kirk of St Nicholas was the only burgh kirk and one of Scotland's largest parish churches. Like a number of other Scottish kirks, it was subdivided after the Reformation, in this case into the East and West churches. At that time, the city also was home to houses of the Carmelites (Whitefriars) and Franciscans (Greyfriars). The latter survives in modified form as the chapel of Marischal College.

St Machar's Cathedral was built twenty years after David I (1124–1153) transferred the pre-Reformation diocese from Mortlach in Banffshire to Old Aberdeen in 1137. Except the episcopate of William Elphinstone (1484–1511), building progressed slowly. Gavin Dunbar, who followed him in 1518, completed the structure by adding the two western spires and the southern transept. It is now a congregation of the Church of Scotland. Aberdeen has two other cathedrals: St. Mary's Cathedral is a Roman Catholic cathedral in Gothic style, erected in 1859. In addition, St. Andrew's Cathedral serves the Scottish Episcopal Church. It was constructed in 1817 as Archibald Simpson's first commission and contains a memorial to the consecration of the first bishop of the Episcopal Church in the United States of America, which took place nearby. In 1804, St Peter's Church, the first permanent Roman Catholic church in the city after the Reformation was built.

Numerous other Protestant denominations have a presence in Aberdeen. The Salvation Army citadel on the Castlegate dominates the view of the east end of Union Street. In addition, there is a Unitarian church, established in 1833 and located in Skene Terrace. Christadelphians have been present in Aberdeen since at least 1844. Over the years, they have rented space to meet at a number of locations and currently meet in the Inchgarth Community Centre in Garthdee. There is also a Quaker meetinghouse on Crown Street, the only purpose built Friends meeting house in Scotland that is still in use today. In addition, there are a number of Baptist congregations in the city, and Evangelical congregations have been appearing in significant numbers since the late 2000s. The city also has two meeting houses of the Church of Jesus Christ of Latter-day Saints (LDS Church).

There are also four mosques in Aberdeen which serve the Islamic community in the city. There is an Orthodox Jewish Synagogue established in 1945. There is also a Thai Buddhist temple located in the Hazelhead area of the city. There are no formal Hindu buildings, although there is a fortnightly Hindu religious gathering on the first and third Sunday afternoons at Queens Cross Parish church hall. The University of Aberdeen has a small Baháʼí society.

=== Languages ===
The 2022 Scottish Census reported that out of 217,756 residents aged three and over, 76,650 (35.2%) considered themselves able to speak or read the Scots language.

The 2022 Scottish Census reported that out of 217,760 residents aged three and over, 2,919 (1.3%) considered themselves able to speak or read Gaelic.

== Economy ==
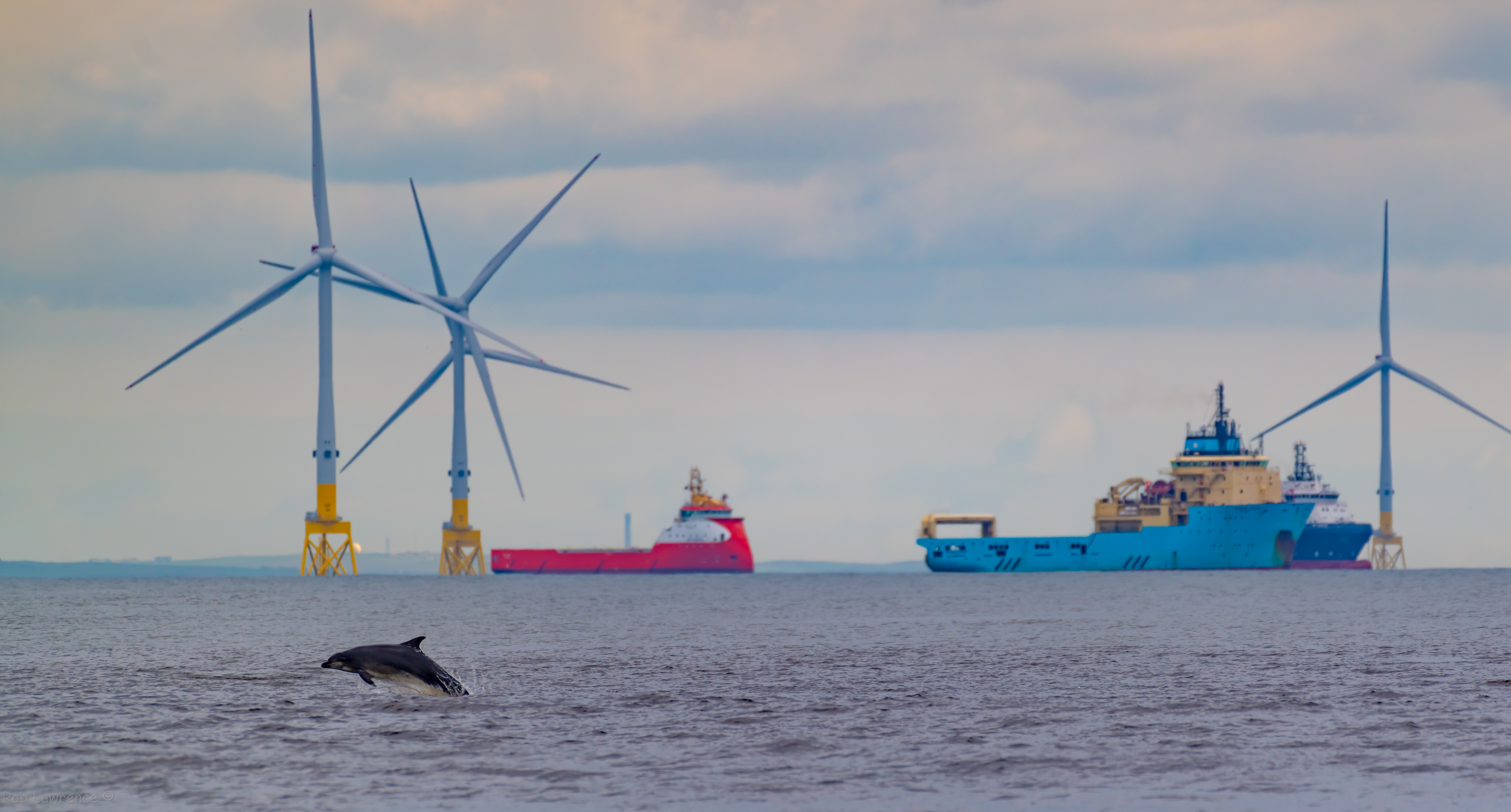
Ships off the coast of Aberdeen in the North Sea, supporting the production of North Sea oil and gas

Traditionally, Aberdeen was home to fishing, textile mills, shipbuilding and paper-making. These industries have been largely replaced. High technology developments in the electronics design and development industry, research in agriculture and fishing and the oil industry, which have been largely responsible for Aberdeen's economic growth, are now major parts of Aberdeen's economy.

Until the 1970s, most of Aberdeen's leading industries dated from the 18th century; mainly these were textiles, foundry work, shipbuilding and paper-making, the oldest industry in the city, with paper having been first made there in 1694. Paper-making has reduced in importance since the closures of Donside Paper Mill in 2001 and the Davidson Mill in 2005 leaving the Stoneywood Paper Mill with a workforce of approximately 500. Textile production ended in 2004 when Richards of Aberdeen closed.

Grey granite was quarried at Rubislaw quarry for more than 300 years, and used for paving setts, kerb and building stones, and monumental and other ornamental pieces. Aberdeen granite was used to build the terraces of the Houses of Parliament and Waterloo Bridge in London. Quarrying finally ceased in 1971. The current owners have begun pumping 40 years of rainwater from the quarry to develop a heritage centre on the site.

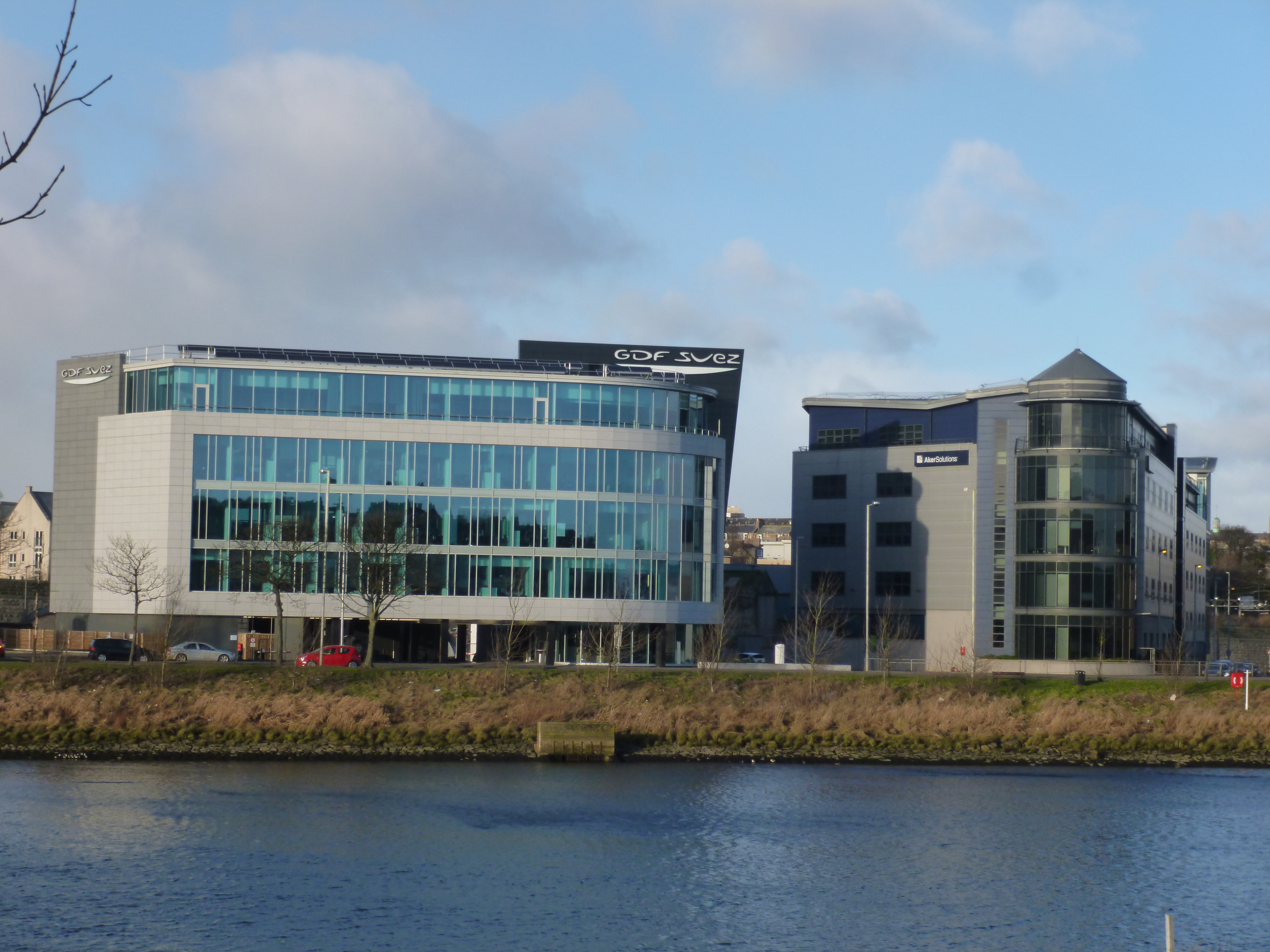
Neptune Energy and Aker Solutions Buildings, North Dee Business Quarter. An example of modern offices becoming more prevalent in Aberdeen's City Centre

In-shore fishing was once the predominant industry but was surpassed by deep-sea fisheries, which derived a great impetus from improved technologies throughout the 20th century. Catches have fallen because of overfishing and the use of the harbour by oil support vessels, and so although still an important fishing port it is now eclipsed by the more northerly ports of Peterhead and Fraserburgh. The Fisheries Research Services are headquartered in Aberdeen, and there is a marine research laboratory there.

Aberdeen is well regarded for the agricultural and soil research carried out at The James Hutton Institute (formerly the Macaulay Land Use Research Institute), which has close links to the city's two universities. The Rowett Research Institute is a world-renowned research centre for studies into food and nutrition located in Aberdeen. It has produced three Nobel laureates and there is a high concentration of life scientists working in the city.

As oil reserves in the North Sea decrease, there is an effort to rebrand Aberdeen as the energy capital of Europe rather than the oil capital, and there is interest in the development of new energy sources, and technology transfer from oil into renewable energy and other industries is underway. The "Energetica" initiative led by Scottish Enterprise has been designed to accelerate this process. Aberdeen has become a major world centre for undersea petroleum technology.

=== North Sea oil and gas ===
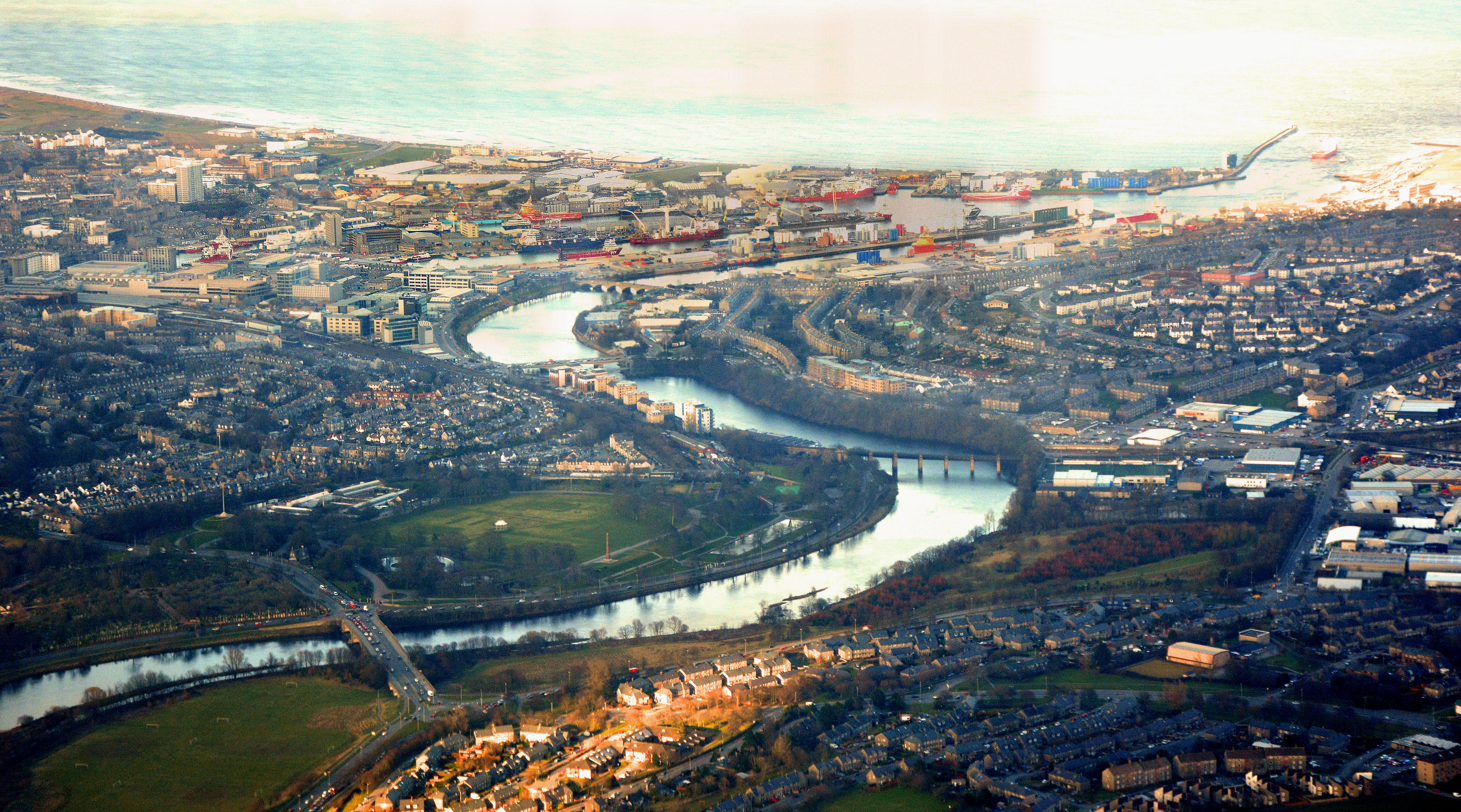
Aberdeen Harbour

Aberdeen had been a major maritime centre throughout the 19th century, when a group of local entrepreneurs launched the first steam-powered trawler. The steam trawling industry expanded and by 1933 Aberdeen was Scotland's top fishing port, employing nearly 3,000 men with 300 vessels sailing from its harbour. By the time oil was coming on stream, much of the trawling fleet had relocated to Peterhead.

Geologists had speculated about oil and gas in the North Sea since the middle of the 20th century, but tapping its deep and inhospitable waters was another story. With the Middle Eastern oil sheiks becoming more aware of the political and economic power of their oil reserves and government threats of rationing, the industry began to consider the North Sea as a viable source of oil. Exploration commenced in the 1960s and the first major find in the British sector was in November 1970 in the Forties field, 110 miles (180 km) east of Aberdeen.

By late 1975, after years of intense construction, the necessary infrastructure was in place. Oil flowed through the Forties pipeline system directly to the refinery at far-away Grangemouth.

=== Business ===
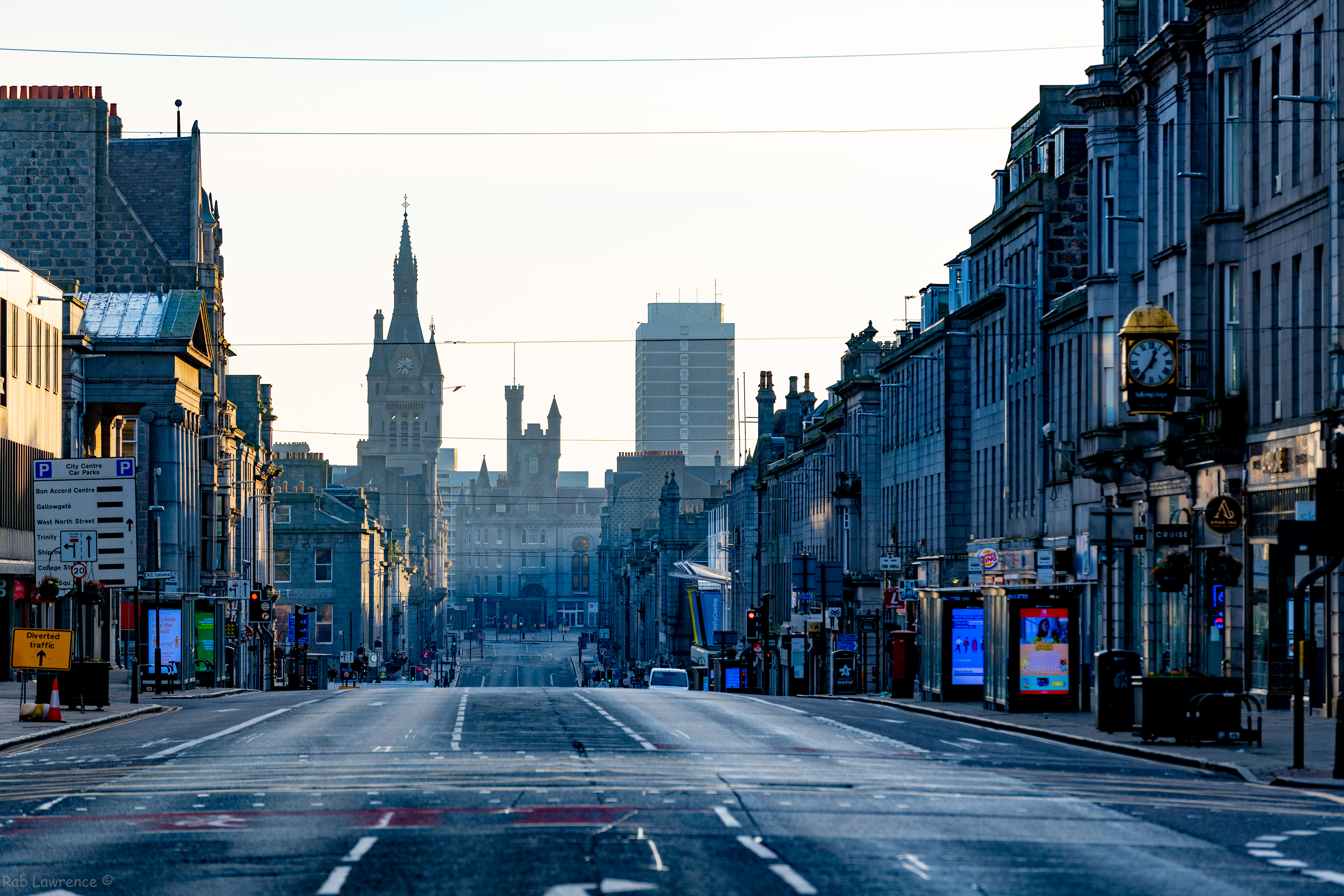
Union Street towards Castlegate (facing east)

In 2011, the Centre for Cities named Aberdeen as the best-placed city for growth in Britain, as the country looked to emerge from the recent economic downturn. With energy still providing the backbone of the local economy, recent years have seen very large new investment in the North Sea owing to rising oil prices and favourable government tax incentives. This has led to several oil majors and independents building new global offices in the city.

Five of Scotland's top ten businesses are based in Aberdeen with a collective turnover of £14 billion, yielding a profit in excess of £2.4 billion. Alongside this 29 of Scotland's top 100 businesses are located in Aberdeen with an employment rate of 77.9%, making it the second highest UK city for employment.

Figures released in 2016 ranked Aberdeen as having the second highest number of patents processed per person in the UK.

=== Shopping ===
The traditional shopping streets are Union Street and George Street, now complemented by shopping centres, including the Bon Accord Centre and the Trinity Shopping Centre. A £190 million retail development, Union Square, reached completion in late September/early October 2009. Major retail parks away from the city centre include the Berryden Retail Park, the Kittybrewster Retail Park and the Beach Boulevard Retail Park. Aberdeen Market has been rebuilt twice, but closed in 2020.

In March 2004, Aberdeen was awarded Fairtrade City status by the Fairtrade Foundation.

== Landmarks ==
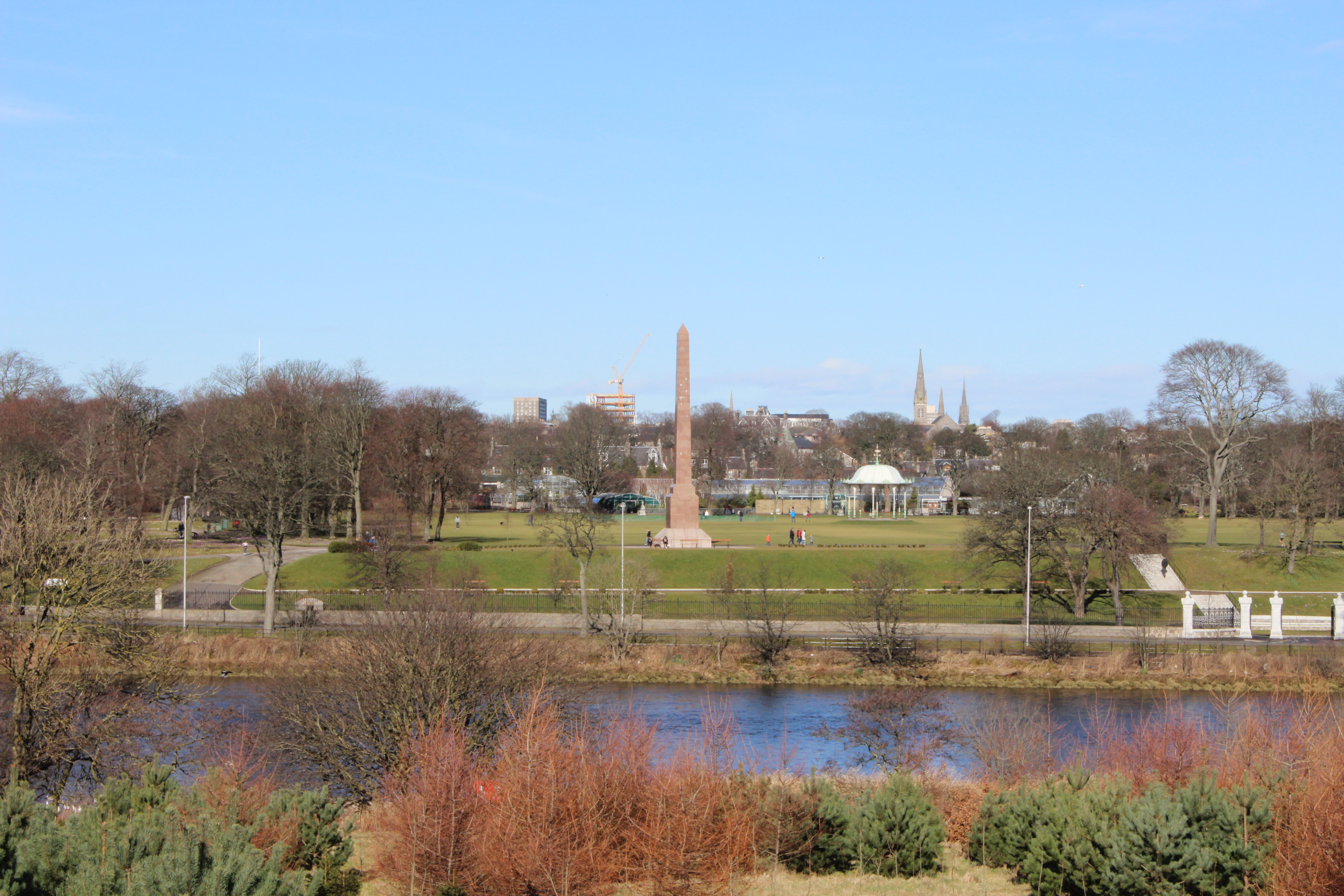
Duthie Park

Aberdeen's architecture is known for its principal use during the Victorian era of granite, which has led to its local nickname of the Granite City.

Amongst the notable buildings in the city's main street, Union Street, are the Town and County Bank, the Music Hall, the Trinity Hall of the incorporated trades (originating between 1398 and 1527, although completely rebuilt in the 1860s), now a shopping mall; the former office of the Northern Assurance Company, and the National Bank of Scotland. In Castle Street, a continuation eastwards of Union Street, is the new Aberdeen Town House, a very prominent landmark in Aberdeen, built between 1868 and 1873 to a design by Peddie and Kinnear.

Alexander Marshall Mackenzie's extension to Marischal College on Broad Street, opened by King Edward VII in 1906, created the second largest granite building in the world (after the Escorial, Madrid).

In addition to the many fine landmark buildings, Aberdeen has many prominent public statues, three of the most notable being William Wallace at the junction between Union Terrace and Rosemount Viaduct, Robert Burns on Union Terrace above Union Terrace Gardens, and Robert the Bruce holding aloft the charter he issued to the city in 1319 on Broad Street, outside Marischal College.

Aberdeen has long been famous for its 45 parks and gardens, and citywide floral displays which include two million roses, eleven million daffodils and three million crocuses. The city has won the Royal Horticultural Society's Britain in Bloom 'Best City' award ten times, the overall Scotland in Bloom competition twenty times and the large city category every year since 1968. However, despite recent spurious reports, Aberdeen has never been banned from the Britain in Bloom competition. The city won the 2006 Scotland in Bloom "Best City" award along with the International Cities in Bloom award. The suburb of Dyce also won the Small Towns award.

Duthie Park opened in 1883 on the north bank of the River Dee. It was named after and given to the city by Miss Elizabeth Crombie Duthie of Ruthrieston in 1881. Hazlehead Park, is large and forested, and located on the outskirts of the city. Johnston Gardens is a small park of one hectare in the west end of the city. In 2002, the garden was named the best garden in the British Islands. Seaton Park, formerly the grounds of a private house, is on the edge of the grounds of St Machar's Cathedral and was acquired for the city in 1947.

Aberdeen has hosted several theatres throughout its history, some of which have been converted or destroyed. The most famous include:

- His Majesty's Theatre (HMT), on Rosemount Viaduct
- The Tivoli, on Guild Street
- Capitol Theatre, on Union Street
- Aberdeen Arts Centre, on King Street
- The Palace Theatre, on Bridge Street
- The main concert hall is the Music Hall on Union Street, built in 1822.

== Transport ==
=== Railway ===
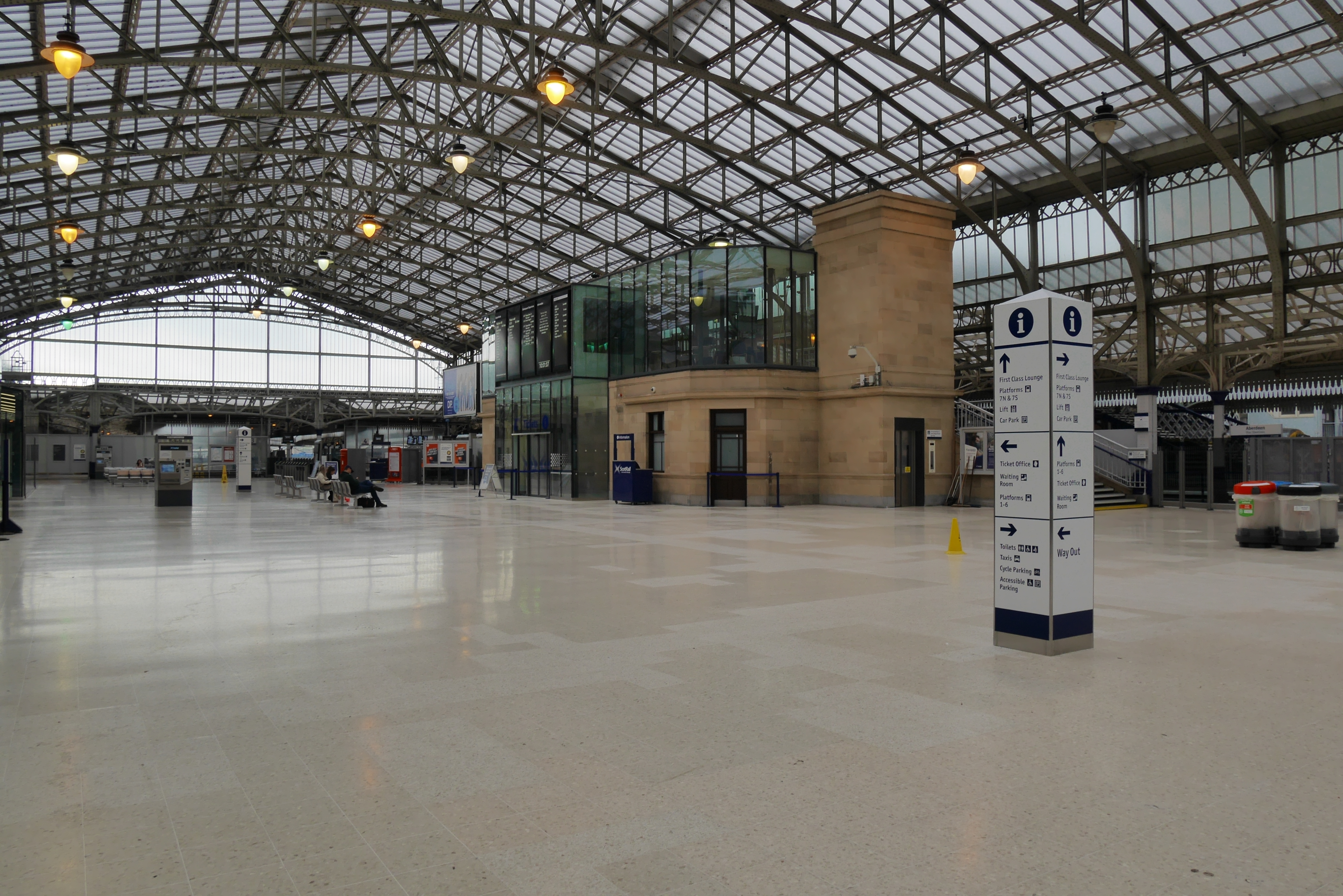
Aberdeen Station concourse in 2022

Aberdeen railway station is served by four train operating companies:

- ScotRail operates frequent direct trains to Scotland's major cities: Edinburgh, Glasgow and Inverness; it also runs local services to Inverurie and Montrose
- London North Eastern Railway operates services on the East Coast Main Line to Edinburgh, Newcastle, York, Doncaster and London King's Cross
- CrossCountry operates services to Plymouth and Edinburgh. The train to Plymouth was part of the UK's previous longest direct passenger train which took 13 hours and 23 minutes to reach Penzance. The service to Penzance ceased operation on 16 May 2025 and now terminates in Plymouth, and no longer holds the title for the UK's longest direct rail journey.
- Caledonian Sleeper runs overnight sleeper services to and from London Euston.

Today, all railway services to the south run via Dundee. The faster main line from Aberdeen to Perth via Forfar and Strathmore closed in 1967, as a result of the Beeching cuts; the faster main line from Perth to Edinburgh via Glenfarg also closed subsequently in 1970.

A second station, at Dyce, serves the north of the city centre; it is on the Aberdeen–Inverness line.

=== Roads ===
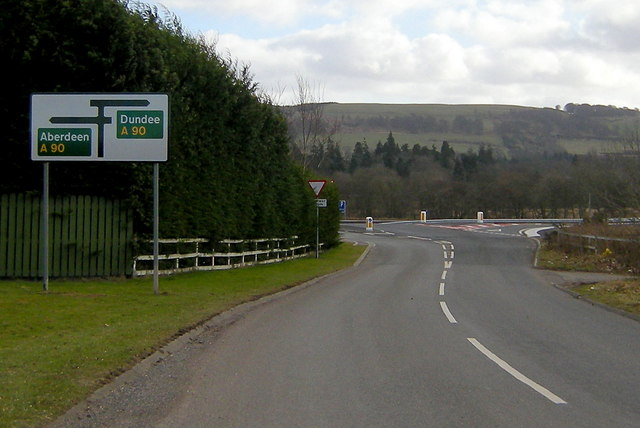
A90 Road

There are six major roads in and out of the city:

- The A90 is the main arterial route into the city from the north and south, linking Aberdeen to Edinburgh (via the M90), Dundee, Brechin and Perth in the south and Ellon, Peterhead and Fraserburgh in the north. In 2019, the Aberdeen Western Peripheral Route bypass was completed
- The A96 links Elgin and Inverness and the north-west
- The A93 is the main route to the west, heading towards Royal Deeside and the Cairngorms. After Braemar, it turns south, providing an alternative tourist route to Perth.
- The A944 also heads west, through Westhill and on to Alford.
- The A92 was the original southerly road to Aberdeen prior to the building of the A90; it is now used as a tourist route, connecting the city to the towns of Montrose and Arbroath, and to the east coast.
- The A947 exits the city at Dyce and continues to Newmachar, Oldmeldrum, Turriff, Banff and Macduff.

=== Buses and coaches ===
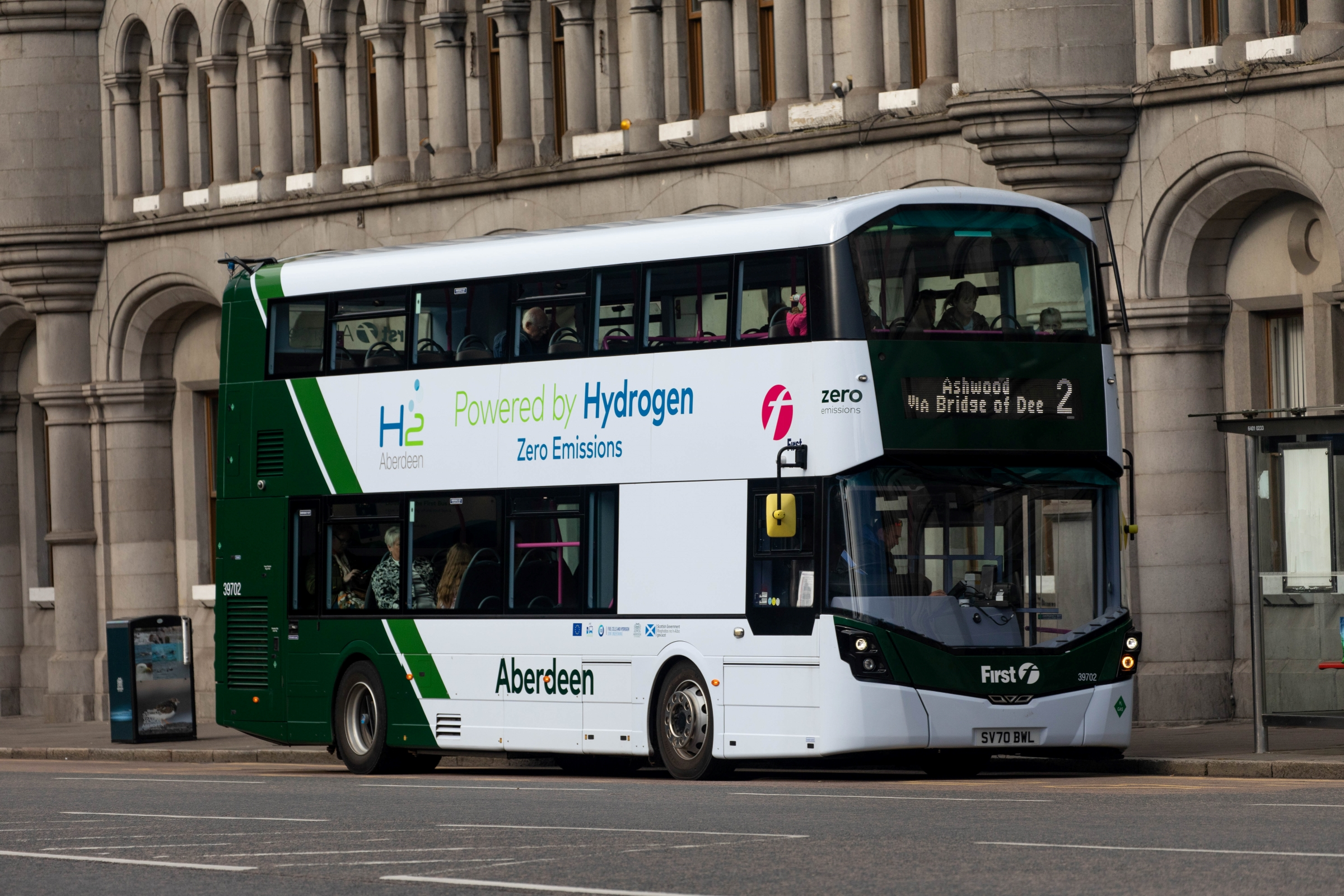
First Aberdeen Wright Streetdeck Hydroliner

First Aberdeen operates the majority of city bus services, as the successor to Grampian Regional Transport (GRT) and Aberdeen Corporation Tramways. Secondary operators include Stagecoach Bluebird and Stagecoach South Scotland.

Aberdeen is the global headquarters of parent company FirstGroup, having grown from the GRT Group. First is still based at the former Aberdeen Tramways depot on King Street, which has now been redeveloped into a new headquarters and bus depot.

Coach services are operated by:

- National Express runs express coach services to London twice daily
- Bruce's Coaches of Salsburgh runs the 590 service, which leaves in the morning and calls at Dundee, Perth, Glasgow, Hamilton, Carlisle, Milton Keynes and London Victoria
- Parks of Hamilton operates the overnight 592, which calls at Dundee, Glasgow, Hamilton, Carlisle, Heathrow Airport and London Victoria.

On 18 April 2025, the "Aberdeen Adventurer" tour bus scheme ran by McGill's Bus Services was launched with 10 stops around the city on a 75-minute loop. Stops include King's College, Pittodrie Stadium and the Aberdeen Art Gallery with the service due to end on 20 September 2026.

=== Air ===
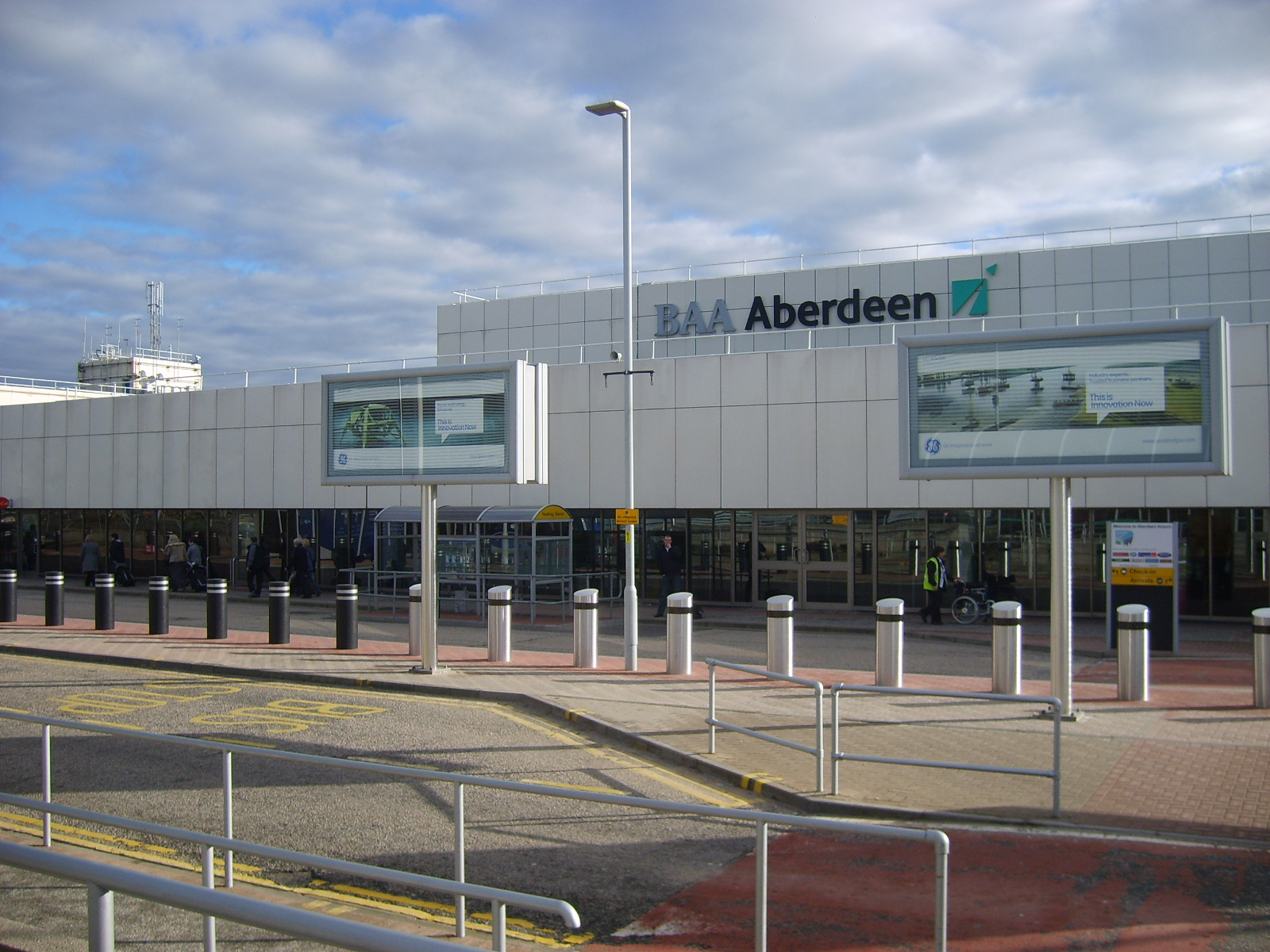
Aberdeen Airport in 2011

Aberdeen International Airport (ABZ), sited in Dyce in the north of the city, serves domestic and international destinations in France, the Netherlands, Spain, Ireland and Scandinavian countries. The heliport, which serves the oil industry and rescue services, is one of the world's busiest commercial heliports.

=== Cycling ===
Aberdeen is connected to the UK's National Cycle Network; it has a track to the south, connecting to cities including Dundee and Edinburgh, and one to the north that forks about 10 miles (15 km) from the city into two different tracks heading to Inverness and Fraserburgh respectively. Two popular shared-use paths, along old railway lines, are the Deeside Way to Banchory (which will eventually connect to Ballater) and the Formartine and Buchan Way to Ellon, both used by a mixture of cyclists, walkers and occasionally horses.

In May 2026, a self-service e-bike hire scheme was introduced in Aberdeen, operated by Voi Technology. Some 350 bikes are available on a pay-as-you-go basis. The scheme replaced an earlier bike hire scheme which was operated between 2022 and 2024 by The Big Issue and Sharebike but which was scrapped because of funding issues as well as vandalism.

=== Water ===
Aberdeen Harbour is important as the largest in the north of Scotland and serves the ferry route to Orkney and Shetland. Established in 1136, the harbour has been referred to as the "oldest business in Britain".

The Dee Estuary, Aberdeen's harbour, started out as a fishing port, moving on to steam trawlers and serving the oil industry; it is now a major port of departure for the Baltic and Scandinavia.

== Education ==
=== Universities and colleges ===
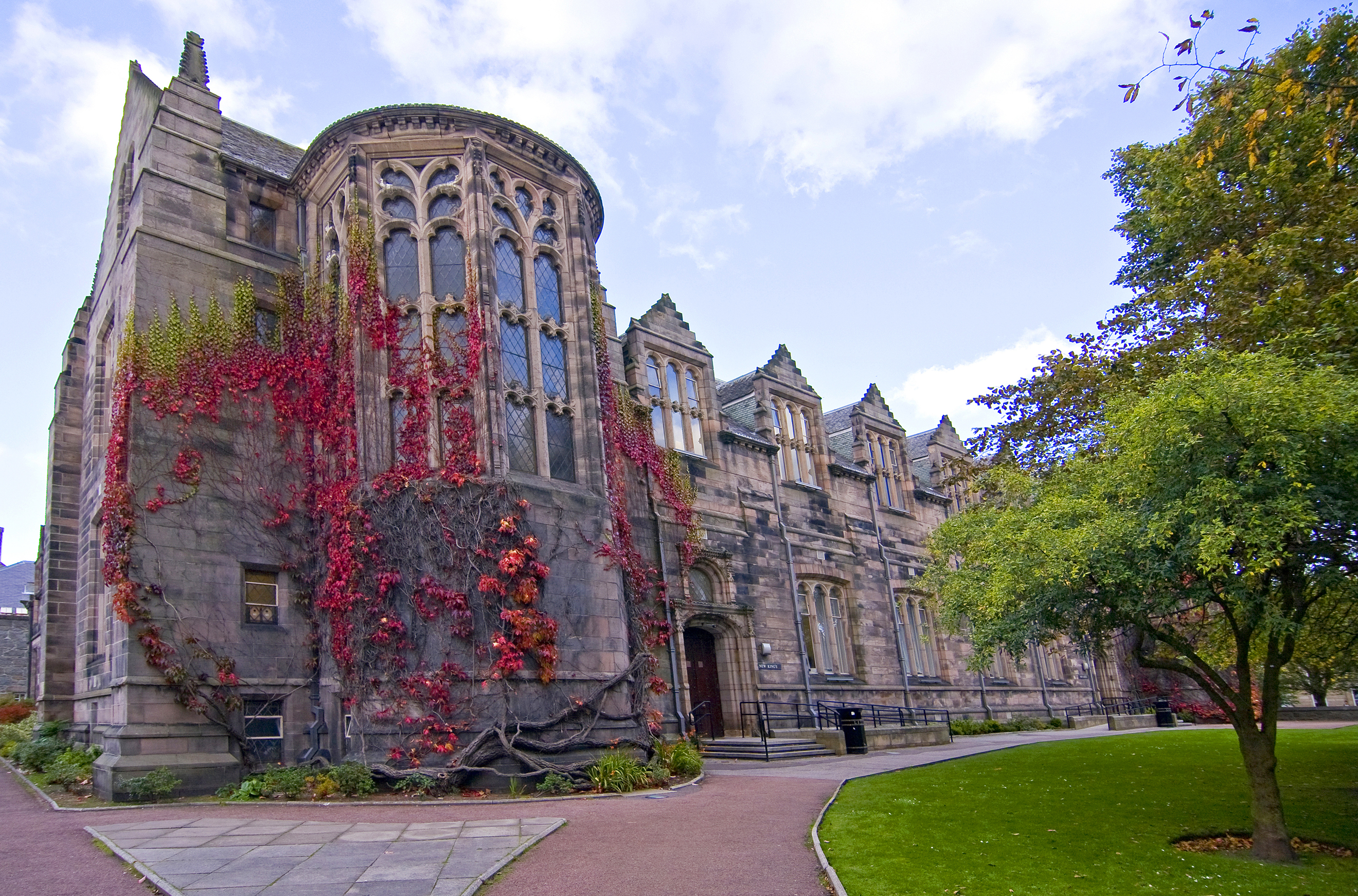
The New King's College building of the University of Aberdeen

Aberdeen has two universities, the ancient University of Aberdeen, and Robert Gordon University, a modern university often referred to as RGU. Aberdeen has a high proportion of students of 11.5%, higher than the national average of 7%.

The University of Aberdeen began as King's College, Aberdeen, which was founded in 1495 by William Elphinstone (1431–1514), Bishop of Aberdeen and Chancellor of Scotland. Marischal College, a separate institution, was founded in New Aberdeen by George Keith, fifth Earl Marischal of Scotland in 1593. These institutions were merged by the Universities (Scotland) Act 1858 to form the University of Aberdeen. The university is the fifth oldest in the English-speaking world and offers degrees in a full range of disciplines. Its main campus is in Old Aberdeen in the north of the city and it currently has approximately 14,000 students. The university's debating society is the oldest in Scotland, founded in 1848 as the King's College Debating Society. Today, Aberdeen is consistently ranked among the top 200 universities in the world and is ranked within the top 20 universities in the United Kingdom. Aberdeen was also named the 2019 Scottish University of the Year by The Times and Sunday Times Good University Guide. In early 2022, Aberdeen opened the Science Teaching Hub.

Robert Gordon's College (originally Robert Gordon's Hospital) was founded in 1750 by the merchant Robert Gordon, grandson of the map maker Robert Gordon of Straloch, and was further endowed in 1816 by Alexander Simpson of Collyhill. Originally devoted to the instruction and maintenance of the sons of poor burgesses of guild and trade in the city, it was reorganised in 1881 as a day and night school for secondary and technical education. In 1903, the vocational education component of the college was designated a Central Institution and was renamed as the Robert Gordon Institute of Technology in 1965. In 1992, university status was awarded and it became Robert Gordon University. The university has expanded and developed significantly in recent years, and was named Best Modern University in the UK for 2012 by The Sunday Times. It was previously The Sunday Times Scottish University of the Year for 2011, primarily because of its record on graduate employment. The citation for the 2011 award read: "With a graduate unemployment rate that is lower than the most famous universities, including Oxford and Cambridge, plus a flourishing reputation for research, high student satisfaction rates and ambitious plans for its picturesque campus, the Robert Gordon University is The Sunday Times Scottish University of the Year".

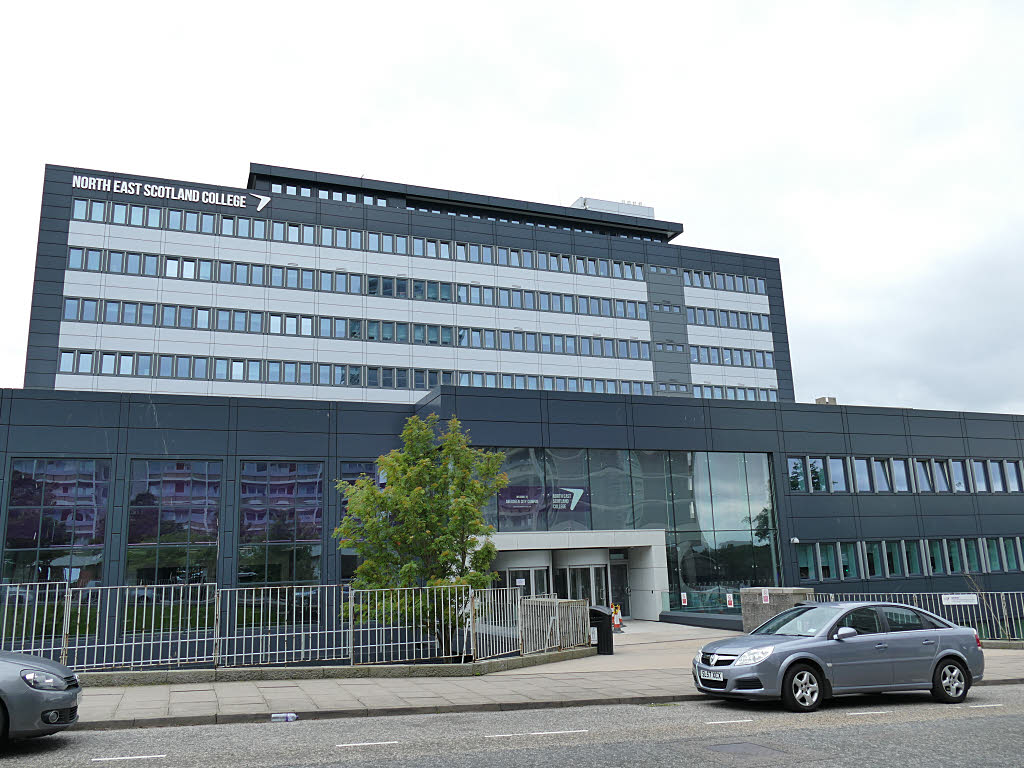
North East Scotland College

Aberdeen is also home to two artistic schools: Gray's School of Art, founded in 1886, which is one of the oldest established colleges of art in the UK. Scott Sutherland School of Architecture and Built Environment, was one of the first architectural schools to have its training courses recognised by the Royal Institute of British Architects. Both are now part of Robert Gordon University and are based at its Garthdee campus. North East Scotland College has several campuses in the city and offers a wide variety of part-time and full-time courses leading to several different qualifications in science. The Scottish Agricultural College is based just outside Aberdeen, on the Craibstone Estate. This is situated beside the roundabout for Aberdeen Airport on the A96. The college provides three services—Learning, Research and Consultancy. The college features many land-based courses such as Agriculture, Countryside Management, Sustainable Environmental Management and Rural Business Management. There are a variety of courses from diplomas to master's degrees. The Marine Laboratory Aberdeen, which specialises in fisheries, Macaulay Land Use Research Institute (soil science), and the Rowett Research Institute (animal nutrition) are some other higher education institutions.

The Aberdeen College of Performing Arts also provides full-time Drama and Musical Theatre training at Further Education level.

=== Schools ===
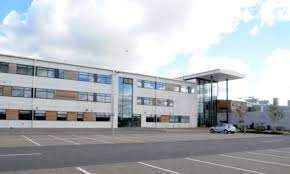
Cults Academy, established in 1967

There are currently 15 secondary schools and 54 primary schools which are run by the city council. There are a number of private schools in Aberdeen: Robert Gordon's College, Albyn School, St Margaret's School for Girls, the International School of Aberdeen and a Waldorf/Steiner School.

State primary schools in Aberdeen include Airyhall Primary School, Ashley Road Primary School, Bramble Brae Primary School, Broomhill Primary School, Cornhill Primary School (the city's largest), Culter Primary School, Cults Primary School, Danestone Primary School, Fernielea Primary School, Ferryhill Primary School, Gilcomstoun Primary School, Glashieburn Primary School, Greenbrae School, Hamilton School, Kaimhill Primary School, Kingsford Primary School, Kittybrewster Primary School, Middleton Park Primary School, Mile End School, Muirfield Primary School, Skene Square Primary School, and St. Joseph's Primary School.

State secondary schools in Aberdeen include Aberdeen Grammar School, Bridge of Don Academy, Bucksburn Academy, Cults Academy, Dyce Academy, Harlaw Academy, Hazlehead Academy, Lochside Academy, Northfield Academy, Oldmachar Academy and St Machar Academy.

Independent primary and secondary schools in Aberdeen include Albyn School, Robert Gordon's College, St Margaret's School for Girls, and the International School of Aberdeen.

== Culture ==
The city has a wide range of cultural activities, amenities, and museums, and is regularly visited by Scotland's National Arts Companies. It was awarded the Nicholson Trophy for the best-kept town at the Britain in Bloom contest in 1975.

=== Galleries and museums ===
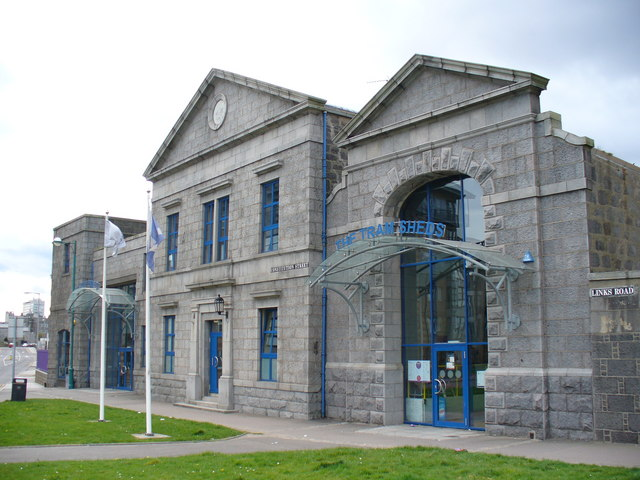
Aberdeen Science Centre, Links Road Science Museum

The Aberdeen Art Gallery houses a collection of Impressionist, Victorian, Scottish and 20th-century British paintings as well as collections of silver and glass. It also includes The Alexander Macdonald Bequest, a collection of late 19th-century works donated by the museum's first benefactor and a constantly changing collection of contemporary work and regular visiting exhibitions. The Aberdeen Art Gallery reopened in 2019 after a four-year refurbishment costing £34.6m.

The Aberdeen Maritime Museum, located in Shiprow, tells the story of Aberdeen's links with the sea from the days of sail and clipper ships to the latest oil and gas exploration technology. It includes an 8.5-metre-high (28 ft) model of the Murchison oil production platform and a 19th-century assembly taken from Rattray Head lighthouse Provost Ross' House is the second oldest dwelling house in the city. It was built in 1593 and became the residence of Provost John Ross of Arnage in 1702. The house retains some original medieval features, including a kitchen, fireplaces and beam-and-board ceilings. The Gordon Highlanders Museum tells the story of one of Scotland's best known regiments.

Provost Skene's House on Flourmill Lane dates from 1545 and is the oldest surviving townhouse in the city. It reopened in October 2021 after significant refurbishment costing £3.8m. One of the new exhibitions is a Hall of Heroes featuring 100 Aberdonians who have made a significant contribution to the city.

The Tollbooth Museum on the Castlegate (currently closed to visitors) is a former jail, which first opened as a public museum in 1995.

The Aberdeen Treasure Hub is a storage facility for Aberdeen Museums and Galleries containing over 100,000 items. The store is open for infrequent tours, for example as part of Doors Open Day.

Marischal Museum holds the principal collections of the University of Aberdeen, comprising some 80,000 items in the areas of fine art, Scottish history and archaeology, and European, Mediterranean and Near Eastern archaeology. The permanent displays and reference collections are augmented by regular temporary exhibitions, and since its closure to the public it now has a virtual online presence It closed to the public in 2008. The King's Museum acted as the university's main museum, but was closed during the COVID-19 lockdown, and has not subsequently reopened.

=== Festivals and performing arts ===
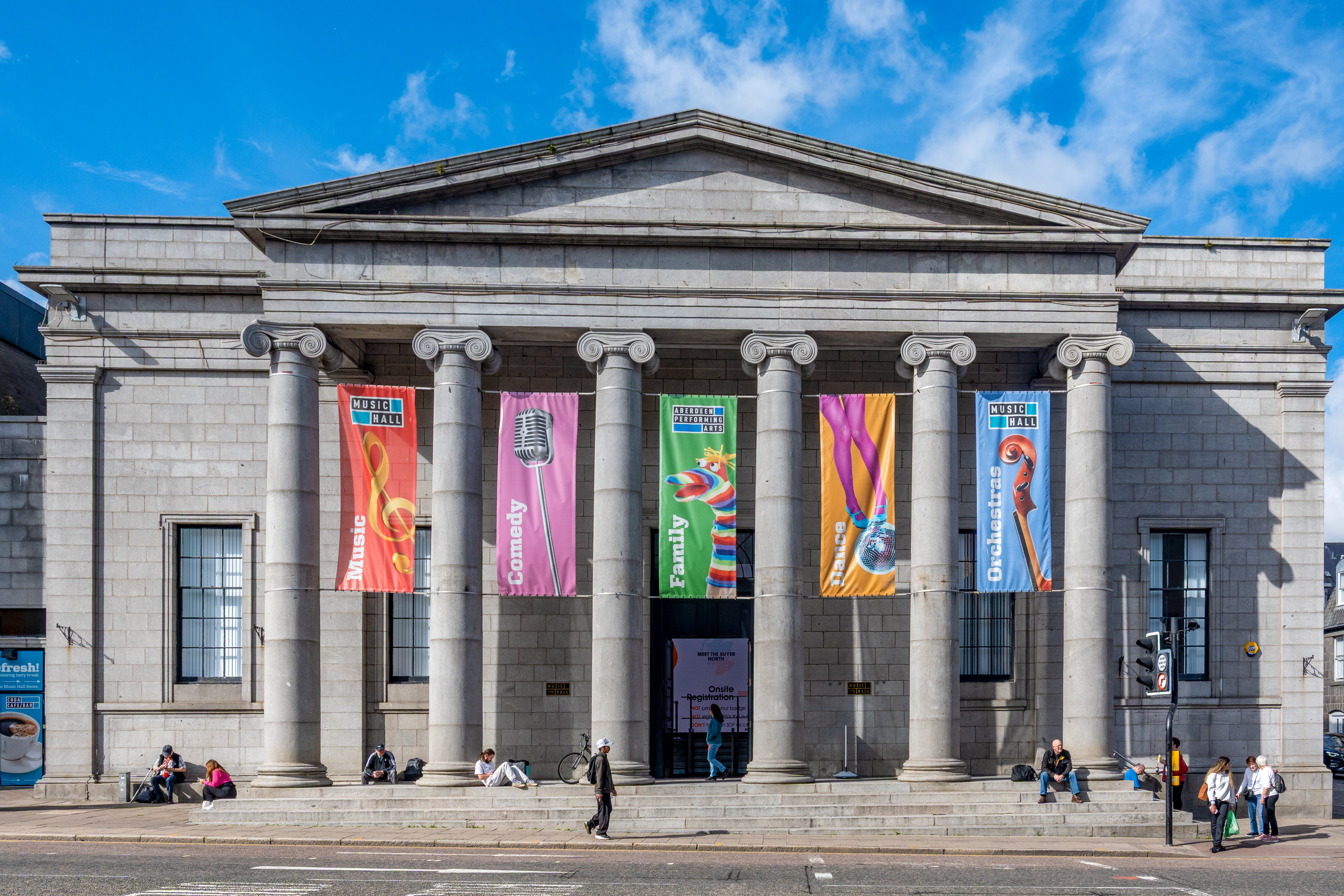
The Music Hall

Aberdeen is home to a number of events and festivals including the Aberdeen International Youth Festival (the world's largest arts festival for young performers), Aberdeen Jazz Festival, Aberdeen Alternative Festival, Rootin' Aboot (a folk and roots music event), Triptych, the University of Aberdeen's annual May Fest (formerly the Word festival) and DanceLive, Scotland's only festival of contemporary dance, produced by the city's Citymoves dance organisation.

The Aberdeen Student Show, performed annually without interruption since 1921, under the auspices of the Aberdeen Students' Charities Campaign, is the longest-running of its kind in the United Kingdom. It is written, produced and performed by students and graduates of Aberdeen's universities and higher education institutions. Since 1929—other than on a handful of occasions—it has been staged at His Majesty's Theatre.

National festivals which visited Aberdeen in 2012 included the British Science Festival in September, hosted by the University of Aberdeen but with events also taking place at Robert Gordon University and at other venues across the city. In February 2012 the University of Aberdeen also hosted the Inter Varsity Folk Dance Festival, the longest-running folk festival in the United Kingdom.

Aberdeen is home to Spectra, an annual light festival hosted in different locations across the city.

Aberdeen is home to Nuart, a festival showcasing street art around the city. The festival has run since 2017.

In 2020, the WayWORD Festival was launched by the University of Aberdeen WORD centre for creative writing. This yearly programme celebrates the arts through readings, performances, workshops and discussion panels. There have been many notable headliners including Val McDermid, Irvine Welsh and Douglas Stuart (writer).

Galas are held annually throughout the city, the most notable being the Culter Gala, which is usually held on the last Saturday of May.

=== Dialect ===
The local dialect of Lowland Scots is often known as Doric and is spoken not just in the city, but across the northeast of Scotland. It differs somewhat from other Scots dialects: most noticeable are the pronunciation "f" for what is normally written "wh" and "ee" for what in standard English would usually be written "oo" (Scots "ui"). Every year the annual Doric Festival takes place in Aberdeenshire to celebrate the history of the north-east's language.

=== Media and music ===
Aberdeen is home to Scotland's oldest newspaper the Press and Journal, a local and regional newspaper first published in 1747. The Press and Journal and its sister paper the tabloid Evening Express are printed six days a week by Aberdeen Journals. There was one free newspaper, the Aberdeen Citizen. BBC Scotland has a network studio production base in the city's Beechgrove area, and BBC Aberdeen produces The Beechgrove Potting Shed for radio while Tern Television produces The Beechgrove Garden. The city is also home to STV North (formerly Grampian Television), which produces the regional news programmes such as STV News at Six, as well as local commercials. The station, based at Craigshaw Business Park in Tullos, was based at larger studios in Queens Cross from September 1961 until June 2003.

There are three commercial radio stations operating in the city, Northsound 1, Greatest Hits Radio North East Scotland, and independent station Original 106, along with the community radio station shmuFM managed by Station House Media Unit which supports community members to run Aberdeen's full-time community radio station, broadcasting on 99.8 MHz FM.

Music venues include the Music Hall and the P&J Live.

=== Food ===
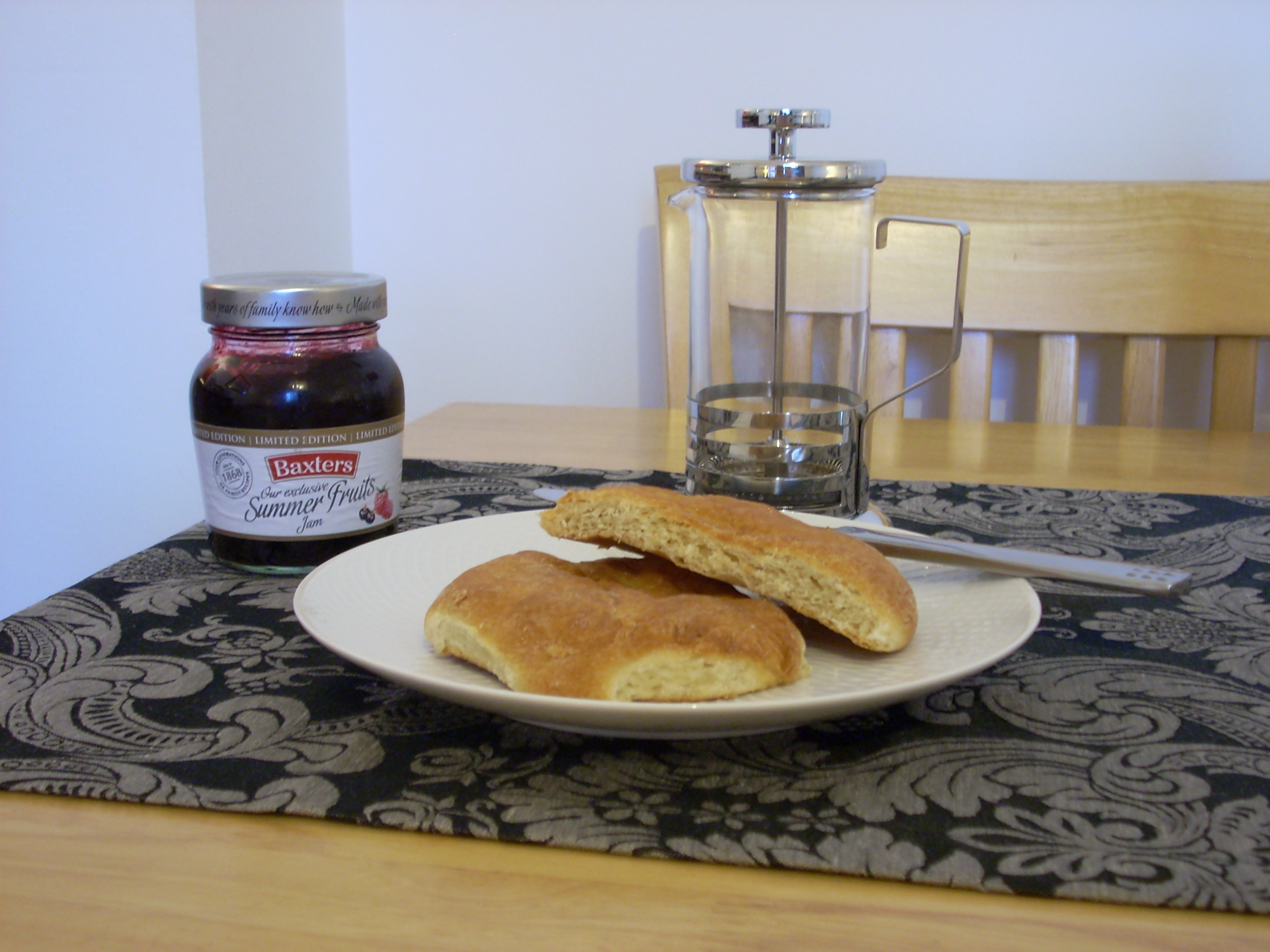
Aberdeen butteries, also known as rowies, served with jam

The Aberdeen region has given its name to a number of dishes, including the Aberdeen buttery (also known as "rowie") and Aberdeen Sausage.

In 2015, a study was published in The Scotsman which analysed the presence of branded fast food outlets in Scotland. Of the ten towns and cities analysed, Aberdeen was found to have the lowest per capita concentration, with just 0.12 stores per 1,000 inhabitants.

== Public services ==
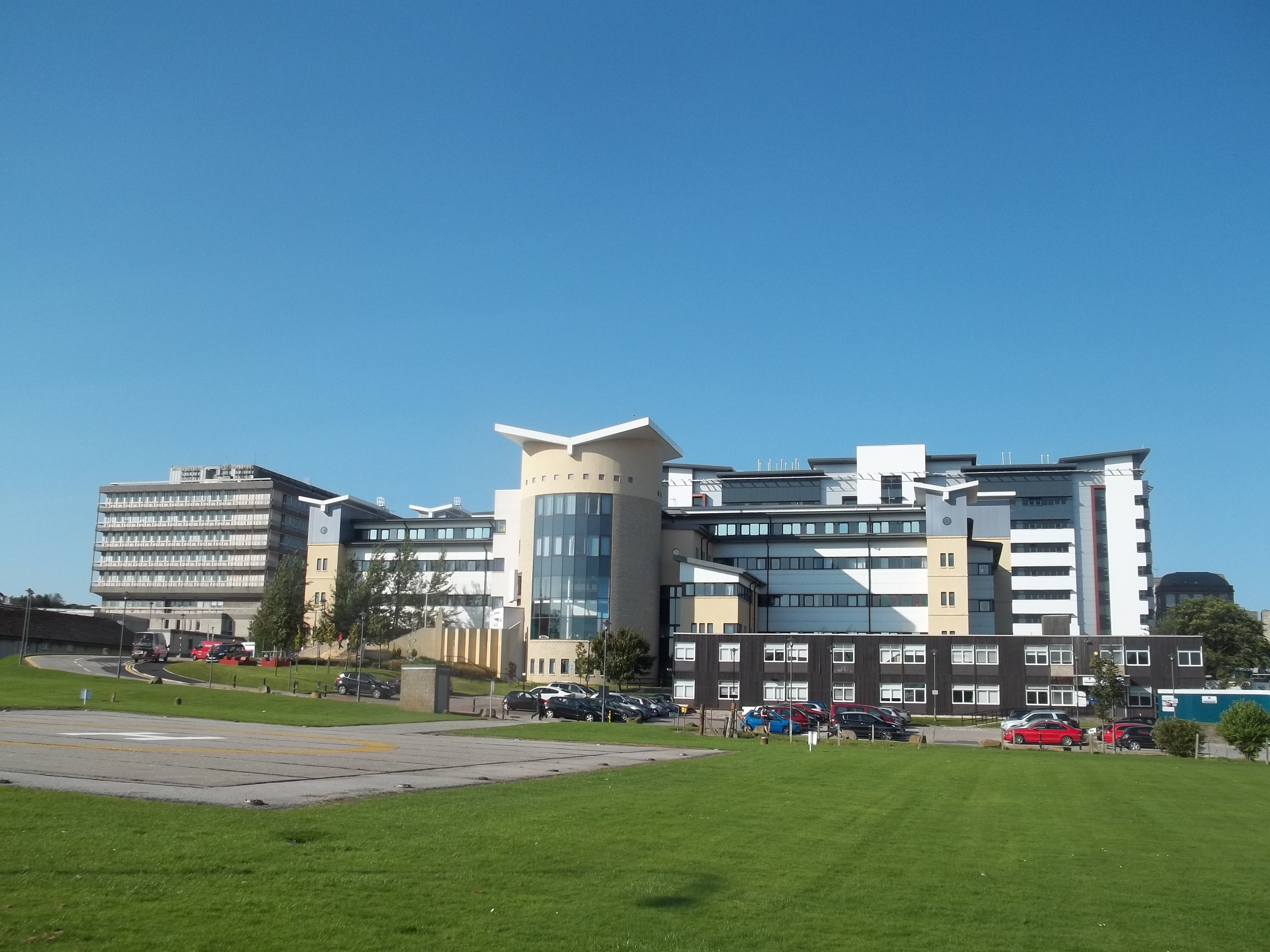
New Royal Aberdeen's Children Hospital and New Emergency Care Centre in background, Foresterhill, Aberdeen

The public health service in Scotland, NHS Scotland provides for the people of Aberdeen through the NHS Grampian health board. Aberdeen Royal Infirmary is the largest hospital in the city and one of the largest in Europe (the location of the city's A&E department), Royal Aberdeen Children's Hospital, a paediatric hospital, Royal Cornhill Hospital for mental health, Aberdeen Maternity Hospital, an antenatal hospital, Woodend Hospital, which specialises in rehabilitation and long-term illnesses and conditions, and City Hospital and Woolmanhill Hospital, which host several out-patient clinics and offices. Albyn Hospital is a private hospital located in the west end of the city.

Aberdeen City Council is responsible for city-owned infrastructure which is paid for by a mixture of Council Tax and income from the Scottish Government. Infrastructure and services run by the council include: nursery, primary and secondary education, roads, clearing snow in winter, city wardens, maintaining parks, refuse collection, economic development, public analyst, public mortuary, street cleaning and street lighting. Infrastructure in private hands includes electricity, gas and telecoms. Water and sewerage services are provided by Scottish Water.

- Police: Policing in Aberdeen is the responsibility of Police Scotland (the British Transport Police has responsibility for railways).
- Ambulance: The North East divisional headquarters of the Scottish Ambulance Service is located in Aberdeen.
- Fire and rescue: This is the responsibility of the Scottish Fire and Rescue Service.
- Lifeboat: The Royal National Lifeboat Institution operates Aberdeen Lifeboat Station. It is located at Victoria Dock Entrance in York Place.
- Animal Services: Stray dogs are housed under a contract with Mrs Murray's Cats and Dogs Home. https://www.aberdeencity.gov.uk/services/environment/dog-wardens/report-lost-found-or-stray-dog

== Sport ==
=== Football ===
The first ever recorded game of football, was outlined by teacher David Wedderburn in his book "Vocabula" written in 1633, during his time teaching at Aberdeen Grammar School.

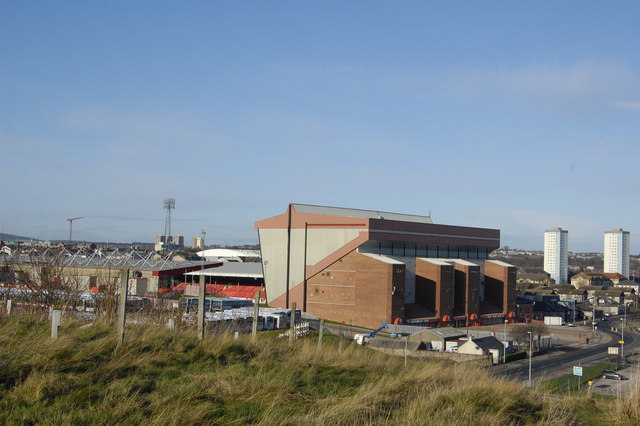
Pittodrie Stadium viewed from Broad Hill

There is one Aberdeen-based football club in the SPFL. Aberdeen F.C. (The Dons) play in the Scottish Premiership at Pittodrie Stadium. The club won the European Cup Winners Cup and the European Super Cup in 1983, the Scottish Premier League Championship four times (1955, 1980, 1984 and 1985), and the Scottish Cup eight times (1947, 1970, 1982, 1983, 1984, 1986, 1990 and 2025). Under the management of Alex Ferguson, Aberdeen was a major force in British football during the 1980s.

After 8 seasons in charge, the most recent of Managers Derek McInnes, was relieved of his duties, the club's failure to achieve anything more than 1 trophy in 24 competitions during his tenure and a recent run of games which saw 1 goal in ten matches ultimately proved costly for the Manager and his Assistant Tony Docherty. Under the management of McInnes the team won the 2014 Scottish League Cup and followed it up with a second-place league finish for the first time in more than 20 years in the following season. But it was over the last few seasons that results stagnated and McInnes was replaced by former Aberdeen and Newcastle player Stephen Glass. The current manager is Jimmy Thelin.

Cove Rangers, as of season 2024-25 play in League One, at the Balmoral Stadium in the suburb of Cove Bay. Cove won the Highland Football League championship in 2001, 2008, 2009, 2013 and 2019, winning the League Two play-offs in 2019 and earning promotion. At the point at which the 2019/20 League Two season was curtailed due to the COVID-19 pandemic, Cove were sitting top of the League Two table and were promoted as Champions.

Other local teams include Banks o'Dee who play at Spain Park in the Highland Football League and members of the SJFA North Region; Culter, Dyce, Stoneywood Parkvale, Glentanar, Sunnybank Hall Russell United, Bridge of Don Thistle and Hermes.

=== Rugby ===
Aberdeen hosted Caledonia Reds, a Scottish rugby team, before they merged with the Glasgow Warriors in 1998. The city is also home to the Scottish Premiership Division One rugby club Aberdeen GSFP RFC who play at Rubislaw Playing Fields, and Aberdeenshire RFC which was founded in 1875 and runs Junior, Senior Men's, Senior Ladies and Touch sections from the Woodside Sports Complex and also Aberdeen Wanderers RFC.

In 2005 the President of the SRU said it was hoped eventually to establish a professional team in Aberdeen. In November 2008 the city hosted a rugby international at Pittodrie between Scotland and Canada, with Scotland winning 41–0. In November 2010 the city once again hosted a rugby international at Pittodrie between Scotland and Samoa, with Scotland winning 19–16.

Aberdeen Warriors rugby league team play in the Rugby League Conference Division One. The Warriors also run Under 15's and 17's teams. Aberdeen Grammar School won the Saltire Schools Cup in 2011.

=== Golf ===
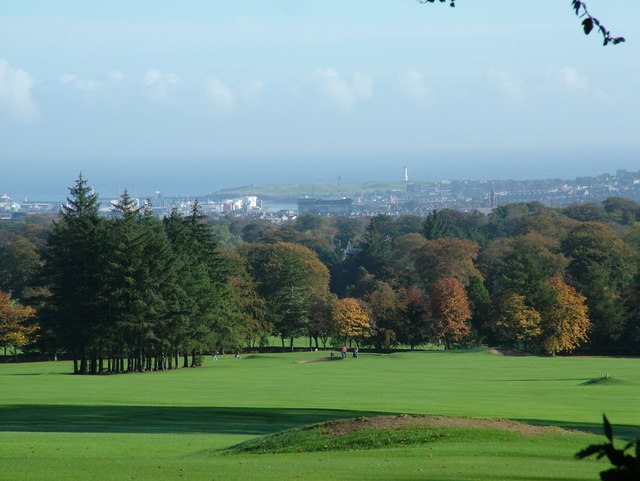
Hazlehead Golf Course

The Royal Aberdeen Golf Club, founded in 1780 is the sixth oldest golf club in the world, and hosted the Senior British Open in 2005, and the amateur team event the Walker Cup in 2011. Royal Aberdeen also hosted the Scottish Open in 2014, won by Justin Rose. The club has a second course, and there are public golf courses at Auchmill, Balnagask, Hazlehead and King's Links.

There are new courses planned for the area, including world-class facilities with major financial backing, the city and shire are set to become important in golf tourism. In Summer 2012, Donald Trump opened a new state of the art golf course at Menie, just north of the city, as the Trump International Golf Links, Scotland.

=== Ice Hockey ===
Ice hockey in Aberdeen boasts a history that began in the early 20th century. The Aberdeen Glaciarium on Forbesfield Road became a hub for games, featuring teams like the Grammar School Former Pupils and the Aberdeen Ice Hockey Club. However, the sport all but died out with the onset of WW1.

The sport was revived in the city with the opening of the Linx Ice Arena in 1992.

Aberdeen Lynx plays in the Scottish National League and is based at the Linx Ice Arena. Founded in 2005, they won back to back regular season titles in 2022-23 and 2023–24 and won the play-off championship in 2015-16 and again in 2024–25. They regularly sell out home games and are the second best supported sports team in the city after Aberdeen FC.

=== Other sports ===
The City of Aberdeen Swim Team (COAST) was based in Northfield swimming pool, but since the opening of the Aberdeen Aquatics Centre in 2014, it is now based there, as it has a 50 m pool as opposed to the 25 m pool at Northfield. It has been in operation since 1996. The team comprises several smaller swimming clubs and has enjoyed success throughout Scotland and in international competitions. Three of the team's swimmers qualified for the 2006 Commonwealth Games. There are four boat clubs that row on the River Dee: Aberdeen Boat Club (ABC), Aberdeen Schools Rowing Association (ASRA), Aberdeen University Boat Club (AUBC) and Robert Gordon University Boat Club (RGUBC).

The city has one national league side, Stoneywood-Dyce. Local "Grades" cricket has been played in Aberdeen since 1884. Aberdeenshire were the 2009 and 2014 Scottish National Premier League and Scottish Cup Champions. Aberdeen University Shinty Club (Scottish Gaelic: Club Camanachd Oilthigh Obar Dheathain) is the oldest constituted shinty club in the world, dating back to 1861.

The city council operates public tennis courts in various parks including an indoor tennis centre at Westburn Park. The Beach Leisure Centre is home to a climbing wall, gymnasium and a swimming pool. There are numerous swimming pools dotted around the city notably the largest, the Bon Accord Baths which closed down in 2008. In common with many other major towns and cities in the UK, Aberdeen has an active roller derby league, Granite City Roller Derby.

The Aberdeen Roughnecks American football club is a new team that started in 2012 and is the first team that Aberdeen has witnessed since the Granite City Oilers that began in 1986 and were wound up in the mid-1990s. Aberdeen Oilers Floorball Club was founded in 2007. The club initially attracted a range of experienced Scandinavian and other European players who were studying in Aberdeen. Since their formation, Aberdeen Oilers have played in the British Floorball Northern League and went on to win the league in the 2008/09 season. The club played a major role in setting up a ladies league in Scotland. The Oilers' ladies team ended up second in the first ladies league season (2008/09).

== Accidents and disasters ==
One of the earliest known disasters is the Storegga Slide in the mesolithic period in 6225–6170 BCE which caused tsunami waves to hit North sea coastal areas, with wave heights of 3-6 meters in the north east Scotland areas.

In the early modern period, disasters include a sack of Aberdeen by Royalists in 1644 during the Battle of Aberdeen, where 118–160 people were killed, an outbreak of bubonic plague in 1647 causing the death of a quarter of the population and famine in the 1690s, during the Seven Ill Years, where up to 25% of the population in Aberdeenshire died from starvation.

In the 19th century, maritime accidents and disasters were prominent, such as in 1813, when the whaling ship Oscar wrecked near Aberdeen, with the loss of 40-45 lives and the Moray Firth fishing disaster in 1848 when a storm struck the east coast of Scotland causing the death of 100 fishermen from the east coast harbours. In 1876, the River Dee ferryboat disaster took place when 32 people drowned in the mouth of the River Dee. The 20th century includes a World War II disaster when in 1943, a Luftwaffe raid dropped 129 bombs on Aberdeen resulting in 125 deaths. In 1964, a typhoid outbreak occurred with 400 cases and three fatalities. In 1983, the Aberdeen taxi driver George Murdoch was killed, the murder case is unsolved.

In modern time, accidents have been related with offshore drilling. In 1988, the oil platform Piper Alpha, located 190 km north-east of Aberdeen, exploded and collapsed, killing 165. The accident is the worst ever offshore oil and gas disaster in terms of lives lost. Hazlehead Park contains a memorial to the crew. In 1995, Bristow Helicopters Flight 56C was struck by lightning and emergency landed in the sea. The 18 crew and passengers on board survived. In 2009, the Bond Offshore Helicopters Flight 85N crashed 20 km north-east of Peterhead, while returning from an oil platform to Aberdeen Airport. All 16 on board died. Johnston Gardens contains a memorial to the deceased.

== Twin cities ==
Aberdeen is twinned with

- Stavanger, Norway, since 1990
- Regensburg, Germany, since 1955
- Clermont-Ferrand, France, since 1983
- Bulawayo, Zimbabwe, since 1986
- Houston, Texas, US, since 1979, is twinned with the former region of Grampian of which Aberdeen is the regional centre
- Kobe, Japan, since 2022, is twinned with Aberdeen for its hydrogen work.
- Barranquilla, Colombia

== Notable people and residents ==
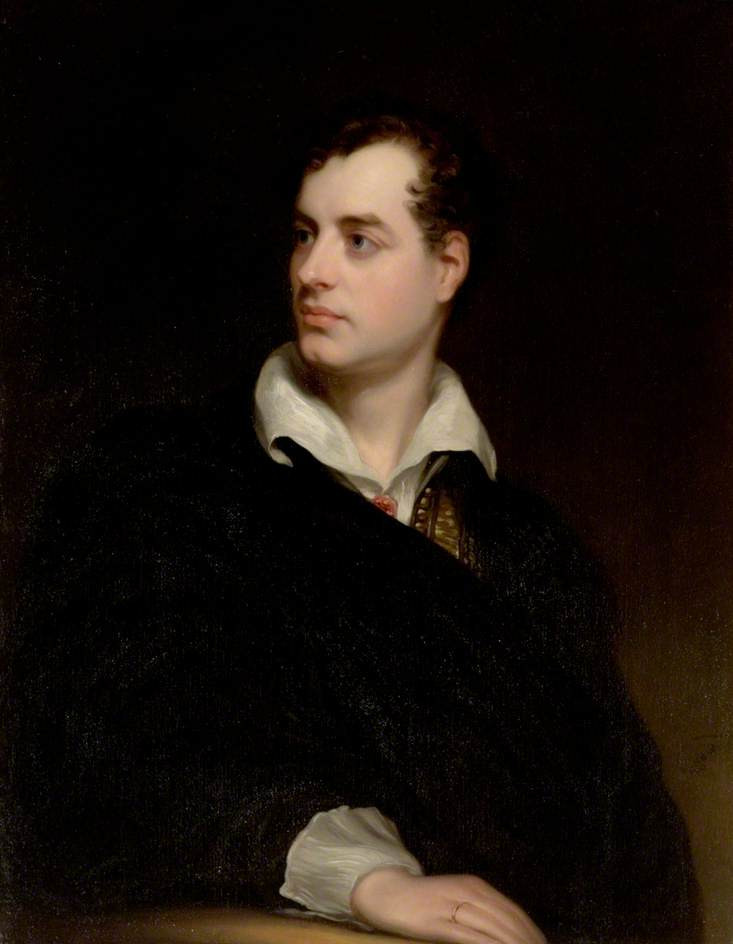
Portrait of Lord Byron by Thomas Phillips, c. 1814

- William Alexander (1826–1894), journalist and author of Johnny Gibb of Gushetneuk.
- Leslie Benzies (born 1971), Former president of Rockstar North, creators of the critically acclaimed Grand Theft Auto series.
- Scott Booth (born 1971), former football player, played for Aberdeen F.C., FC Twente, Borussia Dortmund and the Scotland national football team.
- Alf Burnett (1922–1977), footballer who played for Dundee United
- Lord Byron (1788–1824), poet, was raised (age 2–10) in Aberdeen.
- Alexander Milne Calder (1846–1923), sculptor
- Andrew Cant (1584–1663), Presbyterian minister and leader of the Scottish Covenanters
- David Carry (born 1981), swimmer, two times 2006 Commonwealth Games gold medallist.
- Henry Cecil (1943–2013), one of the most successful horse trainers of all time.
- Oswald Chambers (1874–1917), author of My Utmost for His Highest
- Alexander Christie (1901–1946), portrait painter.
- Dan Crenshaw, Member of the U.S. House of Representatives from Texas's 2nd district.
- Andrew Cruickshank, actor famous for his role in Dr Finlay's Casebook
- John Mathieson Dodds, apprentice and engineer with Metrovick, Manchester and radar pioneer in Chain Home defence system for 1940 Battle of Britain.
- Neil Fachie, cyclist, 2012 Paralympic Games gold and silver medalist.
- Simon Farquhar, playwright.
- Graeme Garden, author, actor, comedian, artist, TV presenter, famous for The Goodies.
- Martin Gatt, principal bassoonist English Chamber Orchestra, LPO and LSO.
- Ryan Gauld, footballer who currently plays for Vancouver Whitecaps in the MLS.
- James Gibbs, 18th-century architect.
- Quentin Gibson (1918–2011), physiologist and biochemist
- James Gregory (1638–1675), Scottish mathematician and astronomer, born in the manse at Drumoak, just outside Aberdeen. Attended Aberdeen Grammar School and Marischal College, University of Aberdeen. Discovered diffraction gratings a year after Newton's prism experiments, and invented the Gregorian telescope design in 1663 which is used in telescopes such as the Arecibo Observatory.
- David Gregory (1659–1708), Scottish mathematician and astronomer. Attended Aberdeen Grammar School and Marischal College, University of Aberdeen. A professor of mathematics. Based on his uncle James Gregory's work, he extended or discovered the method of quadratures by infinite series. His principle work "Astronomiae physicae et geometricae elementa" (1702) was the first text-book on gravitational principles.
- Herbert Grierson (1866-1960), was professor of English Literature at the University of Aberdeen, where he taught from 1894 to 1915.
- Michael Gove, former MP and Secretary of State, current member of the House of Lords as Lord Gove of Torry.
- John Henderson, professional darts player
- George Jamesone, Scotland's first eminent portrait-painter.
- Reginald Victor Jones, physicist, Chair of Natural Philosophy at the University of Aberdeen, author.
- John Michael Kosterlitz, physicist, professor of physics at Brown University. Awarded the Nobel Prize in physics in 2016.
- Denis Law (1940-2025), football player, played for Huddersfield Town, Manchester City, Torino, Manchester United and the Scotland national team, joint all-time record Scotland goalscorer with 30 goals.
- Paul Lawrie, golfer, winner of the 1999 Open Championship.
- Annie Lennox, musician, winner of eight Brit Awards.
- Rose Leslie, actress, best known for playing Ygritte in HBO's Game of Thrones.
- Kim Little, footballer who won the Champions League with Arsenal and was vice-captain for Scotland
- John Macleod (1876–1935) Biochemist and Physiologist. For his role in the discovery and isolation of insulin he was awarded the Nobel Prize for Physiology or Medicine in 1923.
- John Alexander MacWilliam (1857–1937), Professor of the Institutes of Medicine (later Physiology) at the University of Aberdeen. Pioneer in the field of cardiac electro-physiology & ventricular fibrillation of the heart. First to propose ventricular fibrillation as the most common cause of sudden death through heart attack. First to propose use of life saving electrical de-fibrilators. His work laid the frame work for the development of the pace maker.
- Laura Main, actress, best known for playing Sister Bernadette/Shelagh Turner in the BBC's Call the Midwife
- James Clerk Maxwell (1831–1879), Chair of Natural Philosophy at Marischal College, University of Aberdeen from 1856 to 1860. Formulated the classical theory of electromagnetic radiation.
- Robert Morison (1620–1683), a Scottish botanist and taxonomist. He elucidated and developed the first systematic classification of plants. Gained his Master of Arts from the University of Aberdeen at the age of eighteen. For ten years Director of Louis XIV's royal gardens at Blois, France, then physician, botanist & superintendent of all royal gardens for Charles II of Scotland.
- Alberto Morrocco (1917–1998), Scottish artist and teacher famous for his landscapes of Scotland and abroad.
- Andy Nisbet (1953–2019), a Scottish mountaineer, guide, climbing instructor, and editor of climbing guidebooks. A pioneer of mixed rock and ice climbing techniques over 45 years. Developed over 1,000 new winter climbing routes in Scotland.
- Ara Paiaya, film producer and director of Skin Traffik, Instant Death and Purge of Kingdoms.
- Robbie Renwick, swimmer, 1x 2010 Commonwealth Games gold medalist.
- Professor Sir C. Duncan Rice, historian, former principal of the University of Aberdeen.
- Lawson Robertson (1883–1951), born in Aberdeen, competed for the U.S. Olympic Team at the 1904 Olympics in St. Louis, winning the bronze medal in the standing high jump. Head coach of U.S. track team at 4 successive Olympic games, 1924, 1928, 1932, 1936.
- Nan Shepherd (1893-1981), Scottish Renaissance author, who taught at Aberdeen College of Education, formerly Aberdeen Training Centre, until 1956
- Archibald Simpson, architect, one of Aberdeen's major architects.
- John Smith, architect, Aberdeen's other major architect and official City Architect
- Nicol Stephen, former Scottish Liberal Democrats leader, former Deputy First Minister of Scotland
- John Strachan, first Anglican Bishop of Toronto.
- Andrew Tait (c. 1710–1778) a Scottish organist, composer, church musician, and music educator
- Annie Wallace, actress in Hollyoaks.
- Ron Yeats (1937-2024), former football player, captain of the first great Liverpool team of the 1960s, also played for the Scotland national team.

== Aberdeen in popular culture ==
- Stuart MacBride's crime novels Cold Granite, Dying Light, Broken Skin, Flesh House, Blind Eye and Dark Blood (a series with main protagonist, DS Logan McRae) are all set in Aberdeen.
- A large part of the plot of the World War II thriller Eye of the Needle by Welsh author, Ken Follett, takes place in wartime Aberdeen, from which a German spy is trying to escape to a submarine waiting offshore.
- A portion of Ian Rankin's novel Black and Blue (1997) is set in Aberdeen, where its nickname "Furry Boots" is noted.
- Songs including "Aberdeen" in the title have been recorded by the music groups Danny Wilson, Royseven, Cage the Elephant, and The Xcerts.
- The character Scotty from Star Trek: The Original Series references spending his youth in Aberdeen, though it is debated whether it is his birthplace.

== See also ==
- Aberdeen Bestiary
- Aberdeen typhoid outbreak 1964
- List of places in Aberdeen
- Our Lady of Aberdeen
- Freedom of the City of Aberdeen
- Grampian Television
- STV North
