= Transport in Aberdeen =

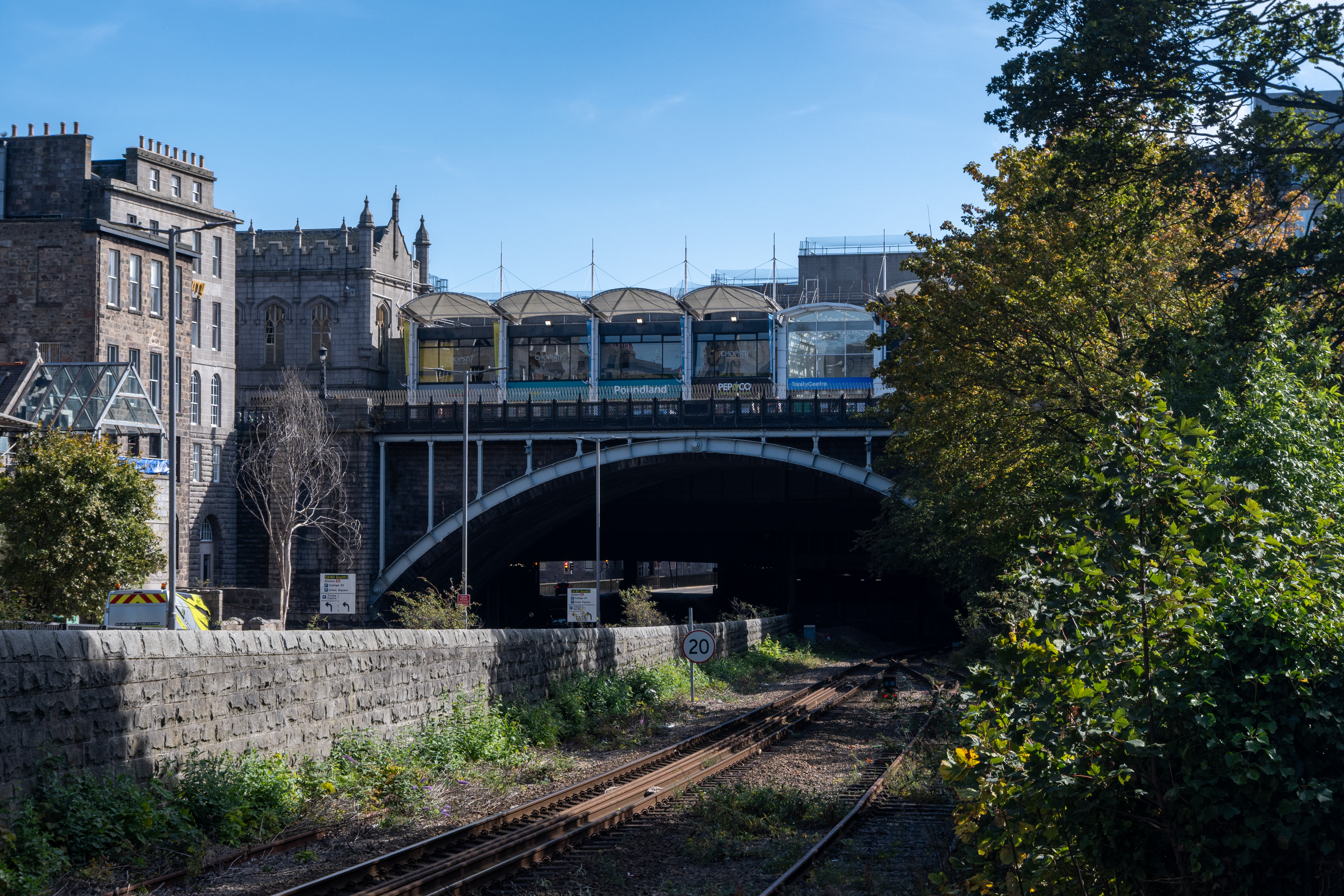
Union Bridge with the Denburn Road and the Aberdeen–Inverness line passing underneath

The network of transportation in Aberdeen is extensive and diversified, like that of many comparably sized cities.

As an ancient city, Aberdeen maintains historic infrastructure features such as the Brig o' Balgownie and the Bridge of Dee. The advent of cars since has seen the creation of higher-capacity, modern infrastructure such as the Anderson Drive dual carriageway and the Haudagain Roundabout.

== Airport and heliport ==
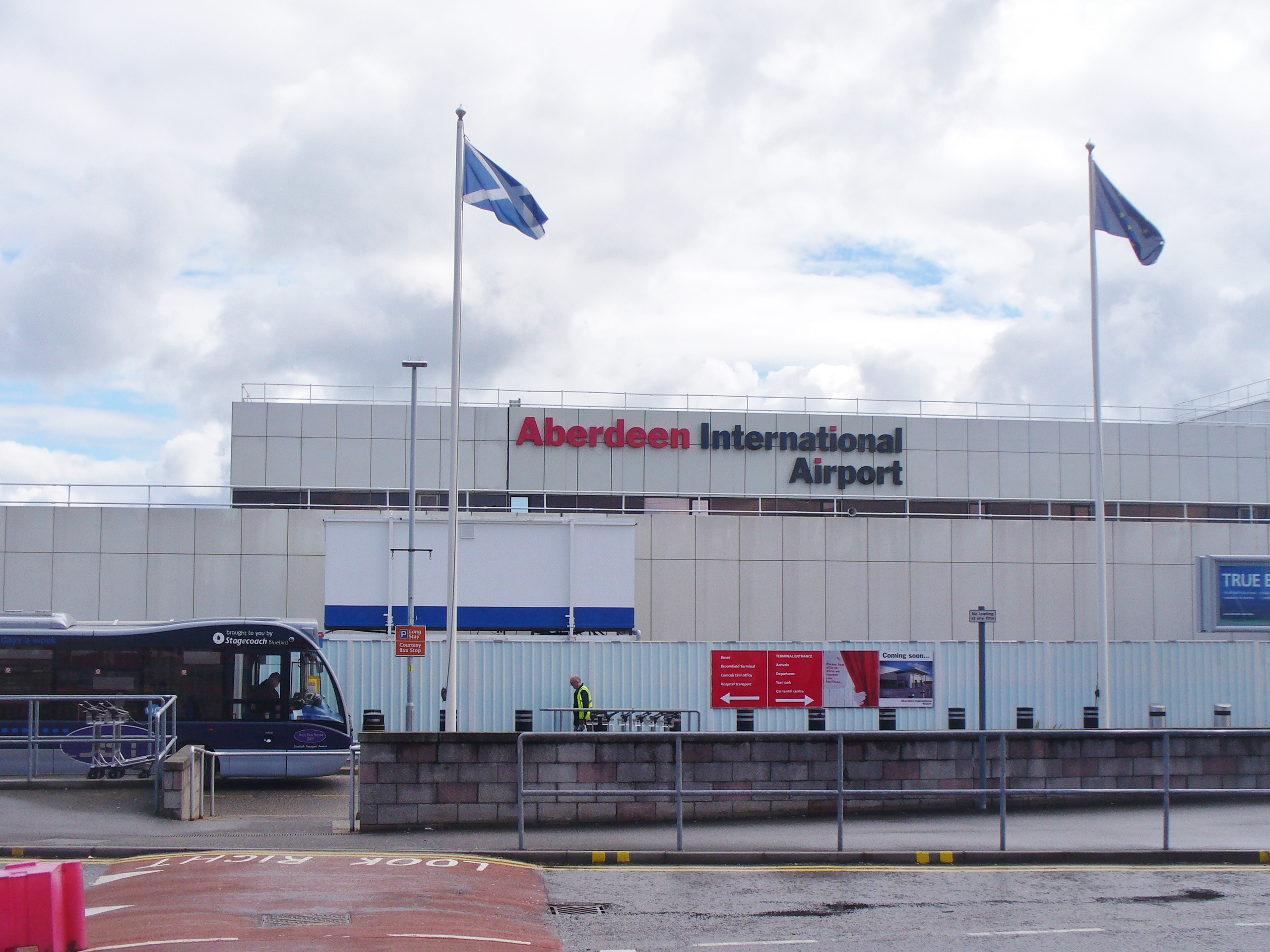
Aberdeen Airport terminal building

Aberdeen Airport, in the neighbouring town of Dyce, serves primarily UK and European destinations for passenger and freight flights. It is also the busiest helicopter terminal in the world, serving the many North Sea oil offshore installations. Via commercial airlines, connections are available via London Heathrow and Amsterdam airports to many worldwide destinations. The IATA airport code for the airport is ABZ. A regular airport bus service (route 727 operated by Stagecoach Bluebird) connects the airport directly with the city centre at Broad Street and the bus and railway stations at Union Square.

== Railway ==
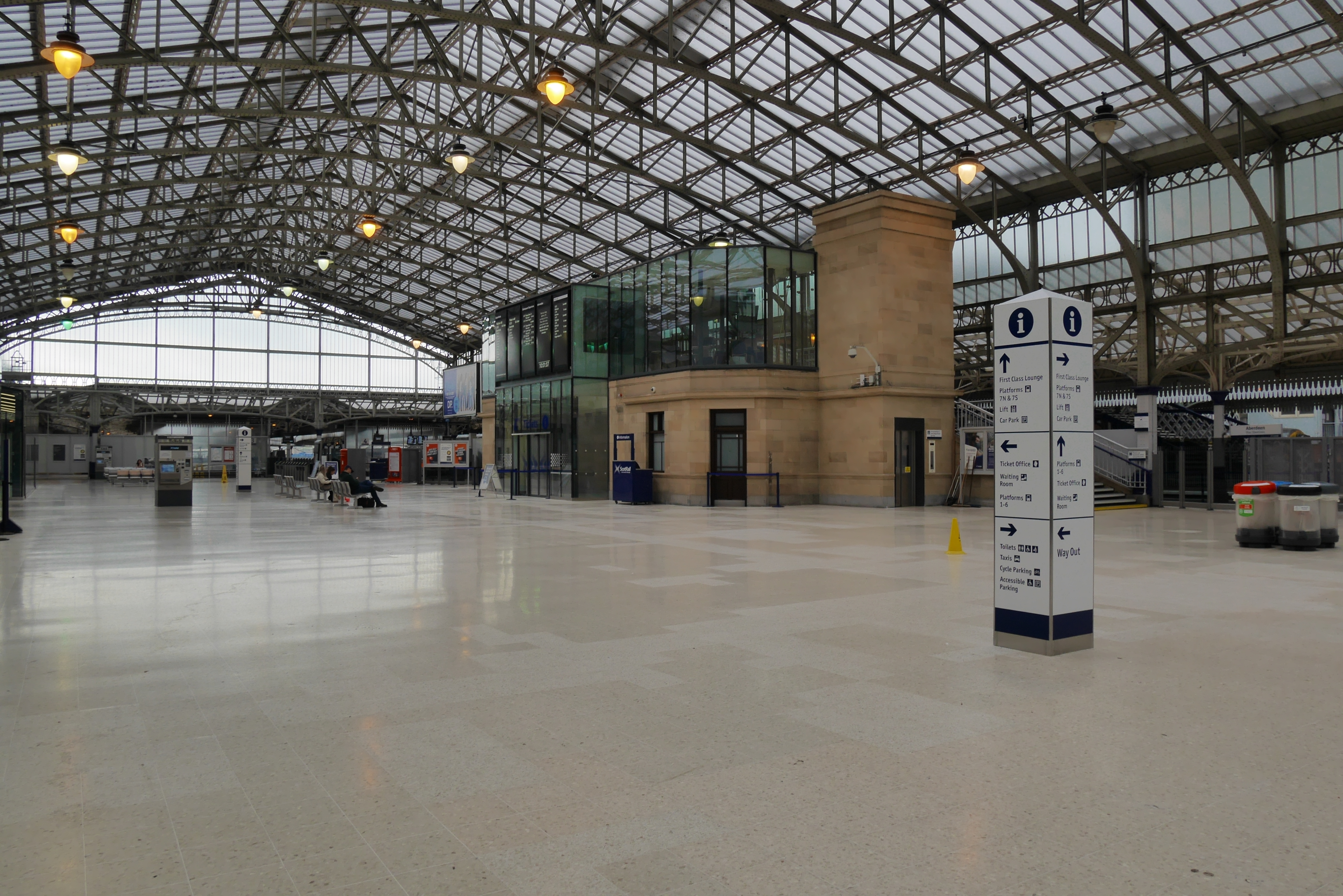
Aberdeen Station concourse in 2022

=== Historical ===
Aberdeen was connected to the railway network from the south with the opening of Aberdeen Ferryhill railway station in 1850. Three years later, the Deeside Railway opened and the following year the railway was extended to Guild Street. From the north, the Great North of Scotland Railway opened its terminus at Kittybrewster in 1854. A new terminus, Aberdeen Waterloo, opened two years later. The two railways weren't connected until 1867 when the Joint station opened at the site of the present day Aberdeen railway station.

Aberdeen formerly had a suburban rail service affectionately known as the "subbie" which operated between Culter and Dyce. The service to Dyce began on 1 July 1887 and the service to Culter began seven years later. These services were withdrawn on 3 April 1937.

As with many parts of the UK rail network, several lines out of Aberdeen were closed in the 1960s. For example, the Deeside Railway which ran west of the city to Ballater opened in 1853 but the Beeching Report led to the closure of the line in 1966. The line is now a popular walk and cycle route, the Deeside Way. Further lines running north to the commuter town of Ellon and to Peterhead were also closed around this time.

=== Present day ===
There are two railway stations in Aberdeen. The main city-centre station is located on Guild Street, adjacent to Union Square which offers a covered interchange with the bus station. The only other station in Aberdeen City is Dyce to the north.

ScotRail services connect Aberdeen to six of the seven other Scottish cities, including Edinburgh and Glasgow, and many intermediate destinations. These services make use of the Dundee–Aberdeen line and Aberdeen–Inverness line. There are no direct train services between Aberdeen and Dunfermline. High-speed inter-city services operated by London North Eastern Railway connect Aberdeen to London via Edinburgh in just over seven hours on the East Coast Main Line. A regular stopping service, also run by ScotRail, serves Aberdeen along with all stations between Inverurie and Montrose. Inter-city services operated by CrossCountry connect Aberdeen to south-west England and numerous intermediate destinations such as Sheffield, Birmingham, Bristol and Exeter. In addition, the Caledonian Sleeper service makes an overnight journey to/from London Euston six days a week.

== Buses ==
=== Historical ===
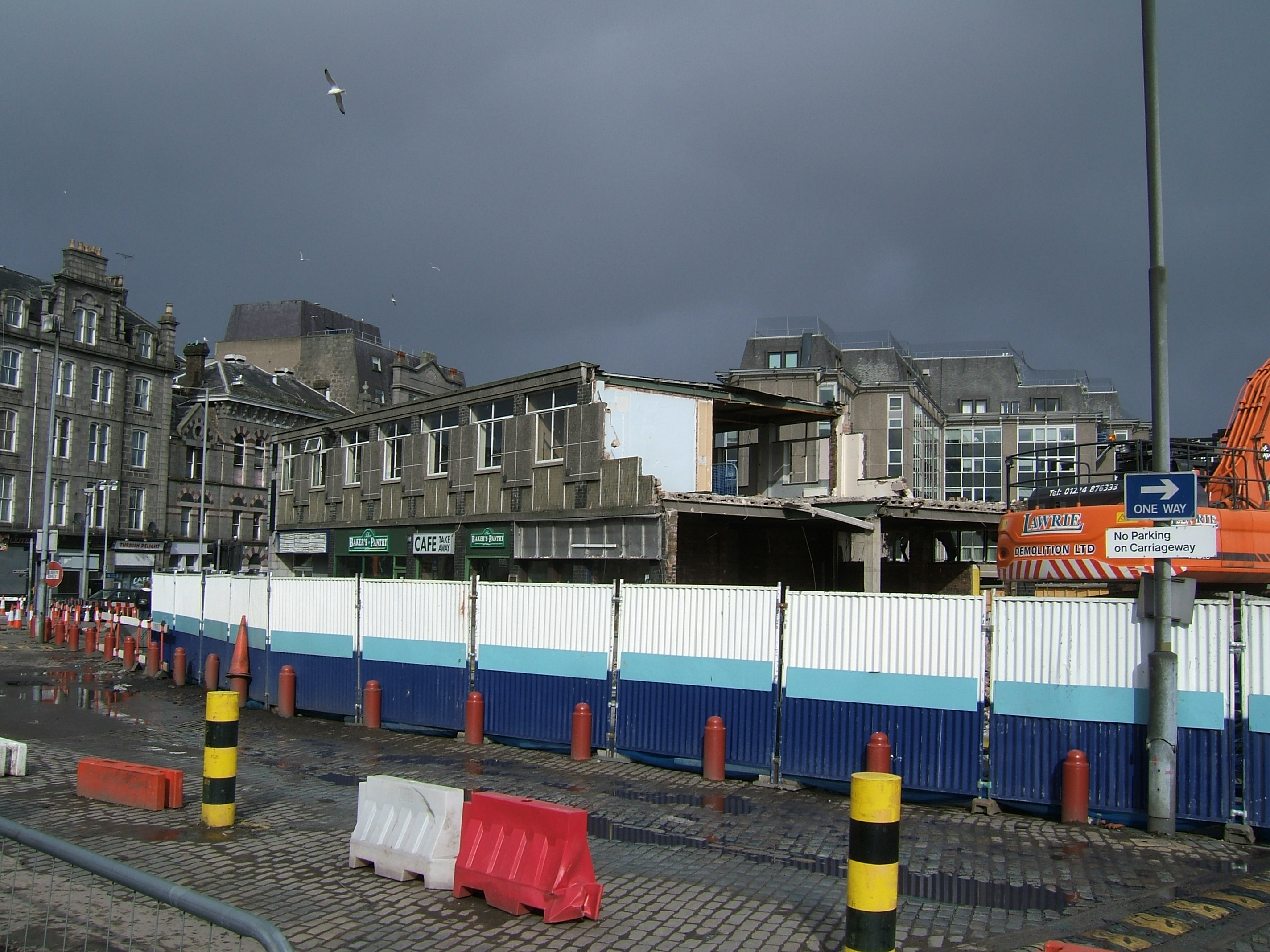
The former bus station being demolished

Bus services form the main public transportation system in Aberdeen since the closure of the tram network. Most city buses are operated privately by FirstGroup via their subsidiary First Aberdeen (First's global headquarters are located in the city, on King Street). When bus services in the UK were privatised in the 1980s, those in Aberdeen were the subject of a management buy-out. The resulting company developed into FirstGroup following a number of mergers and acquisitions over the years. First Aberdeen has been criticised by local politicians and in the media for taking advantage of its monopoly with high fares and mediocre service. The company has defended its frequent fare rises as being necessary due to high running costs and cuts to government subsidies.

There was formerly a limited night bus service, the night bus network having been cut back in October 2018. Night buses were discontinued during the COVID-19 pandemic. Night buses were reintroduced in December 2022.

==== Former routes ====
No.	Start	End	Withdrawn	Notes
8	Dubford	Aberdeen Royal Infirmary	December 2022	Withdrawal proposed in 2019.
15	Beach Retail Park	Airyhall or Craigiebuckler	July 2022	Via Footdee. On withdrawal, the Airyhall to Union Street portion was replaced by the new route 15 while Craigiebuckler was taken over by new route 11A. Footdee was left with no service.
X27	Guild Street	Dyce railway station	December 2022	Via Aberdeen Airport. Introduced in 2019.

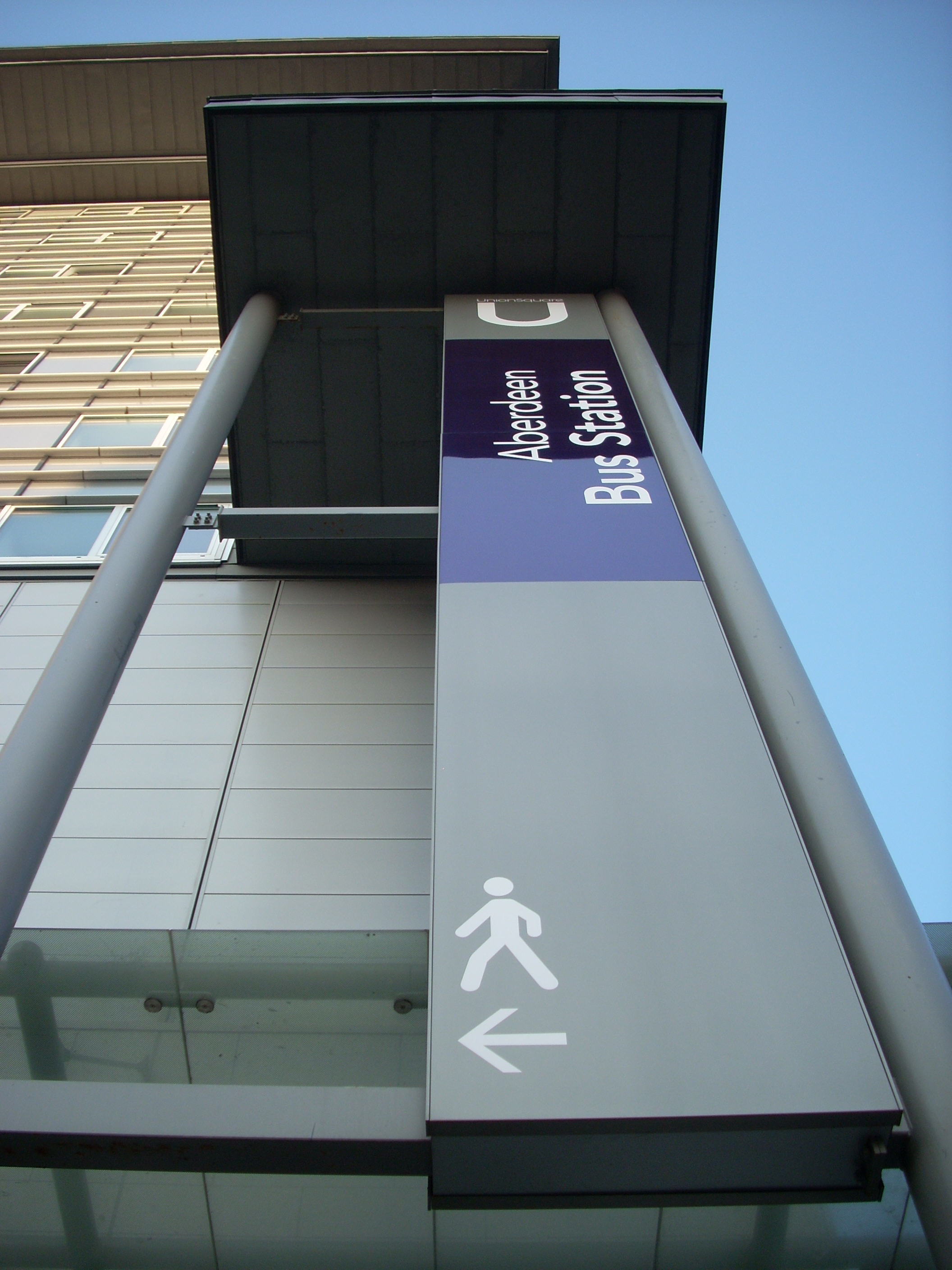
Sign at Aberdeen bus station, Union Square

=== Present day ===
First Aberdeen have the largest share of routes in the city. They operate a hub-and-spoke network - the majority of routes begin at an outskirt or suburb, run through the city centre (often via at least part of Union Street) and then out to another suburb. For example, route 1 runs from Danestone in the north, to the city centre along Union Street, then out to Garthdee in the south-west. Services run at intervals from approximately every 15 minutes (during the day) to every 30 minutes (in the evening and on Sundays). Many of the routes date back to those formerly operated by trams. When the tram system was closed in the 1950s, the same routes were replaced by diesel buses. Many of these same routes, with minor alterations, still run today. Stagecoach Bluebird also operates two cross-city routes; their route 59 operates between Northfield and Balnagask via the city centre and Aberdeen Royal Infirmary & route 727 which operates between Aberdeen Bus Station and Aberdeen Airport.

Aberdeen bus station is the terminus for Stagecoach services to outlying villages and towns. Services include the Jet 727, a frequent service linking the bus station at Union Square to Aberdeen Airport, the X7 Coastrider, and the Buchan Express. The city is the northern terminus of the X7 which runs to Dundee via many towns along the route. These services and other Stagecoach buses that start at the bus station also pick up and drop off passengers within the city itself.

Longer-distance and inter-city buses also operate from several places in the City centre, such as the bus station at Union Square or nearby Union Street. Frequent services to other Scottish cities are operated by Scottish Citylink, Ember and FlixBus. Local companies often assist on Scottish Citylink routes. For example, Central Coaches (Aberdeen) can often be seen running the M92 route from Aberdeen to Edinburgh.

A night service from Aberdeen bus station to surrounding settlements was reintroduced for December 2022 and will run on Friday and Saturday nights up to Christmas. The services, operated by Stagecoach, are funded by Aberdeen City Council and Aberdeen Inspired and are free of charge. Night Buses then returned again in 2024 and 2025, being operated by both First Bus and Stagecoach Bluebird.

In 2023, multiple bus gates were installed in the city centre. These resulted in improved reliability of bus service and reductions in journey time. A trial of free bus services during weekends took place funded by operational savings resulting from the bus gates.

==== Current intracity routes ====
All current intracity routes apart from the 9U and 32 operate via Union Street. All routes are operated by First Aberdeen apart from the 14, 59 and 727.

No.	Start	End	Notes
1	Danestone	Garthdee	Further information: First Aberdeen bus routes 1 and 2
1B	Dubford or Bridge of Don Park and Ride	Garthdee	Further information: First Aberdeen bus routes 1 and 2
2	Ashwood Park	Garthdee	Further information: First Aberdeen bus routes 1 and 2
3	Mastrick	Cove Bay	Branded “Thistle Line” until the introduction of new vehicles on the line, causing the branding to be lost.
9U	Hillhead of Seaton	Aberdeen Royal Infirmary	Exclusive to University of Aberdeen students, staff, and visitors. Travels directly between Hillhead, Sir Duncan Rice Library, and Aberdeen Royal Infirmary.
11	Woodend or Craigiebuckler	Northfield	Route 11A was introduced in July 2022 to serve Craigiebuckler. The two routes split at Anderson Drive.
12	Heathryford	Torry	
13	Scatterburn	Seaton or Hillhead of Seaton (evenings and weekends)	
14	Bridge Street	Kingswells	Operated by McGills since November 2024. Previously service X14 operated by Stagecoach Bluebird.
15	Countesswells	Balnagask	Introduced in July 2022.
17	Dyce Shopping Centre or Bucksburn	Faulds Gate	Branded “Northern Lights” until the introduction of new vehicles on the line, causing the branding to be lost onboard all vehicles except one. Following the withdrawal of route X27 in December 2022, route 17K was introduced at peak times to serve Kirklees Industrial Estate. Service N17 & N18 were also introduced in 2025.
18	Dyce Shopping Centre	Redmoss	Branded “Northern Lights” until the introduction of new vehicles on the line, causing the branding to be lost onboard all vehicles except one. Following the withdrawal of route X27 in December 2022, route 17K was introduced at peak times to serve Kirklees Industrial Estate. Service N17 & N18 were also introduced in 2025.
19	Tillydrone	Peterculter	Operated by the world's first hydrogen double deckers from January 2021.
20	Hillhead of Seaton	Union Terrace	Formerly operated to Tillydrone but was cut back to Old Aberdeen in the 1960s, and subsequently extended from Old Aberdeen to Hillhead of Seaton. The southern terminus was formerly Marischal College. The route was extended to Balnagask to take over part of the former route 5, which was withdrawn. From 3 July 2022, the route was cut back to Union Street with the portion to Balnagask now operated by route 15.
23	Heathryford	Sheddocksley	Branded “Sunshine Line” until the introduction of new vehicles on the line, causing the branding to be lost. Service N23 was introduced in 2025 linking Aberdeen with Kingswells.
32	Dubford	Oldmachar Academy	Runs once each way per day. Introduced in December 2022 following the withdrawal of route 8.
59	Northfield	Balnagask	Operated by hybrid buses from 2012 to 2022. Operated by fully electric vehicles from 2022.
727	Aberdeen bus station	Aberdeen Airport	24 hour service. Operated by fully electric double deckers from 2022.

=== Hydrogen buses ===
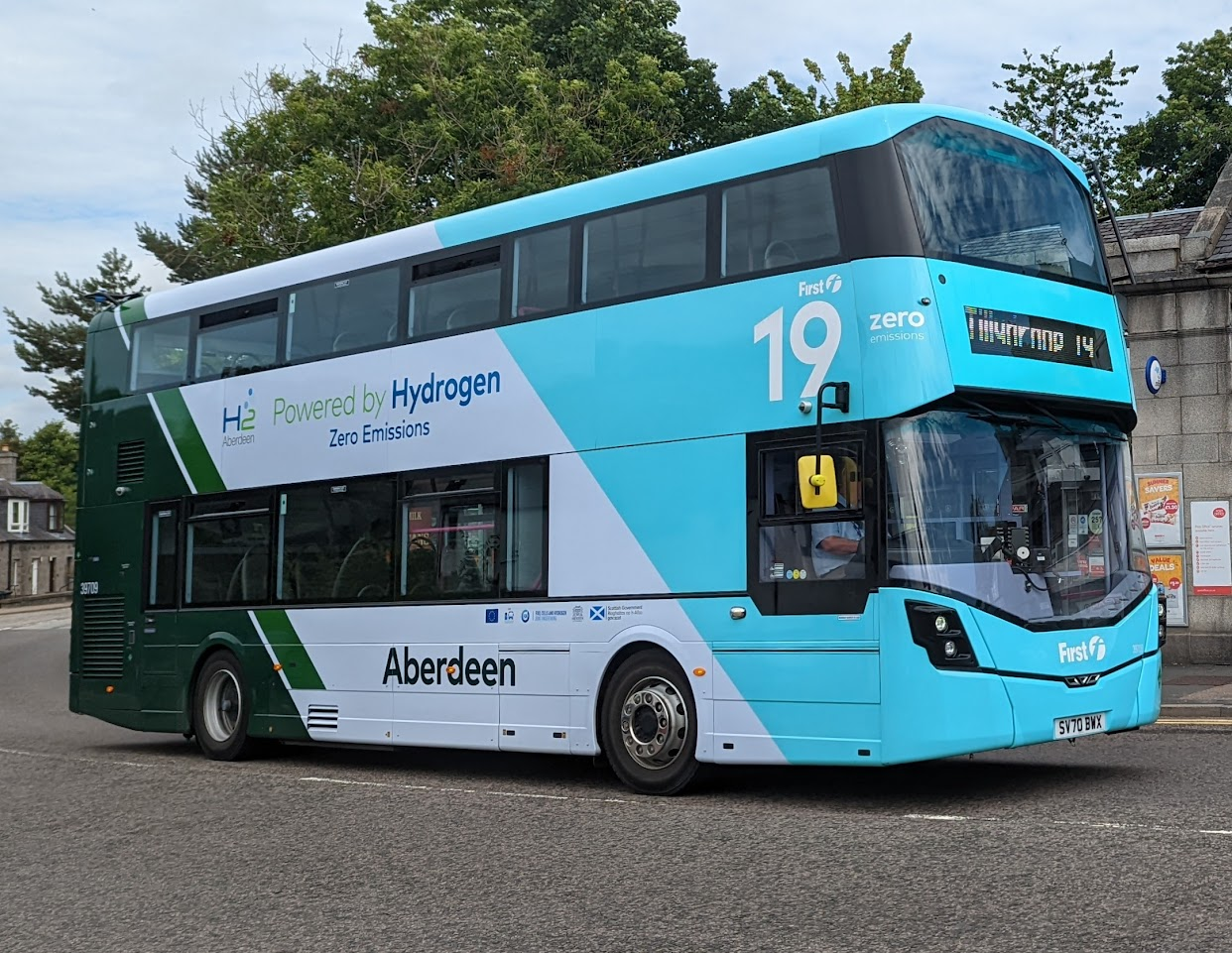
Wright StreetDeck Hydroliner in Peterculter in July 2022

Ten Van Hool A330H hydrogen-powered buses were introduced in 2015 as part of a scheme to demonstrate the capabilities of the technology. They ran until 2020, and one was subsequently gifted to the Grampian Transport Museum. On 28 January 2021, fifteen hydrogen-powered double-decker Wright StreetDeck Hydroliner buses, funded by Aberdeen City Council, the Scottish Government, and the European Union, entered service with First Aberdeen. In February 2022, the StreetDeck Hydroliners were temporarily taken off the road due to an unspecified technical issue. Diesel buses loaned from First Glasgow were used in their place, and the affected batch of Hydroliners returned to service in mid-2022, coinciding with the delivery of 10 more StreetDeck Hydroliners.

The buses are refuelled at a facility located in Aberdeen City Council's Kittybrewster depot. The energy company Vattenfall announced, at the beginning of 2022, a proposed demonstrator project to use one of its existing offshore wind turbines to produce hydrogen on the platform itself, and then pipe it to a storage area close to Aberdeen. The production rate from the 8.8MW turbine is targeted to reach 0.18 cubic metres of hydrogen per hour.

=== Future ===
Improvements to buses in Aberdeen are planned as part of a project dubbed in January 2022 as "Aberdeen Rapid Transit". Initially anticipated to cost around £150 million, in June 2025 it was reported that the options being explored cost between £167 and £323 million.

== Roads ==
There are six main roads into and out of the city:

- The A92 runs north to the Blackdog interchange, where it joins the A90 for Ellon, Peterhead and Fraserburgh.
- The A947 exits the city at Dyce and goes on to Oldmeldrum and Turriff, ending at Banff.
- The A96 links to Elgin and Inverness in the north-west, passing through Inverurie, Huntly and Keith.
- The A944 exits the city to the west, passing through Westhill before following Donside to Alford, Strathdon and Corgarff.
- The A93 follows Deeside west to Banchory, Aboyne, Ballater and Braemar, then turns south, providing an alternative tourist route to Perth.
- The A92 south joins the A90 at Stonehaven, then continues as the coastal route by Inverbervie, Montrose and Arbroath to Dundee and on into Fife, whilst the A90 from Stonehaven provides the primary route to Dundee, Perth and Edinburgh.

The A90 Aberdeen Western Peripheral Route opened in stages during 2018 and 2019 and provides a bypass around the city from Blackdog in the north to Stonehaven in the south, diverting traffic away from the city centre and from the city's original ring road, Anderson Drive, built in the 1920s.

A low-emission zone came into force on 1 June 2024.

== Bridges ==
Aberdeen's two main rivers, the Dee and Don are currently crossed by a variety of bridges, varying from modern structures to older stone bridges dating back hundreds of years.

=== River Dee crossings ===
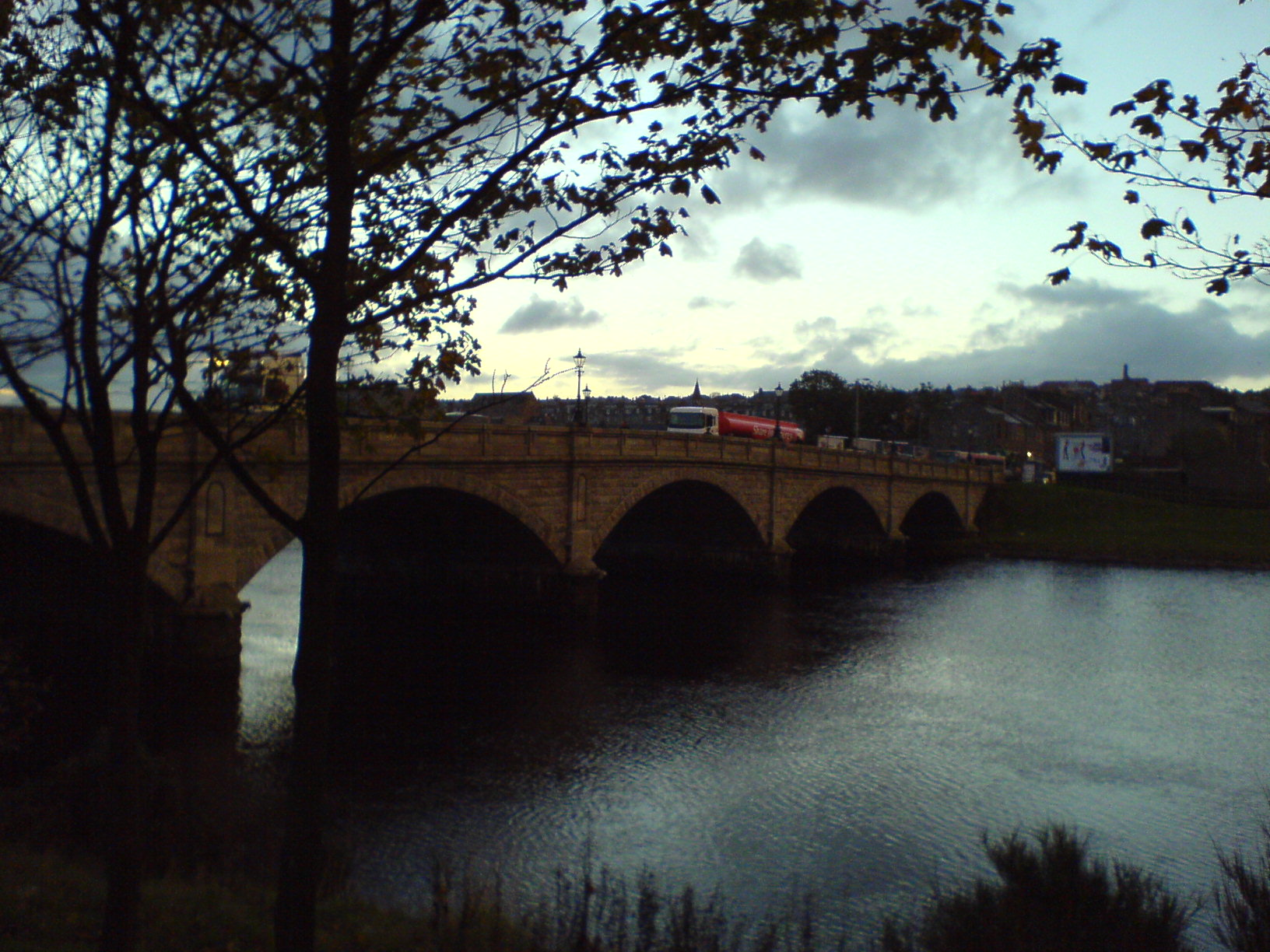
Victoria Bridge, Torry

The River Dee is crossed by a number of bridges, from east to west:

- Victoria Bridge
- Queen Elizabeth Bridge
- Wellington Suspension Bridge
- Ferryhill Railway Viaduct
- King George VI Bridge
- Bridge of Dee
- St Devenick's Bridge (disused)
- Aberdeen Western Peripheral Route bridge
- Maryculter Bridge

Maryculter Bridge links the North and South Deeside roads near the village of Maryculter close to the boundary of the council area, the bridge is earmarked for expansion as part of the proposed Aberdeen Western Peripheral Route to bypass the city.

Victoria Bridge was completed in 1887, following a ferry disaster in 1876 which claimed the lives of 32 people returning from a visit to the Bay of Nigg. It was made possible by the 1871 channelling of the River Dee which had previously followed an unstable course to the sea. The bridge has facilities for carrying water and gas services across the river.

Queen Elizabeth II Bridge opened in 1983.

Wellington Suspension Bridge is very narrow and was designed by Captain Samuel Brown and opened in 1831 to replace the Craiglug ferry. Refurbished in 1930, the Category A listed building was closed to vehicular traffic in 1984 and to pedestrians in March 2002 due to structural concerns. However it was refurbished and re-opened as a pedestrian bridge in 2008.

=== River Don crossings ===
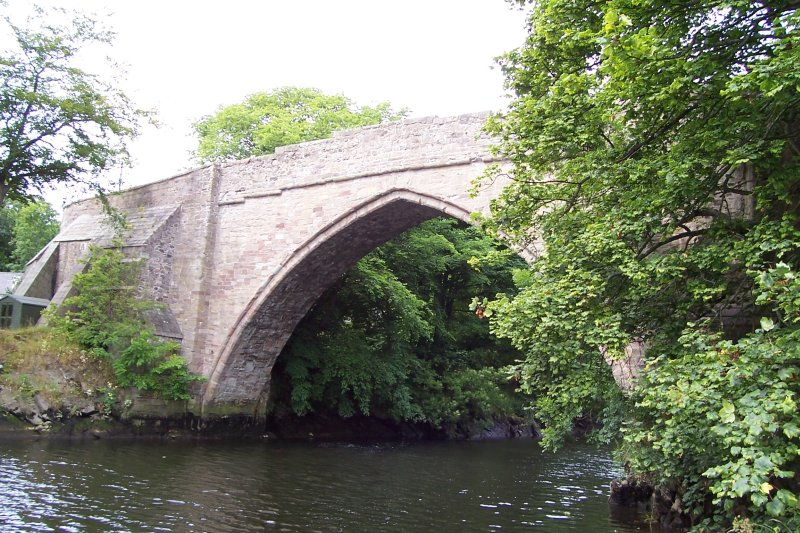
Brig o' Balgownie

The River Don is crossed by a number of bridges, from east to west:

- Bridge of Don
- Brig o' Balgownie
- Diamond Bridge
- Grandholm Bridge
- Persley Bridge

The Bridge of Don has five granite arches, each 75 ft (23 m) in span, and was built 1827–1832. A little to the west is the Auld Brig o' Balgownie, a picturesque single arch spanning the deep black stream, said to have been built by King Robert I, and celebrated by George Gordon Byron, 6th Baron Byron in the tenth canto of "Don Juan". It is closed to motor vehicles. The Grandholm Bridge is a private bridge, constructed for the Crombie Mills in the 1920s. Access to the bridge, other than for pedestrians and bicycles, is now controlled by an electronically activated barrier, passes for which are made available to residents of the housing development constructed on the site of the mills in 2004.

The A92 road uses Persley Bridge.

== Sea ==
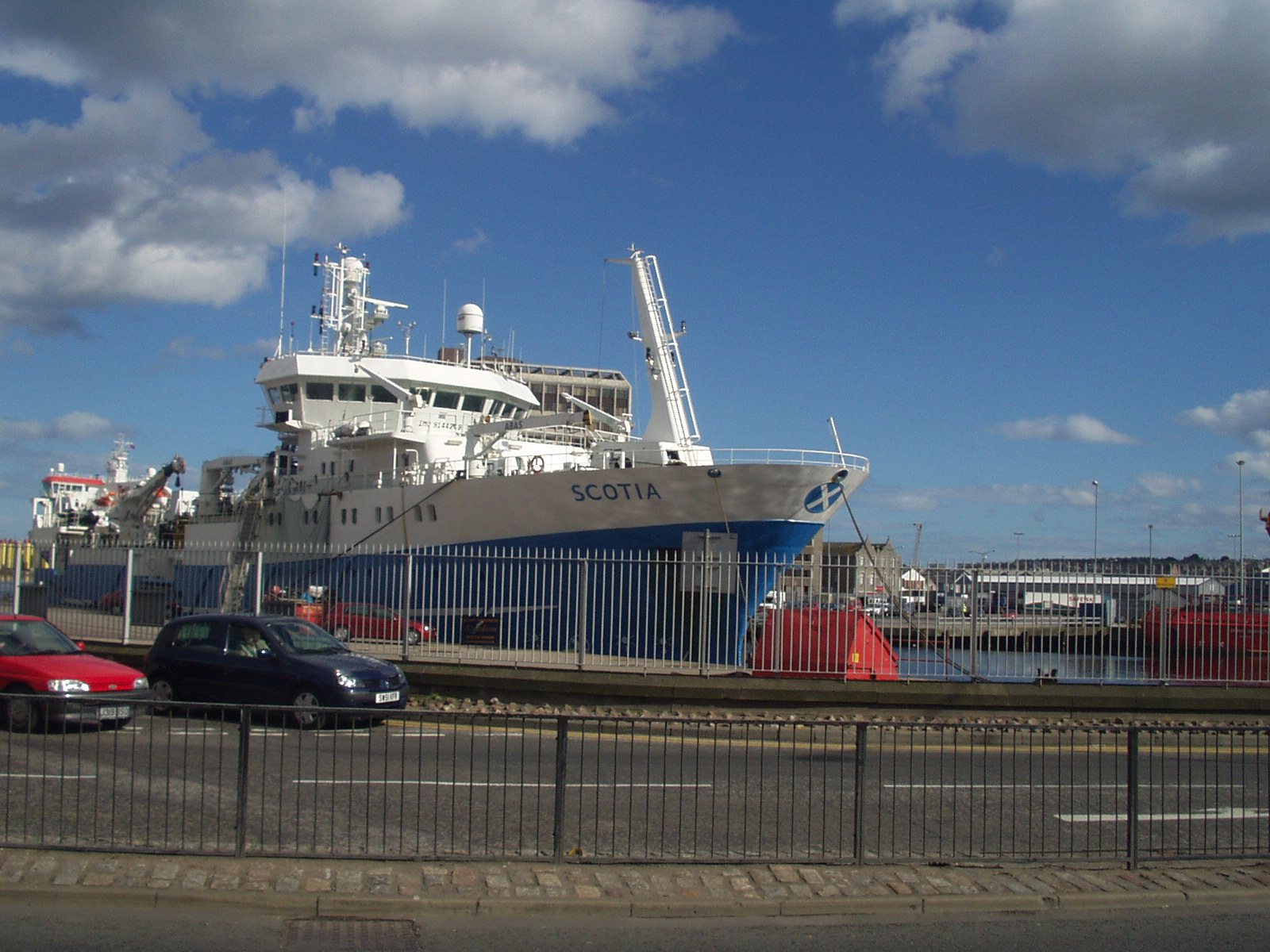
Fisheries Research Vessel Scotia in Aberdeen Harbour

Aberdeen Harbour was the first publicly limited company in the United Kingdom and is today the principal commercial port in northern Scotland and an international port for general cargo, roll-on/roll-off and container traffic. The harbour also serves NorthLink Ferries, which sail to Kirkwall, Orkney and Lerwick, Shetland. The Aberdeen Maritime Museum (on Shiprow in the city centre) includes exhibitions and displays which tell the story of the harbour and its role in the economy and development of the city.

Originally, the defective harbour, with a shallow sand and gravel bar at its entrance, retarded the trade of Aberdeen, but under various acts since 1773 it was greatly deepened.

By the Aberdeen Harbour Act 1868 (31 & 32 Vict. c. cxxxviii), the River Dee near the harbour was diverted from the south at a cost of £80,000, and 90 acres (364,000 m^{2}) of new ground, in addition to 25 acres (101,000 m^{2}) formerly made up, were provided on the north side of the river for the Albert Basin (with a graving dock), quays and warehouses. A 1,050 ft (320 m) long concrete breakwater was constructed on the south side of the stream as a protection against south-easterly gales. On Girdleness, the southern point of the bay, a lighthouse was built in 1833.

The North Pier, built partly by John Smeaton 1775–81, and partly by Thomas Telford 1810–15, extends nearly 3,000 ft (1000 m) into the North Sea and raised the bar.

Victoria Dock, named in honour of the queen's visit to the city in that year, is a wet dock of 29 acres (117,000 m^{2}) and with 6,000 ft (1,800 m) of quay, was completed in 1848

Upper Dock adjoins Victoria Dock.

=== Ferry services to the Northern Isles ===
NorthLink Ferries provides daily vehicle and foot-passenger service to Lerwick, Shetland, and regular service to Kirkwall, Orkney. On this route it operates two vessels, Hjaltland and Hrossey. These services arrive and depart at the ferry terminal which can be accessed off Market Street. The vessel can usually be clearly seen from the street when docked.

== Trams ==
The last tram ran on 3 May 1958. All but one were then scrapped; the last is on display in the Grampian Transport Museum at Alford, Aberdeenshire.

== Future ==
A new dual carriageway, the Berryden Corridor, is currently planned to be built within the city.

A project called Aberdeen Rapid Transit (ART) has been discussed. It aims to provide fast public transport along two routes, with dedicated bus lanes and vehicles with room for up to 150 passengers. Although it has been described as "tram like", the system is expected to use buses. In 2021, the scheme was successful in bidding for Transport Scotland's Bus Partnership Fund, and received £12 million of funding. The system is expected to cost from £167 million to £323 million.

== See also ==
- Causey Mounth
- Green Spaces and Walkways in Aberdeen
- Transport in Edinburgh
- Transport in Glasgow
- Transport in Scotland
