= Death of Eliza and Henrietta Huszti =

2025 missing persons case of two sisters in Aberdeen, Scotland

Eliza and Henrietta Huszti
- Born: 1992
- Disappeared: 7 January 2025; Aberdeen, Scotland
- Status: Deceased
- Died: c. 7 January 2025
- Cause of death: Drowning
- Body discovered: 31 January 2025

Eliza Huszti and Henrietta Huszti (1992 – c. 7 January 2025) were 32-year-old Hungarian sisters who disappeared in Aberdeen in the north east of Scotland on 7 January 2025. CCTV showed the sisters near the Queen Victoria Bridge in the early hours of 7 January, and their bodies were recovered from the River Dee nearby on 31 January.

== Personal background ==
Eliza and Henrietta Huszti were two sisters from a set of triplets. They were born in Hungary, but moved to Aberdeen, Scotland, around 2015. They lived in a flat in the city centre and were saving money to buy their own home. The sisters were described as "cautious women" by their brother József, and were said to have no financial difficulties. They were not known for going out and preferred to stay at home.

== Disappearance ==
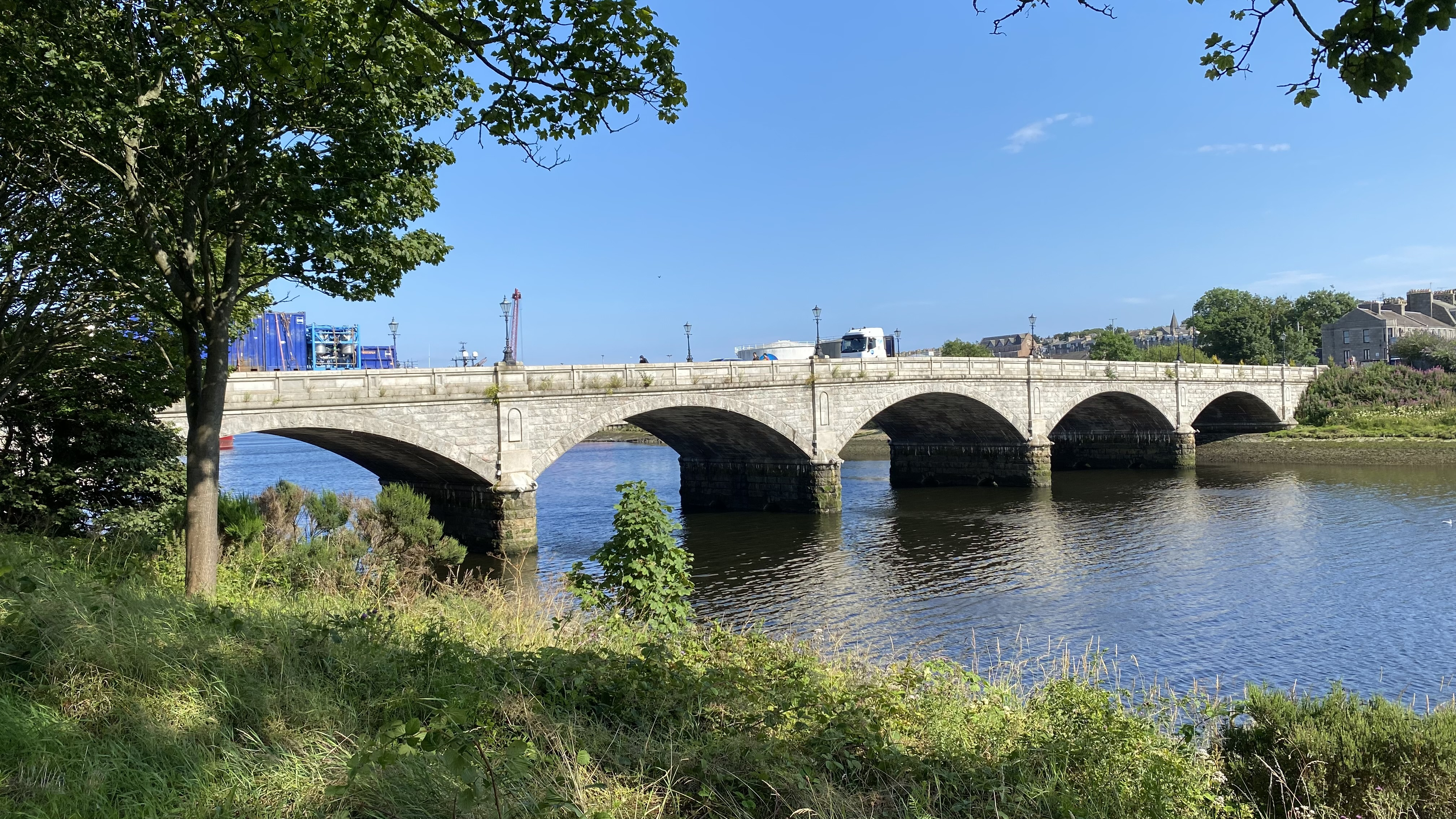
The Queen Victoria Bridge, near to where the sisters disappeared, pictured in 2023

At 02:12 GMT on 7 January 2025, a message was sent from Henrietta's phone to the sisters' landlady, stating that they would not return to the flat. The phone was in the Torry area of Aberdeen, in the vicinity of the Queen Victoria Bridge. It was then disconnected from the network. CCTV showed that the sisters crossed the bridge and entered a footpath beside the River Dee.

The landlady visited their address to discuss the termination of their tenancy, and raised the alarm of their disappearance. József stated that the family was not aware of the sisters' decision to end their tenancy, and described it as "strange" that they would not have been told. He also stated that the sisters were very close to their mother and would speak to her frequently, and that in a 40-minute phone conversation with her in the days prior to their disappearance nothing had seemed out of the ordinary.

== Investigation ==
Investigations found that the sisters had been at the bridge and footpath on 6 January; CCTV did not show them speaking to anybody. Police Scotland do not believe that their disappearance was linked to a criminal offence, and treated it as a missing persons inquiry. Investigators' hypotheses included the possibility that the sisters entered the river, and searches covered water, air, and land. Searches of Aberdeen Harbour and the Dee ended in late January, but coastal searches continued. Police Scotland were assisted by the Hungarian police force, who liaised with the family in Budapest.

On 31 January, the sisters' bodies were recovered from the Dee, one near the Queen Elizabeth Bridge and one near the Queen Victoria Bridge. In February 2025 the sisters' deaths were officially ruled to be caused by drowning and were not considered suspicious by authorities.

== See also ==
- List of solved missing person cases (2020s)
