= Wellington Suspension Bridge =

Suspension bridge in Aberdeen, Scotland

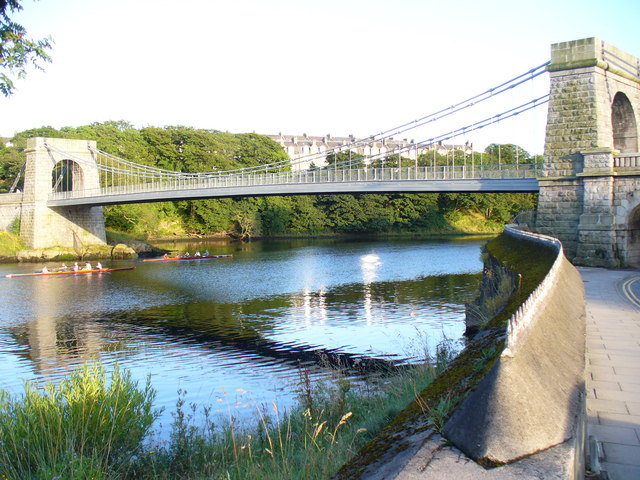
- The bridge crosses the river between Craiglug and Ferryhill
- Coordinates: 57.13558°N 2.09554°W
- OS grid reference: NJ 94316 04968
- Carries: 1
- Crosses: River Dee
- Locale: Aberdeen
- Preceded by: Ferryhill Railway Viaduct
- Followed by: Queen Elizabeth Bridge

History
- Opened: 1830

Listed Building – Category A
- Official name: Wellington Suspension Bridge Over River Dee, at Craiglug
- Designated: 12 January 1967
- Reference no.: LB20073

Location
- Interactive map of Wellington Suspension Bridge

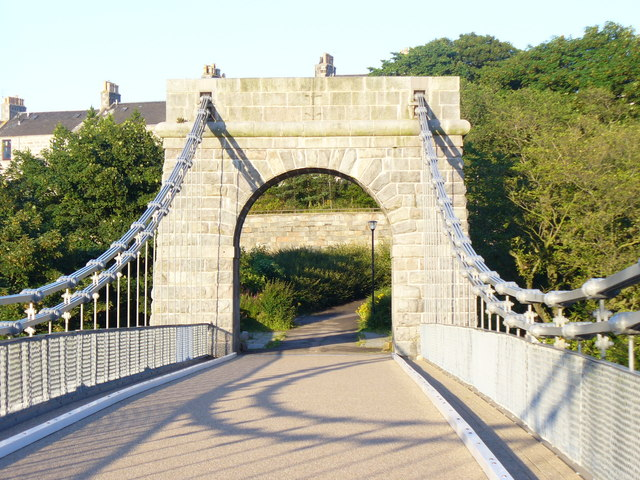
The Wellington Suspension Bridge, pictured in 2009 after restoration

The Wellington Suspension Bridge (also known as the Chain Bridge and Craiglug Bridge) is a suspension bridge crossing the River Dee from Ferryhill to Craiglug in Aberdeen, north east Scotland. Designed by Captain Samuel Brown and the Aberdeen City Architect John Smith, it was opened to pedestrians in November 1830 and to traffic in May 1831. The chain bridge was closed in 1984 to vehicles and then pedestrians in 2002, but was restored in 2006/07 and pedestrian use was re-instated in 2008.

== History ==
Aberdeen was undergoing rapid expansion in the early 19th century and landowners in Torry, the Menzies family of Pitfodels, wished to capitalise on the opportunities arising from the establishment of the turnpike road between Aberdeen and Stonehaven in 1799. A series of legal disputes as to exact ownership of the lands ended in arbitration.

An Act of Parliament was eventually obtained by the Heritors of Nigg and the Road Trustees in 1828 for a bridge to replace the Craiglug Ferry. The City Architect in Aberdeen John Smith and his rival Archibald Simpson were asked to tender design proposals for the bridge and its approach roads from the north and south side in June 1829. The design for the architectural sections was awarded to Smith working in collaboration with Captain Samuel Brown who undertook the engineering designs of the suspension and span. The metalwork was manufactured at the nearby Ferryhill Foundry owned by James Abernethy (1809–1879), a cousin of James Abernethy. Abernethy was the engineer who supervised the work.

In March 1830 the trustees chose to name the bridge after the Iron Duke, Wellington, although it is also known as the Chain Bridge and the Craiglug Bridge. The foundation stone was put in place in 1829 and the bridge was in pedestrian use from November 1830. Six months later, in May 1831, it was opened to use by vehicles.

The costs of building the bridge totalled £10,000.

== Construction ==
Pairs of bar-link saddle chains one above another with suspender rods hold the deck, which is 220 feet (67 m) in length and 22 feet (6.7 m) wide. (Note: The Canmore figures reproduced from Paxton and Shipway, 2007 for 'Civil Engineering heritage: Scotland - Highlands and Islands' give a slightly different figure of 215 ft span with 25 ft wide deck.) Thomas Telford's method of "three lines of rectangular cross-section eye-bar links with short connecting links and cross-bolted" was copied from his 1822 Menai Suspension Bridge construction. The chains were installed on either side of the deck, one above the other with a dip of 18 feet (5.5 m), giving a span ratio of 1:12. James Slight described the bridge as "the strongest bridge that Capt. Brown has yet erected" and he assessed the highest chain stress was around "812 tons sq. in. and all the bars were proved to 9 tons sq. in." The chains bear the stamp "Cable TF&S" and were obtained from Thomson, Forman and Son, of Pontypridd.

The chains are anchored at each end to twin pylons with semi-circular archways; these were constructed from bull-faced granite by Robert Mearns. Modifications were made to the north end archway in 1886 and a stone engraved with the date is mounted at the apex of the arch to signify this.

The approach roads, designed by Smith with the bridge, were 3 miles (4.8 km) in length and incorporated a slow ramp from College Street on the northern side; a new road also ran from around Nigg to the Craiglug side on the south approach.

An octagonal toll house, also designed by Smith, was originally sited on the northwest corner of the bridge.

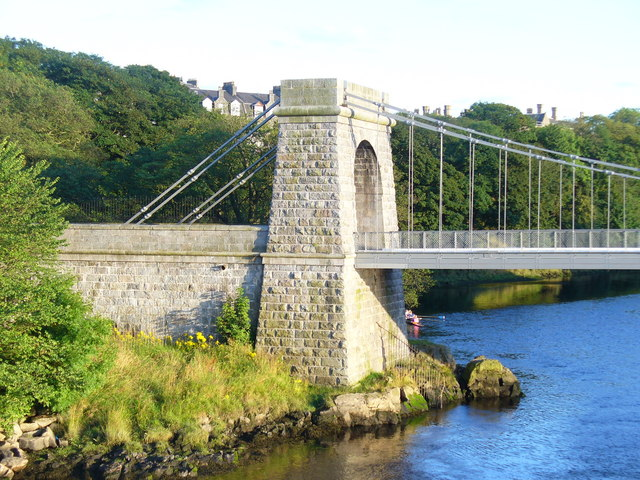
The architectural pylon on the Torry side of the bridge

== Restoration ==
The bridge underwent some restoration work in 1930 when steel replaced the cast iron bearers and wrought iron suspenders. Of the original iron work, only the main chains remained.

The toll house was derelict in 1964 and was demolished soon after.

Further restoration work was done on the bridge in 1984 after a replacement bridge, the Queen Elizabeth Bridge, was finished, as this enabled the suspension bridge to be closed to vehicles. Due to safety concerns, in 2002 it was also closed to pedestrians. After Aberdeen City Council engineers undertook further work to preserve and strengthen the bridge, it resumed use as a pedestrian walkway and cycle lane in 2008. The main chains were still retained. The work was carried out in four phases. The first step comprised repairing welding of the main chains and saddle chain replacement. The next stage involved renewing the timber decking and structural re-painting. Phase three concentrated on the granite towers and included re-pointing and cleaning; the final stage was to provide architectural lighting. Total costs were estimated at £760,000 and were expected to preserve the bridge for another century.

Aberdeen City councillors were informed in October 2007 that the cost for the first three phases had increased to £995,000 and the estimate for the final stage would be £100,000.

From 1979 until 2010 it was listed as a scheduled monument; from 2010, it was included on the list of Category A listed structures.

== Incidents ==
The A945 passes under the bridge. On 20 October 2017, an off-service double-decker bus struck the bridge.

== See also ==
- List of bridges in Scotland
- Transport in Aberdeen
