= B9077 road =

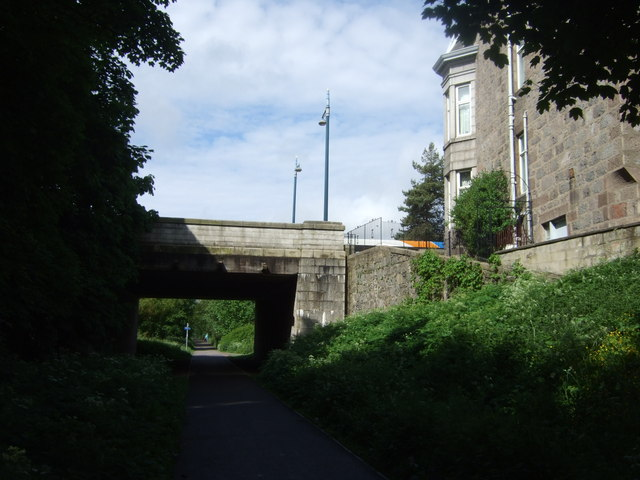
B9077 road bridge Over the old Deeside Railway track.

The B9077 road is a public highway in Aberdeenshire, Scotland that connects the city of Aberdeen to the southern part of Banchory. The road crosses River Dee on the King George VI Bridge in Aberdeen. Outside the city the road has two traffic lanes and runs along the south bank of the River Dee, and in many places provides good views of the river. The road provides access to several historic and prehistoric features in south Deeside including Balbridie, Bucharn and Maryculter House. The highway numbering has been changed since 1985. Other historic features in the general vicinity are Crathes Castle, Milton of Crathes, and Netherley House.

== Ancient history ==
The Neolithic long house of Balbridie lies along the course of the road, somewhat west of Maryculter. Near this location was the intersection of the ancient Elsick Mounth, that served as a medieval drovers' road and additionally the track of the march between Normandykes and Raedykes Roman Camps.
