= First Aberdeen bus routes 1 and 2 =

Bus Routes in Aberdeen, Scotland

1, 1B, N1, 2
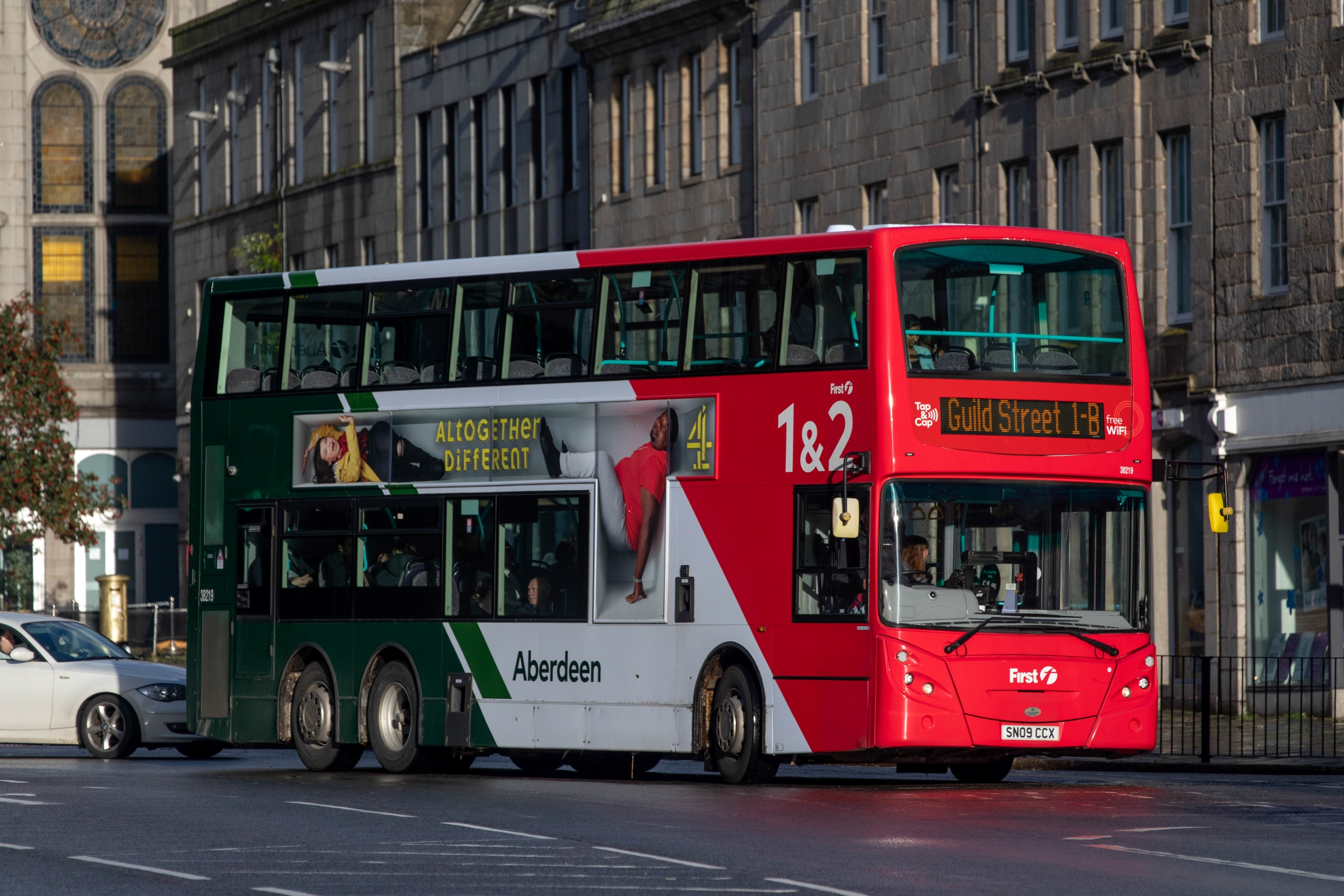
- A routes 1 and 2 branded Alexander Dennis Enviro500

Overview
- Operator: First Aberdeen
- Status: Operating

Route
- Start: Ashwood Park, Bridge of Don Park and Ride, Danestone, Dubford
- Via: Union Street
- End: Garthdee

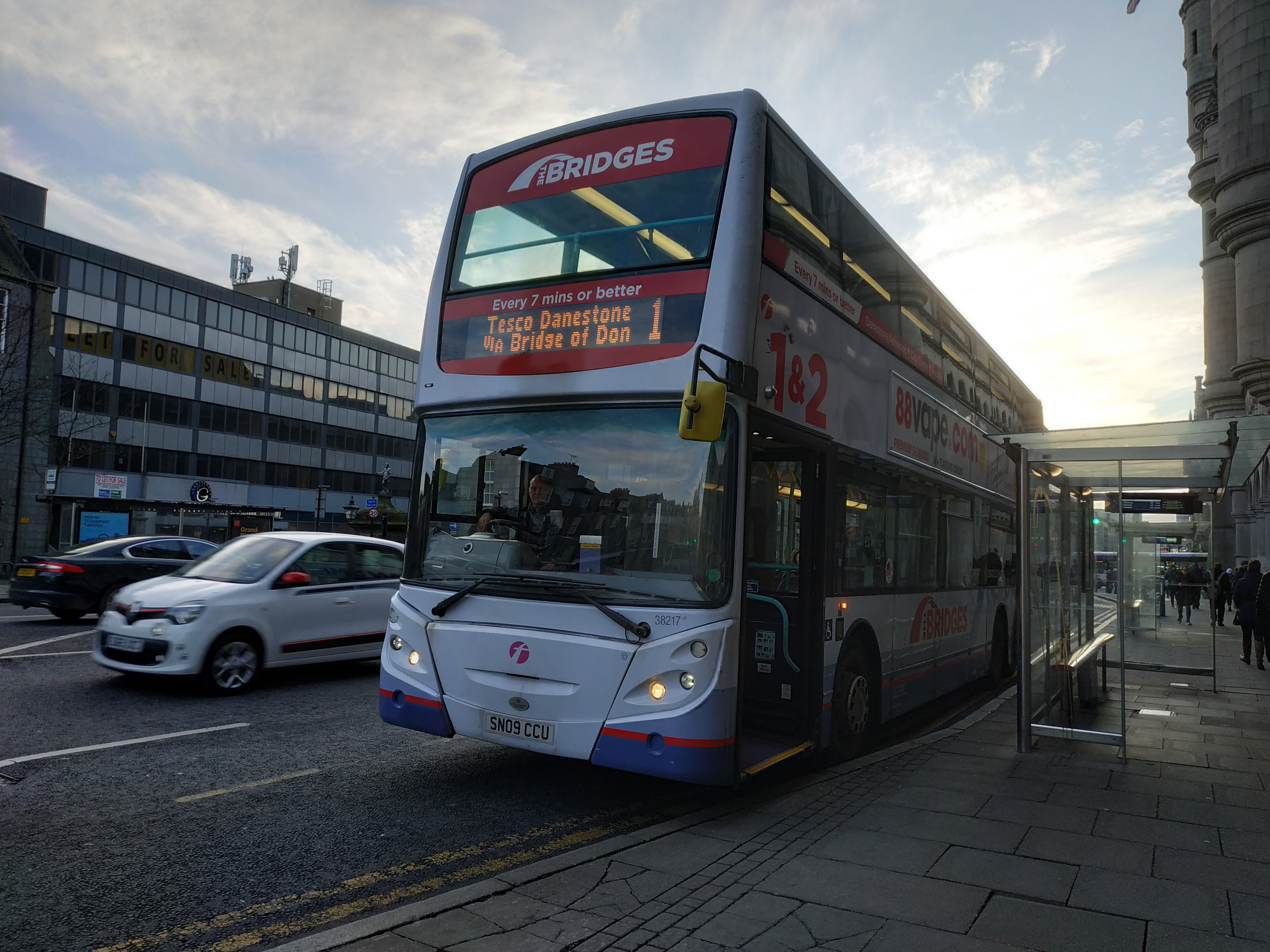
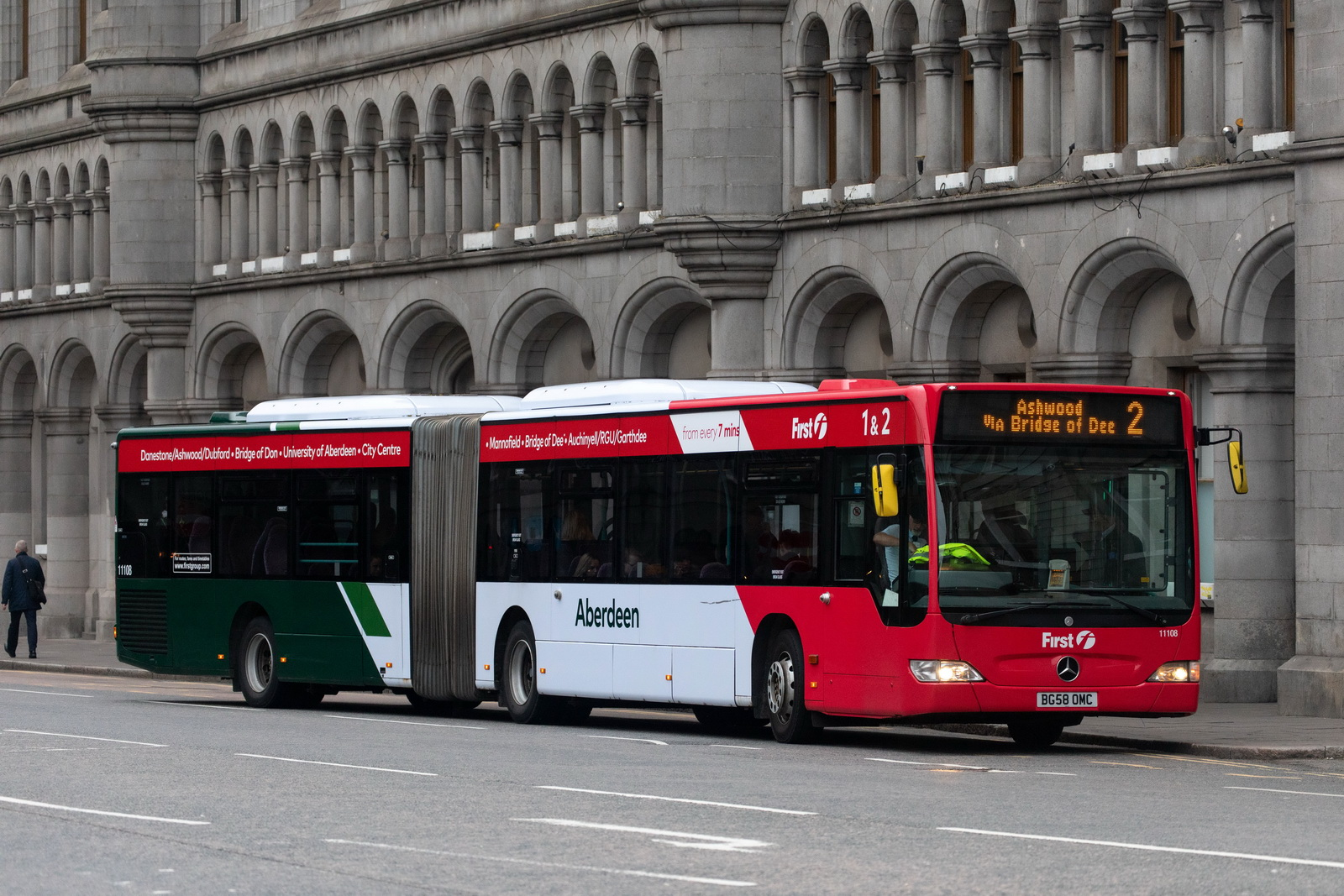
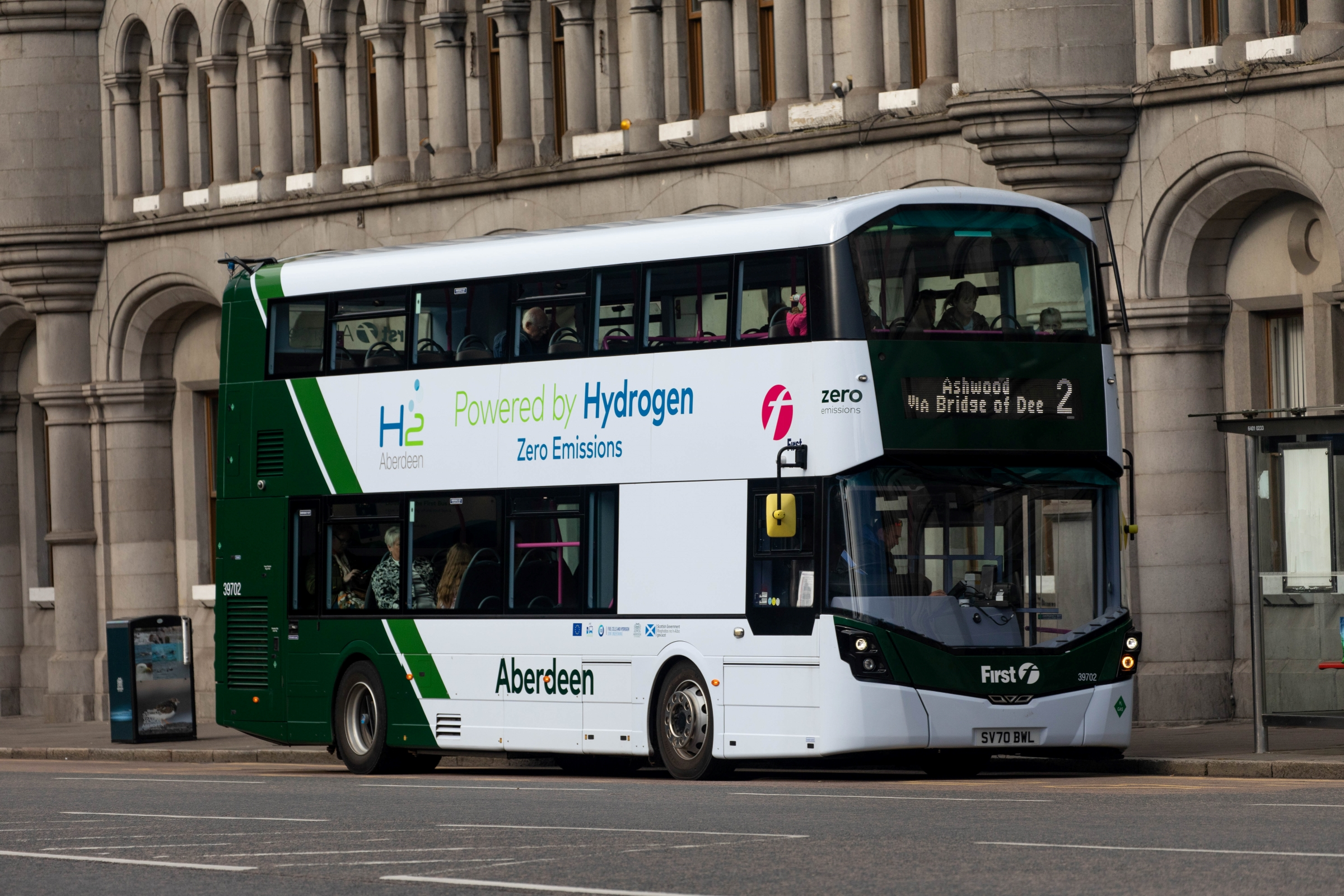
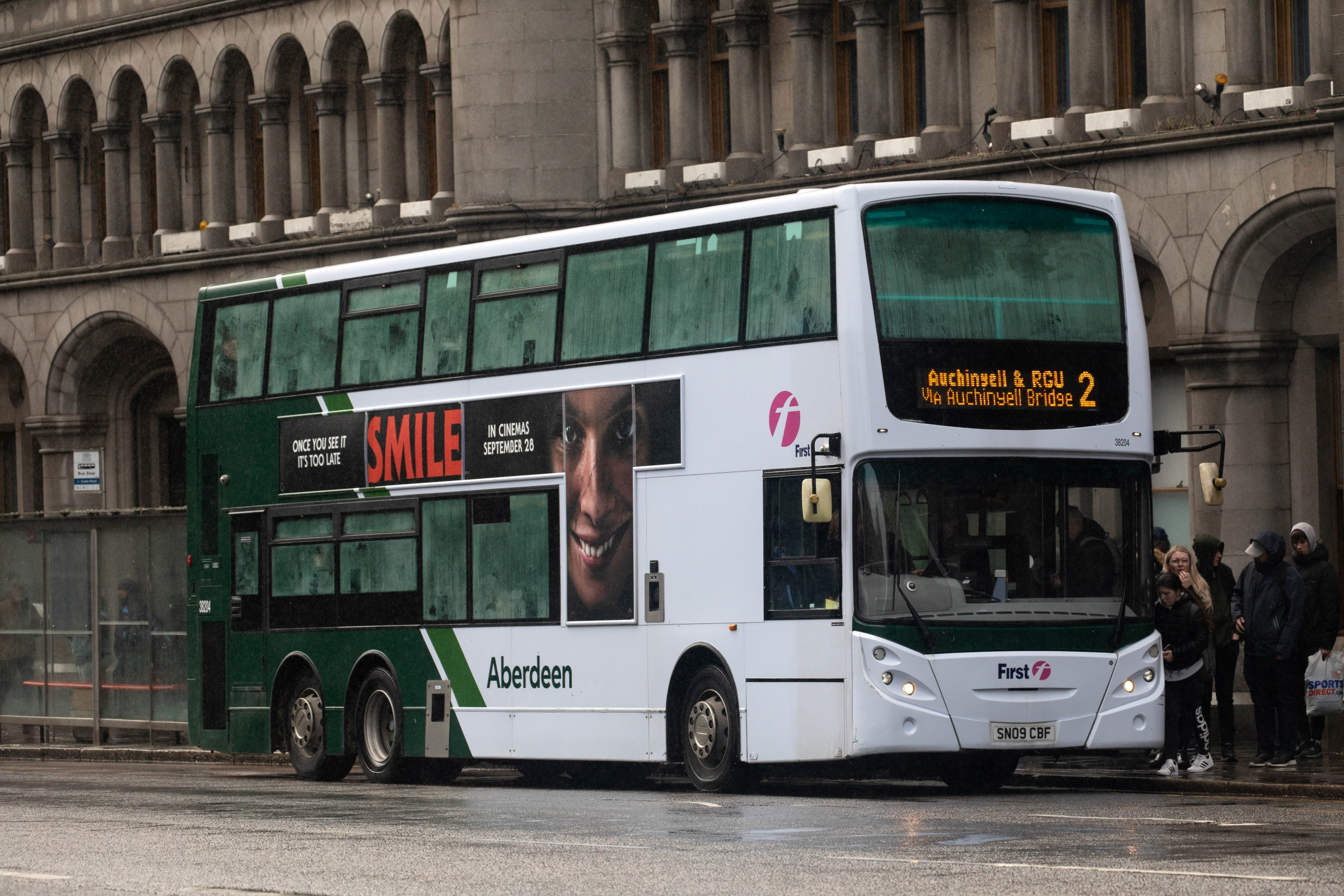
Buses on route 1 and 2

Routes 1, 1B, N1 and 2 are bus routes in Aberdeen operated by First Aberdeen.

== History ==
Route 1 was created to replace the "Bridges" Aberdeen Corporation Tramways route in the late 1950s.

Route 2 was formerly numbered 21, it was renumbered in the 1960s.

Service 1A, which offered an express service from Robert Gordon University to the city centre, was withdrawn in March 2020. It was reintroduced on 20 February 2023.

The Bridges branding was lost after the introduction of new buses on the route.

Articulated buses operated on route 1 and 2 until 26 March 2025.

Service N1 was introduced in 2025, linking the City centre to Danestone.

== Route ==
Routes 1 and 2 are shared between the Bridge of Don and Great Southern Road. Route 1 takes a clockwise route through Garthdee, while route 2 takes an anti-clockwise route.

The route has suffered from overcrowding between Union Street and Robert Gordon University with people at intermediate stops not being able to board at busy times.

=== Variations ===
Number	Start	End
1	Danestone	Garthdee
1B	Dubford or Bridge of Don Park and Ride	Garthdee
2	Ashwood Park	Garthdee
