= King George VI Bridge =

Arch bridge in Aberdeen, Scotland

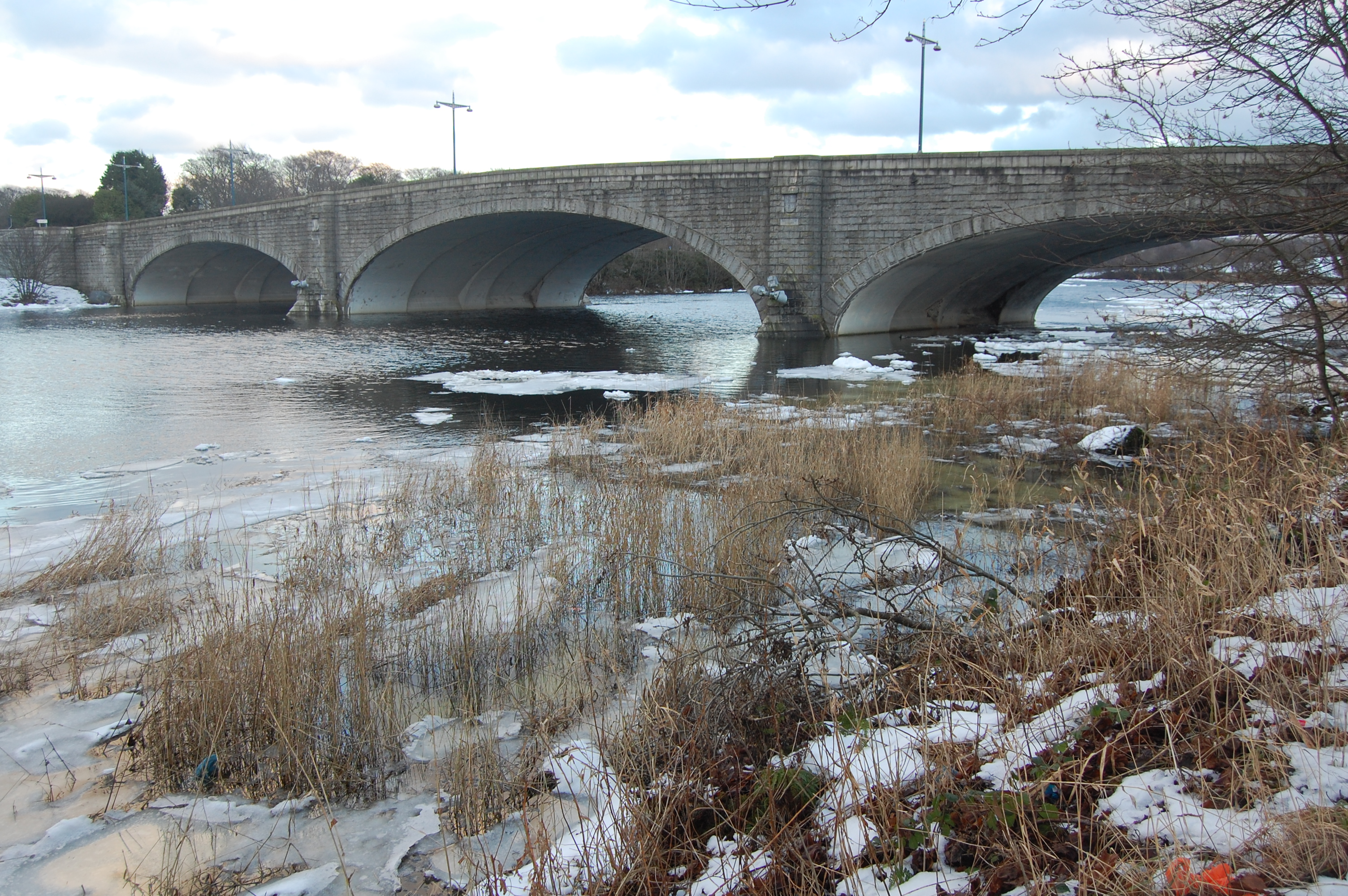
- View of the bridge from the west
- Coordinates: 57.12838°N 2.10793°W
- OS grid reference: NJ 93565 04167
- Carries: B9077
- Crosses: River Dee
- Locale: Aberdeen
- Named for: King George VI
- Preceded by: Bridge of Dee
- Followed by: Ferryhill Railway Viaduct

Characteristics
- Material: Concrete

History
- Inaugurated: 1941

Listed Building – Category B
- Official name: King George VI Bridge Over River Dee, At Great Southern Road
- Designated: 12 January 1967
- Reference no.: LB20070

Location
- Interactive map of King George VI Bridge

The King George VI Bridge is a bridge over the River Dee in Aberdeen, Scotland.

The official opening of the bridge on 10th March 1941: Queen Elizabeth and King George VI shaking hands with Councillor John D Munro who was convener of the streets and works committee when the George VI Bridge over the Dee was erected.

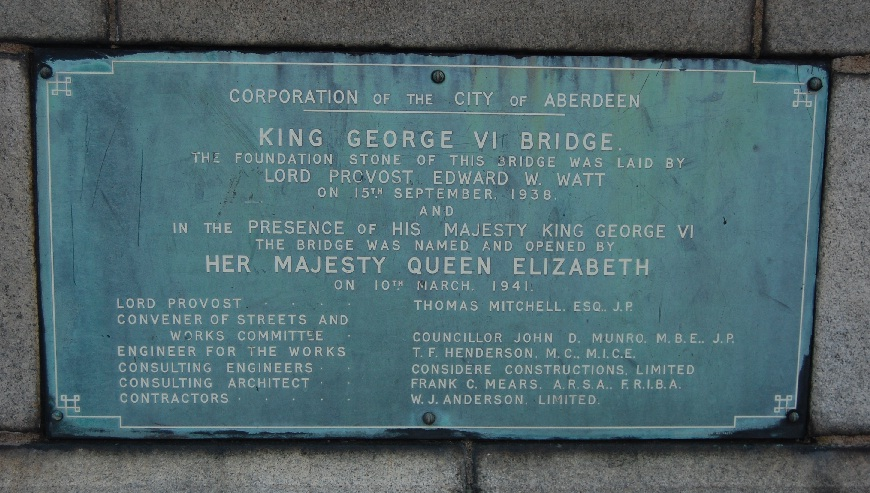
Plaque on West side of the bridge

The foundation stone of the bridge was laid by the Lord Provost Edward W. Watt on 15 September 1938. It was officially opened by Queen Elizabeth in the presence of her husband King George VI on 10 December 1941. Today the bridge carries the Great Southern Road (B9077) into Aberdeen from the south.

== See also ==
- List of bridges in Scotland
- Transport in Aberdeen
