= Nigg Bay, Aberdeen =

Cove to the east of Aberdeen, Scotland

Coordinates: 57°08′00″N 02°03′00″W

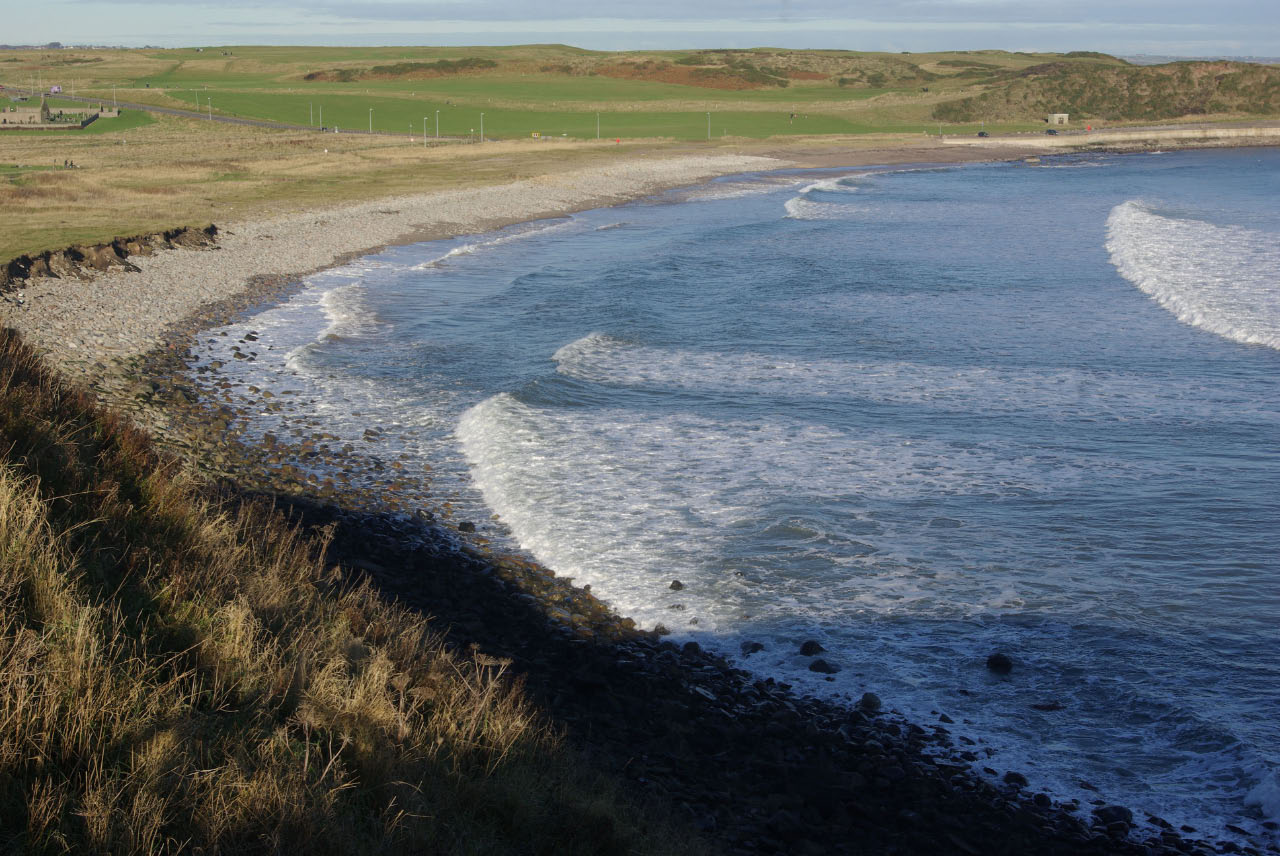
Nigg Bay prior to development

Nigg Bay is a cove to the east of Aberdeen, between Girdle Ness and Greg Ness, in the old parish of Nigg. The ruined parish church, St Fittick's, lies a short distance from the shore. It is said to have been founded by Fittick, an Irish monk who was washed ashore here after a group of sailors threw him overboard during a storm.

In 2012, Nigg Bay emerged as the preferred location for Aberdeen Harbour's planned expansion, North Beach and Cove Bay having been ruled out. Work began on the £420 million expansion project in 2017, but was interrupted in 2020 by the COVID-19 pandemic. Despite this setback, the Nigg Bay expansion opened in 2023 as Aberdeen South Harbour.
