= Ferryhill Railway Viaduct =

19th century bridge in Aberdeen, Scotland

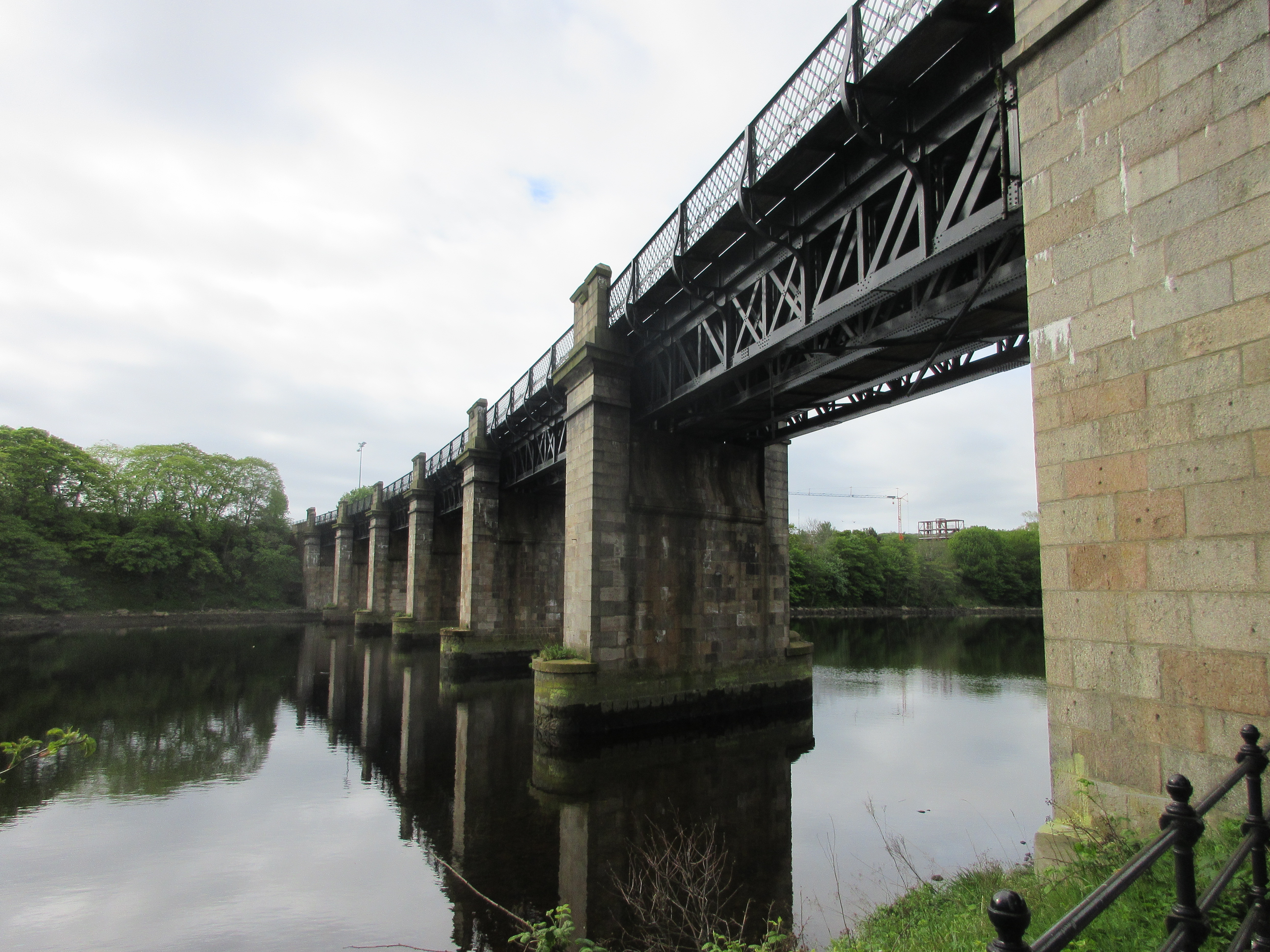
- Bridge crossing the River Dee
- Coordinates: 57.12985°N 2.09581°W
- OS grid reference: NJ 94299 04330
- Carries: Dundee–Aberdeen line
- Crosses: River Dee
- Locale: Aberdeen
- Preceded by: King George VI Bridge
- Followed by: Wellington Suspension Bridge

Characteristics
- Design: Truss and arch
- Material: Steel, granite and sandstone
- Total length: 259 metres (283 yd)
- Height: 15.2 metres (50 ft)
- No. of spans: 11

History
- Opened: 1850

Listed Building – Category C(S)
- Official name: Aberdeen, Ferryhill Railway Viaduct
- Designated: 29 February 2000
- Reference no.: LB46800

Location
- Interactive map of Ferryhill Railway Viaduct

The Ferryhill Railway Viaduct is a railway bridge crossing the River Dee in Aberdeen, Scotland. Construction started in 1848, and the viaduct opened to railway traffic in 1850 to service the Ferryhill railway station.

The bridge has eleven spans: seven steel trusses and four stone arches. The trusses are supported by granite and sandstone piers and cross the River Dee. The arches are on the north side of the river. The bridge originally had wooden arches, which were replaced by the steel trusses. The bridge is approximately 259 metres (0.16 mi) long and 15 metres (49 ft) high.

It was designated a category C listed building in 2000.

== See also ==
- List of bridges in Scotland
- Transport in Aberdeen
