= River Dee ferryboat disaster =

1876 maritime disaster

Coordinates: 57.139°N 2.089°W

The River Dee Ferry Boat Disaster occurred on 5 April 1876. Thirty two people drowned in the mouth of the River Dee, Aberdeenshire, Scotland, when their ferry boat capsized. Overcrowding, fast flowing current and a poorly spliced wire rope were blamed.

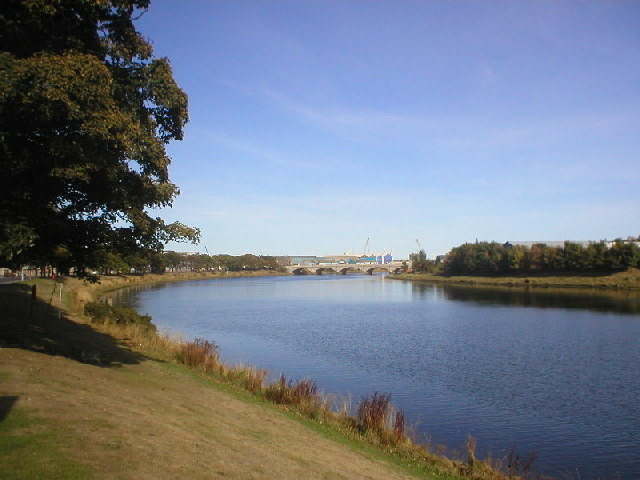
River Dee, looking towards Victoria Bridge. This is close to the location that the ferry capsized.

== Context ==
The city of Aberdeen lies at the mouth of the River Dee in North East Scotland. This is a tidal part of the river and can be subject to powerful currents. In 1876 Torry, on the south bank of the river, was part of Kincardineshire and distinct from the Royal Burgh of Aberdeen, which lay on the north bank. In 1891 Torry was incorporated into the county of the city of Aberdeen.

The ferry route was a busy and profitable route between the Pocra Quay on the North and Torry on the south. It had operated for centuries. At the time of the accident, the big ferry boat was operated by a pulley system, attached by a rope to each river bank. This allowed it to be pulled across the river without the need for an engine, sails or rudder on the boat. Other boats continued to transport passengers across the route, particularly on busy days. The wire-boat was crossing the new channel of the River Dee where the current could be faster.

The wire ferry boat was built by William Hall, ship and boatbuilder with dimensions of 25 feet (7.6 m) length, 8 feet 10 1/2 inches (2.705 m) width and 2 feet 4 inches (0.71 m) in depth. It was fitted with a large wheel and two friction rollers for the wire that was strung across the river and would carry eight tons. When tested with sixty men on board she was stable in the water, but there was no room for anyone to sit and was therefore toploaded. Oars and rowlocks were available on board.

The ferry was licensed by the city council to carry thirty two people, however this was an old agreement and had not been updated for the new, larger wire-boat.

== The disaster ==
Wednesday 5 April was a Sacramental Fast in the city and the weather was also fine. This encouraged many people to visit the fair in Torry and the Bay of Nigg, therefore crossing the River Dee by ferry or by bridge further up river.

After several days of rain, the river was swollen and fast flowing. Snow melt may also have contributed. The previous day the wire-boat was not run for a time due to the fast current, and journeys were made by row boats instead.

The boat had already crossed the river a number of times on 5 April. On its final journey many people pushed to get on board at the north bank. Policemen had been drafted in by Alexander Kennedy, the tacksman and leaseholder of the ferry route because the day was expected to be busy. They were to help with the crowds, but their role did not include preventing overcrowding on the boat itself. This was agreed to be responsibility of the tacksman. There was no "tumult or breach of the peace" among the crowds.

There were normally two ferryman on the boat for each journey. On the fateful crossing, William Masson, the more experienced of the two, was concerned about the overcrowding and the speed of the current. He testified that he thought the wire-boat would be laid up for about an hour to allow the current to slow when the tide slackened. He also reported that he raised concerns with Kennedy about overcrowding, but Kennedy claimed not to have heard. Masson went to get his colleague a drink of water, and on his return the boat was already crossing the river. It was the only crossing that day that he did not go on the boat.

Seventy six people were on the ferry when it entered the river. It began to list as it moved mid-stream and into the faster current. Witnesses reported twice being asked to move around to counter the imbalance. The wire became slack from the Torry side. When this was pulled up the boat jerked and the wire snapped at a poorly made splice. This movement caused the capsize of the ferry.

Some of the passengers were able to swim to safety. One woman and others were rescued by the woman's husband in his small yawl. He had launched because he was concerned about the state of the ferry and felt catastrophe was likely. Other small craft came to the aid of those in the water, but the larger ferry boats were too high on the beach to be launched quickly.

Thirty two people died in the tragedy. Most were from Aberdeen, and ranged in age from nine to fifty years old. Forty four people were rescued. A full list of missing and rescued people was published in the Aberdeen Journal on 12 April.

== Inquiry ==
A public inquiry was held in Aberdeen by the Board of Trade. This was the first such inquiry held in Scotland and was chaired by Captain Harris of the Royal Navy. It was well attended by members of the public. Witnesses reported that the river was flowing very fast, and that the wire-boat was more at risk than those being rowed across the water. The matter of overcrowding was also felt to be significant, but the poorly spliced wire was perhaps ultimately to blame.

== Aftermath ==
A fund was set up to support those affected. Funds were donated from subscriptions and from fundraising.

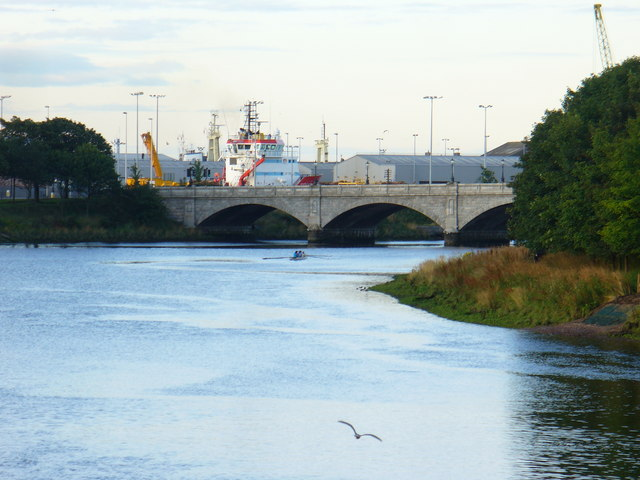
Queen Victoria Bridge

There had been plans for some time for a new bridge across to Torry but the final impetus was provided by the disaster and Queen Victoria Bridge was formally opened on 2 July 1881.

The bridge was partly funded by public subscription and partly by the Corporation of Aberdeen Council, and provides direct access from Torry into the heart of Aberdeen.

A plaque commemorating those who died in this disaster was erected on the bridge in 2005.

== See also ==
- List of United Kingdom disasters by death toll
