= Hillhead Student Village =

Halls of Residence for the University of Aberdeen

Coordinates: 57.175°N 2.102°W

- Student accommodation
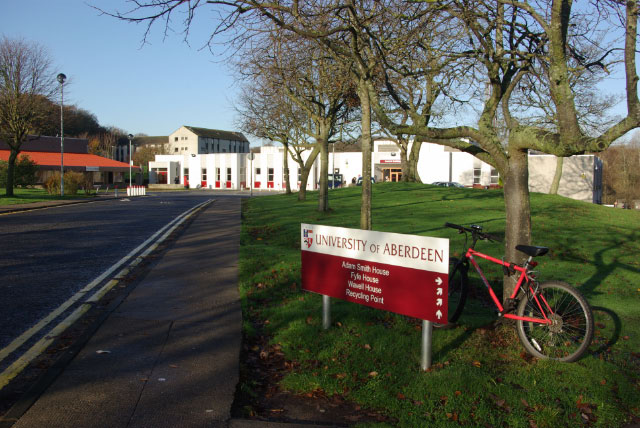
- The central building in 2009
- Interactive map of Hillhead Student Village

Hillhead Student Village (formerly Hillhead Halls of Residence) is a group of buildings that provide accommodation for students at the University of Aberdeen.

== History ==
Hillhead Halls was built in response to the post-war expansion of the university. The first phase of the Hillhead Halls of Residence was opened in 1968 and as a result this was the first year that the university could offer accommodation to every female applicant and a majority of male applicants. The previous year, five out of six applicants were refused. The first blocks to open were Adam Smith House, Fyfe House, and Wavell House. When combined with the existing Crombie, Johnston, and Dunbar halls, the university had a total of 1168 places available.

Hillhead has since been expanded with the newest accommodation block, New Carnegie Court, opened in 2008.

The original campus store was refitted to become a Co-op in 2021, undergoing a £300,000 refit, however it closed following the discovery of RAAC. In November 2025, a new shop, operated by Greens Retail, was opened on the site.

In April 2026, a student died at New Carnegie Court, leading to a police investigation.

== Location ==
Hillhead Student Village is situated beside the River Don and Seaton Park. The King's College campus is accessible by walking through Seaton Park.

== Facilities ==
The central building at Hillhead contains a social area, study spaces, meeting rooms, a gym hall, and an Amazon parcel locker. Next to the central building, there are bike storage sheds and a launderette. Free parking is also available.

== Transportation ==
Starting in late 1968, the number 20 bus service which ran from Marischal College to Old Aberdeen was extended to serve Hillhead.

The number 20 bus route connects Hillhead to the city centre. Route 13 also extends to Hillhead during evenings and weekends. The 9U runs between Hillhead, the Sir Duncan Rice Library, and Aberdeen Royal Infirmary. It was also historically connected by routes 21 and 60.
