= Queen Victoria Bridge =

Bridge in Aberdeen, Scotland

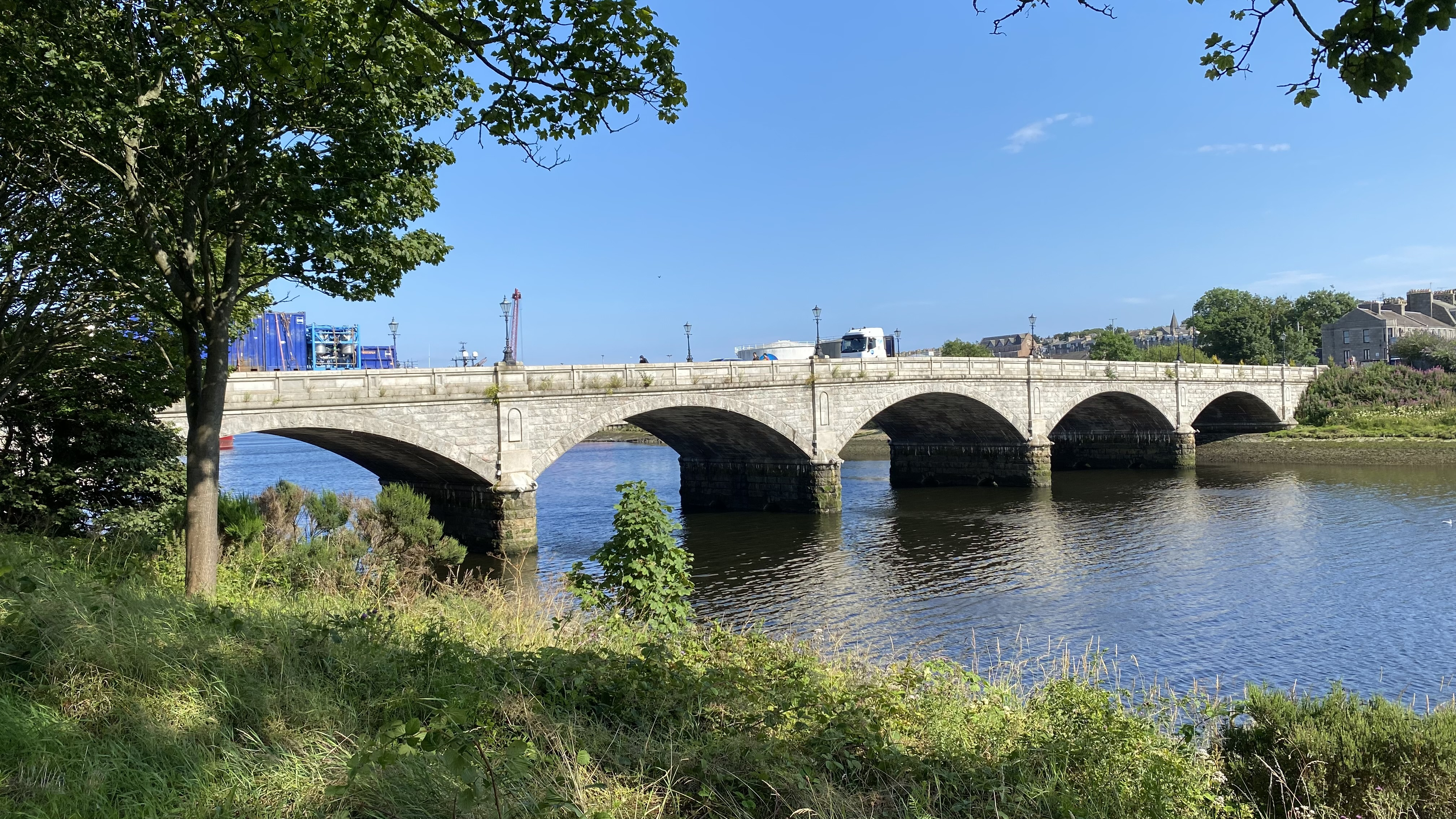
- Victoria Bridge on a sunny day
- Coordinates: 57.140032°N 2.089541°W
- OS grid reference: NJ 94680 05460
- Carries: Road, Pedestrians
- Crosses: River Dee
- Locale: Aberdeen
- Other name: Victoria Bridge
- Named for: Queen Victoria
- Preceded by: Queen Elizabeth Bridge

Characteristics
- Material: Stone

History
- Opened: 1881

Listed Building – Category B
- Official name: Victoria Bridge Over River Dee, At Market Street And Victoria Road
- Designated: 12 January 1967
- Reference no.: LB20072

Location
- Interactive map of Queen Victoria Bridge

Queen Victoria Bridge, also known as Victoria Bridge, is a road bridge across the River Dee linking the main part of the City of Aberdeen with Torry and the southern areas of the city.

It was opened in May 1881. Built by Aberdeen City Council and partly funded by public subscription, it was constructed partly in response to the River Dee ferryboat disaster of 5 April 1876.

== See also ==
- List of bridges in Scotland
- Transport in Aberdeen
