= First Aberdeen bus route 13 =

Bus route in Aberdeen, Scotland

13
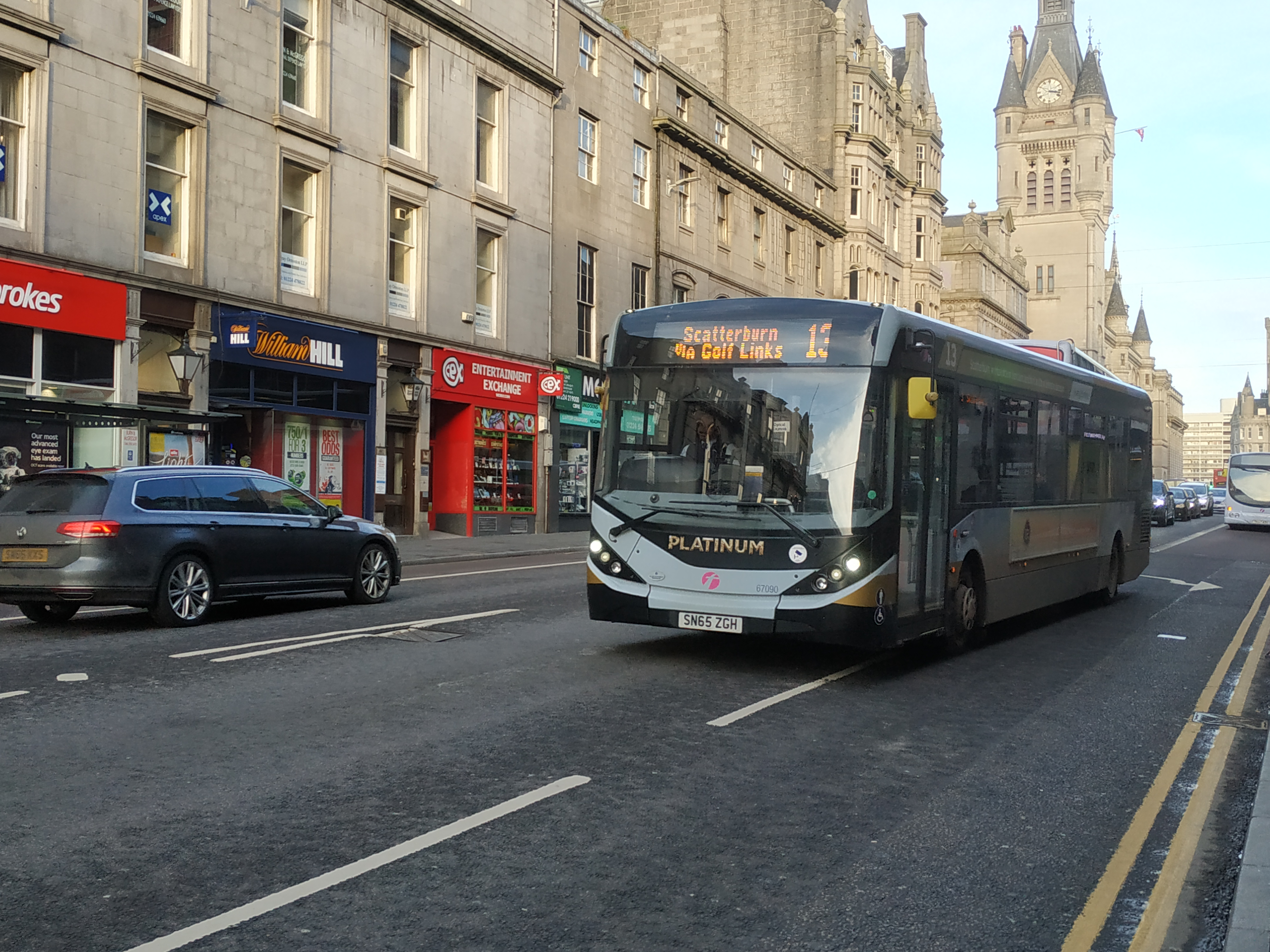

Overview
- Operator: First Aberdeen
- Status: Operating

Route
- Start: Scatterburn
- Via: Union Street
- End: Seaton; Hillhead of Seaton (evenings and weekends)

Route 13 is a bus route in Aberdeen operated by First Aberdeen. It operates at a 20 minute frequency at peak times.

== History ==
In January 2016, branded Platinum buses were deployed on the route. They were the first in Aberdeen to include USB chargers.

On 3 July 2022, the route was altered to use Links Road instead of Park Street and to call at the Beach Retail Park, following the rerouting of route 15. The route was also extended during evenings and weekends to terminate at Hillhead of Seaton.

From 6 November 2022, a diversion to Footdee was added for four journeys in each direction on a six month trial basis. Footdee had been left with no bus service following the rerouting of service 15 in July.
