= Queen Elizabeth Bridge, Aberdeen =

Road bridge in Aberdeen, Scotland

Queen Elizabeth Bridge
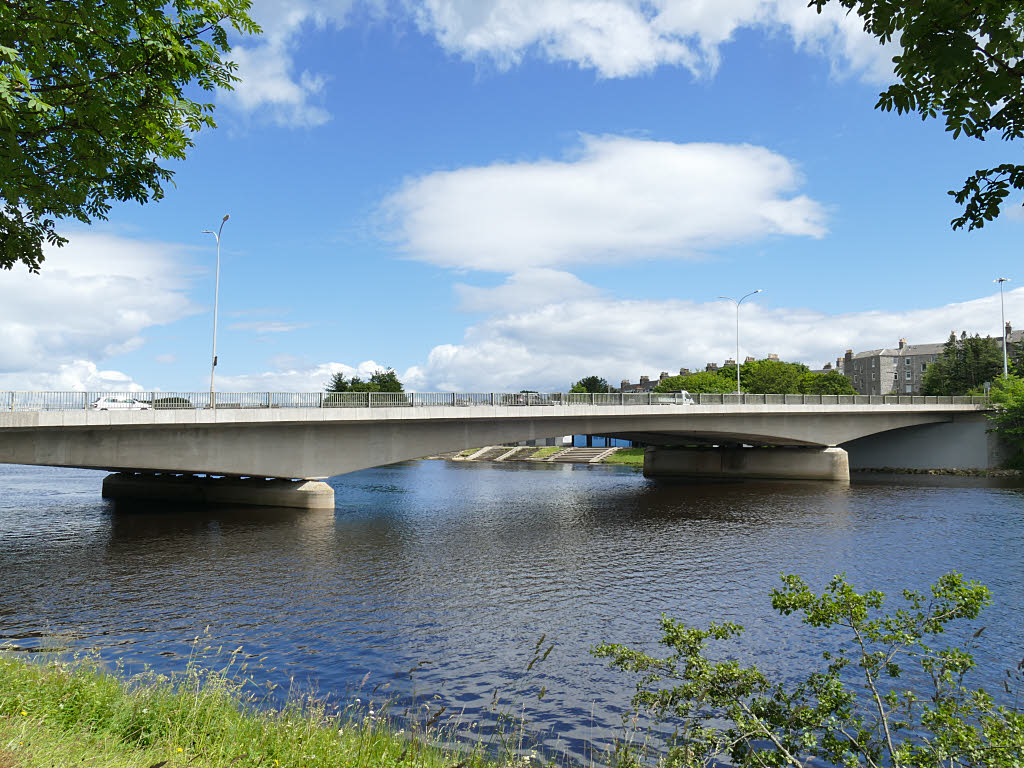
- Bridge crossing the River Dee
- Coordinates: 57.13628°N 2.09551°W
- OS grid reference: NJ 94318 05045
- Carries: A956
- Crosses: River Dee
- Locale: Aberdeen
- Preceded by: Wellington Suspension Bridge
- Followed by: Queen Victoria Bridge

Characteristics
- Material: Concrete
- Total length: 110 metres (360 ft)
- No. of spans: 3

History
- Opened: December 1983
- Inaugurated: 10 August 1984

Location
- Interactive map of Queen Elizabeth Bridge

Queen Elizabeth Bridge is a road crossing over the River Dee in Aberdeen, Scotland. It carries a dual carriageway (part of the A956 route) and pavements on either side.

== History ==
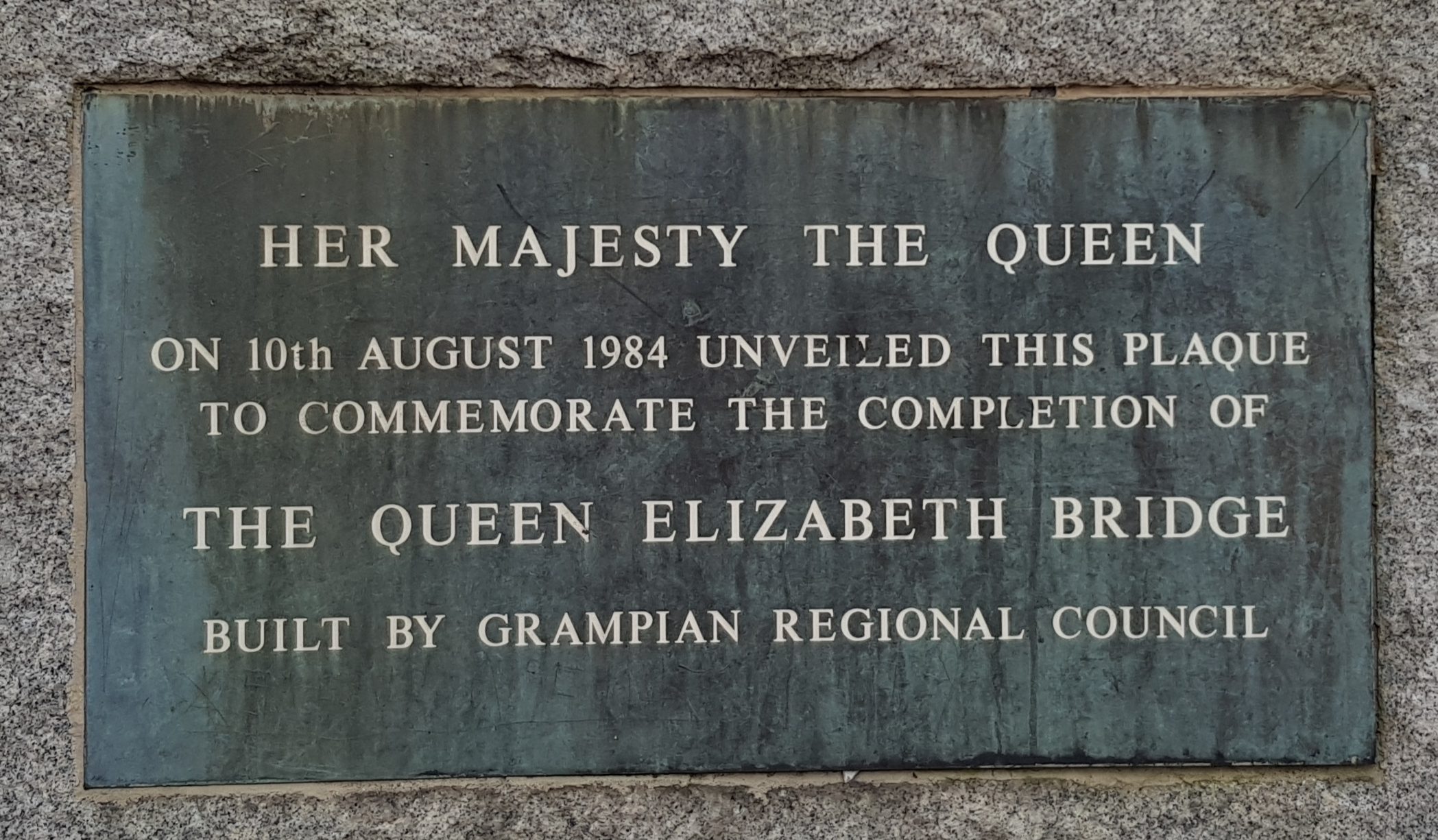
Plaque commemorating the opening of the bridge

In 1978, Grampian Regional Council approached the Scottish Development Department with a view to constructing the bridge as a replacement for the Wellington Suspension Bridge. The estimated cost at the time was £2 million.

During construction, the bridge was referred to as the New Wellington Bridge. The bridge opened to traffic in December 1983. In April 1984, the bridge was named Queen Elizabeth Bridge. The bridge was officially opened by Elizabeth II on 10 August 1984.

== Structure ==
The bridge is 110 metres (360 feet) long and has three spans.

== See also ==
- List of bridges in Scotland
- Transport in Aberdeen
