= Dubford, Aberdeen =

Housing estate in Aberdeen, Scotland

Coordinates: 57°12′11″N 2°06′02″W

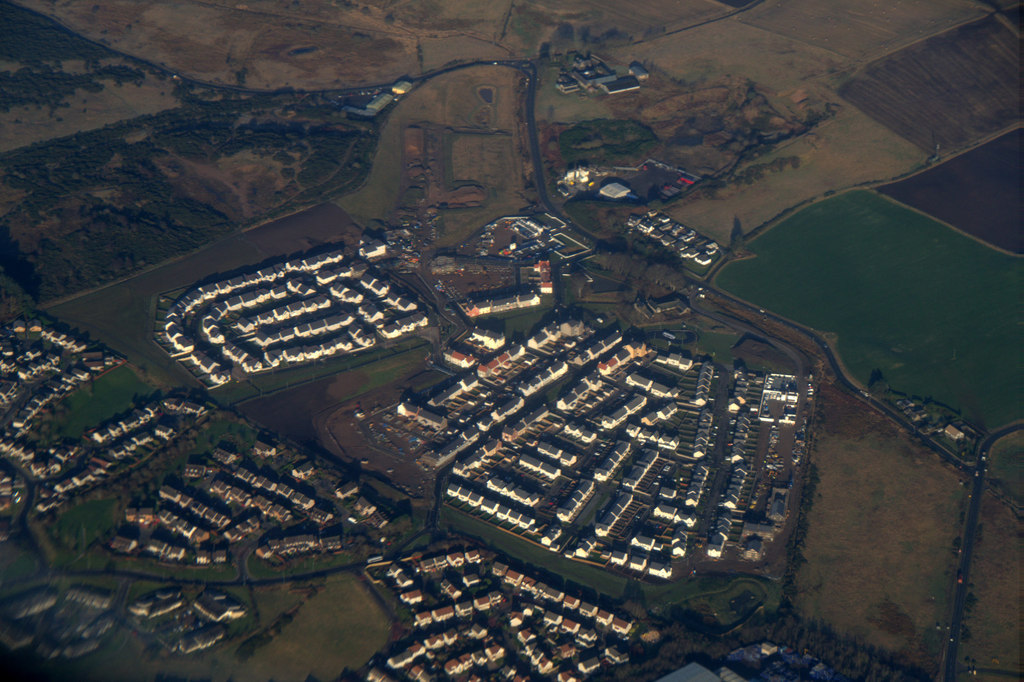
Aerial photo of Dubford in February 2017

Dubford is a housing estate of approximately 550 homes, north of Denmore within the Bridge of Don suburb in the north of Aberdeen, Scotland.

Dubford takes its name from the farmstead on which it was built. Aberdeen City Council commissioned an outline plan for its development, published as the Dubford Development Framework, in January 2012. The Aberdeen Local Development Plan 2017 specifies that 550 homes were extant in Dubford by 2016. Scotia Homes advertises the estate as one of its developments.
