= Nigg, Aberdeen =

Area of Aberdeen, Scotland

Coordinates: 57°07′N 2°06′W

Nigg
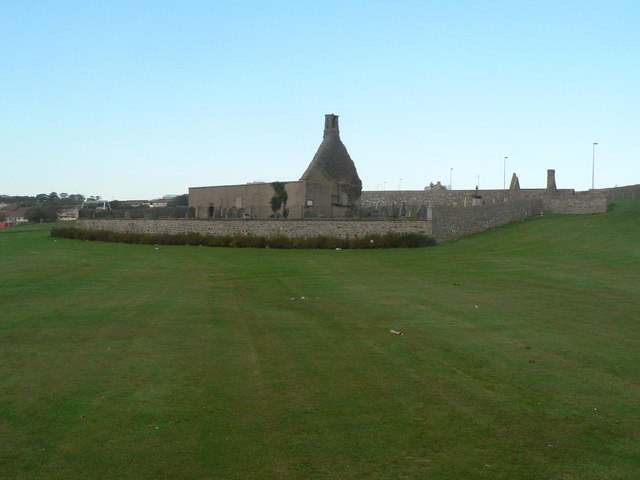
- St Fittick's church

- Location within the Aberdeen City council area Location within Scotland
- Council area: Aberdeen City
- Lieutenancy area: Aberdeen
- Country: Scotland
- Sovereign state: United Kingdom
- Post town: ABERDEEN
- Postcode district: AB12
- Dialling code: 01224
- Police: Scotland
- Fire: Scottish
- Ambulance: Scottish

Nigg is an area of Aberdeen, Scotland, south of the River Dee. It has a population of 16,400 (2019 estimate). The area has a bay known as the Bay of Nigg or Nigg Bay, immediately south of a coastal golf course, and a farm that is also a visitor attraction, known as Doonies Farm.

== History ==
Nigg is situated somewhat to the east of the ancient Causey Mounth trackway, which route was constructed on high ground to make passable this medieval passage from coastal points south of Stonehaven to Aberdeen. This ancient passage connected the River Dee crossing (where the present Bridge of Dee is situated) via Muchalls Castle and Stonehaven to the south. The route was that taken by William Keith, 7th Earl Marischal and the Marquess of Montrose when they led a Covenanter army of 9,000 men in the battle of the Civil War in 1638.

Nigg was historically a parish in Kincardineshire. It included Altens, Cove Bay, Kincorth and Torry as well as the village of Nigg itself. Torry was transferred into the burgh of Aberdeen in 1891. The burgh of Aberdeen was made a county of itself in 1899. Kincorth and Nigg village were likewise absorbed into the county of the city of Aberdeen in 1935, as was Altens in 1970. The remainder of the parish of Nigg, covering Cove Bay and residual rural areas, was finally absorbed into the City of Aberdeen district in 1975 as part of the same reforms which abolished Kincardineshire County Council.

Doonies Farm in Nigg had been opened in the 1990s as a working farm to showcase different rare breeds of cattle. Due to Aberdeen City Council zoning the farm for a new energy transition zone, they refused to renew the lease to the farm and it closed in 2023 as a result. It was formally wound-up in 2024.

== See also ==
- Cove Bay
- Hare Ness
