= Torry =

Suburb of Aberdeen, Scotland

Coordinates: 57.1367°N 2.0803°W

Torry: Scottish Gaelic: Torraidh
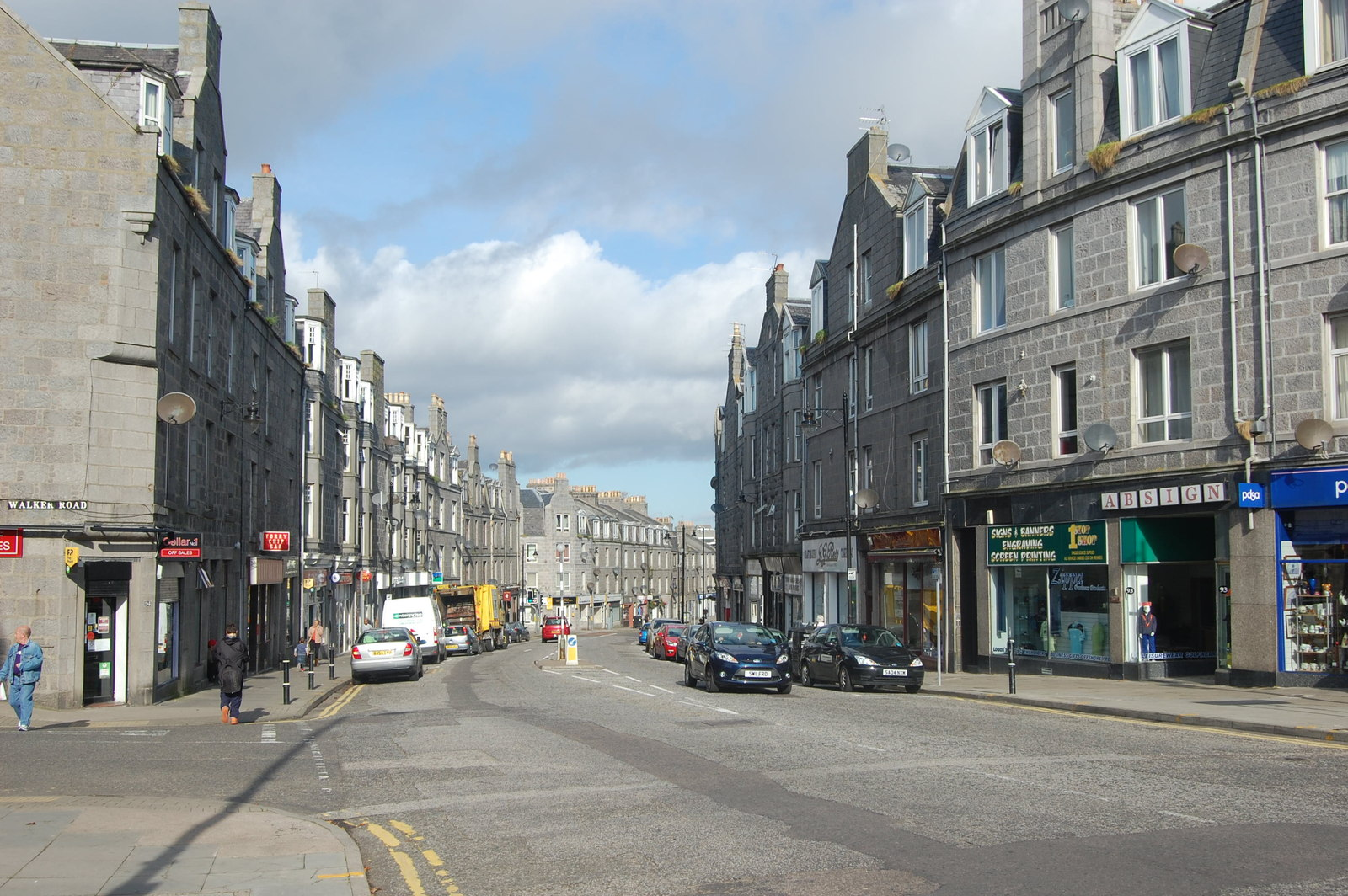
- Victoria Road, Torry

- Location within the Aberdeen City council area Location within Scotland
- Population: 10,465
- OS grid reference: NJ952050
- Council area: Aberdeen City
- Lieutenancy area: Aberdeen
- Country: Scotland
- Sovereign state: United Kingdom
- Post town: ABERDEEN
- Postcode district: AB11
- Dialling code: 01224
- Police: Scotland
- Fire: Scottish
- Ambulance: Scottish
- UK Parliament: Aberdeen South
- Scottish Parliament: Aberdeen South and North Kincardine
- Website: aberdeencity.gov.uk

Torry is a suburb of Aberdeen, Scotland, lying on the south bank of the River Dee. It was historically part of the county of Kincardineshire and was absorbed into the city of Aberdeen in 1891.

== Origin ==
People have been living in Torry since at least the 12th century. The place name first appears in written records in 1484 and was erected a burgh of barony by royal charter from King James IV in 1495.

The first bridge over the River Dee linking Torry with Aberdeen was built in the 1520s, and Torry's first pub, 'le Sandy Velle', is recorded in 1535, serving travellers from Aberdeen.

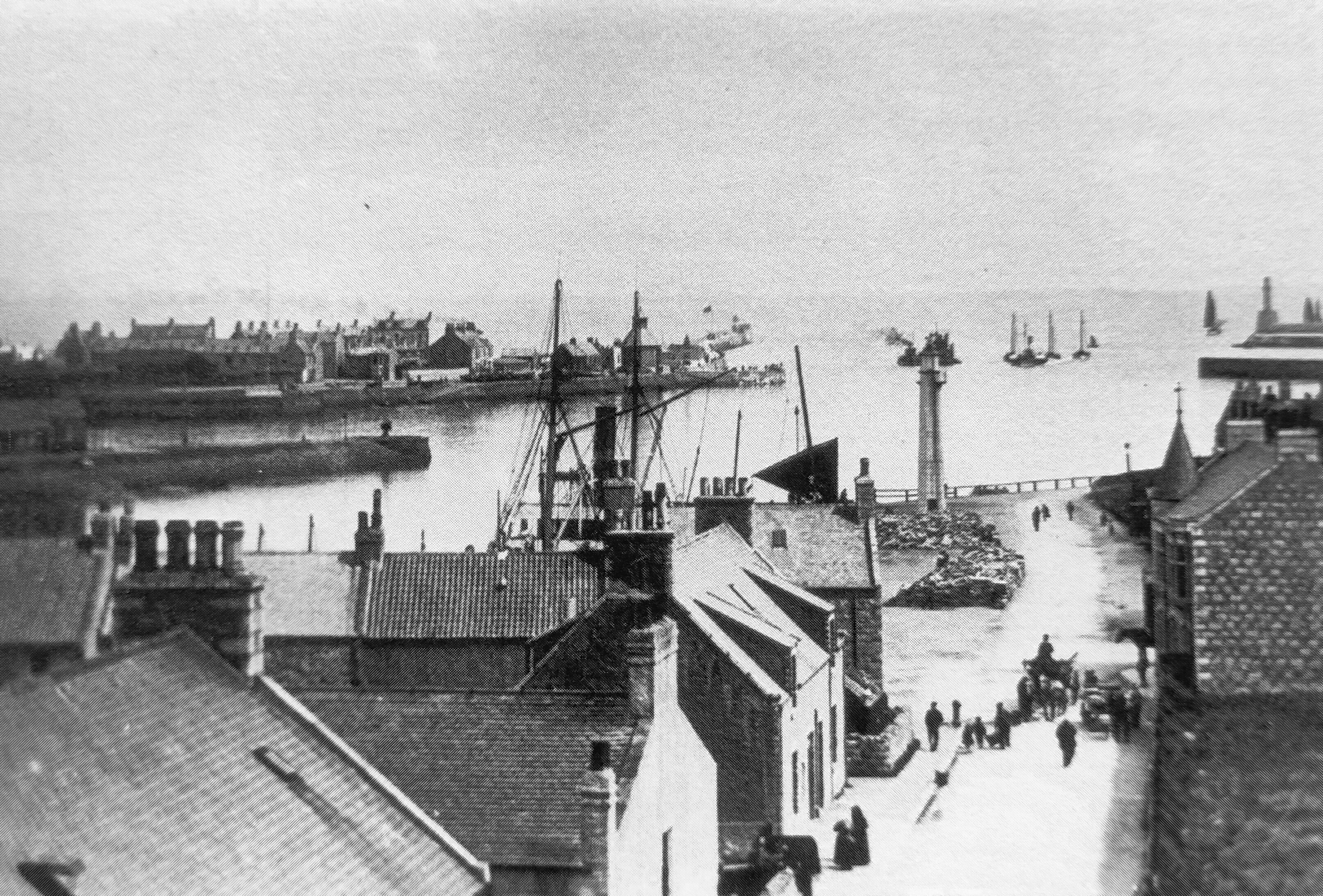
Old Torry, 1880, largely demolished in 1974 to expand the harbour for the oil industry.

Over time development in the area became focussed on what became known as 'Old Torry', a fishing community on the south bank of the River Dee, to the north of present day Sinclair Road.

In 1842 the Harbour authorities built two leading lights in Old Torry to guide ships safely into Aberdeen Harbour. They are still working today.

Some of Old Torry's oldest houses were lost when the River Dee was diverted to enable the first major expansion of Aberdeen Harbour in 1871, a development which enabled the construction of the Queen Victoria Bridge, opened in 1881.

Torry was historically part of the parish of Nigg in Kincardineshire. In 1891 Torry was incorporated into the burgh of Aberdeen. Torry remained part of the county of Kincardineshire for certain judicial functions until 1899, when the city of Aberdeen was made a county of itself.

In 1929 the Department of Scientific and Industrial Research set up the Torry Research Station here. Under the leadership of George Adam Reaythe station researched how better to preserve fish to mitigate the loss of thousands of tons of fish annually through decay. In 1937 Reay's role was became that Director of the station. Torry freshness was introduced as a measurable quality standard in 1953.

In the 1970s North Sea oil and gas was discovered offshore and there was a rush to develop Aberdeen's infrastructure to suit the industry's demands. Shell proposed to demolish Old Torry in order to construct harbour-side storage for oil and gas. Aberdeen City Council approved plans the plans by 31 votes to 3. The matter went to public enquiry but was approved by the UK Government. The houses were bought by compulsory purchase, and in 1974 Old Torry was demolished. Today the site is called the 'Torry Marine Base', part of Aberdeen Harbour.

In 2017 former residents successfully crowdfunded for an information board commemorating Old Torry.

In the 20th century New or Upper Torry developed to the south of Old Torry, moving the centre of modern Torry away from the river and up the hillside.

== Land use and economy ==
Torry remains famous for its fishing community and still has a number of fishing businesses operating close to the Dee as well as the Fisheries Research Laboratory in Victoria Road.

Torry has traditionally been seen as an area of low-cost housing. This has attracted students and more recently migrants from Central and Eastern Europe, particularly Poland. In June 2006, a Polish shop opened on Victoria Road to cater for the influx of new workers and their families to the Aberdeen area.

The median property sale in 2004 was £34,000 compared to £91,000 in the Aberdeen City area.

Unemployment in Torry is estimated at around 3 percent which is high for the city. Torry is a neighbourhood highlighted as a priority area for Aberdeen's Community Regeneration Strategy. The population of Torry in 2011 was 10,465.

The 18-hole Balnagask golf course offers panoramic city views from the east side of Torry, as well as a vantage point for viewing the dolphins which frequently visit the harbour mouth area.

== Bridges ==
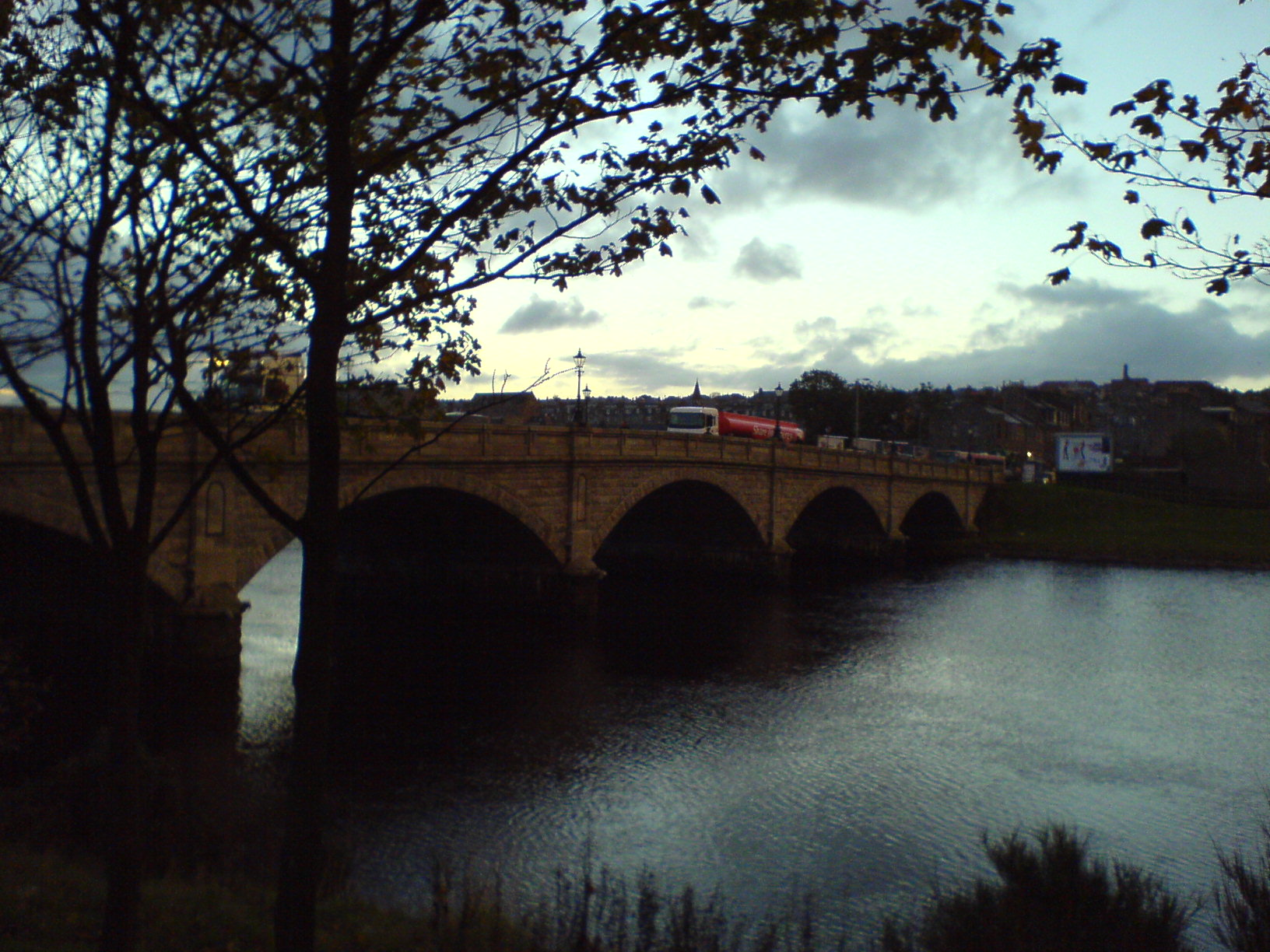
Victoria Bridge, Torry

Today, Torry is connected to the north bank of the Dee and the centre of Aberdeen by three bridges.

Leading most directly to the centre of Torry, the Queen Victoria Bridge was completed in 1887, following a ferry disaster in 1876 which claimed the lives of 32 people returning from a visit to the Bay of Nigg. The bridge also has facilities for carrying water and gas services across the river.

To the west of the Victoria Bridge lie the Queen Elizabeth Bridge of 1983, and the narrow Wellington Suspension Bridge. The suspension bridge was designed by Captain Samuel Brown and opened in 1831, replacing the Craiglug ferry. Refurbished in 1930, the category A listed building was closed to vehicular traffic in 1984 and to pedestrians in March 2002. Aberdeen City Council engineers have strengthened the bridge, and have reopened it as a public footbridge.

== Garden Suburb ==
Nicholas J. Williams writes that the transfer, in 1919, of "responsibility for working-class housing from the private sector to the council" meant a vast improvement in housing quality in Aberdeen. The first such houses were built at Torry, and a variety of possible plans were put on show at the Art Gallery in April, 1919. They were the work of the architects William Kelly and Harbourne McLennan and the surveyor John Gordon. The following year it was announced that the building of the "initial instalment" of a proposed 500 houses was well under way. Earth from the excavated roadways around the housing development was being placed on top of the central hill summit, "and a mound, from which a complete view of the city will be obtained, is being built." Ronald W. McDonald, in his history of the area, writes that the "area grew steadily between 1919 and 1933" and suggests that the "hub" of the area was the Torry Intermediate School, "opened on the 29th August 1927, with 305 pupils."

== Landmarks and historic buildings ==
The formerly fortified Torry Battery – last used defensively during the Second World War – is now a scheduled monument, protected as a place of historical interest of national importance. Close by are the remains of a rocket-propelled life-saving apparatus station (supplanted as a rescue system by the development of helicopters), and further along the shore road are a disused but preserved foghorn and Robert Stevenson-designed lighthouse.

The ruin of St. Fittick's Church was built in 1199 and the key is available from the Starter's Hut near the Balnagask golf clubhouse; the graveyard has remains of many who perished in the Wreck of the Oscar (1 April 1813), and a road in Torry is named Oscar Road.

Balnagask Motte, near North Balnagask Road, may be the remains of the earthen mound which would have been the base of an early wooden castle, but it has never been the subject of archaeological investigation.

== Notable people ==
- Annie Lennox, singer-songwriter formerly of Eurythmics
- Thomas Scott Sutherland, architect
