= Aberdeen Guild Street railway station =

Disused railway station in Aberdeen, Scotland

Aberdeen Guild Street
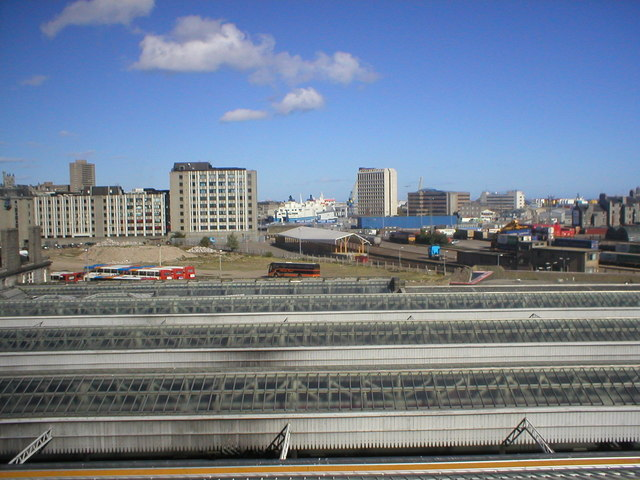
- Site of the station in 2004, with Aberdeen railway station in the foreground.

General information
- Location: Aberdeen; Scotland; United Kingdom
- Coordinates: 57.1449°N 2.0965°W

Other information
- Status: Disused

History
- Original company: Aberdeen Railway

Key dates
- 1854: Opened
- 1867: Closed
Location

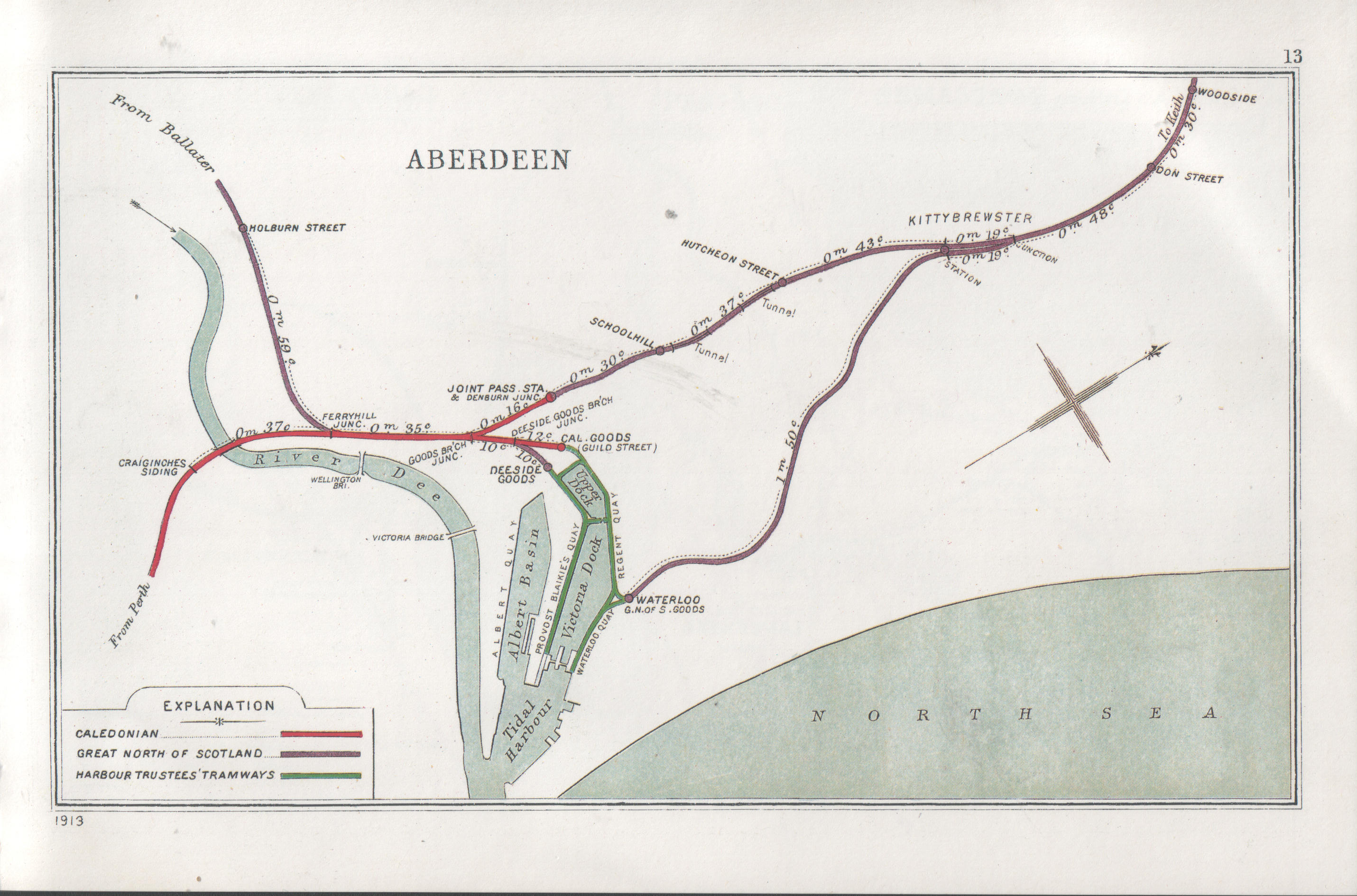
A 1913 Railway Clearing House Junction Diagram showing railways in the vicinity of Aberdeen (present station shown here as JOINT PASS. STA.)

Aberdeen Guild Street railway station was the former terminus of the Aberdeen Railway.

This station opened to passengers on 2 August 1854 as the new terminus of the Aberdeen Railway, replacing the former temporary terminus at Ferryhill. It also served as the terminus of the Deeside Railway, which had an agreement to use the station and the portion of track between it and Ferryhill junction. At the time, the southern terminus of the Great North of Scotland Railway was at Kittybrewster and the two termini were connected by a tramway through the harbour. The Great North of Scotland Railway was extended in 1856 bringing the new terminus, Aberdeen Waterloo closer to the city centre, but still not connected to the Guild Street station.

On 4 November 1867 the Denburn Valley Line and the new Joint station was opened. This connected the Great North of Scotland Railway and the Aberdeen Railway, which had since become the Scottish North Eastern Railway, which was in turn absorbed by the Caledonian Railway. Guild Street station subsequently became a goods yard. A large goods shed was built in 1900 which remained standing after the goods lines within it closed, subsequently being used for car parking. It was demolished in 2002. The site of the former goods shed is now occupied by Aberdeen bus station.

The remaining freight activity ceased in 2007 and was transferred to Raith's Farm (on the Aberdeen–Inverness line) and Craiginches depots. The site was used for Union Square, which opened in 2009.

Preceding station	Historical railways	Following station
Cove Bay; Line open, station closed	Aberdeen Railway	Terminus
Ruthrieston; Line and station closed	Deeside Railway	Terminus
