= CityConnect WIFI =

Wireless Internet network in York, Aberdeen, and Newport

CityConnect WIFI is a Municipal wireless network brand name currently in operation in the cities of York, England; Aberdeen, Scotland; and Newport, Wales. It is run by Pinacl Solutions, who seeks to turn the entire connected area into a Wireless Access Zone and ultimately make the internet a universal service. To cover large parts of the cities, a wireless mesh network has been deployed, relaying the wireless Wi-Fi signal of hundreds of routers mounted commonly to poles, lamp-posts and buildings. Pinacl works closely with City of York Council and Aberdeen City Council and as such, Pinacl acts as a wireless internet service provider.

== Overview ==
CityConnect WIFI first launched in 2014 across York City Centre when it was rolled out across the city centre and park and ride terminals. Coverage was later expanded across the University of York. This network sees around 2,000 users per day. Aberdeen CityConnect was later launched across 31 publicly accessible Council buildings in the Granite City and similarly in the City of Newport, with FREE public available in over 50 Council buildings. A separate concession based network was deployed across parts of the City Centre including Upper Dock St, Corn St, Skinner St, Riverfront Theatre, train station, information station, Cambrian Road, Newport Market and the bus station.

== York ==
Pinacl, working in partnership with the City of York Council, started trials of public Wi-Fi beginning 2013, which was later rolled out permanently. This initially covered Coney Street, the main shopping street in York. Wi-Fi range was later expanded into other streets, allowing for continual use with connected devices relaying signals to the nearest router, for seamless connectivity whilst on the move. Wi-Fi range has since been expanded to cover the entire of York City Centre, the 6 Park and Ride sites, 14 council run libraries and 41 council owned buildings. WiFi within the city centre is split into 15 'Network Zones' relaying signals to the previous and next router in the sequence.

CityConnect WIFI Zones

- Zone 1 – 1 Bridge St Wall mount Lamp
- Zone 1 – 13 Bridge St Wall mount Lamp
- Zone 1 – 39 Micklegate Wall mount Lamp
- Zone 2 – Station Rise (West Offices)
- Zone 2 – Cedar Court Lamppost
- Zone 2 – 2 Rougier St Lamppost
- Zone 2 – Tanners Moat Lamppost
- Zone 3 – Stn Rise/Stn Ave CCTV Pole
- Zone 3 – Royal York Hotel Lamppost
- Zone 3 – York Stn Lamppost
- Zone 4 – 1 Museum St Lamppost
- Zone 4 – Museum St/Lendl Lamppost
- Zone 4 – Duncombe Place lamppost
- Zone 4 – Minster Yard (Left of Minster) lamppost
- Zone 4 – Minster Yard (Right of Minster) lamppost
- Zone 5 – 1 Davygate CCTV Pole
- Zone 5 – 14 Blake St Wall mount Lamp
- Zone 5 – 15 Davygate Wall mount Lamp
- Zone 5 – 26 Davygate Wall mount Lamp
- Zone 6 – 1 Parliament St CCTV Pole
- Zone 6 – 8 Parliament St Wall mount Lamp
- Zone 6 – 15 Parliament St Wall mount Lamp
- Zone 6 – 21 Davygate CCTV Camera mount
- Zone 7 – 1 Coopergate CCTV Pole
- Zone 7 – 6 Nessgate Wall mount Lamp
- Zone 7 – 1 Nessgate (Wall mount Lamp)
- Zone 7 – 4 Spurriergate CCTV Camera mount
- Zone 7 – 13 Market St Wall mount Lamp
- Zone 8 – Mansion House Rooftop
- Zone 8 – 12 Coney St Wall mount Lamp
- Zone 8 – 15 Coney St Wall mount Lamp
- Zone 8 – 23 Coney St Wall mount Lamp
- Zone 8 – 22 Lendl Wall mount Lamp
- Zone 8 – 1 Stonegate Wall mount Lamp
- Zone 9 – 6 Grape Lane Wall mount Bracket
- Zone 9 – 54 Low Petergate Wall mount Lamp
- Zone 9 – 2 Minster Yard Lamppost
- Zone 10 – 17 Back Swinegate CCTV Camera mount
- Zone 10 – 14 Swinegate CCTV Camera Mount
- Zone 10 – 28 Stonegate CCTV Camera Mount
- Zone 10 – 1 Kings Square CCTV Camera Mount
- Zone 11 – 65 Goodramsgate Wall mount Lamp
- Zone 11 – 34 Goodramsgate Lamppost
- Zone 11 – 27 Goodramsgate Wall mount Lamp
- Zone 11 – Deangate Lamppost
- Zone 12 – Silver St Wall mount Lamp
- Zone 12 – 10 Newgate Wall mount Lamp
- Zone 12 – 47 Shambles Wall mount Lamp
- Zone 12 – 13 Shambles Wall mount Lamp
- Zone 12 – 23 Shambles Wall mount Lamp
- Zone 13 – 1 St Saviourgate CCTV Pole
- Zone 13 – 20 Pavement Lamppost
- Zone 13 – 10 Pavement Wall mount Lamp
- Zone 14 – Museum Gardens

== Aberdeen ==
Free Wi-Fi is available across 30 publicly-accessible Aberdeen City Council buildings, as part of the Accelerate Aberdeen programme. It was done in partnership with Pinacl Solutions and in the same technical style as in York.

Aberdeen City Connect is available in 17 libraries, nine community and learning centres, Aberdeen Maritime Museum, Adventure Aberdeen and Marischal College. It is aimed at widening access to internet-based services across the city, as well as helping to address digital divide and social inclusion issues. In addition, Aberdeen City Connect is also available in 17 NHS Grampian Hospitals.

Free public Wi-Fi is available in the below locations:

=== Libraries ===
- Central Library
- Airyhall Library
- Bridge of Don Library
- Bucksburn Library
- Cornhill Library
- Cove Library
- Culter Library
- Cults Library & Learning Centre
- Dyce Library
- Ferryhill Library
- Kaimhill Library
- Kincorth Library
- Mastrick Library
- Northfield Library
- Tillydrone Library & Learning Centre
- Torry Library
- Woodside Library

=== Community Centres ===
- Cummings Park Community Centre
- Dyce Community Learning Centre
- Froghall Community Hall
- Lord Provost Henry E Rae Community Centre
- Rosemount Community Centre
- Tillydrone Library & Learning Centre
- Torry Sports & Learning Centre
- Tullos Community Learning Centre
- Woodside Fountain Community Centre

=== Other Venues ===
- Aberdeen Maritime Museum
- Adventure Aberdeen
- Marischal College Customer Access Point

=== Hospitals ===
- Aberdeen Royal Infirmary
- Aberdeen Maternity Hospital
- Royal Aberdeen Children's Hospital
- Woodend Hospital
- Royal Cornhill Hospital
- Aboyne Hospital
- Chalmers Hospital
- Fleming Hospital
- Fraserburgh Hospital
- Glen O' Dee Hospital
- Insch War Memorial Hospital
- Inverurie Hospital
- Jubilee Hospital
- Kincardine Hospital
- Peterhead Hospital
- Seafield Hospital
- Stephen Hospital
- Turner Memorial Hospital

== Newport ==
NewportCityConnect provides users with unlimited free Wi-Fi access across city centre locations including Upper Dock St, Corn St, Skinner St, Riverfront Theatre, Railway Station, Information Station, Cambrian Road, Newport Market and the Bus Station.

Visitors and residents can access NewportCityConnect from any wireless enabled device.

The network has been designed to provide sufficient bandwidth to support streaming services such as BBC iPlayer. Pinacl created the CityConnect brand specifically for public Wi-Fi networks and solutions have been deployed for Aberdeen City Council, Stockport City Council and property development giants, British Land. Small retailers have also opted for CityConnect solutions to enhance their existing network with a social media Wi-Fi overlay.
