= Aberdeen City Centre Masterplan =

Aberdeen City Centre Masterplan is a project by Aberdeen City Council which aims to improve the city of Aberdeen.

== History ==
In March 2015, the first details on the project were released, and initial public consultations opened. The proposals were designed by BDP and priced at £280 million in 2015. The project was approved by councillors on 24 June 2015. In November 2016, it was announced that the council had raised £307 million through issuing public bonds, and that this would go towards the funding of the masterplan, the P&J Live, and other infrastructure projects.

== Proposals ==
The initial proposals included the partial pedestrianisation of Union Street and a "station gateway", creating a pedestrian link between Union Street and Aberdeen railway station. Proposals announced in 2016 included a new area called Queen's Square, created through the demolition of the police headquarters on Queen Street.
