= George Street, Aberdeen =

Street in Aberdeen, Scotland, United Kingdom

Coordinates: 57.15588°N 2.10836°W

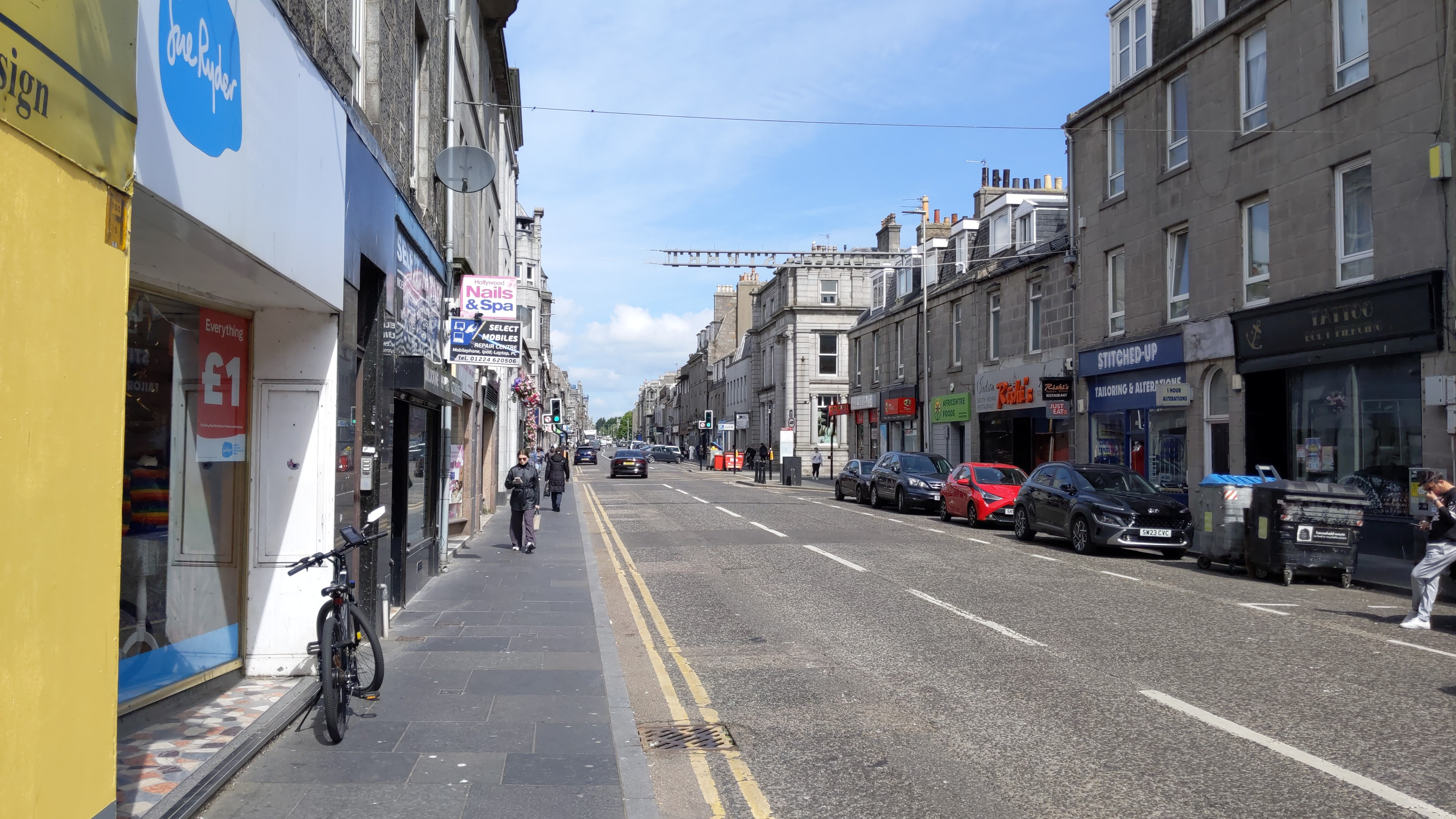
View of George Street, Aberdeen

George Street is a street in the city of Aberdeen, Scotland.

At its northern end it meets the area of Kittybrewster and connects to the A96 road. Running south and slightly east, George Street heads towards the city centre. Dominated by mixed-use development there are a variety of commercial units serving the area.

== Commerce ==
Commercial units range from convenience stores to furniture shops, with a veritable melting pot of multi-cultural offerings from the Asian and European continents in the form of restaurants, cafés, takeaways and barbers. Towards the southern half of George Street independent food establishments have increased their presence over the past few years with a choice of daytime and evening food offerings.

Several quality tattoo parlours offer their services and several pubs also operate in the area, with more pubs branching off into the side streets.

The southern end of the street has been pedestrianised alongside where there was once an extensive collection of buildings owned by the Northern Co-operative Society. These were demolished and replaced with Norco House, which was occupied by the department store John Lewis until August 2021. The building then housed a COVID-19 vaccination clinic from then until June 2023 when the clinic relocated to the nearby Bon Accord Centre, leaving the building vacant. Construction is taking place as of June 2024.

Always a major shopping street, George Street once crossed, at its southern end, the city's Schoolhill, and thence led to the main thoroughfare of Union Street. However, the late 20th Century development of the Bon Accord Centre covered over the end of the street where the roadway once continued (as St. Nicholas Street) to Union Street.

Future commercial development of the southern end of George Street is planned along with further development of the Bon Accord Centre. A glass roof and facade improvements have been conditionally approved by Aberdeen City Council planners for the south end of George Street, along with plans for shops, a 170-bed hotel and 50 residential flats.
