= Aberdeen Kittybrewster railway station =

Disused railway station in Aberdeen, Scotland

Aberdeen Kittybrewster
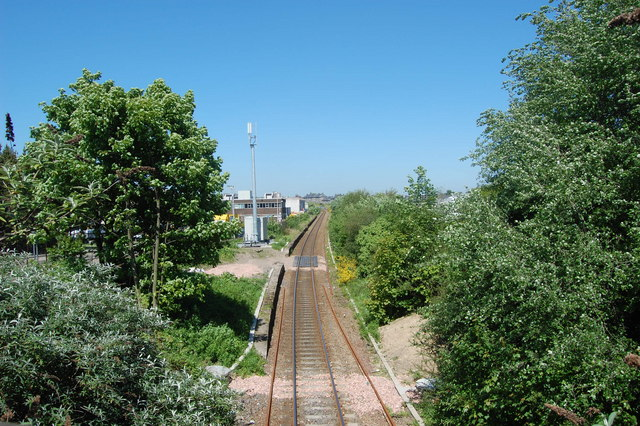
- The site of the station in 2009

General information
- Location: Aberdeen, Aberdeen; Scotland
- Coordinates: 57.1603°N 2.1136°W

Other information
- Status: Disused

History
- Original company: Great North of Scotland Railway
- Pre-grouping: GNoSR

Key dates
- 20 September 1854: Station opened
- 1 April 1856: Station closed and replaced by Aberdeen Waterloo and Kittybrewster
Location

Aberdeen Kittybrewster station opened on 20 September 1854 to serve the Great North of Scotland Railway main line to Keith. It closed to passengers in 1856 once Aberdeen Waterloo and Kittybrewster (on the link to the Aberdeen Railway) opened. The track remains in use as a freight siding for the docks.

The station was 19 chains (380 m) south of the junction between the main line and the branch line to the docks, near where the A96 Powis Terrace now crosses the line.
