= Denburn Valley Line =

Railway line in the United Kingdom

Coordinates: 57.15368°N 2.11060°W

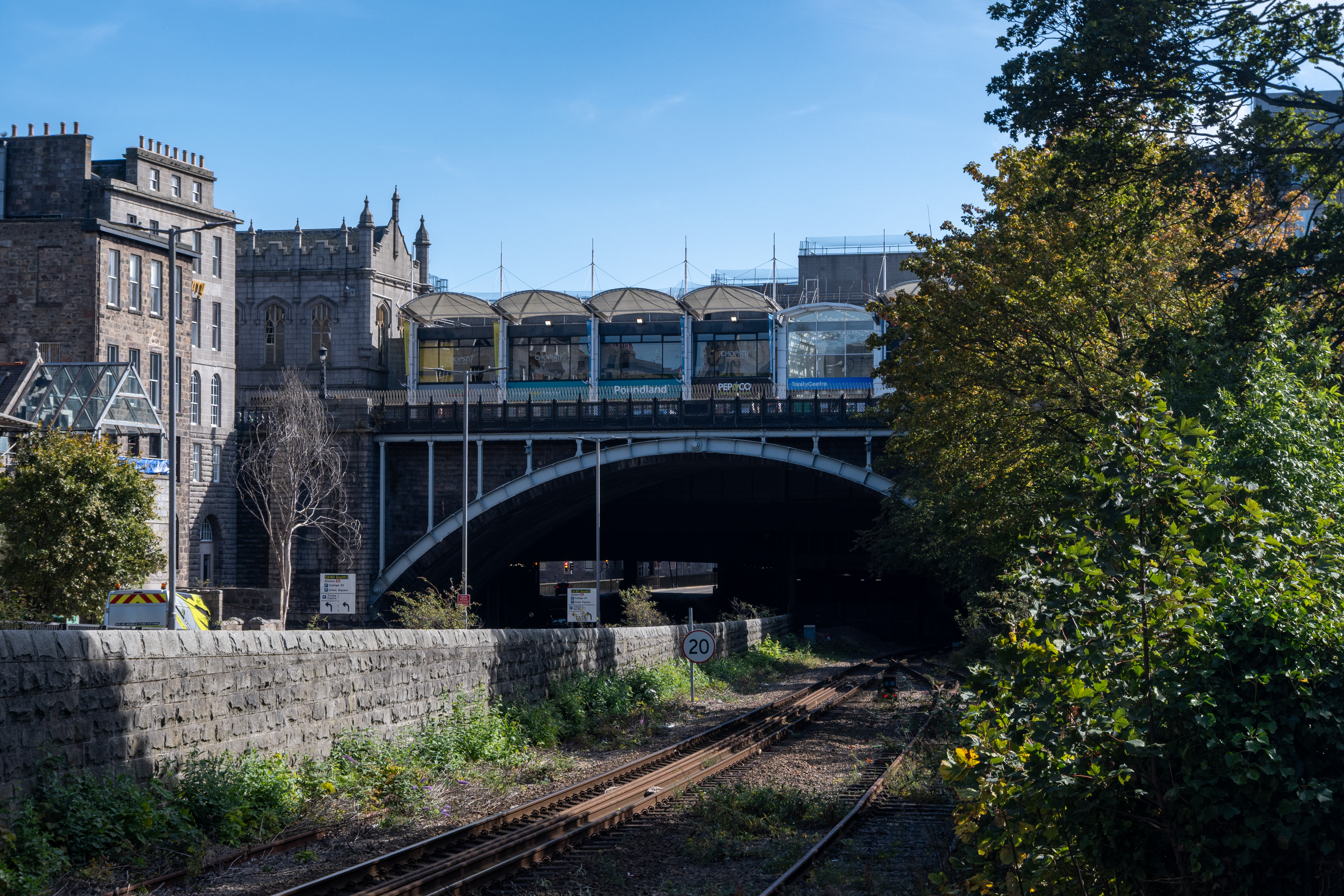
The railway passing underneath Union Bridge

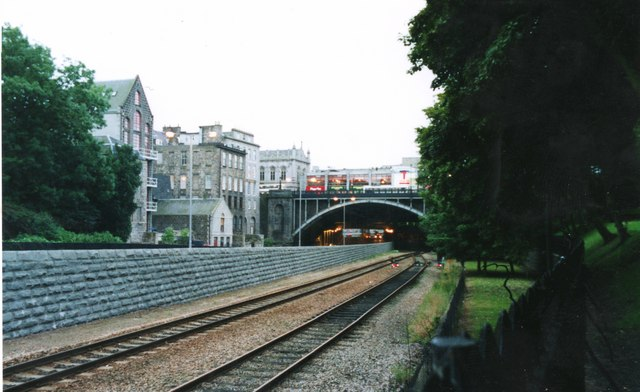
Union Bridge viewed from the lower side of Union Terrace Gardens

The Denburn Valley Line was a connecting line constructed to connect the northern end of the Aberdeen Railway and Deeside Railway to the southern end of the Great North of Scotland Railway mainline.

== History ==
The line was built over a former stream – the den burn. It also passed underneath the existing Union Bridge. It opened on 4 November 1867. The project included the "joint station", a new through-station, and two smaller stations: Schoolhill and Hutcheon Street. The adjacent Union Terrace Gardens opened in the 1870s.

Hutcheon Street and Schoolhill stations closed in 1937 as the local cross-city service was discontinued.

== Present day ==
The line is still in use today as the end of the Dundee–Aberdeen line and the start of the Aberdeen–Inverness line. The joint station is now the only railway station in central Aberdeen. The Trinity Centre was built over part of the line.
