= Saint Nicholas Centre =

Saint Nicholas Centre may refer to:

- A section of the Aberdeen Bon Accord Centre
- A shopping centre located on Sutton High Street
