= Trinity Shopping Centre =

Trinity Shopping Centre may refer to:

- Trinity Centre, Aberdeen
- Trinity Leeds
