= Aberdeen Ferryhill railway station =

Disused railway station in Ferryhill, Aberdeen

Aberdeen Ferryhill

General information
- Location: Ferryhill, Aberdeen; Scotland
- Coordinates: 57.1344°N 2.0978°W

Other information
- Status: Disused

History
- Original company: Aberdeen Railway

Key dates
- 1850: Opened
- 1854: Closed
Location

Aberdeen Ferryhill railway station was the temporary terminus of the Aberdeen Railway and the first railway station to serve the city of Aberdeen. Regular passenger service began on 1 April 1850. As the station is located some distance south of the city centre, omnibuses and luggage vans were employed to complete the journey into the city. In 1853, the Deeside Railway was opened, which also used Ferryhill as a terminus. In 1854, the railway was extended and a new terminus, Aberdeen Guild Street railway station, was opened on 2 August. This station was located closer to the city centre, approximately where the present-day Aberdeen railway station (joint station) was later built.

The station was situated to the west of Wellington Suspension Bridge.

| Preceding station | Historical railways | Following station |
|---|---|---|
| Cove Bay; Line open, station closed | Aberdeen Railway | Terminus |
| Cults; Line and station closed | Deeside Railway | Terminus |
