= Bon Accord Centre =

Bon Accord

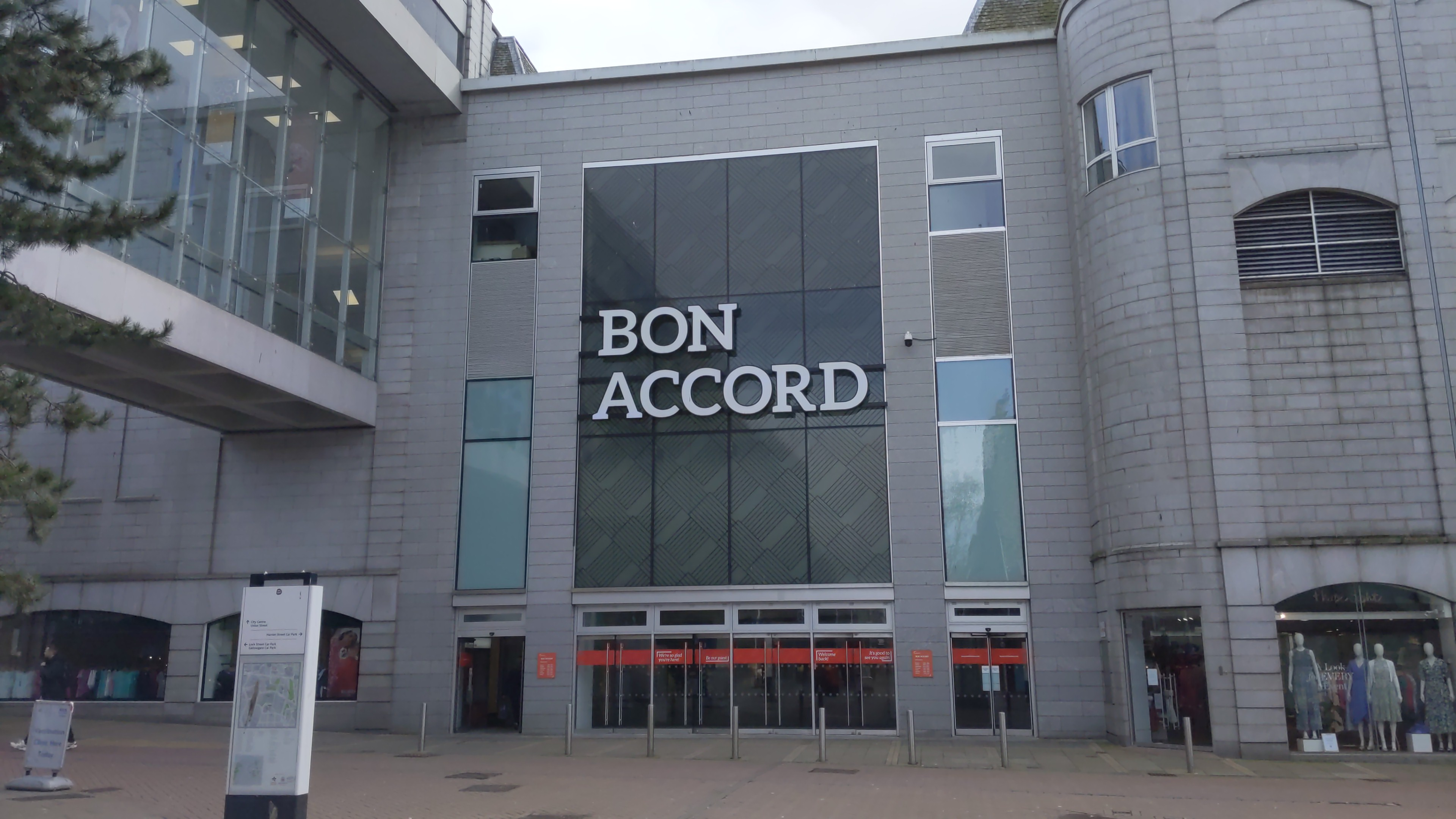
- Location: Aberdeen, Scotland
- Coordinates: 57°8′55″N 2°5′59″W
- Opened: 3 October 1985 (St. Nicholas) 3 April 1990 (Bon Accord)
- Owner: Aberdeen Shopping Centre Limited
- Num. of stores: 40
- Num. of anchor tenants: 2 (M&S, Next)
- Floor area: 630,000 sq ft (59,000 m^{2})
- Floors: 3
- Parking: 6 floors
- Website: bonaccordaberdeen.com

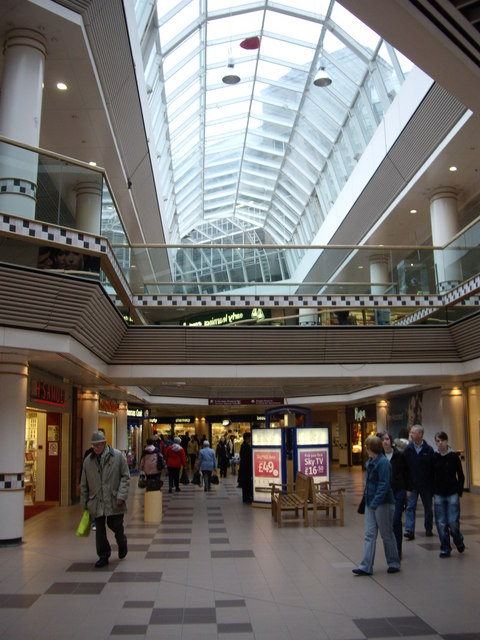
Interior of the Bon Accord centre in 2009

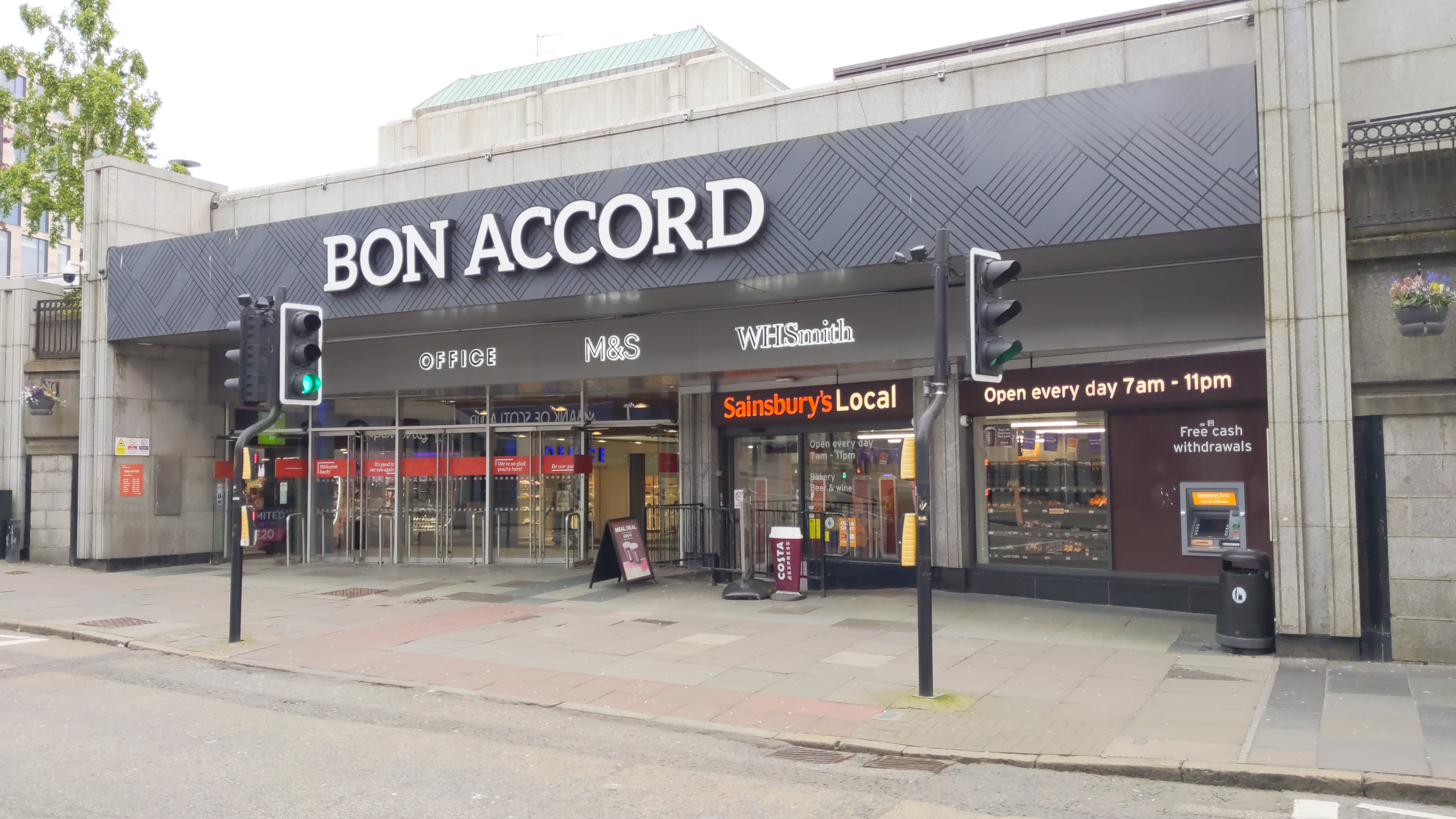
Entrance to the former St. Nicholas centre, now branded Bon Accord

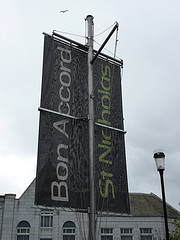
Former Bon Accord & St Nicholas flags

The Bon Accord centre is the second-largest shopping centre complex in Aberdeen, Scotland and serves a large catchment area including the city and surrounding Aberdeenshire.

The centre was constructed as two separate entities: the St. Nicholas Shopping Centre in 1985 and the adjacent Bon Accord Shopping Centre in 1990. Since opening, they have formed one of the most dense retailing areas in Aberdeen, having merged in the early 2000s. The two centres were co-branded until 2018 when the St. Nicholas name was dropped in favour of a unified brand across the property.

== Layout ==
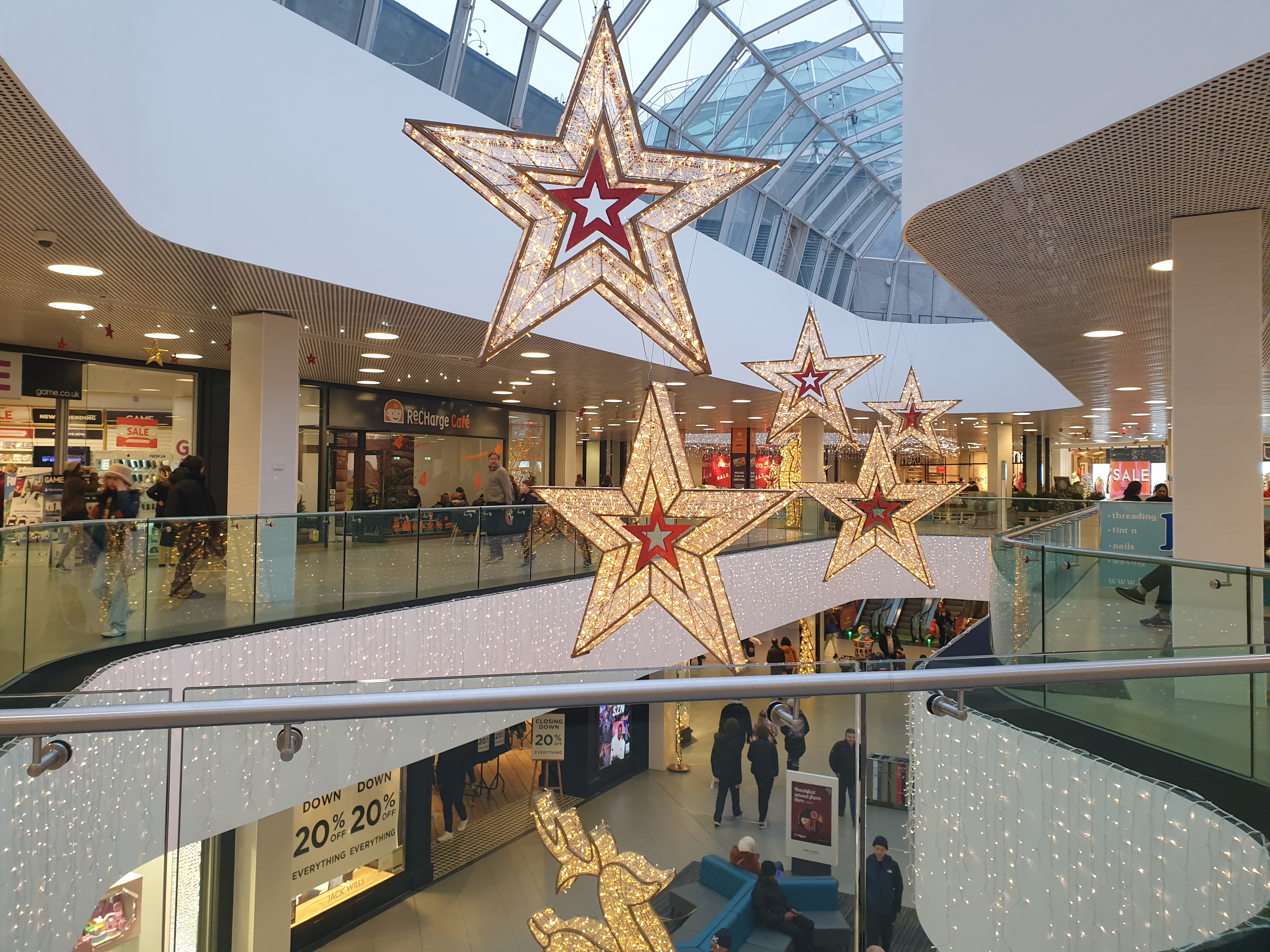

The centre is split into two buildings which effectively join the shopping streets of George Street and Union Street. It has three floors extending to 630,000 sq ft (59,000 m^{2}). Parking is attached with around 1,700 spaces. The Bon Accord Centre was built in a serpentine shape to maximize shop unit frontage and is covered by a barrel vaulted glazed roof with a 90 ft (27 m) high glazed dome. The former St. Nicholas has a more dated, straight-through design with a mostly concrete urban open space on its roof, along with little-used first-floor entrances to some of the businesses.

The northern entrance of the centre is located across the street from a former John Lewis & Partners department store, and the store is connected to the centre via a bridge on the first floor. The John Lewis department store opened on 4 October 1989 and closed in 2020. The bottom floor of the John Lewis department store was subsequently used as a vaccination centre.

== History ==
Work began on the St. Nicholas centre on 26 October 1983, when the foundation stone was laid by the then Lord Provost of the city, Alexander C Collie. During construction, two coin hoards were uncovered, amassing around 7000 coins valued at the time at £35,000. The centre was officially opened on 3 October 1985 by Lord Provost Henry Rae with total retail space covering 96,000 sq ft (8,900 m^{2}). The first store, Miss Selfridge, opened its doors three months earlier on 4 July 1985. The Bon Accord centre opened five years later on 3 April 1990.

In 2003, British Land purchased the entirety of the St. Nicholas centre for £31 million, previously 40% owned by BL Universal (a joint venture between British Land and GUS plc.) with the remaining 60% held by a pension scheme. On 18 March 2004, British Land and Land Securities (owner of the Bon Accord centre) announced they had formed a 50/50 joint venture, the "Scottish Retail Property Limited Partnership", bringing together the two centres under one management. Shortly after, the newly unified centre started using the dual-branded name Bon Accord St. Nicholas Shopping Centre.

Many significant brands have been residents of the centre over the years, such as C&A, Primark, and Woolworths, with competition particularly increased with the opening of the nearby Union Square shopping centre in October 2009. Bon Accord and St. Nicholas added several stores in the years that followed, including many brands not previously present in Aberdeen.

On 6 August 2009, Next opened its largest Scottish store (54,000 sq ft (5,000 m^{2})). This includes 300 new car parking spaces (accessed from the current Loch street car park), and a new shop frontage onto the Gallowgate. The store is three times the size of the old stores in the St. Nicholas part of the centre. On 22 August Topshop/Topman opened a new 16,000 sq ft (1,500 m^{2}) store, and River Island also opened an 11,000 sq ft (1,000 m^{2}) store within the old Woolworths and Disney Store units.

In March 2009 a major facelift of the St. Nicholas centre was completed which consisted of new flooring, lighting, and fixtures and fittings to freshen up the dated interior. It also included new doors and light-box signage at both entrances to the centre. The following year, the Bon Accord centre revealed plans for a £6 million upgrade to include giving the 20-year-old centre new entrances on both Schoolhill and George Street as well as a new interior and furniture using a white theme and cleaner lines throughout. The work was completed in 2011.

In December 2010, it was announced by bosses at the centre that the "Bon Appetit" food court in the Bon Accord centre was to close after 21 years due to competition from other shopping centres within Aberdeen. Re-opened in November 2011, the area, now known as "Food Terrace", was re-configured into four larger catering units/restaurants each with internal and external seating out in the shopping centre.

It was announced in 2013 that co-owners British Land and Land Securities were to sell the Bon Accord & St. Nicholas centre. The deal worth £189 million was completed in October 2013 with F&C REIT, now BMO Real Estate Partners, taking control of the centre. By 2018 however, asset management has since passed on to Capreon Limited, on behalf of Aberdeen Shopping Centre Limited.

In late 2018, all reference to the St. Nicholas name was removed resulting in both centres going by the Bon Accord name for the first time. New signage on all entrances was installed reflecting the change.

Management at the centre stated in April 2021 that over twenty shops had closed since the start of the COVID-19 pandemic. In August 2022, the Guernsey-based company that owns the centre went into administration. In April 2023, the centre was purchased by EP Properties for below £10 million.

In January 2024, Marks & Spencer announced that its branch in the Bon Accord Centre will be closed in 2025 and its branch in the nearby Union Square will be extended, absorbing the neighbouring TK Maxx. The store ultimately closed in May 2025.

== Future ==
In July 2021, the council approved plans for a four-screen cinema which would be built inside an existing shop unit in the centre. However, these plans were dropped in favour of revamping the former site of John Lewis into a go-kart track amongst other entertainment amenities.

== See also ==
- Retail in Aberdeen
- Trinity Centre
- Union Square
