= Hutcheon Street railway station =

Disused railway station in Aberdeen, Scotland

Aberdeen Hutcheon Street
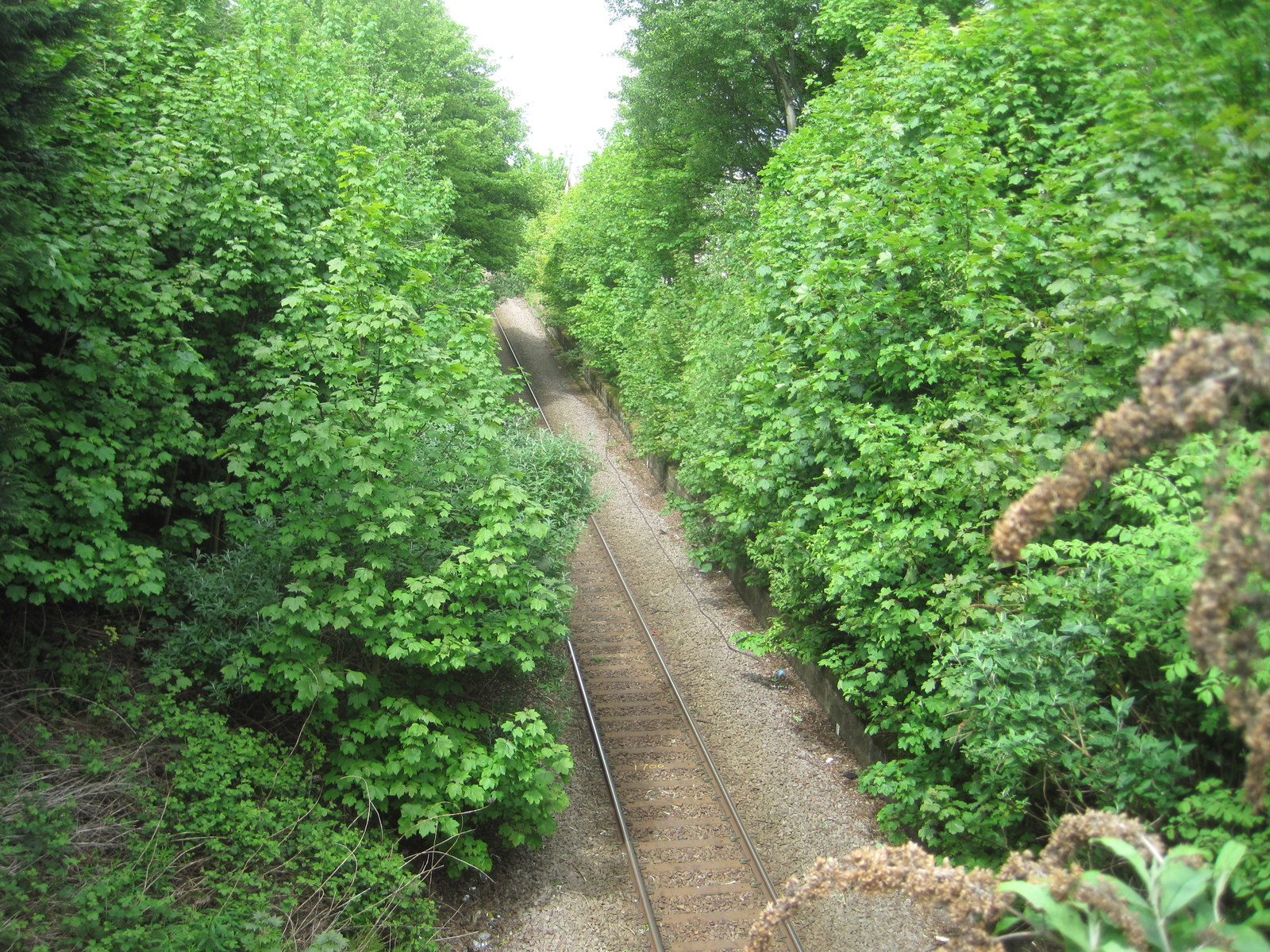
- The site of the station, looking north towards Kittybrewster, in 2017

General information
- Location: Aberdeen; Scotland
- Coordinates: 57.1537°N 2.1109°W
- Grid reference: NJ933069
- Platforms: 2

Other information
- Status: Disused

History
- Original company: Great North of Scotland Railway
- Pre-grouping: Great North of Scotland Railway
- Post-grouping: LNER

Key dates
- 1 December 1887: Opened
- 5 April 1937: Closed
Location

Aberdeen Hutcheon Street railway station served Aberdeen, Scotland from 1887 to 1937 on the Denburn Valley Line.

== History ==
The station opened on 1 December 1887 by the Great North of Scotland Railway. It closed to both passengers and goods traffic on 5 April 1937.

Preceding station	Historical railways	Following station
Schoolhill; Line open, station closed	Great North of Scotland Railway; Denburn Valley Railway	Kittybrewster; Line open, station closed
