= Schoolhill railway station =

Former railway station in Scotland

Coordinates: 57.148°N 2.105°W

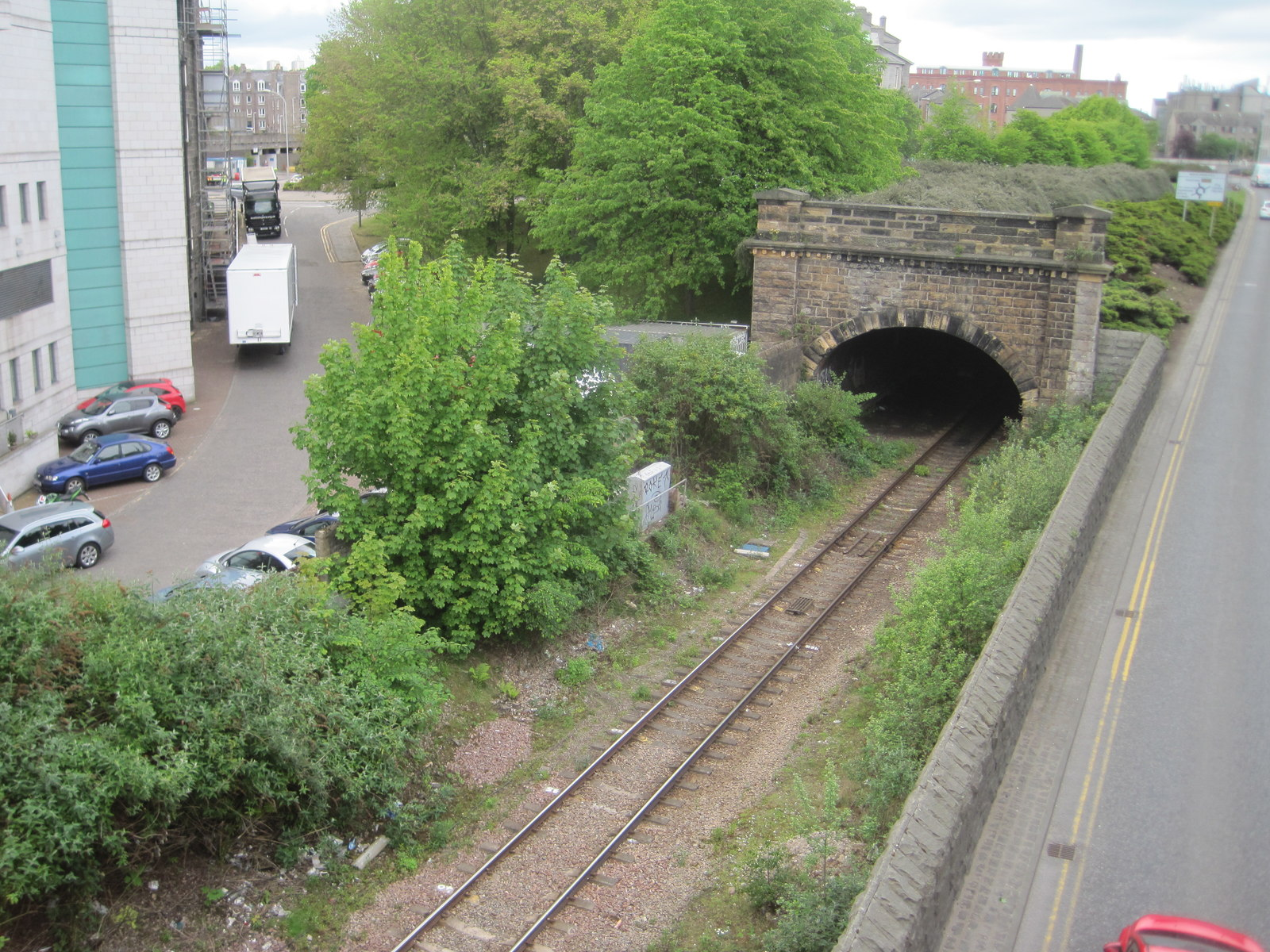
The site of the station in 2017

Schoolhill Railway Station was a railway station in the city of Aberdeen, Scotland. The station was closed on 5 April 1937 with the withdrawal of the suburban rail service. The few remains of the station lie adjacent to His Majesty's Theatre's car park. The station formed part of the Denburn Valley Line jointly administered by the Great North of Scotland Railway and Caledonian Railway.

== Rail services ==
Preceding station	National Rail	Following station
Aberdeen	GNoSR / CR Joint; Denburn Valley Line	Hutcheon Street; Line open; Station closed
