= Union Bridge, Aberdeen =

Bridge in Aberdeen, Scotland

Union Bridge
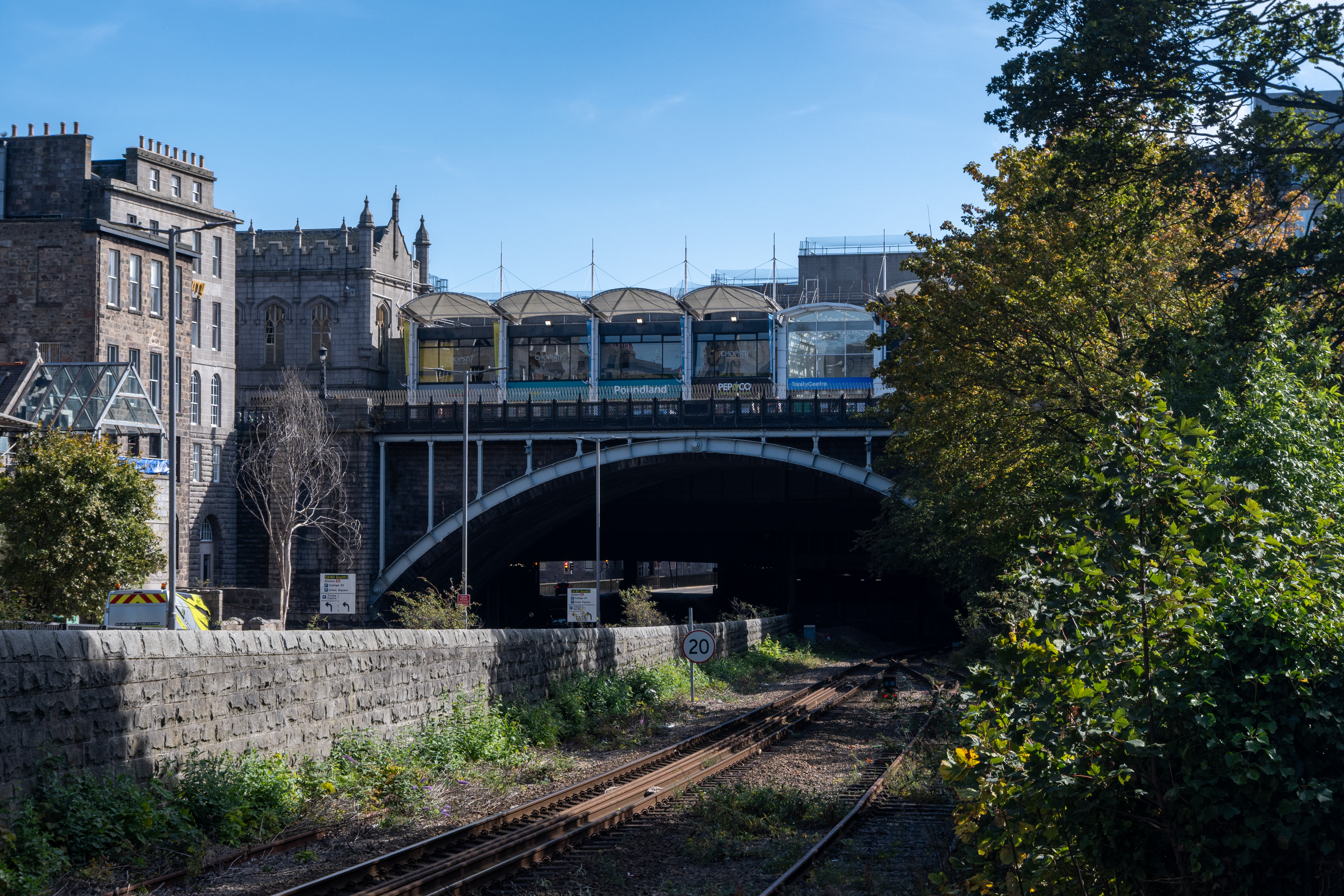
- Bridge above railway line
- Coordinates: 57.14583°N 2.10142°W
- Carries: Road, Pedestrians
- Crosses: Aberdeen–Inverness line
- Locale: Aberdeen

Characteristics
- Material: Granite
- Total length: 130 feet 0 inches (39.62 m)

Listed Building – Category B
- Official name: Union Street Viaduct
- Designated: 12 January 1967
- Reference no.: LB20077

Location
- Interactive map of Union Bridge

Union Bridge is a bridge on Union Street in Aberdeen, Scotland. It is the largest single-span granite bridge in the world, at 130 feet (40 metres). It was built by Thomas Fletcher under some influence from Thomas Telford. It is a Category B listed building with Historic Scotland.

== History ==
Constructed from 1801–05 as part of Union Street under plans suggested by Charles Abercrombie, it was intended to provide an impressive approach into the city from the south (and west); previously the route had been somewhat circuitous. The bridge crosses the Denburn valley, and Union Terrace Gardens. Alongside the gardens are a dual carriageway and single railway track; originally there was a small roadway and considerable railway workings, with the site being a short distance north of Aberdeen railway station.

The bridge was widened in 1908, in a scheme of William Diack, with Benjamin Baker as consultant, shortly before the latter's death. Steel side spans which carry today's pavements were introduced, as were the famous "Kelly's cats", black cast metal leopards which sit along the balustrade. The 'cats' were cast by William Wilson and added to the bridge in 1910. The name Kelly’s Cats is actually a misnomer as only the decorative bronze friezes, installed on the bridge in 1908, were designed by the Aberdeen architect William Kelly.

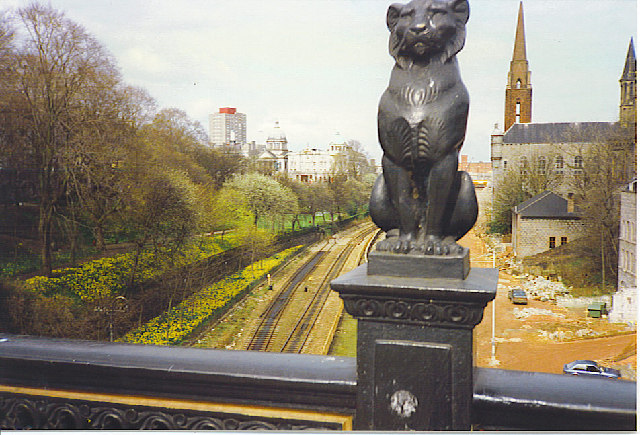
One of "Kelly's Cats"

The southern side of the bridge, including the cats, was hidden, and the view lost, when shops were constructed along it in the 1960s. These later became part of the Trinity Centre. The road and railways continue to run under the shops. The southern balustrade was moved to Duthie Park.

Makeshift fencing was installed along the bridge in 2016 in an attempt to deter people from committing suicide. A permanent barrier was completed as part of works to redevelop the adjacent Union Terrace Gardens.

== See also ==
- List of bridges in Scotland
- Transport in Aberdeen
