= Kittybrewster railway station =

Former railway station in Scotland

Kittybrewster
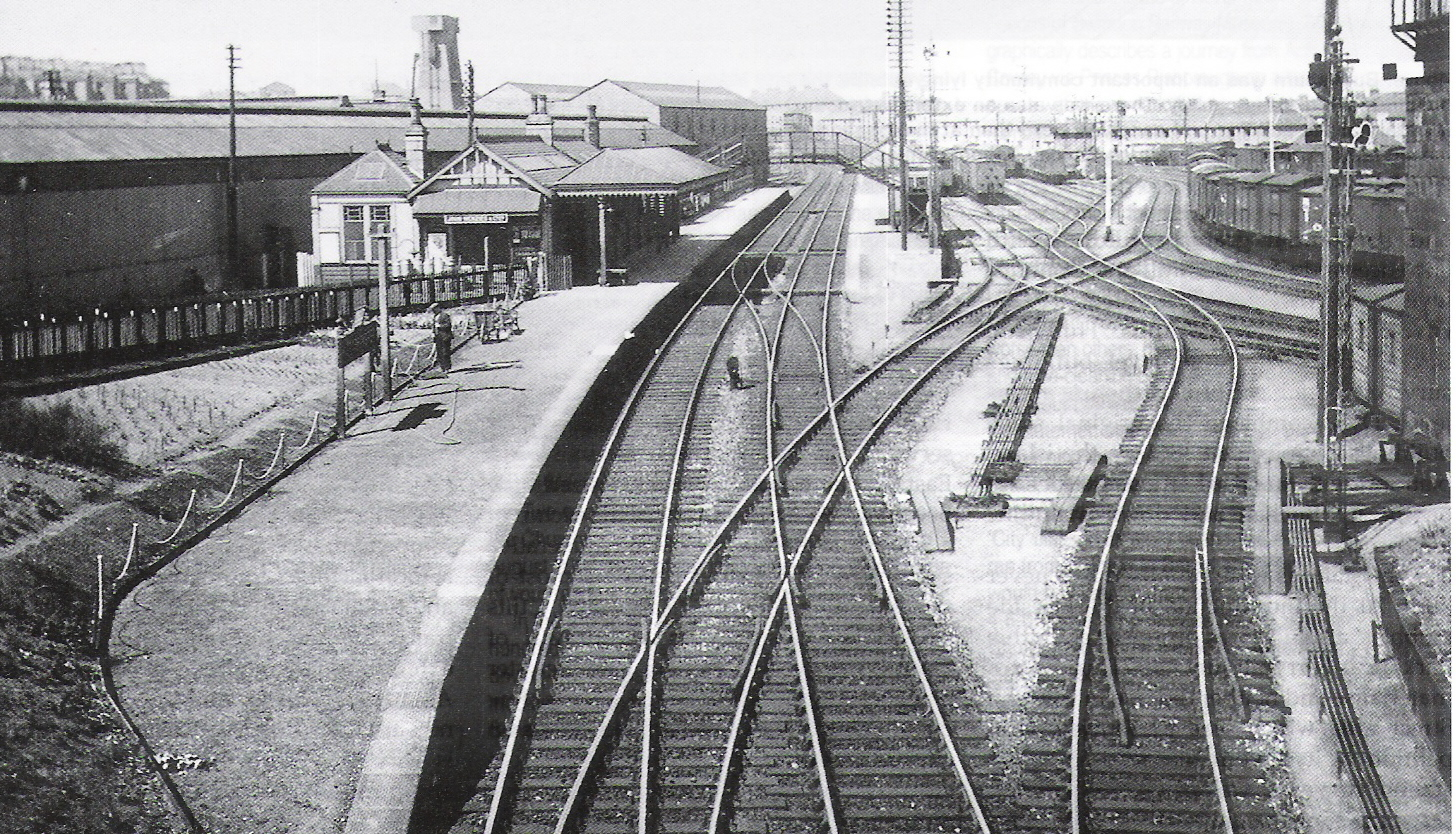
- Kittybrewster station

General information
- Location: Kittybrewster, Aberdeen City; Scotland
- Coordinates: 57.1603°N 2.1136°W

Other information
- Status: Disused

History
- Original company: Great North of Scotland Railway
- Pre-grouping: Great North of Scotland Railway
- Post-grouping: London and North Eastern Railway

Key dates
- 20 September 1854: Opened
- 1 April 1856: Moved when line extended to Aberdeen Waterloo
- 4 November 1867: Moved when Denburn Valley Line to Aberdeen Joint opened
- 6 May 1968: Closed
Location
- Location within Aberdeen City council area

There have been three Kittybrewster railway stations at Kittybrewster, Aberdeen. The first opened in 1854 as a terminus of the Great North of Scotland Railway's (GNoSR) first line to Huntly. This was replaced two years later by a station on a new line to a city terminus at Waterloo. It was replaced again when the Denburn Valley Line to Aberdeen Joint opened in 1867.

The Great North of Scotland Railway amalgamated with other railways to form the London and North Eastern Railway in 1923 and became part of British Railways when the railways were nationalised in 1948. The station was recommended for closure by Dr Beeching's report "The Reshaping of British Railways" and closed on 6 May 1968. The line remains open as the Aberdeen to Inverness Line.

== Stations ==
=== Aberdeen Kittybrewster ===
Aberdeen Kittybrewster opened to the public on 12 September 1854 as the terminus of Great North of Scotland Railway's first line to Huntly. The station had a single platform, with a loop clear of the platform to allow the locomotive to run round the carriages and push them into the station.

On 23 September, the third day after opening to passengers, a collision between two trains at Kittybrewster resulted in the death of a passenger and several serious injuries. The inquiry found that the driver, attempting to make up time after a late start, had over-run previous stations and been approaching the terminus with excessive speed. The driver attempted to select reverse gear to slow the train but had failed to hold on to the lever, which slipped into forward, propelling the train into carriages waiting on the platform. The station staff should not have allowed the carriages to be waiting at the station. The layout at Kittybrewster was altered after the accident.

=== Waterloo ===
The GNoSR sought and obtained powers for a 1 3/4 miles (2.8 km) branch that followed the Aberdeenshire Canal from Kittybrewster to a terminus at Waterloo in the docks. Kittybrewster station was rebuilt with through platforms, and the line was opened to goods traffic on 24 September 1855 and passengers 1 April 1856 and .

=== Joint Station ===
Kittybrewster was again rebuilt with double line railway to a new joint station in Aberdeen. The station and new line opened on 4 November 1867, the stations at Waterloo and Guild Street closing to passengers and becoming goods terminals.

In 1923 the Great North of Scotland Railway amalgamated with other railways to form the London and North Eastern Railway. This was nationalised in 1948, and services provided by British Railways. The station was recommended for closure by Dr Beeching's in his report "The Reshaping of British Railways" and closed on 6 May 1968.

=== Locomotive works ===
The Great North's locomotive works were at Kittybrewster until 1902, when they moved to Inverurie Locomotive Works.

== Services ==
Initially the service was three passenger and one goods train a day, which was increased to five trains a day in 1855 after the GNoSR extended to Keith. This was later reduced to four, until 1858 when the Highland Railway reached Keith, and the service was five trains a day to Keith, with connections or with through carriages on Highland Railway trains to Inverness. This was supplemented by three or four services a day after the Formartine and Buchan Railway opened in 1865 and Peterhead and Fraserburgh were provided with through services from Aberdeen.

In 1887 the service between Aberdeen and Dyce was improved as the number of local trains increased and new stations were opened; by the end of the year there were twelve trains a day, and this eventually became twenty trains a day that took twenty minutes to call at nine stops. As it was Queen Victoria's Golden Jublilee, the trains were initially called the Jubiliees, but became known as the Subbies. However, by the 1930s these services had been losing money for some time as a result of competition from the local buses, and from 5 April 1937 the local services between Aberdeen and Dyce were withdrawn and most of the intermediate stations closed.

The services in summer 1948 included

- 14 trains per day (tpd) to Aberdeen
- 5 tpd to Fraserburgh and Peterhead via Dyce
- 4 tpd to Macduff via Inveramsay
- 5 tpd to Keith, with 3 through services to Inverness. There was a complex system of train portion working between Cairne Junction and Elgin with through working direct via Mulben and via the Coast Line and Craigellachie

There were no Sunday services.

| Preceding station | Historical railways | Following station |
|---|---|---|
| Bucksburn | Great North of Scotland; 1854–1856 | Terminus |
| Bucksburn | Great North of Scotland; 1856–1867 | Aberdeen Waterloo |
| Bucksburn | Great North of Scotland; 1867–1968 | Aberdeen Joint |
| Hutcheon Street | Great North of Scotland; Suburban service 1887–1937 | Don Street |
