= Union Square Aberdeen =

Union Square
- Location: Guild Street, Aberdeen, Scotland
- Coordinates: 57°8′37″N 2°5′42″W
- Opened: 29 October 2009
- Developer: Hammerson
- Owner: Hammerson
- Num. of stores: 60
- Num. of anchor tenants: 1 (Marks & Spencer)
- Floor area: 700,000 sq ft (65,000 m^{2})
- Floors: 2
- Parking: 1700 spaces
- Website: unionsquareaberdeen.com

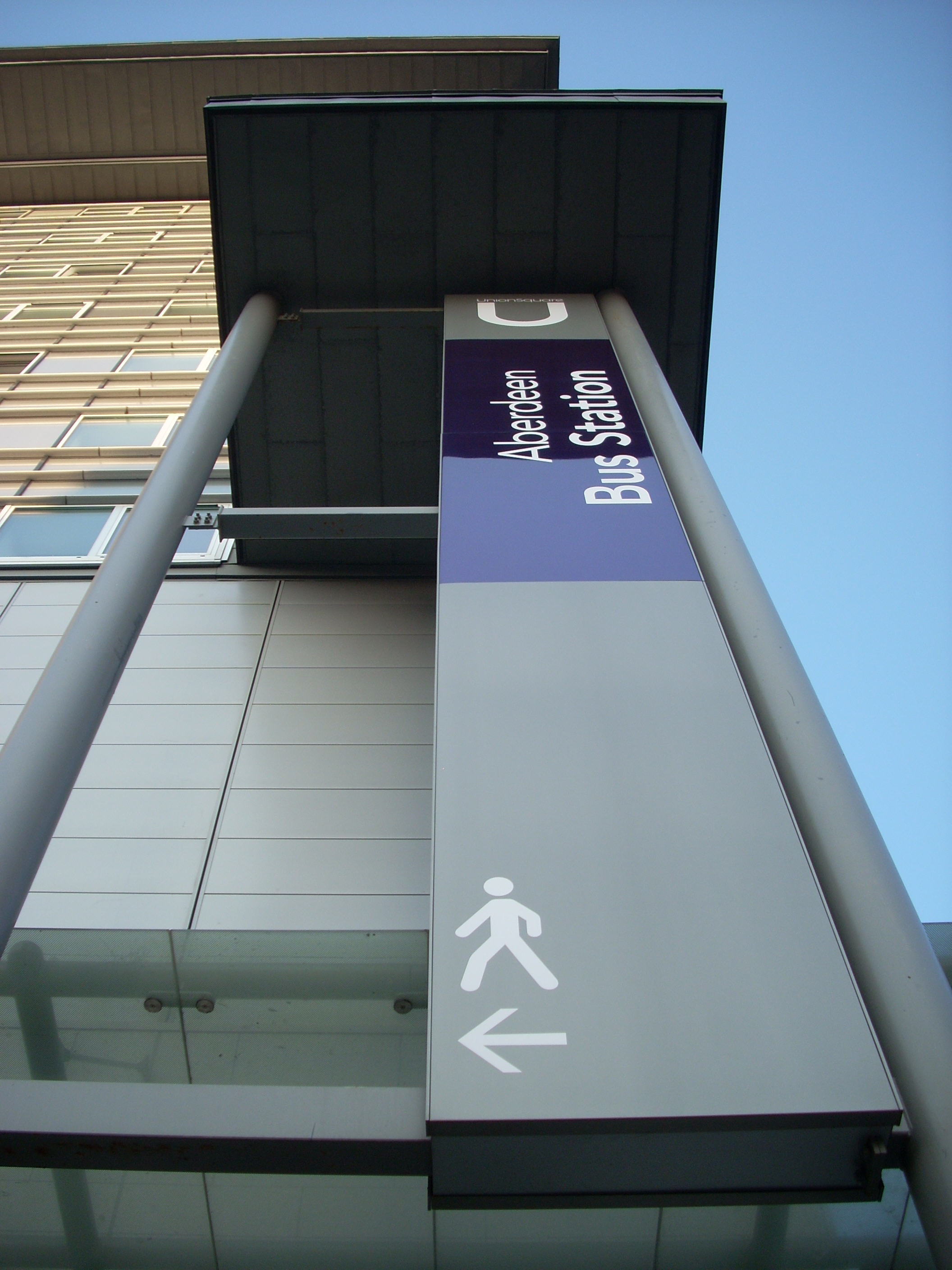
Sign directing pedestrians to Aberdeen Bus Station.

Union Square is a shopping centre located in the centre of Aberdeen, Scotland, which opened to the public on Thursday, 29 October 2009. The centre contains a covered shopping mall and retail park. Located on Guild Street and Market Street, the development adjoins onto the side of Aberdeen railway station and Aberdeen bus station creating a transport hub. The shopping centre houses more than 60 shops, over fifteen restaurants, a ten screen 2,300 seat Cineworld cinema (the largest in Aberdeen) and a 3-star Leonardo hotel with 203 rooms.

== History ==
Following delays, the developer Hammerson began construction of Union Square in 2007. Costing £250 million, the development has a total retail space of 700,000 square feet (65,000 m^{2}). The hotel opened in early September 2009 as the first business to open as part of the Union Square regeneration programme and the rest of the shopping centre opened 7 weeks later on 29 October. More than 40 shops were trading on opening day and this number rose to around 50 by Christmas, with many other retailers opening in 2010 and into 2011 onwards.

In January 2024, Marks & Spencer announced that the Union Square store will be extended, absorbing the neighbouring TK Maxx, with the expanded store opening in 2025 following the Bon Accord Centre branch closing.

== Transportation ==
The construction of Union Square on disused railway land also saw the redevelopment of Aberdeen bus station. The shopping centre is now part of a covered interchange between the bus and railway station. Additional bus services run past the centre via Guild Street.

== See also ==
- Retail in Aberdeen
- St Nicholas & Bon Accord
- Trinity Shopping Centre
