= Guild Street, Aberdeen =

Street in Aberdeen, Scotland, United Kingdom

Coordinates: 57.14484°N 2.09749°W

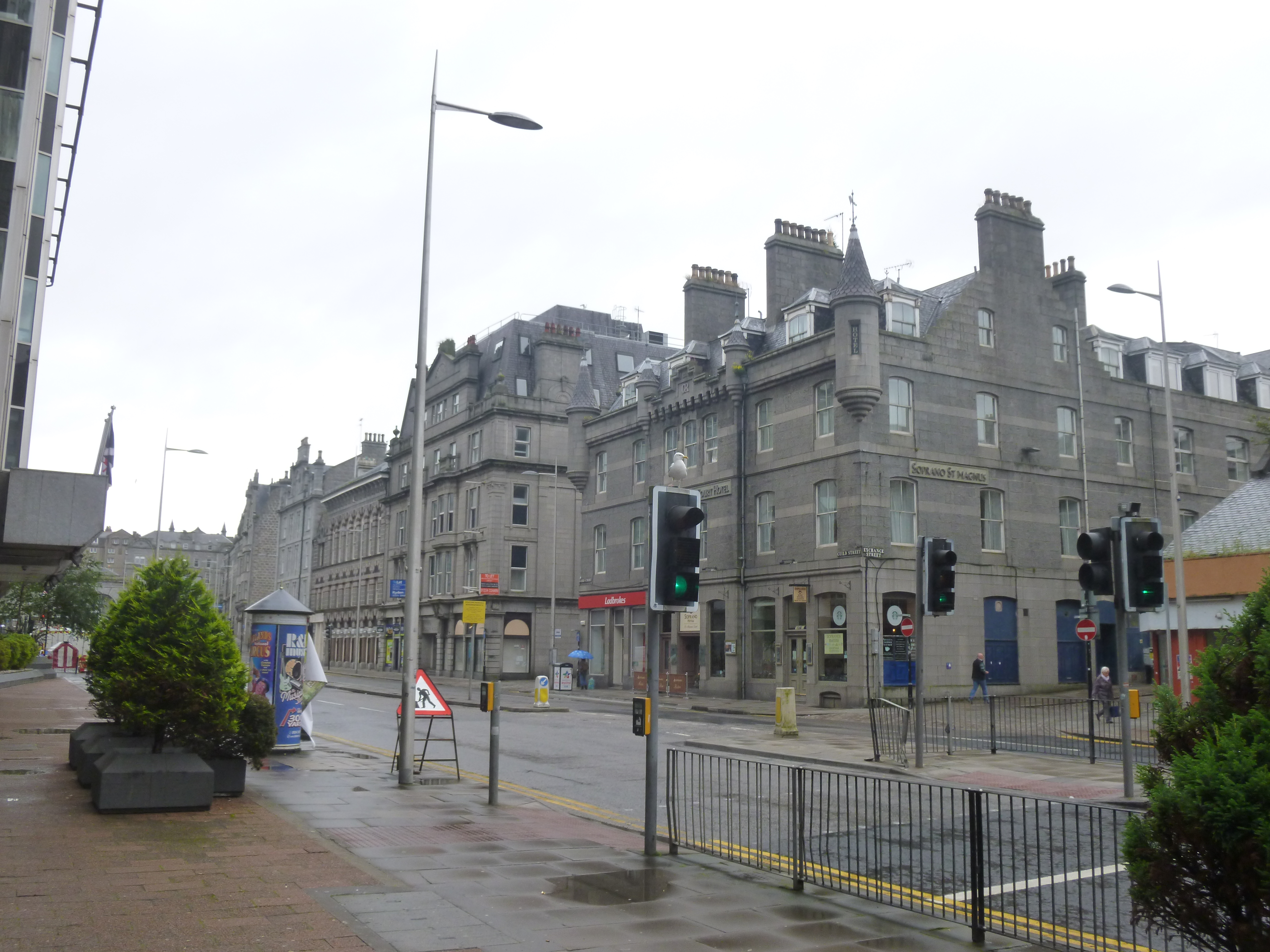
View of one side of Guild Street

Guild Street is a main street in the city centre of Aberdeen, Scotland, close to the harbour.

== Historic buildings ==
Her Majesty's Opera House opened in 1872. The listed building of the reopened Tivoli Theatre, Guild Street drill hall, and the Staton Hotel are on the street. The Custom House, 2 Guild Street and 50, 52, 54 Guild Street are noted.

== Transportation ==
Guild Street has Aberdeen railway station and one of the two entrances to Aberdeen bus station on it. Alongside these is the site of the former Aberdeen Guild Street railway station which became a goods station after the construction of the "joint" railway station (on the site of the present facility, which is itself the second building to house the "joint" station), but the former goods station has since been closed and demolished, leaving only some goods sidings behind the site.

From 1903 to 1931 the Aberdeen Corporation Tramways ran through Guild Street en route to Torry.

== Union Square ==
Guild Street is home to Union Square Aberdeen, the second biggest shopping centre in Scotland. Built on top of the old Guild Street railway yards and goods station, the centre opened in 2009 and cost £250 million. The rear entrance of the Trinity Shopping Centre is also on the street.

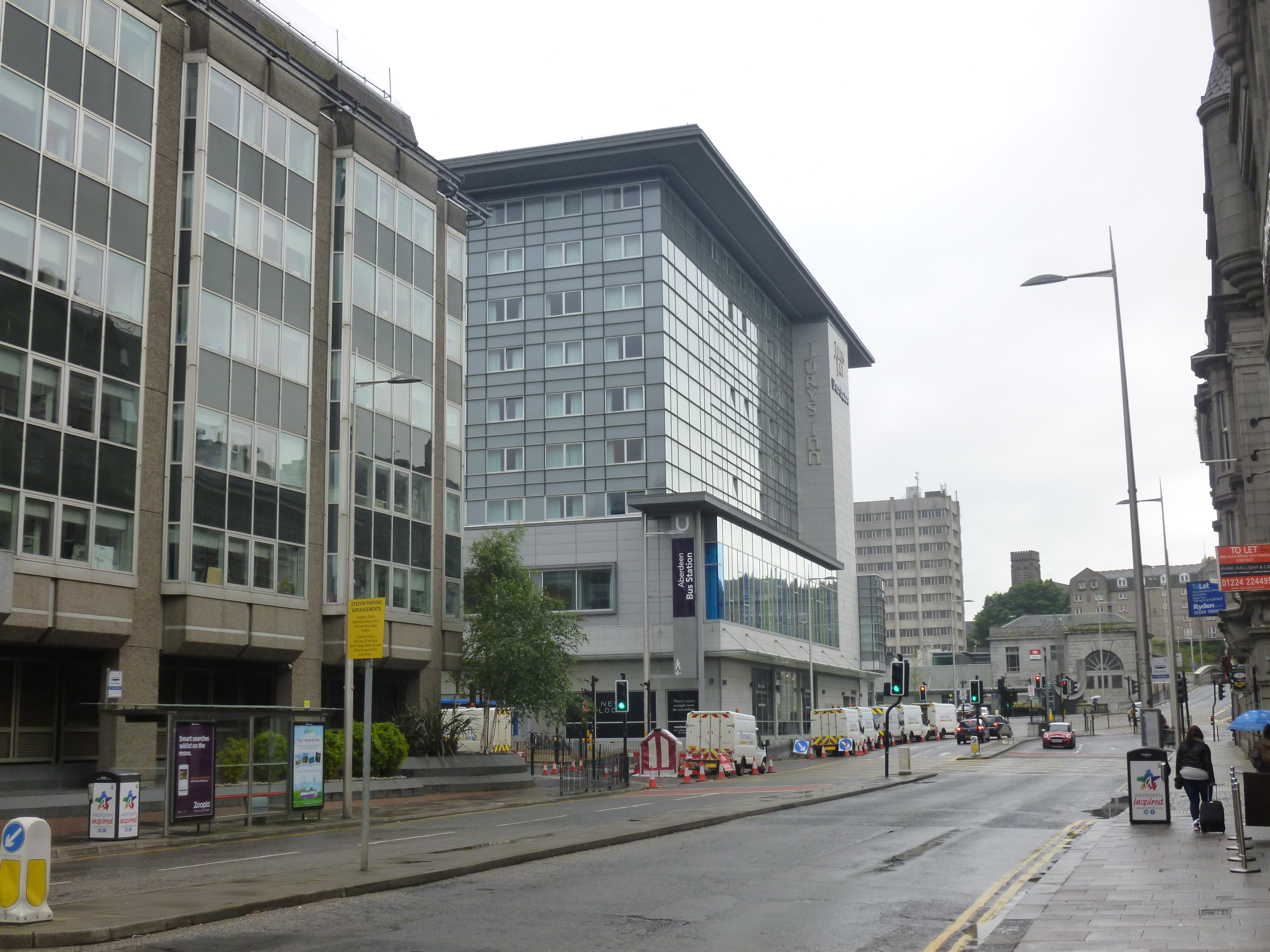
View of Guild Street, Aberdeen
