= Cove Bay railway station =

Disused railway station in Cove Bay, Aberdeenshire

Cove Bay
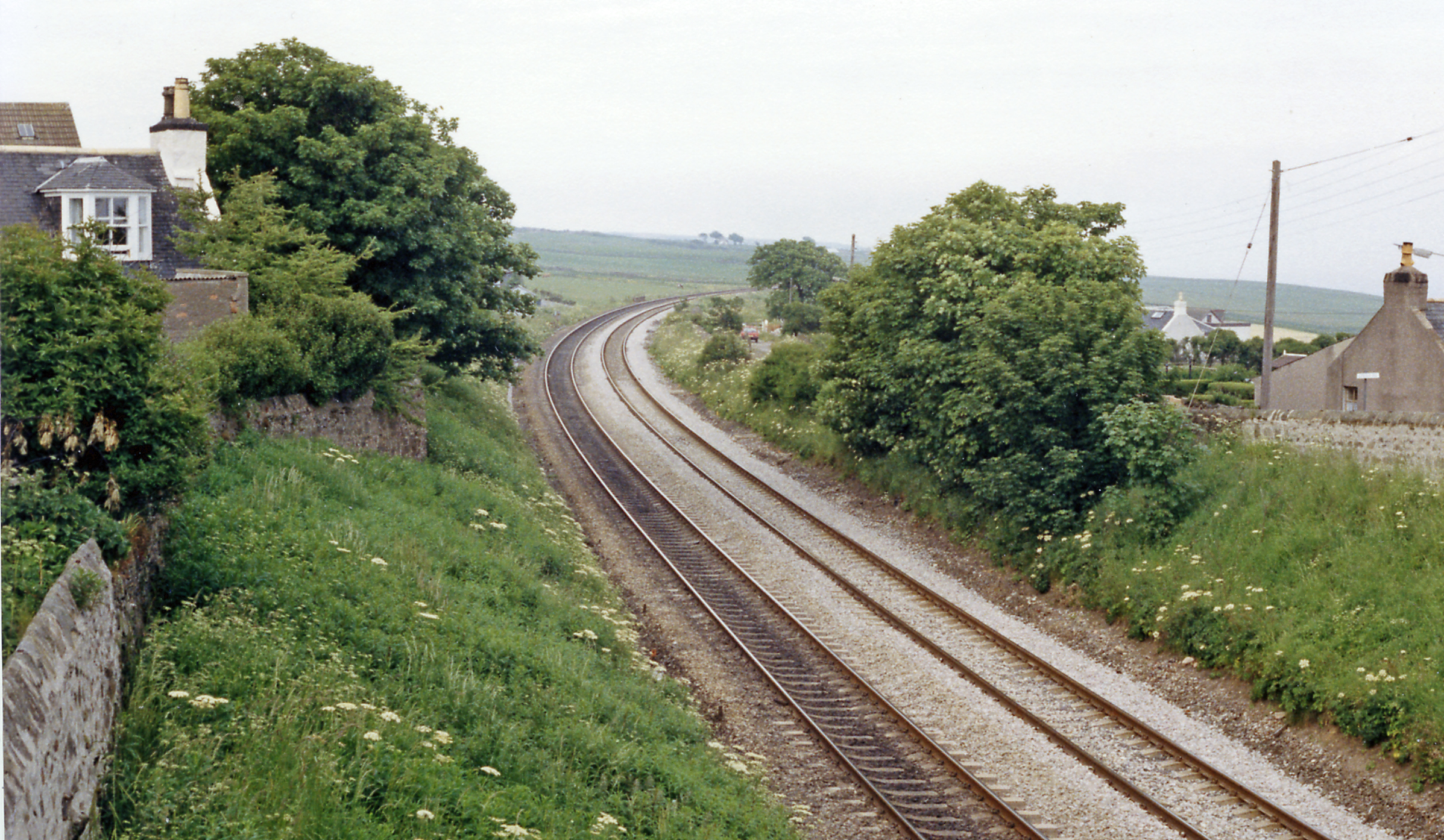
- The site of the station in June 1988

General information
- Location: Cove Bay, Aberdeenshire; Scotland
- Coordinates: 57.1003°N 2.0787°W
- Grid reference: NJ953010
- Platforms: 2

Other information
- Status: Disused

History
- Original company: Aberdeen Railway
- Pre-grouping: Aberdeen Railway; Caledonian Railway
- Post-grouping: London, Midland and Scottish Railway

Key dates
- 1 April 1850: Opened as Cove
- 1 October 1912: Name changed to Cove Bay
- 11 June 1956: Closed
Location

Cove Bay railway station served the suburb of Cove Bay, Aberdeen, Scotland from 1850 to 1956 on the Aberdeen Railway.

== History ==
The station opened as Cove on 1 April 1850 by the Aberdeen Railway. The name was changed to Cove Bay on 1 October 1912. The station closed to passengers on 11 June 1956 and to goods on 28 October 1963.

== Future ==
In 2020 the north-east of Scotland transport body Nestrans secured £80,000 from the Local Rail Development Fund to explore the potential for additional stations between Aberdeen and Laurencekirk, including at Cove and Newtonhill. Whilst a property developer has lodged proposals for 167 new homes close to where locals are calling for the new Cove railway station to be built, council officers have said there could still be space for a railway halt or station to be accommodated within the site.

Preceding station	Historical railways	Following station
Aberdeen Ferryhill; Line open, station closed	Aberdeen Railway	Portlethen; Line and station open
