= Union Street, Aberdeen =

Street in Aberdeen, Scotland, United Kingdom

Coordinates: 57.1457098°N 2.1018608°W

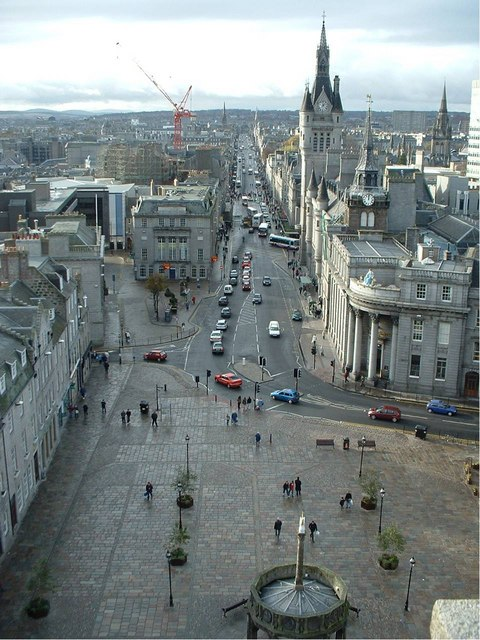
Looking down Union Street from the Citadel (over Castlegate, before Union Street begins)

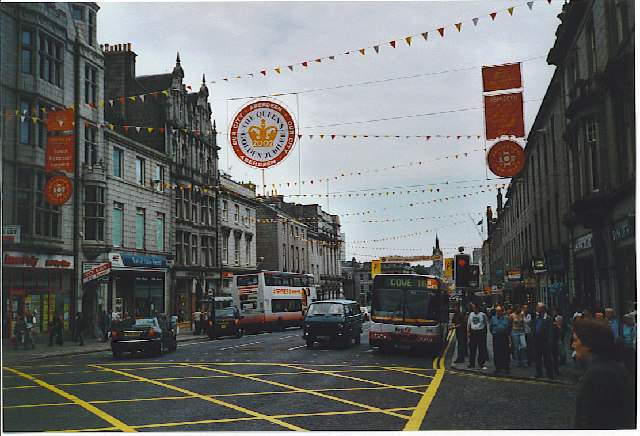
Union Street looking east

Union Street is a major street and shopping thoroughfare in Aberdeen, Scotland. It is named after the Acts of Union 1800 with Ireland.

The street is approximately one mile long (1.6 km) and a feat of engineering skill involving the partial levelling of St. Catherine's Hill and the building of arches to carry the street over Putachieside.

The Denburn Valley was crossed by Union Street by Union Bridge (constructed 1801–05). The Union Bridge holds the record of the 'Worlds largest single span granite bridge' at 130 feet (40 m) across.

== History ==
Union Street was built to relieve the strain of the small, cramped streets that caused problems for people coming into the city. It was built higher than the old town and was designed to include the five entrances from the city: Queens Road - Rubislaw from Hazelhead; George Street from Inverurie and Morayshire; King Street from the north from Bridge Of Don, Peterhead and Fraserburgh; Market Street, which leads to the fishing town of Torry; and Holburn Street to the Ruthrieston and Garthdee areas.

The street was designed in the beginning of the 19th century under plans suggested by Charles Abercrombie and nearly bankrupted the city. The political backing for the scheme was given by Thomas Leys chief magistrate of Aberdeen (and later Lord Provost) and James Hadden.

The Denburn River still runs under Union Bridge but has been covered over by a dual carriageway road. The Aberdeen tram network operated through Union Street from 1874 to 1958.

Pedestrianisation of the street was discussed as early as 1986.

Work began in May 2020 to partially pedestrianise the street and to widen the pavements. The street was completely pedestrianised between Bridge Street and Market Street, with buses routed through Guild Street instead. The street reopened to buses on 3 July 2022. In April 2024, Union Street closed to buses again to allow pavements to be permanently widened and a cycle lane installed in the section between Bridge Street and Market Street. The street will be reopened to buses on 1 December 2026.

In August 2021, Aberdeen City Council approved a project priced at £100,000 which will see the street and buildings cleaned, graffiti removed, and signs repaired. A study released in February 2022 priced repairs to buildings along the street at £11 million.

== Shops and markets ==
Like other high streets in Scotland, Union Street has seen an increase in empty shops with around a fifth of ground-level retail spaces unoccupied in 2020.

Some of the large shops on or accessed directly from Union Street are HMV, Mostyn McKenzie, Cruise, AllSaints, Lakeland, the Trinity Centre, and Sports Direct.

The street was home to Bruce Miller's notable musical instrument shop (established 1900) until June 2011, when it closed.

Both the Bon Accord Centre and the Trinity Centre have entrances on Union Street. In addition, there are bars and a number of nightclubs on the street, a former cinema building, and a grand façade fronting the churchyard of the Kirk of St. Nicholas.

In 2012, HSBC opened its biggest Scottish branch on the street. Pret a Manger also opened.

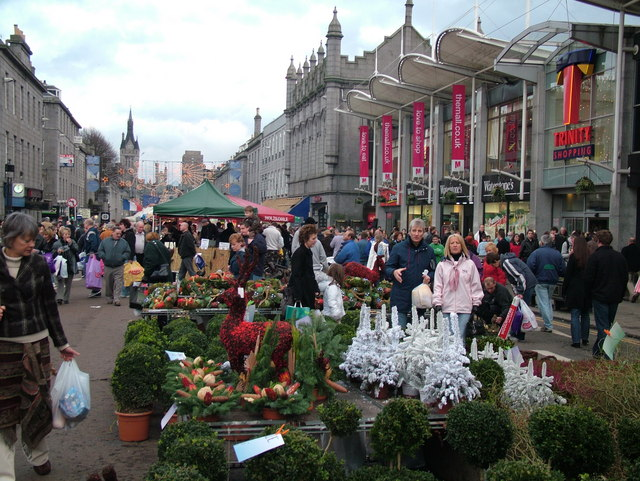
Union Street International Market

Part of Union Street was occasionally closed to traffic for the Aberdeen International Street Market until it was moved to Union Terrace, which is adjacent to Union Terrace Gardens. The market is usually held during the springtime.

In the runup to Christmas, elaborate Christmas lights are displayed on gantries above and across the street. A ceremony is usually held to mark the illumination of these lights.

== Granite Mile ==
The Granite Mile is a local name for the long stretch of road that encompasses Union Street. Granite Mile begins at the Castlegate, and the Mercat Cross, near Justice Street. It follows the length of Union Street to Holburn Junction.
