= Aberdeen Waterloo railway station =

Disused railway station in Aberdeen, Scotland

Aberdeen Waterloo
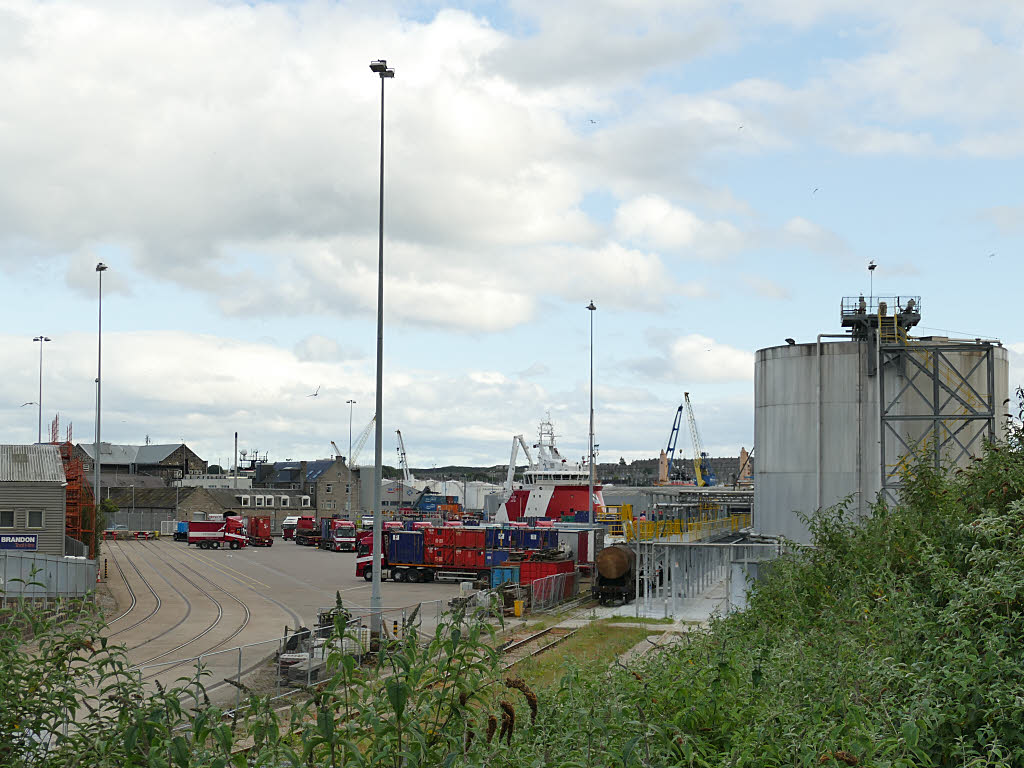
- Freight sidings on the site of the former station

General information
- Location: Aberdeen, Aberdeen; Scotland
- Coordinates: 57.147°N 2.087°W

Other information
- Status: Disused

History
- Original company: Great North of Scotland Railway
- Pre-grouping: GNoSR
- Post-grouping: LNER

Key dates
- 1 April 1856: Station opened to replace Aberdeen Kittybrewster
- 4 November 1867: Station closed and replaced by Aberdeen Joint
Location

Aberdeen Waterloo station opened on 1 April 1856 to serve the Great North of Scotland Railway main line to Keith. It was located on Waterloo Quay in the city centre. It closed to passengers in 1867 once Aberdeen Joint opened, but the track remains in use as a freight siding for the docks. The goods sheds were demolished in the 1960s, while the main station was converted for use as a storage facility.
