= Trinity Centre, Aberdeen =

Coordinates: 57°8′44″N 2°5′58″W

Trinity Centre

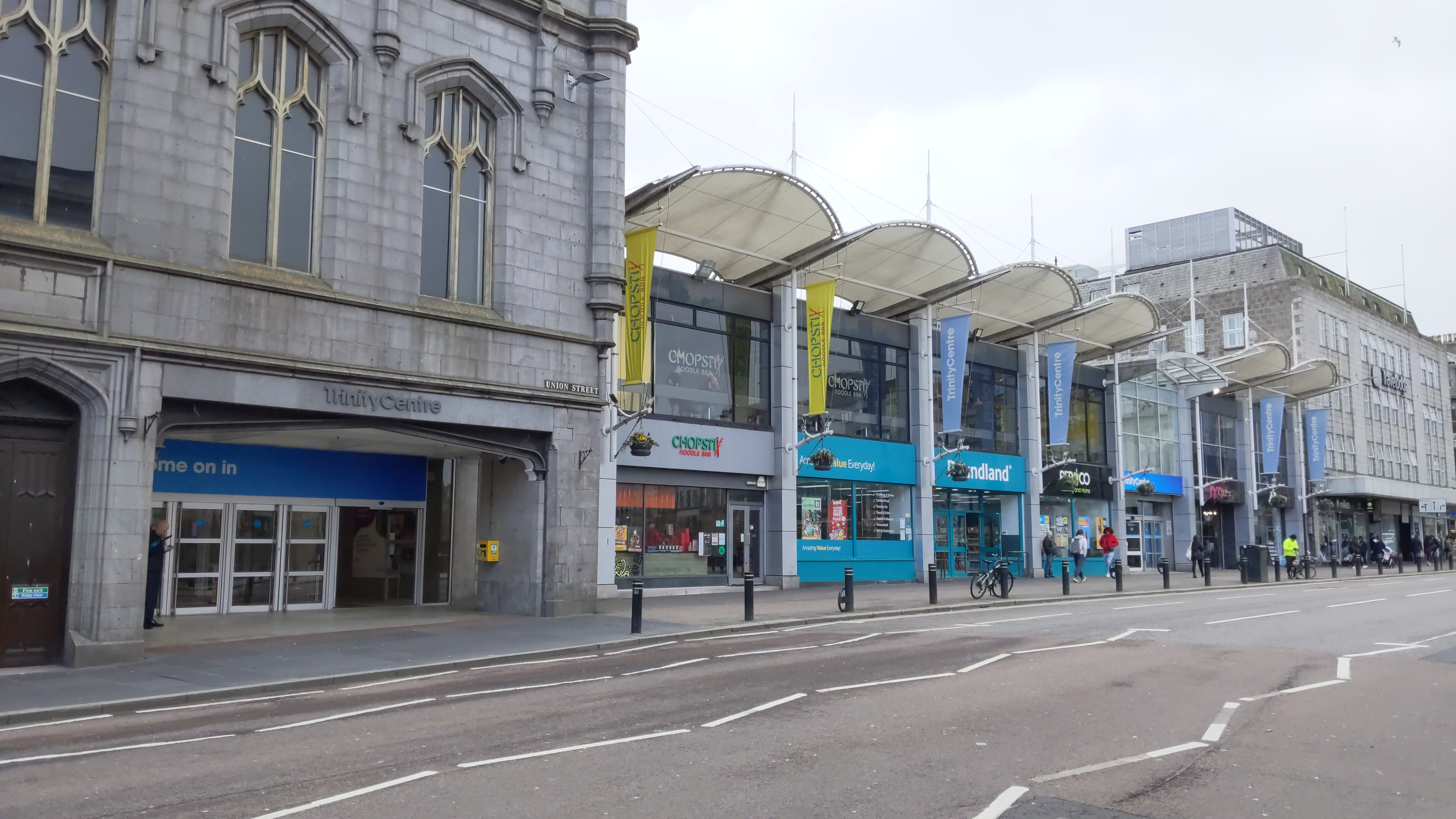
- Location: Aberdeen, Scotland
- Opened: 12 October 1984
- Num. of stores: 27
- Num. of anchor tenants: 2
- Floors: 1 (Some stores have more)
- Parking: 395 spaces
- Website: Trinity Centre

The Trinity Centre (known as The Mall Aberdeen from 2006 to December 2009, and before that as Trinity Shopping Centre) is a one floor shopping centre in Aberdeen, Scotland. It has a two level car park. There are 408 spaces and the main entrance is on Wapping Street. Wider spaces are available for parents and children and disabled people. Car Valeting services are now also provided.

The centre is located in the middle of the city with entrances on Union Street, Bridge Street and Guild Street. There is also an underground walkway that leads to Aberdeen railway station. It is built over the Aberdeen–Inverness line.

== History ==
The shops facing out onto Union Bridge predate the centre, opening in the 1960s.

The name "Trinity Centre" was announced in November 1982. The construction contractor was Balfour Beatty. The centre was named after the Trinity Hall building, the former base of the Seven Incorporated Trades of Aberdeen. The building was retained and used as an entrance to the centre from Union Street.

The anchor tenant Debenhams opened its store on 11 October 1984 following a two-week delay.

The centre was previously owned and operated by The Mall Fund. They sold it to an asset management company in December 2009.

On 16 December 2020, HMV announced it would close its Trinity Centre branch with plans to move elsewhere within Aberdeen. After reaching a new lease agreement in the following week, it was able to remain open.

In February 2021, it was announced that the Debenhams branch would not reopen following its closure as part of the COVID-19 lockdown in the United Kingdom.
