= Aberdeen railway station =

Railway station in Aberdeen City, Scotland

Aberdeen Scottish Gaelic: Obar Dheathain
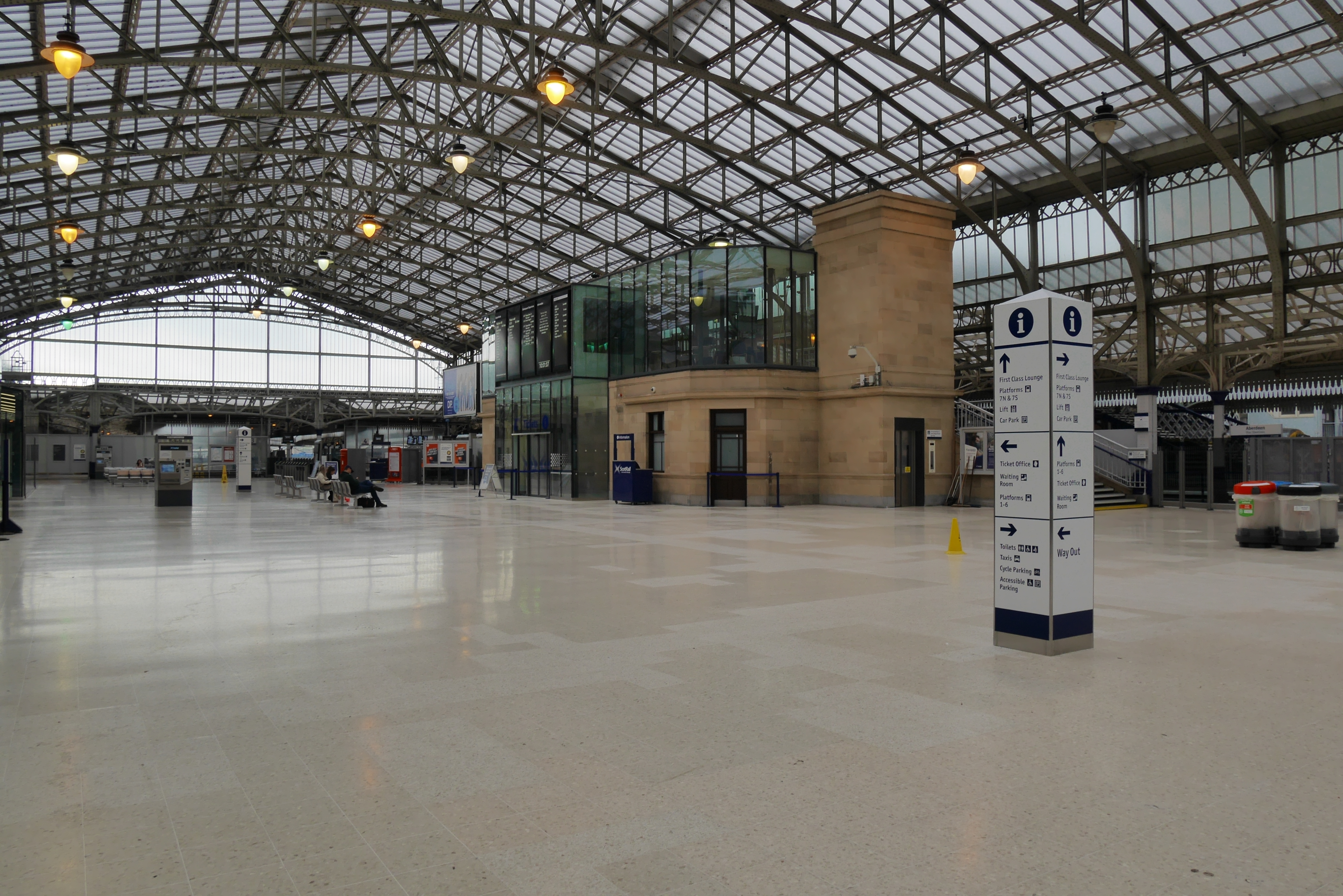
- The station concourse (2022)

General information
- Location: Aberdeen City, Scotland
- Coordinates: 57.1436°N 2.0985°W
- Grid reference: NJ941058
- Owner: Network Rail
- Manager: ScotRail
- Platforms: 6 (numbered 2–7)
- Train operators: ScotRail; CrossCountry; London North Eastern Railway; Caledonian Sleeper

Other information
- Station code: ABD

History
- Original company: Denburn Valley Line
- Pre-grouping: Caledonian Railway; Great North of Scotland Railway
- Post-grouping: London Midland and Scottish Railway; London and North Eastern Railway

Key dates
- 4 November 1867: Station opened as Aberdeen Joint to replace Guild Street and Waterloo
- 1913–16: Rebuilt
- 1952: Renamed Aberdeen
- 2007–08: Major refurbishment
- 2020–22: Major redevelopment

Passengers
- 2020/21: ▼0.394 million
- Interchange: ▼27,863
- 2021/22: ▲1.537 million
- Interchange: ▲0.125 million
- 2022/23: ▲1.961 million
- Interchange: ▲0.179 million
- 2023/24: ▲2.288 million
- Interchange: ▲0.202 million
- 2024/25: ▲2.378 million
- Interchange: ▲0.219 million

Listed Building – Category A
- Official name: Guild Street Aberdeen Railway Station and Road Overbridge
- Designated: 2 March 1990
- Reference no.: LB20673
Location
Notes
- Passenger statistics from the Office of Rail and Road

Aberdeen railway station serves the city of Aberdeen in north east Scotland; in 2024-25, it was Scotland's eighth busiest railway station. It is located on Guild Street in the city centre, adjacent to Union Square. The station is the terminus of the Dundee–Aberdeen and Aberdeen–Inverness lines. The station is managed by ScotRail. Inter-city, regional, local and sleeper train services are provided to most regions of Great Britain by ScotRail, Caledonian Sleeper, CrossCountry and London North Eastern Railway. It lies 241 miles 6 chains (241.1 mi; 388.0 km) from Carlisle, via Perth.

== History ==
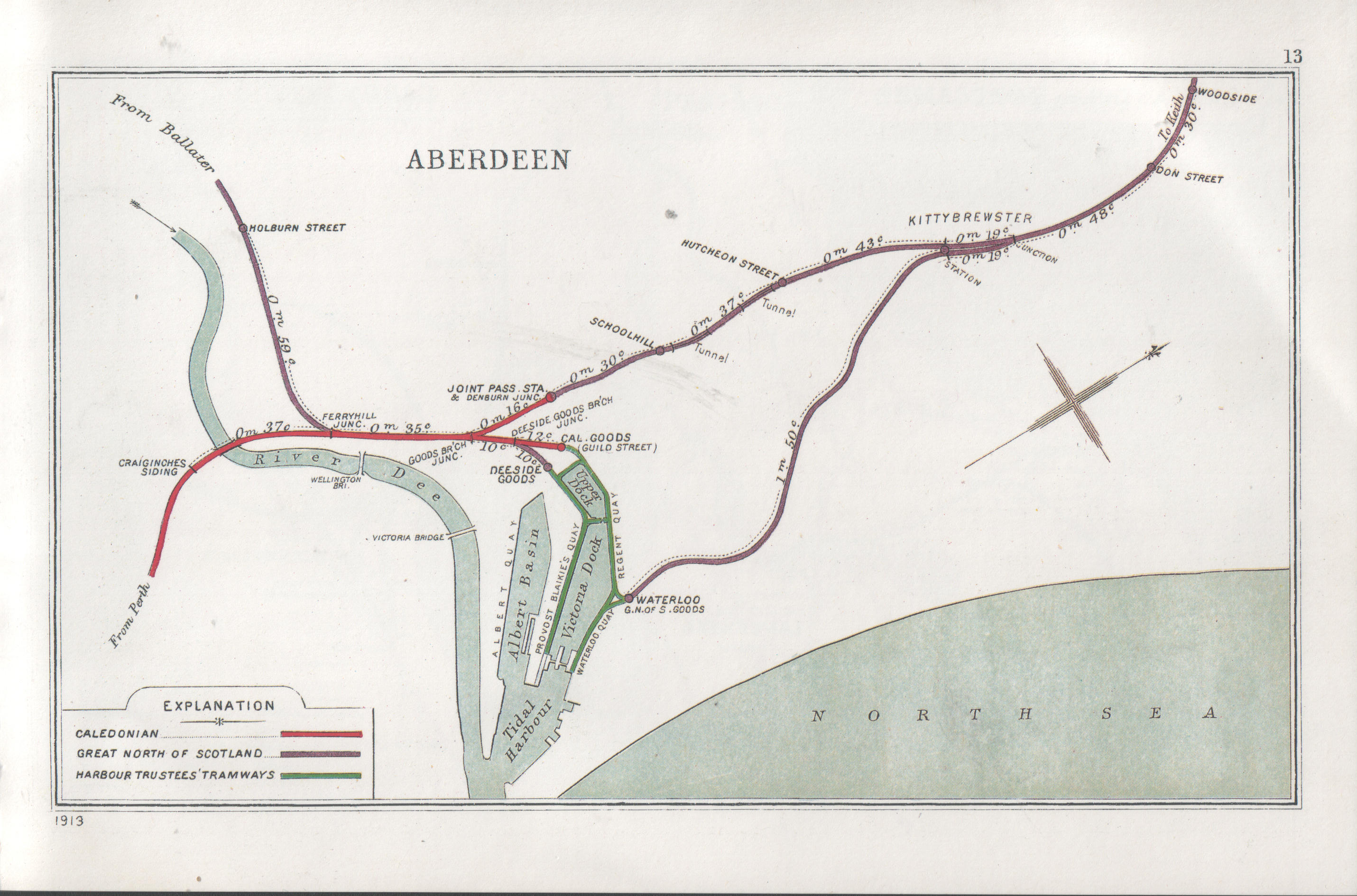
A 1913 Railway Clearing House junction diagram showing railways in the vicinity of Aberdeen; the present station shown here as JOINT PASS. STA.

=== Pre-nationalisation ===
The station currently standing was built and opened in 1867, although it has since been significantly redeveloped from the original. The new Denburn Valley Line enabled the main line from the south and the commuter line from Deeside to connect with the line from the north. The lines from the south had previously terminated at the adjacent Aberdeen Guild Street. Even this had not been Aberdeen's first railway station; that distinction belonging to a previous terminus a short way south at Ferryhill.

Prior to the construction of the joint station, lines from the north had terminated at Aberdeen Waterloo, a short but inconvenient distance along the edge of the harbour. This, too, became a goods station after the construction of the joint station.

In 1912, work started on a £180,000 (equivalent to £17,800,000 in 2025) rebuild of the joint station by the contractors Anderson of Glasgow, supervised by James Alexander Parker, the engineer of the Great North of Scotland Railway. By 1913, the five platforms stretching out from the north end of the arched station area were fitted with roofs and a new bridge was added giving access to all of the platforms. The previous station roof, which formed a prodigious arch 500 feet (150 m) in length and 97 feet (30 m) span, was removed.

The expansion of the station required the acquisition of neighbouring streets and properties, which extended the station boundaries on the north, south and east sides. During 1915, the station handled 200 passenger arrivals and departures. The new station provided 13 platforms with a total frontage of 2½ miles; the longest (no. 6) was 1,596 feet (486 m) long. The main walls of the station building were constructed from granite and freestone in cement mortar. The new granite was quarried at Kemnay, Aberdeenshire, and the freestone from Baxter and Blackpasture Quarries in Northumberland. The new station was provided with electric light throughout and synchronised clocks with a master clock off one of the booking offices.

=== Nationalisation and privatisation ===
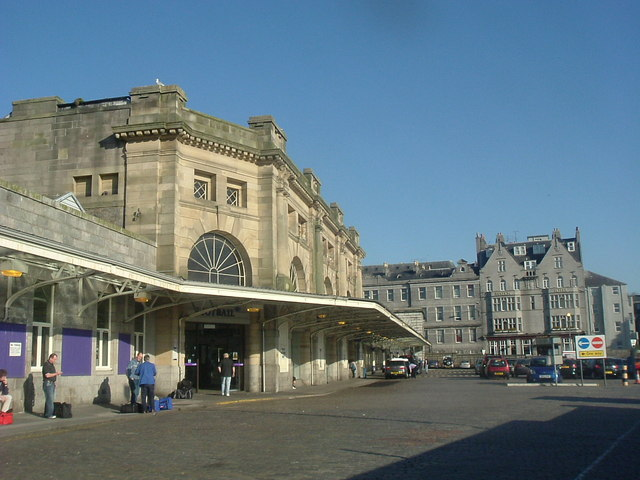
The entrance to the station, seen in 2006, before redevelopment as part of Union Square; the Station Hotel can be seen in the background

As a result of the grouping of railway companies under the Railways Act 1921, Aberdeen was shared by the London and North Eastern Railway and the London Midland and Scottish Railway; each company ran the station for a year and then handing its administration to the other company. At nationalisation in 1948, it then became part of British Rail. As part of the changes during this period, which saw a general contraction of railway services in Great Britain, some services were cut in the 1960s; these included those running north to Peterhead and Ellon as well as the Deeside Line. Suburban services were heavily reduced and the grand suburban ticket office, located on the corner of Guild Street and Bridge Street, was closed; it now houses a hair and beauty salon.

The number of platforms at the station were also reduced considerably in the early 1970s, from the 13 of the late 1950s/early 1960s down to just seven by 1973. This rationalisation process saw the removal of all of the north end bay platforms to allow for redevelopment of that part of the site. However, significant improvements under British Rail included introduction of InterCity 125 high-speed service to London and other major destinations, with the introduction of other new rolling stock. Other improvements included a new travel centre opened in 1978 and under British Rail's regional brand ScotRail, a major station renovation was completed in the 1980s. The station was also resignalled around this time, with two more bay platforms (1 & 2) taken out of use along with the former through platforms (8 & 9). This left just five platforms (3–7) in regular use; the layout that remains in operation to this day. The two former bay platforms remain in place and are used as sidings. The former double track through platforms 8 and 9 has since been singled, but the platform faces remain.

At privatisation in the mid-1990s, ownership of the station passed to Railtrack, (Note: Along with all stations and other infrastructure in England, Wales and Scotland.) while day-to-day management passed to the train-operating franchisee ScotRail, a division of National Express. Following the quasi-nationalisation of railway infrastructure in the early 2000s, the station is now owned by Network Rail. In 2004, the train-operating franchise and station management were taken over by First ScotRail. ScotRail continue to operate trains. but the station and all signage is now branded with the ScotRail logo, typeface and rolling stock livery.

=== Motorail ===
British Rail's Motorail service ran between London and Aberdeen from 1968 to 1995. Plans to reintroduce the service were announced in 1998 and confirmed in 1999.

=== Listed building ===
Historic Environment Scotland designate the current building and road overbridge as Category A, noting that it was the last major station to be completed in Scotland in the period 1913-20.

=== Recent developments ===
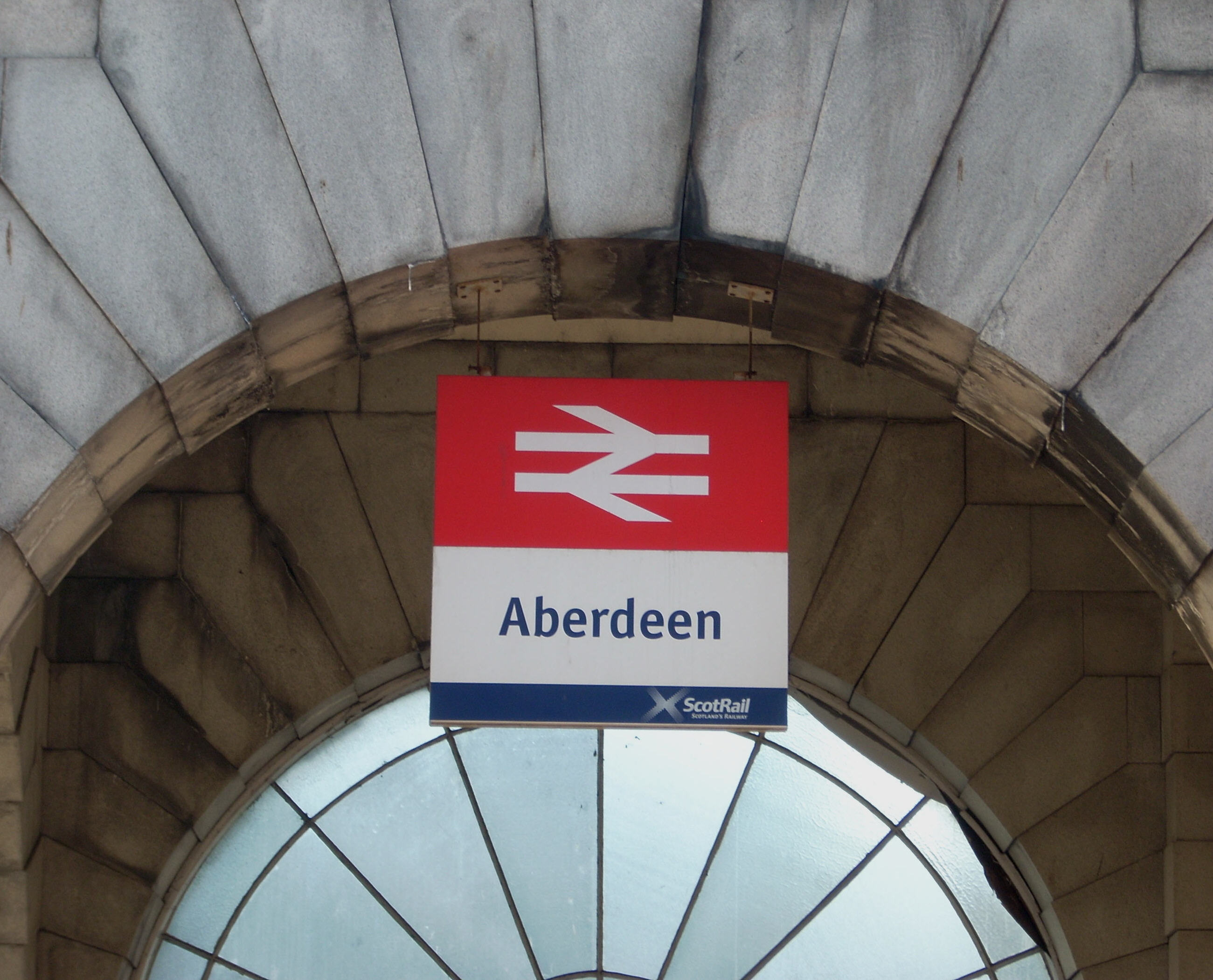
Signage at Aberdeen station (2012)

Plans to relocate the ticket office and passenger waiting room, as well as upgrades to the taxi rank and concourse, were approved by Aberdeen City Council in December 2018, with work commencing in spring 2019. Under a separate scheme, the vacant Atholl House building to the north of the station is to be demolished, making way for the construction of a public square, hotel and student accommodation, and improved connections between the city's main Union Street and the station. This development could allow the currently disused platforms 8 and 9 to be brought back into service.

In 2019, the station's glass roof was replaced with polycarbonate panels as part of a £9 million upgrade. In June 2020, ScotRail announced that it would proceed with the modifications to the ticket office, waiting room and taxi rank as soon as it was safe to do so, following the coronavirus pandemic; there were no plans to reinstate the platforms. These developments were completed by the end of 2021.

In March 2021, it was confirmed that further work would be undertaken to improve the passenger experience in the station, including significant improvement in retail facilities, improvements to the taxi rank area and better connectivity with Union Square and the wider city centre.

The North Corner Pavilion Building, which had fallen into disrepair, was restored as part of the station redevelopment in December 2021. Repairs were sympathetic and in keeping with the original features of the category A-listed building. The restoration was recognised in the 2022 National Railway Heritage Awards, where it won the Arch Company Award for Urban Heritage.

By December 2022, all improvement works were completed. Both the ticket office and first class lounge were relocated to allow for further retail space. Modern glazed frontage was added to the units. Four new customer information screens were installed as part of renovation works, along with improvements to staff accommodation; it was funded by the Scottish Government, ScotRail, Network Rail, the Railway Heritage Trust and Serco. Jenny Gilruth, the transport minister, opened the redeveloped station on 5 December 2022.

== Facilities ==
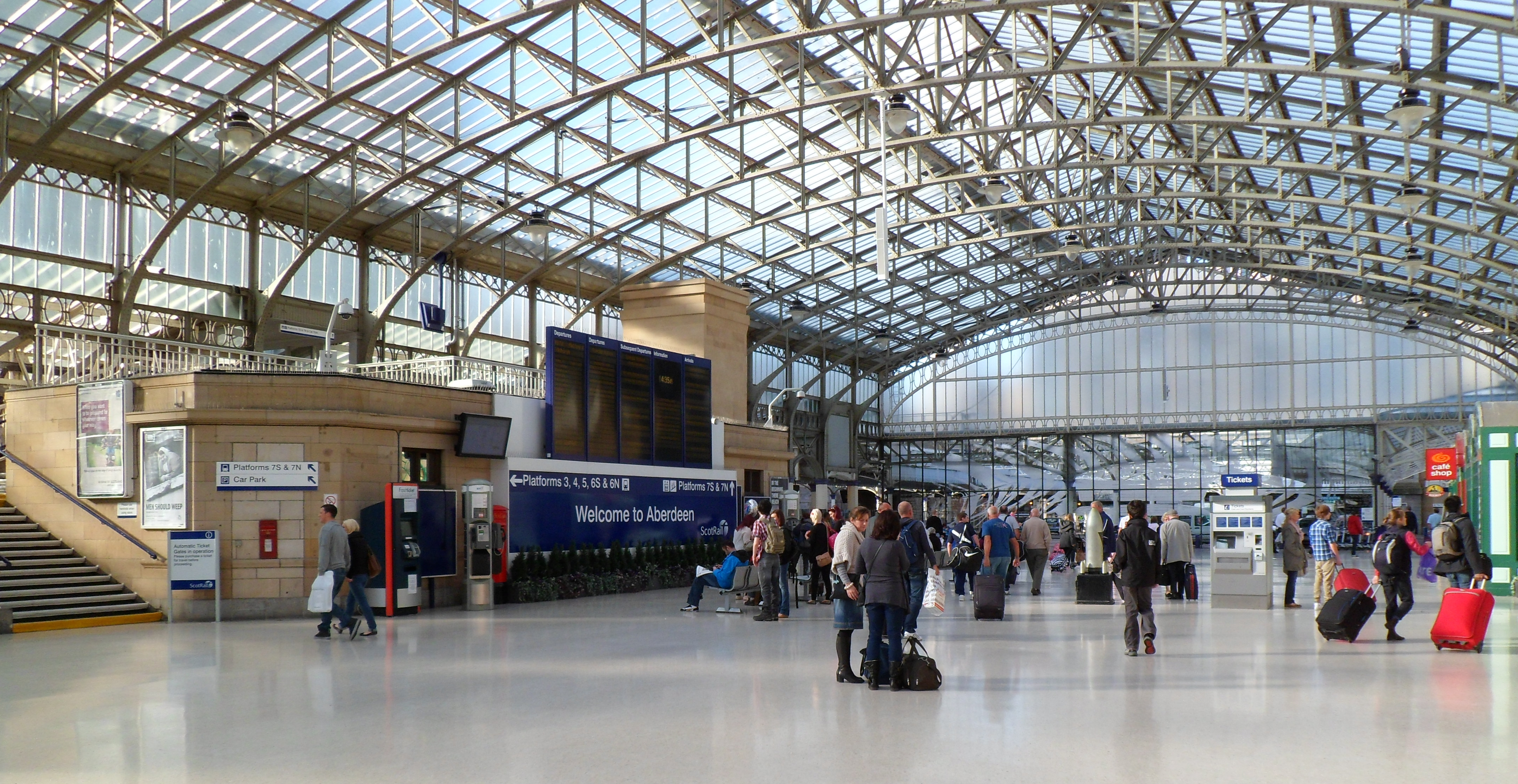
Concourse at Aberdeen station (2011)

There is a staffed travel centre providing ticket office and information facilities. There are also ticket machines outside this office and in the main concourse. The entrance to the ScotRail first-class lounge is located above the ticket office. Luggage trolleys are provided for travellers with baggage and a left-luggage facility is available with access from the front forecourt of the station. There is step-free access to all platforms from the bridge. There are also two sets of toilets near the main entrance, as well as payphones and an excess fares office.

A waiting room is available on the main concourse, as is a branch of WH Smith selling books, magazines, stationery and confectionery. A wide range of other shopping facilities are located in the Union Square complex, which can be accessed directly through the concourse and is integrated with the station building.

== Passenger volume ==
The main origin or destination station for journeys to or from Aberdeen in the 2022–23 period was Edinburgh Waverley, making up 216,214 of the 1,961,414 journeys (13.3%).

Passenger Volume at Aberdeen (Note: The statistics cover twelve month periods that start in April.)
	2004–05	2005–06	2006–07	2007–08	2008–09	2009–10	2010–11	2011–12	2012–13	2013–14	2014–15	2015–16	2016–17	2017–18	2018–19	2019–20	2020–21	2021–22	2022–23	2023–24	2024–25
Entries and exits	1,931,973	2,107,855	2,278,872	2,470,281	2,568,810	2,657,014	2,964,302	3,170,464	3,338,072	3,599,431	3,742,646	3,459,944	3,058,268	2,948,150	2,616,142	2,497,108	393,982	1,536,720	1,961,414	2,287,858	2,377,660
Interchanges	187,983	201,417	230,788	119,259	162,526	164,299	148,594	197,040	200,864	219,085	219,002	204,139	192,344	179,958	258,416	237,220	27,863	124,666	179,272	202,181	218,903

== Services ==
The station is served by four train operating companies, which provide the following general off-peak service pattern in trains per hour (tph):

ScotRail:

- 1 tph to Edinburgh Waverley, via Dundee
- 1 tph to Glasgow Queen Street, via Dundee, Perth and Stirling
- 1 tp2h to Inverness, via Keith and Elgin
- 1 tph to Inverurie
- 1 tph to Montrose.

London North Eastern Railway:

- 3 tpd to London King's Cross, via Dundee, Edinburgh Waverley, Newcastle and York
- 1 tpd to Doncaster, via Dundee, Edinburgh Waverley, Newcastle and York.

CrossCountry:

- 1 tpd to Plymouth, along the Cross Country Route
- 1 tpd to Edinburgh Waverley, via Dundee and Haymarket.

Caledonian Sleeper:

- 1 tpd to London Euston, via Preston and Crewe.

Preceding station	National Rail	Following station
Dundee	CrossCountry; Cross Country Route	Terminus
Stonehaven	CrossCountry; Cross Country Route	Terminus
Stonehaven	Caledonian Sleeper; East Coast Main Line	Terminus
Stonehaven	London North Eastern Railway; East Coast Main Line	Terminus
Portlethen	ScotRail; Dundee–Aberdeen line	Terminus
Terminus	ScotRail; Aberdeen–Inverness line	Dyce
Portlethen to Montrose	ScotRail; Aberdeen Crossrail	Dyce to Inverurie
	Ferry services	
Terminus	NorthLink Ferries; Shetland ferry service	Lerwick
Terminus	NorthLink Ferries; Orkney ferry service	Kirkwall
	Historical railways	
Terminus	Caledonian Railway; Aberdeen Railway	Cove Bay; Line open, station closed
Terminus	Great North of Scotland Railway; Deeside Railway	Holburn Street; Line partly open, station closed
Terminus	GNoSR / CR Joint; Denburn Valley Line	Schoolhill; Line open, station closed

== Connections ==
Regional and national bus services depart from Aberdeen bus station, including the Jet 727 to Aberdeen Airport. It is located on the other side of the adjoining Union Square shopping centre.

The station offers interchange with the city's ferry terminal, which lies approximately 450 m (490 yd) away; it is the departure point for ferry services operated by NorthLink Ferries to the Orkney and Shetland Islands.

== See also ==
- Aberdeen Ferryhill TMD
