= Aberdeen City Garden Project =

Failed park redevelopment proposal

The Aberdeen City Garden Project was a £140.5m project to redevelop the Union Terrace Gardens in Aberdeen after Aberdeen oil tycoon Sir Ian Wood pledged to donate £50m to the redevelopment of Union Terrace Gardens. In 2012, he pledged a further £35m should the project overrun. The design 'The Granite Web' by Diller Scofido and Renfro and Keppie Design won an international design competition in 2011 and was approved in a referendum on the development of the current gardens in February/March 2012. The project was vetoed in August 2012 following a council vote.

== The Current Gardens ==
The current Union Terrace Gardens opened in 1879 are sunken into the landscape of Aberdeen and cover approximately two and a half acres. To the North of the gardens, is His Majesty's Theatre, to the south -Union Street, to the west — Union Terrace and to the East the railway line. The campaign group Friends of Union Terrace Gardens opposed the development, instead preferring for the gardens to be left as they are with minimal development but cleaning them up to make them more appealing to the public.

== The City Square Project & Initial Public Consultation ==
In 2008, Sir Ian Wood first announced his plans to donate £50m to the redevelopment of Union Terrace Gardens. In January 2010, initial concept graphics were created following a technical appraisal of the gardens' potential by Halliday Fraser Munro. A public consultation was held to gauge public support for the project. The consultation showed that 55% of people were opposed to the plans at the time. It also showed that the main concerns of the public were the amount of concrete, cost, the need for a contemporary arts centre, the potential for the development to become another shopping destination and the loss of green space. After the consolation, the project was rebranded The City Garden Project to help address the concerns of people regarding a concrete development and loss of green space as well as to help place emphasis on the garden/park direction of the project.

== International Design Competition ==
On 18 April 2011 an international design competition run by Malcolm Reading Consultants was launched. The contest was open to entries until 13 June 2011 with the winner to be scheduled announced in December 2011 - though due to delays, the winner was not announced until January 2012. In total, 55 entries were submitted to the competition. Six were then chosen to move forward to the Public Exhibition which was held at [The Academy Shopping Centre] between 19 October and 2 November 2011. The six designs were:

- The Granite Web
- The Winter Garden
- Sculpted Landform & Connections
- The Flower of Scotland
- The Cultural Plaza
- Cultural Podium

Visitors to the exhibition used preferential voting to determine which two designs would then move on to face the final jury. Those designs were:

- The Granite Web — Diller Scofidio and Renfro (New York)/Keppie Design (Glasgow) with Olin Studio (Overall winner)
- The Winter Garden — Foster & Partners (London)/Vladimir Djurovic Landscape Architecture (Beirut) with landscape architects Gardiner and Theobold

During the exhibition period, over 15,000 people visited the display. The winning design of Granite Web was announced on 16 January 2012.

== The Referendum ==
On 14 December 2011, Aberdeen City Council approved a referendum on the future of Union Terrace Gardens. All persons registered on Aberdeen's local government electoral roll by 10 January 2012 were eligible to vote. The referendum ran from 16 February to 1 March 2012. Around 165,000 voting packs were delivered on 16 March. For the referendum, voters were able to send back a postal ballot as well as cast a vote over the phone or by going online using a designated code included in their voting packs. Also on 16 February, BBC Radio Scotland broadcast a live debate on the City Garden Project. During the referendum Grampian Police investigated that supporters of the project were being abused through '...online bullying and intimidation, e-mail hacking, highly personal attacks and receipt of e-mails of a menacing or threatening nature'. Later in the referendum period, one man was arrested over comments he made on a social networking site. There were also claims that voting packs were stolen. The ballot closed at 17:00 on 1 March 2012 with results expected the next day. Vote counting took place at the Beach Ballroom, Aberdeen on the morning of 2 March 2012 beginning at 10:00GMT. Early indications showed that the City Gardens Project was supported by the public — these indications coming from a count of the online and phone votes. Just after 13:05GMT, after the count of the postal votes it was confirmed that the City Garden Project had been backed by voters with 45,301 votes over 41,175 against — a majority of 4,126.

=== Referendum Results ===
The results in full were as follows:

Referendum results
Design	Online votes		Phone votes		Postal votes (Note: There were 643 spoilt postal ballet votes.)		Total	
Design	Votes	Percentage	Votes	Percentage	Votes	Percentage	Votes	Percentage
Granite Web (GCP)	16,428	57.2%	5,073	55.4%	23,800	49.0%	45,301	52.4%
Union Terrace Gardens	12,274	42.8%	4,081	44.6%	24,820	51.0%	41,175	47.6%
Total	28,702	100%	9,154	100%	48,620	100%	86,476	100%

== Granite Web ==
The winning design Granite Web promised to make the gardens a 'new green and vibrant heart to Aberdeen with accessible gardens and parks and space for cultural and recreational activities'. It also aimed to connect different parts of the city and make the gardens more accessible by raising them out of the valley up to street level to connect with Union Street, Union Terrace, Rosemount Viaduct and Belmont Street. The garden design was split into 11 different sections including a new 5,000 seat, grass lawn outdoor performance space called 'The Forum', a tree lined avenue, lawn and flower garden. Also included was cultural centre in the centre of the gardens, modelled in the style of a butterfly. The roof covering was to be grass and this will be another place for people to access and use. The Granite Web plans also allowed an opportunity for new art in Aberdeen with two new sculptures to have been installed at two exit points from the garden onto Union Terrace — one from the Flower Garden and one from The Forum. The gardens also promised to plant 100 more trees — raising the number to 186 in the space, increase the percentage of space by 95%, a 250% increase in accessible space and a 65% increase in vegetation.

== Cost and Financing ==
The project was estimated to cost £140m - £50m of which was guaranteed by Aberdeen oil tycoon Sir Ian Wood. In 2012, a further pledge was made by Sir Ian Wood to donate a further £35m should the project run over budget. As of March 2012, 40% of the cost of the project was pledged. The rest was to new funded by an application for Tax Incremental Financing (TIF). The TIF was also set to fund in part other regeneration projects within the city including improvements to the Art Gallery — a project which has since been developed further since the rejection of the project.

== Scrapping of The City Garden Project ==
Following the election of the new Labour administration at the 2012 Local Elections, the future of the City Gardens Project was questioned and put to another vote in the council. This was a vote to scrap the project. On 22 August 2012, Aberdeen City Council voted 22-20 in favour of scrapping the project.

== 2013 Developments ==
Following the 2012 scrapping of the project, Sir Ian Wood stated that he would still be willing to contribute £50m to a new project to redevelop Union Terrace Gardens. At the same time, he also suggested that the new plans would need to be in place by the end of the year. On 29 August, new designs for a potential redevelopment of the gardens were unveiled in the media. The designs by city architect John Halliday involved partly raising the gardens whilst leaving parts sunk. The designs also incorporated a link onto Belmont Street by covering over the Denburn dual-carriageway and railway lines as well as a new arts centre and entrance to the railway station. It was reported in the 14 October 2013 issue of the Evening Express that the campaign group 'Friends of Union Terrace Gardens' who opposed the previous redevelopment plans also opposed these as they would "involve too much structural change to the Victorian green space". In December 2013, Aberdeen City Council rejected Sir Ian Wood's offer of £50million towards city centre and Union Terrace Gardens development. On 24 January 2014, Sir Ian's offer of £50m was formally withdrawn. The John Halliday plans from mid-August 2013 were developed further and were revealed in the Press and Journal on 27 January 2014. It involved adding a canopy over a pedestrianised section Union Street running from Bridge Street to Market Street including a section in front of the civic square in the mid-August plans.
