= County Buildings, Aberdeen =

County building in Aberdeen, Scotland

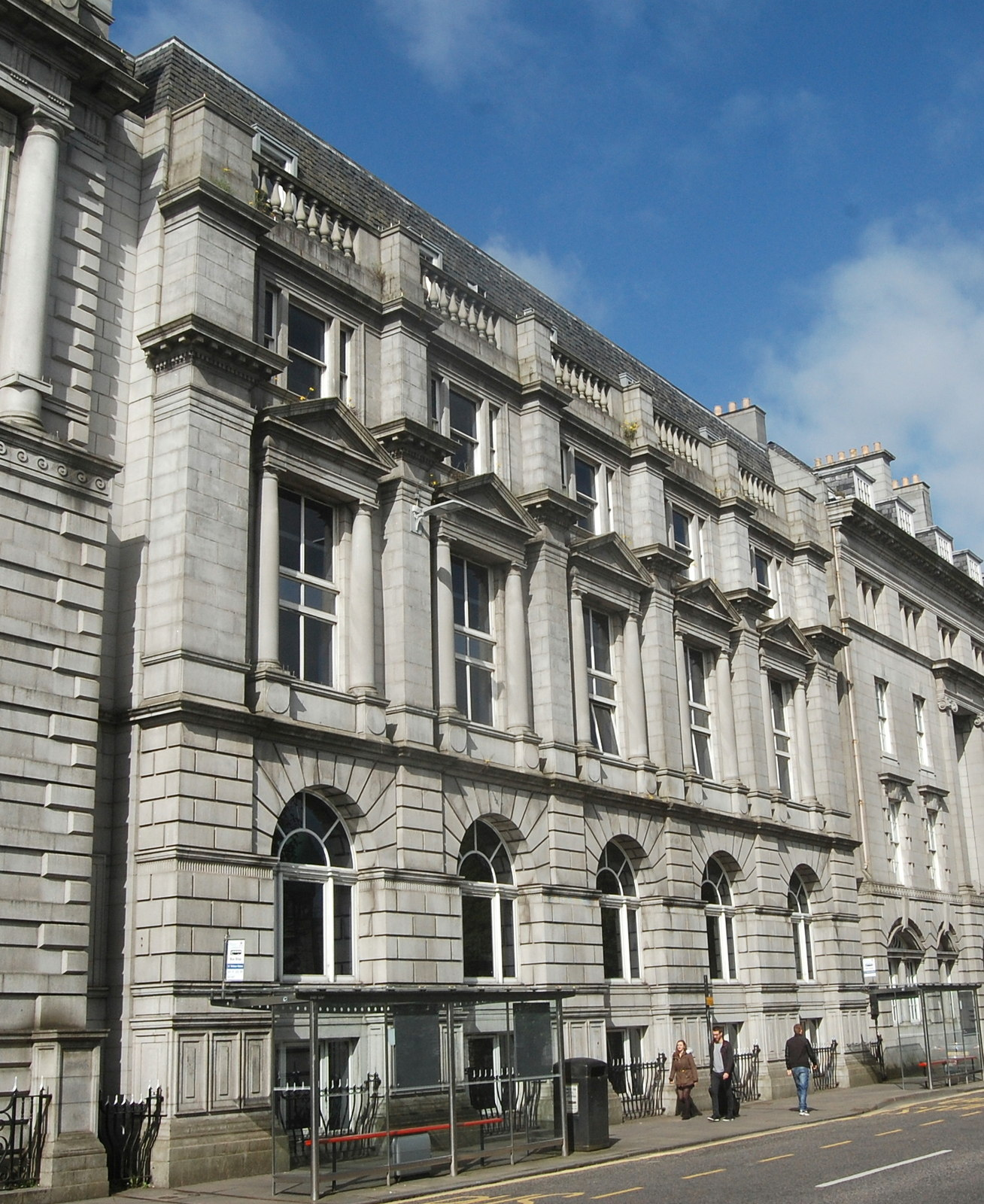
- 22 Union Terrace

- Shown in Aberdeen
- 57.1469°N 2.1049°W
- Location: Union Terrace, Aberdeen

History
- Built: 1896

Site notes
- Architect: Alexander Marshall Mackenzie
- Architectural style: Neoclassical style

Listed Building – Category B
- Official name: 22 Union Terrace
- Designated: 19 March 1984
- Reference no.: LB19980

Listed Building – Category B
- Official name: 20 Union Terrace
- Designated: 19 March 1984
- Reference no.: LB19979

Listed Building – Category B
- Official name: 25 Union Terrace
- Designated: 19 March 1984
- Reference no.: LB19981

County Buildings is a municipal structure in Union Terrace, Aberdeen, Scotland. The structure, which was the headquarters of Aberdeenshire County Council and was later converted for commercial use as Denburn House, comprises three separate structures all of which are Category B listed buildings.

== History ==
Following the implementation of the Local Government (Scotland) Act 1889, which established county councils in every county, the new county leaders decided to acquire offices for Aberdeenshire County Council. The site they selected, which faced Union Terrace Gardens, was developed in the late 19th century. The earliest part of the development was No. 22 Union Terrace which was designed by Alexander Marshall Mackenzie in the neoclassical style, built in granite and was completed in 1896. The design involved a symmetrical main frontage with five bays facing onto Union Terrace. The ground floor, which was rusticated, featured five round headed openings with voussoirs; the first floor featured five aediculae formed by sash windows flanked by Doric order columns supporting entablatures and pediments, while the second floor featured five tripartite windows. At roof level, there was balustraded parapet.

An adjacent building to the southeast, No. 20 Union Terrace, was commissioned by the local parish council. It was also designed by Mackenzie in a similar style and was completed the following year. The complex was further expanded to the northwest when No. 25 Union Terrace was commissioned by The Scottish Life Assurance Company. It was designed by Sydney Mitchell and George Wilson in a similar style and completed in 1902. Although the county clerk's office and the education department remained in No. 22, in due course, the county council expanded into Nos. 20 and 25 with the county treasurer's office in No. 20 and welfare, housing, sanitary and weights and measures offices in No. 25. The whole complex became known as "County Buildings".

Following the abolition of Aberdeenshire County Council in 1975, the three buildings were made available for commercial use. In the 1980s, the complex was re-developed with a concrete framed structure erected behind the original façade and the complex was renamed Denburn House to recall the Denburn Valley in which the complex was located. The complex was then acquired by a joint venture of GE Capital and Urbina in 2006 and refurbished for use by the main tenant, Lloyd's Register.

After Lloyd's Register vacated the complex, a developer, Mandale Homes, secured planning consent, in April 2022, to convert it into 72 residential units, comprising 58 flats and 14 studio apartments, amidst concerns that the smaller flats would be "barely habitable". Between 2022 and 2022, the gardens in front of the complex were extensively landscaped by Balfour Beatty on behalf of Aberdeen City Council.

== See also ==
- List of listed buildings in Aberdeen/4
- List of listed buildings in Aberdeen/5
- List of listed buildings in Aberdeen/7
