= Sinking of the Oscar =

Shipwreck off the Scottish Coast

Coordinates: 57°08′25.4″N 2°03′4.3″W

The wreck of the Oscar
- Date: 1 April 1813
- Location: by Girdleness, Aberdeen
- Outcome: loss of over 40 lives, ship lost, community in mourning, and eventual building of Girdleness Lighthouse
- Deaths: all crew, apart from two survivors

The Oscar was a whaling ship that was wrecked near Aberdeen, Scotland, on 1 April 1813. It was so close to the shore that families helplessly watched the ship's men struggle and (all but two) drown, a few yards from safety. This disaster led to community funding for the bereaved families and is known in poem and art. It resulted in changes to bring safety in a new lighthouse for the headland, and a street in Torry (above the wreck scene at Greyhope Bay) was named Oscar Road.

== Loss of ship and lives ==
The Oscar was a whaling ship based in Aberdeen, Scotland, one of many undertaking the perilous and long journeys to Antarctica to participate in this highly dangerous but lucrative industry. In the night before 1 April 1813, five ships lay at anchor outside the harbour: Oscar, St. Andrews, Hercules, Latona, and Middleton. Crew of the first two were on shore leave, so they came in closer to the shore to facilitate their return. This proved to be a deadly mistake in the case of the Oscar's Captain, John Innes.

This unfortunate reason for the ship being so near the rocks is described by William Cadenhead in his poem, "The wreck of the Oscar":

Sometimes we tacked about the bay with very little offing,
To wait a boat that was to bring some laggards of the crew,
For, heedless of the danger, some men will still keep loafing,
And this delay brought wild dismay, as soon they sadly knew."

After an unusually long calm period, the wind suddenly veered from westerly to south-east then north-east in large snowy squalls which hit the ships, who then put out to sea to ride out the storm; the second squall hit the Oscar as she was closest to the shore, but her crew had only just returned aboard, and the anchor was still in place. The force of the sudden storm and high waves and tidal current all caused Oscar to drag onto the rocks below Girdleness and rapidly take on water, and after about six hours of struggle, the Oscar was aground on the rocks of Greyhope Bay. Pounded by high waves, she broke up quickly. So nearly on the shore, the crew had tried to cut the main mast to make a bridge to escape but it fell wrongly, killing the men who had been on the rigging. Captain Innes called out for help to the crowd watching from shore, but the families of the crew could do nothing to mount a rescue in those conditions, and had to watch almost all their men drown before their eyes, and then collect their bodies from the shore over the days following. There is some dispute about how many lives were lost, with crew stated as 44[note: some references refer to 45 or 43], but it is clear that only two men survived, John Jameson (or Jamson) and James Venus. Cadenhead's poem is imagined in the words of one of the survivors, remembering the horrible event and mourning the losses:

Twas a sad scene this lone churchyard beside the moaning billows
After the storm, the cast-ashores among the graves were laid,
Their sailor garbs their winding sheets, the wet green graves their pillows,
That lovers and relations might claim their hapless dead.

Scotland's so called "worst poet", William McGonagall, famous for his poem on the Tay Bridge Disaster, also wrote about this terrible event in April 1888, in "The Wreck of the Whaler Oscar" which begins

'TWAS on the 1st of April, and in the year of Eighteen thirteen,
That the whaler "Oscar" was wrecked not far from Aberdeen;
'Twas all on a sudden the wind arose, and a terrific blast it blew,
And the "Oscar" was lost, and forty-two of a gallant crew.

McGonnagall's last verse, whilst awkwardly put, refers readers to the risks all seamen had to bear:

And also think of the mariners while you lie down to sleep,
And pray to God to protect them while on the briny deep,
For their hardships are many, and hard to endure,
There's only a plank between them and a watery grave, which makes their lives unsure.

== Aftermath and response ==
There was a large grave burial at St Fittick Churchyard, and 18-year-old John Coutts is buried in St Nicholas Churchyard in Union Terrace. The families were comforted by minister Dr. Cruden of Nigg, and two 19-year-old brothers, James and Thomas Sangster, were from Peterhead, are buried in Nigg, along with James Christie, aged 21, and George Macdonald, aged 27. One linesman (who ensured the safety of men aboard when the whale-lines were in use,) John Henderson, aged 21, was buried in Newburgh Churchyard with an epitaph from his son, and a stone was erected there to Captain Innes by his wife Ann Mitchell, although the exact location of his grave is unknown; others with unknown resting places are George and Thomas Buchan, James Catto, and Thomas Greig.

The people of Aberdeen rallied in support of the bereaved raising a fund of £12,000. A chapbook was created to help the fundraising called the Melancholy loss of the Oscar, of Aberdeen, 1 April 1813, describing in detail the wrecking and the reaction, speaking of lives lost to "the merciless sea", of men nearly reaching the shore but being "swept off by the heavy surf, or borne down by the casks and other wreck by which they were surrounded" and tells of men signalling in vain for nearby help that could not "possibly be afforded":

Thus perished the Oscar, which but a few hours before, had sailed with the fairest prospect, and all her equipments; and thus was lost one of the finest and best disciplined crews which could go to sea - men who so lately set out full of hope and expectation and were in one fatal hour cut off.

It lists the late crew and their roles, and says that they were mostly married men some with large families, and a printed version is in the National Library of Scotland.

A local story was told of one poor widow who lost "all" – her husband and three sons – on the Oscar and was seen begging in the Torry area, but was supported by local people who shared her grief. Argument that the crew had returned inebriated and so were ineffective to manage the ship has also been made and is discussed in school worksheets where this is stated as the cause of the disaster, referring to another poem published in the Aberdeen Journal on 7 April 1813.

The estimated financial loss to the ship's insurers was £10,000.

== Further losses ==
Two years later, the same or near location was the site of the loss of two further ships and loss of all their crews, the Caledonia and the Thames.

== Long term legacy of the Oscar ==
The shipmaster [harbourmaster] of Aberdeen requested a lighthouse after the wreck of the Oscar.

The Harbour Commissioners, and the Shipmasters Society brought pressure to bear on the Commissioners of Northern Lights, which led to a meeting in July 1813, but a lighthouse request was denied with the reason given as, "the Harbour from its present situation on almost a straight line of coast, at the entrance of a rapid River, and exposed to the whole Fetch of the German Ocean can never be so improved as to become the general resort of shipping in a storm". Pressure from Aberdeen continued to no avail until the Lord Provost Hadden took a petition in person to the Commissioners on 9 January 1930, which resulted in establishing a sub-committee to take the project forwards, surveying the site from sea to choose the most visible location. The design was commissioned from lighthouse engineer Robert Stevenson (grandfather of author Robert Louis Stevenson) and built was by another Scot, John Gibb, in 1833. A foghorn was added in 1902. The Girdleness Light remains in use to today, and is a key landmark of Aberdeen, but the light itself was automated in 1991.

On the bi-centenary of the disaster, it was remembered in the press and a local gala had an exhibition on the event and its legacy. Oscar's story is still told in schools.
