= Union Terrace =

Union Terrace may refer to:

- Union Terrace, Aberdeen, a street in Scotland
  - Union Terrace Gardens, public park located next to the above
