= List of William McGonagall poems =

This is a list of poems by William McGonagall that have been published in book form, either during the poet's life or subsequently. A number of others only appeared in broadsheets or in local newspapers and do not appear in this list.

Published Works by William McGonagall
Title	Year/month written	First published in	Publication year	Subject
A Christmas Carol	1884-12	Poetic Gems [First Series]	1890	
A Descriptive Poem on the Silvery Tay	1877-??	More Poetic Gems	1962	River Tay
A Humble Heroine	1899-09	More Poetic Gems	1962	Agnes Reston
A New Temperance Poem, in Memory of my Departed Parents	1885-10	Last Poetic Gems	1968	
A New Year's Resolution to Leave Dundee	1893-01	Last Poetic Gems	1968	
A Requisition To The Queen	1877-09	Last Poetic Gems	1968	
A Soldier's Reprieve	1893-01	More Poetic Gems	1962	William Scott (The Sleeping Sentinel)
A Summary History of Lord Clive	1899-06	Last Poetic Gems	1968	Robert Clive
A Summary History of Sir William Wallace	1877-10	More Poetic Gems	1962	William Wallace
A Tale of Christmas Eve	1900-12	Last Poetic Gems	1968	
A Tale of Elsinore	1889-05	More Poetic Gems	1962	
A Tale of the Sea	1886-05	Poetic Gems [Second Series]	1891	
A Tribute to Dr. Murison	1885-08	Last Poetic Gems	1968	
A Tribute to Henry M Stanley	1890-06	Poetic Gems [Second Series]	1891	Henry Morton Stanley
A Tribute to Mr J. Graham Henderson, The World's Fair Judge	1893-03	Last Poetic Gems	1968	
A Tribute to Mr Murphy and the Blue Ribbon Army	1882-01	Poetic Gems [Second Series]	1891	Francis Murphy (evangelist)
Adventures of King Robert the Bruce	1887-07	Poetic Gems [Second Series]	1891	Robert the Bruce
An Address to Shakespeare	1877-09	More Poetic Gems	1962	William Shakespeare
An Address to the New Tay Bridge	1887-06	Poetic Gems [First Series]	1890	Tay Rail Bridge
An Address to the Rev. George Gilfillan	1877-07	More Poetic Gems	1962	George Gilfillan
An Adventure in the Life of King James V of Scotland	1887-11	Poetic Gems [Second Series]	1891	James V of Scotland
An All Night Sea Fight	1901-06	More Poetic Gems	1962	HMS Blanche (1786)
An Autumn Reverie	1886-11	Poetic Gems [First Series]	1890	
An Excursion Steamer Sunk in the Tay	1888-07	Last Poetic Gems	1968	
An Ode to the Queen	1877-09	More Poetic Gems	1962	Queen Victoria
An Ode to the Queen on her Jubilee Year	1887-06	Poetic Gems [First Series]	1890	Golden Jubilee of Queen Victoria
Annie Marshall the Foundling	1888-02	Poetic Gems [Second Series]	1891	
Attempted Assassination of the Queen	1882-05	Poetic Gems [First Series]	1890	Roderick Maclean
Baldovan Mansion	1886-12	Poetic Gems [Second Series]	1891	
Balmoral Castle	1878-07	Last Poetic Gems	1968	Balmoral Castle
Beautiful Aberfoyle	1893-03	Last Poetic Gems	1968	Aberfoyle, Stirling
Beautiful Balmerino	1898-??	Last Poetic Gems	1968	Balmerino
Beautiful Balmoral	1900-05	More Poetic Gems	1962	Balmoral Castle
Beautiful Comrie	1899-06	More Poetic Gems	1962	Comrie
Beautiful Crieff	1899-04	More Poetic Gems	1962	Crieff
Beautiful Edinburgh	1881-??	Last Poetic Gems	1968	Edinburgh
Beautiful Monikie	1890-07	Poetic Gems [Second Series]	1891	Monikie
Beautiful Nairn	1888-06	More Poetic Gems	1962	Nairn
Beautiful Newport on the Braes o' the Silvery Tay	1892-08	Last Poetic Gems	1968	Newport-on-Tay
Beautiful North Berwick	1899-06	More Poetic Gems	1962	North Berwick
Beautiful Rothesay	1892-08	Last Poetic Gems	1968	Rothesay, Bute
Beautiful Torquay	1902-??	More Poetic Gems	1962	Torquay
Bill Bowls the Sailor	1885-09	Poetic Gems [Second Series]	1891	
Bill Bowls, the Sailor	1885-09	Last Poetic Gems	1968	
Bonnie Callander	1892-09	More Poetic Gems	1962	Callander
Bonnie Dundee in 1878	1878-01	More Poetic Gems	1962	Dundee
Bonnie Kilmany	1892-09	More Poetic Gems	1962	Kilmany
Bonnie Montrose	1881-04	More Poetic Gems	1962	Montrose, Angus
Broughty Ferry	1886-12	Poetic Gems [Second Series]	1891	Broughty Ferry
Burning of the Exeter Theatre	1887-09	Poetic Gems [Second Series]	1891	Theatre Royal, Exeter
Calamity in London	1898-01	More Poetic Gems	1962	
Captain Teach alias "Black Beard"	1892-04	More Poetic Gems	1962	Blackbeard
Death and Burial of Lord Tennyson	1892-10	Last Poetic Gems	1968	Alfred, Lord Tennyson
Descriptive Jottings of London	1880-06	Poetic Gems [Second Series]	1891	London
Edinburgh	1895-06	Poetic Gems [First Series]	1890	Edinburgh
Farewell Address at the Argyle Hall	1880-06	Last Poetic Gems	1968	
Forget-Me-Not	1879-03	Poetic Gems [Second Series]	1891	
General Gordon, the Hero of Khartoum	1885-03	Poetic Gems	1934	Charles George Gordon
General Roberts in Afghanistan	1900-08	Last Poetic Gems	1968	Battle of Peiwar Kotal; Battle of Kandahar
Glasgow	1883-??	Poetic Gems [First Series]	1890	Glasgow
Grace Darling or The Wreck of the "Forfarshire"	1887-08	Poetic Gems [First Series]	1890	Grace Darling
Greenland's Icy Mountains	1886-05	Poetic Gems [First Series]	1890	Geography of Greenland
Grif, of the Bloody Hand	1887-09	Last Poetic Gems	1968	
Hanchen, The Maid of the Mill	1886-10	Poetic Gems	1934	
Jack Honest, or the Widow and her Son	1889-11	Last Poetic Gems	1968	
Jack o' the Cudgel	1885-06	Poetic Gems [Second Series]	1891	
Jack o' the Cudgel	1885-08	Poetic Gems [Second Series]	1891	
Jenny Carrister, The Heroine of Lucknow-Mine	1888-05	Poetic Gems	1934	
John Rouat the Fisherman	1888-02	Poetic Gems [Second Series]	1891	
Jottings of New York	1887-05	Poetic Gems [Second Series]	1891	New York City
Lines in Defence of the Stage	1895-??	More Poetic Gems	1962	
Lines in Memoriam Regarding the Entertainment I Gave on the 31st March, 1893, in Reform Street Hall, Dundee	1893-04	Last Poetic Gems	1968	
Lines in Praise of Mr. J. Graham Henderson, Hawick	1893-03	Last Poetic Gems	1968	
Lines in Praise of Professor Blackie	1895-04	Last Poetic Gems	1968	John Stuart Blackie
Lines in Praise of the Lyric Club Banquet	1894-09	Last Poetic Gems	1968	
Lines in Praise of Tommy Atkins	1899-11	More Poetic Gems	1962	Tommy Atkins
Lines in Reply to the Beautiful Poet who Welcomed News of McGonagall's Departure from Dundee	1893-01	Last Poetic Gems	1968	
Little Jamie	1878-??	More Poetic Gems	1962	
Little Pierre's Song	1887-08	Last Poetic Gems	1968	
Little Popeet: The Lost Child	1893-11	More Poetic Gems	1962	
Loch Katrine	1886-07	Poetic Gems [Second Series]	1891	Loch Katrine
Loch Leven	1886-12	Poetic Gems [Second Series]	1891	Loch Leven (Kinross)
Loch Ness	1878-06	More Poetic Gems	1962	Loch Ness
Lord Roberts' Triumphal Entry into Pretoria	1900-06	Last Poetic Gems	1968	
Lost on the Prairie	1893-12	More Poetic Gems	1962	
Mary, the Maid of the Tay	1878-11	More Poetic Gems	1962	
McGonagall's Ode to the King	1902-06	More Poetic Gems	1962	Edward VII
Montrose	Unknown	Poetic Gems [Second Series]	1891	Montrose, Angus
Nora, The Maid of Killarney	1894-03	More Poetic Gems	1962	
Oban	1886-06	Poetic Gems [First Series]	1890	Oban
Richard Pigott, the Forger	1889-04	More Poetic Gems	1962	Richard Pigott
Robert Burns	1877-09	Poetic Gems [Second Series]	1891	Robert Burns
Saved by Music	1884-01	Last Poetic Gems	1968	
Saving a Train	1883-02	Poetic Gems [First Series]	1890	
Saving a Train	1899-01	Last Poetic Gems	1968	
The Albion Battleship Calamity	1898-06	More Poetic Gems	1962	HMS Albion (1898)
The Ancient Town of Leith	1899-05	More Poetic Gems	1962	Leith
The Ashantee War	1902-01	Last Poetic Gems	1968	Anglo-Ashanti Wars
The Battle of Abu Klea	1885-02	Poetic Gems [First Series]	1890	Battle of Abu Klea
The Battle of Alexandria	1885-06	Last Poetic Gems	1968	Battle of Alexandria
The Battle of Atbara	1898-04	Last Poetic Gems	1968	Battle of Atbara
The Battle of Bannockburn	1877-09	Poetic Gems [First Series]	1890	Battle of Bannockburn
The Battle of Corunna	1900-08	Last Poetic Gems	1968	Battle of Corunna
The Battle of Cressy	1885-06	Poetic Gems	1934	Battle of Crécy
The Battle of Culloden	Unknown	Poetic Gems [Second Series]	1891	Battle of Culloden
The Battle of El-Teb	1884-03	Poetic Gems [First Series]	1890	First and Second Battles of El Teb
The Battle of Flodden Field	1884-08	Poetic Gems [First Series]	1890	Battle of Flodden
The Battle of Glencoe	1899-11	More Poetic Gems	1962	Battle of Talana Hill
The Battle of Gujrat	1901-08	Last Poetic Gems	1968	Battle of Gujrat
The Battle of Inkermann	1902-??	Last Poetic Gems	1968	Battle of Inkerman
The Battle of Omdurman	1898-09	Last Poetic Gems	1968	Battle of Omdurman
The Battle of Sheriffmuir	Unknown	Poetic Gems [Second Series]	1891	Battle of Sheriffmuir
The Battle of Shina, in Africa	1888-10	Poetic Gems	1934	
The Battle of Tel-el-Kebir	1882-10	Poetic Gems [First Series]	1890	Battle of Tell El Kebir
The Battle of the Alma	1885-01	Last Poetic Gems	1968	Battle of the Alma
The Battle of the Modder River	1899-12	McGonagall and Tommy Atkins	1975	Battle of Modder River
The Battle of the Nile	1886-09	Last Poetic Gems	1968	Battle of the Nile
The Battle of Toulouse	1902-??	McGonagall and Tommy Atkins	1975	Battle of Toulouse (1814)
The Battle of Waterloo	1884-06	More Poetic Gems	1962	Battle of Waterloo
The Beautiful City of Perth	1894-04	Last Poetic Gems	1968	Perth, Scotland
The Beautiful Sun	1883-06	Poetic Gems [First Series]	1890	Sun
The Beautiful Village of Penicuik	1900-05	More Poetic Gems	1962	Penicuik
The Black Watch Memorial	1887-11	More Poetic Gems	1962	
The Blind Girl	1893-10	Last Poetic Gems	1968	
The Bonnie Lass o' Dundee	1877-09	More Poetic Gems	1962	
The Bonnie Lass of Ruily	1892-04	More Poetic Gems	1962	
The Bonnie Sidlaw Hills	1892-08	More Poetic Gems	1962	Sidlaws
The Burial of Mr Gladstone	1898-05	More Poetic Gems	1962	William Ewart Gladstone
The Burial of the Reverend George Gilfillan	1878-08	Poetic Gems [First Series]	1890	George Gilfillan
The Burning of the People's Variety Theatre, Aberdeen	1896-??	Last Poetic Gems	1968	
The Burning of the Ship "Kent"	1900-09	More Poetic Gems	1962	Kent (1820 EIC ship)
The Burning of the Steamer "City of Montreal"	1888-01	Poetic Gems	1934	
The Burns Statue	1880-10	Last Poetic Gems	1968	Robert Burns (Steell)
The Capture of Havana	1900-07	More Poetic Gems	1962	Siege of Havana
The Capture of Lucknow	1885-04	Last Poetic Gems	1968	Siege of Lucknow
The Castle of Mains	1878-05	Poetic Gems [Second Series]	1891	Mains Castle
The Christmas Goose	1878-09	Poetic Gems [First Series]	1890	
The City of Perth	1878-??	More Poetic Gems	1962	Perth, Scotland
The Clepington Catastrophe	1884-03	Poetic Gems [Second Series]	1891	
The Collision in the English Channel	1888-11	Poetic Gems	1934	
The Convict's Return	1879-04	Last Poetic Gems	1968	
The Crucifixion of Christ	1890-06	Last Poetic Gems	1968	Crucifixion of Jesus
The Death of Captain Ward	1901-01	More Poetic Gems	1962	
The Death of Captain Webb	1883-08	The Real McGonagall	1948	Matthew Webb
The Death of Fred Marsden, the American Playwright	1888-06	Last Poetic Gems	1968	
The Death of John Brown	1883-08	The Real McGonagall	1948	John Brown (servant)
The Death of Lord and Lady Dalhousie	1887-12	Poetic Gems [First Series]	1890	John Ramsay, 13th Earl of Dalhousie
The Death of Prince Leopold	1884-04	Poetic Gems [First Series]	1890	Prince Leopold, Duke of Albany
The Death of the Old Mendicant	1879-06	Poetic Gems [Second Series]	1891	
The Death of the Queen	1901-01	More Poetic Gems	1962	Queen Victoria
The Death of the Rev. Dr. Wilson	1888-01	More Poetic Gems	1962	
The Demon Drink	1887-10	Last Poetic Gems	1968	
The Den o' Fowlis	1882-??	More Poetic Gems	1962	Liff, Angus
The Destroying Angel	1889-01	More Poetic Gems	1962	
The Disastrous Fire at Scarborough	1898-06	More Poetic Gems	1962	
The Downfall of Delhi	1901-04	Last Poetic Gems	1968	Siege of Delhi
The Execution of James Graham, Marquis of Montrose	1898-??	Poetic Gems [Second Series]	1891	James Graham, 1st Marquess of Montrose
The Fair Maid of Perth's House	1894-10	More Poetic Gems	1962	
The Famous Tay Whale	1884-01	Poetic Gems [First Series]	1890	Tay Whale
The First Grenadier of France	1887-08	Poetic Gems	1934	Théophile Corret de la Tour d'Auvergne
The Funeral of the German Emperor	1888-04	Poetic Gems [First Series]	1890	William I, German Emperor
The Funeral of the Late Ex-Provost Rough, Dundee	1888-12	Last Poetic Gems	1968	
The Funeral of the Late Prince Henry of Battenberg	1896-??	Last Poetic Gems	1968	Prince Henry of Battenberg
The Great Franchise Demonstration	1884-09	Last Poetic Gems	1968	
The Great Yellow River Inundation In China	1888-03	Last Poetic Gems	1968	1887 Yellow River flood
The Heatherblend Club Banquet	1894-10	More Poetic Gems	1962	
The Hero of Kalapore	1899-08	Last Poetic Gems	1968	William Alexander Kerr
The Hero of Rorke's Drift	1899-02	Last Poetic Gems	1968	Henry Hook (VC)
The Horrors of Majuba	1888-08	Poetic Gems	1934	Battle of Majuba Hill
The Inauguration of the Hill o' Balgay	1878-??	More Poetic Gems	1962	
The Inauguration of the University College, Dundee	1883-10	Last Poetic Gems	1968	University of Dundee
The Irish Convict's Return	1878-??	More Poetic Gems	1962	
The Kessack Ferry-Boat Fatality	1894-03	Last Poetic Gems	1968	Kessock Ferry
The Last Berkshire Eleven	1899-07	Last Poetic Gems	1968	Battle of Maiwand
The Late Sir John Ogilvy	1890-??	Poetic Gems [First Series]	1890	Sir John Ogilvy, 9th Baronet
The Little Match Girl	1894-01	More Poetic Gems	1962	
The Loss of the Victoria	1893-06	More Poetic Gems	1962	HMS Victoria (1887)
The Military Review by Lord Wolseley	1897-02	McGonagall and Tommy Atkins	1975	
The Miraculous Escape of Robert Allan, the Fireman	1888-10	Poetic Gems	1934	
The Moon	1878-12	Poetic Gems [First Series]	1890	Moon
The Newport Railway	1878-06	Poetic Gems [First Series]	1890	Newport Railway, Scotland
The Nithsdale Widow and her Son	1891-12	Poetic Gems [Second Series]	1891	
The Pennsylvania Disaster	1889-07	Poetic Gems	1934	Johnstown Flood
The Queen's Diamond Jubilee Celebrations	1897-05	More Poetic Gems	1962	
The Railway Bridge of the Silvery Tay	1877-08	Poetic Gems [First Series]	1890	Tay Rail Bridge
The Rattling Boy from Dublin	1878-10	Poetic Gems [First Series]	1890	
The Rebel Surprise Near Tamai	1885-04	Poetic Gems [Second Series]	1891	
The Relief of Ladysmith	1900-04	McGonagall and Tommy Atkins	1975	Relief of Ladysmith
The Relief of Mafeking	1900-06	More Poetic Gems	1962	Siege of Mafeking
The River of Leith	1895-09	Last Poetic Gems	1968	Water of Leith
The Royal Review	1881-09	Poetic Gems [Second Series]	1891	
The Siege of Seringapatam	1901-03	McGonagall and Tommy Atkins	1975	Siege of Seringapatam (1799)
The Sorrows of the Blind	1878-05	Poetic Gems [Second Series]	1891	
The Sprig of Moss	1889-12	Poetic Gems	1934	Alois Senefelder
The Storming of the Dargai Heights	1897-11	Last Poetic Gems	1968	Dargai
The Sunderland Calamity	1883-06	Last Poetic Gems	1968	Victoria Hall Disaster
The Tay Bridge Disaster	1880-01	Poetic Gems [First Series]	1890	Tay Bridge disaster
The Terrific Cyclone of 1893	1893-12	Last Poetic Gems	1968	
The Tragic Death of the Rev. A. H. Mackonochie	1887-12	Poetic Gems	1934	Alexander Mackonochie
The Troubles of Matthew Mahoney	1892-08	More Poetic Gems	1962	
The Village of Tayport and its Surroundings	1894-07	Last Poetic Gems	1968	Tayport
The Wreck of the "Abercrombie Robinson"	1892-05	More Poetic Gems	1962	
The Wreck of the "Columbine"	1886-03	Last Poetic Gems	1968	Betty Mouat
The Wreck of the "Indian Chief"	1899-10	More Poetic Gems	1962	
The Wreck of the "Thomas Dryden"	1881-10	Poetic Gems [First Series]	1890	
The Wreck of the Barque "Lynton"	1886-01	Last Poetic Gems	1968	
The Wreck of the Barque "Wm. Paterson" of Liverpool	1886-04	Poetic Gems	1934	
The Wreck Of The Steamer "London"	1882-11	Poetic Gems [First Series]	1890	SS London (1864)
The Wreck of the Steamer "Mohegan"	1898-11	Last Poetic Gems	1968	SS Mohegan
The Wreck of the Steamer "Stella"	1899-05	More Poetic Gems	1962	SS Stella (1890)
The Wreck of the Steamer "Storm Queen"	1889-01	Poetic Gems	1934	
The Wreck of the Whaler "Oscar"	1888-04	Poetic Gems	1934	The Wreck of the Oscar
To Mr James Scrymgeour, Dundee	1887-01	Poetic Gems [First Series]	1890	
Women's Suffrage	1884-10	Last Poetic Gems	1968	Women's suffrage in the United Kingdom
Wreck of the Schooner "Samuel Crawford"	1887-01	Poetic Gems	1934	
Young Munro the Sailor	1886-07	Poetic Gems [Second Series]	1891	

== Bibliography ==
- Poetic Gems [First Series]. Dundee: Winter, Duncan & Co. 1890. OCLC 316566087.
- Poetic Gems [Second Series]. Dundee: David Winter. 1891. OCLC 316648533.
- Poetic Gems. Dundee: David Winter. 1934. OCLC 181801214.
- The Real McGonagall. Glasgow: D. R. Burnside. 1948. OCLC 181682664.
- More Poetic Gems. Dundee: David Winter. 1962. OCLC 2219853.
- Last Poetic Gems. Dundee: David Winter. 1968. ISBN 9780715604144.
- McGonagall and Tommy Atkins. Dundee: David Winter. 1975. OCLC 810787452.
