= List of listed buildings in Aberdeen/7 =

This is a list of listed buildings in Aberdeen, Scotland.

== List ==
Name	Location	Date listed	Grid ref. (Note: Sometimes known as OSGB36, the grid reference (where provided) is based on the British national grid reference system used by the Ordnance Survey. • "Guide to National Grid". Ordnance Survey. • "Get-a-map". Ordnance Survey.)	Geo-coordinates	Notes	LB number (Note: Historic Environment Scotland assign a unique alphanumeric identifier to each designated site in Scotland, for listed buildings this always begins with "LB", for example "LB12345".)	Image
Seaton Park, Park Wall To Tillydrone Road				57°10′13″N 2°06′31″W	Category B	20063	Upload Photo
Westburn Road And Argyll Place, Victoria Park, Fountain				57°09′07″N 2°07′20″W	Category A	20065	Upload another image
King George VI Bridge Over River Dee, At Great Southern Road				57°07′42″N 2°06′29″W	Category B	20070	Upload another image See more images
Girdleness Lighthouse, Greyhope Road, Including Fog Signal At South Side At Nj 9724 0530				57°08′20″N 2°02′55″W	Category A	20078	Upload another image
Crown Terrace Baptist Church, Crown Terrace				57°08′39″N 2°06′08″W	Category B	19939	Upload Photo
Kings College Chapel, College Bounds				57°09′51″N 2°06′06″W	Category A	19943	Upload another image See more images
St Clements Street, East St Clement's Church And Churchyard Including Boundary Wall				57°08′49″N 2°04′58″W	Category B	19954	Upload another image See more images
St. Machar's Cathedral, Gate Lodges, Chanonry				57°10′09″N 2°06′11″W	Category B	19959	Upload another image See more images
Lecture Hall Of Geography Department, High Street, Old Aberdeen				57°09′59″N 2°06′09″W	Category B	19965	Upload Photo
13-15 (Odd Numbers) Fonthill Terrace, Including Railings				57°08′09″N 2°06′31″W	Category C(S)	46478	Upload Photo
Holburn Street At South Anderson Drive, Privies And Pantries (Former Tram Shelter And Public Lavatory)				57°07′27″N 2°07′18″W	Category C(S)	46480	Upload another image
Duthie Park, Bandstand				57°07′50″N 2°06′14″W	Category B	46777	Upload another image See more images
Duthie Park, Gordon Highlanders Obelisk Memorial				57°07′53″N 2°06′25″W	Category C(S)	46783	Upload another image See more images
North Esplanade West At Old Ford Road And Mouth Of Ferryhill Burn, March Stone A (Alpha)				57°08′19″N 2°05′41″W	Category C(S)	46796	Upload another image
27 Polmuir Road, Including Boundary Wall				57°08′04″N 2°06′11″W	Category C(S)	46797	Upload Photo
88 Cornhill Road, Gannochy, Including Boundary Walls				57°09′23″N 2°07′47″W	Category C(S)	46984	Upload Photo
14 King's Gate, King's Lodge, Including Gatepiers, And Boundary Walls				57°08′53″N 2°07′57″W	Category C(S)	46993	Upload Photo
42 And 42A Belgrave Terrace, Including Boundary Walls				57°08′52″N 2°07′09″W	Category C(S)	47456	Upload Photo
46 Belgrave Terrace, Apardion House, Including Gatepiers, Boundary Walls And Railings				57°08′51″N 2°07′10″W	Category C(S)	47458	Upload Photo
1-5 (Odd Numbers) Desswood Place And 3 And 7 Whitehall Road, Including Boundary Wall				57°08′44″N 2°07′24″W	Category C(S)	47466	Upload Photo
10 And 12 Westfield Terrace, Including Gates And Boundary Walls				57°08′50″N 2°07′19″W	Category C(S)	47501	Upload Photo
66 Forest Road, Including Gatepiers And Boundary Walls				57°08′46″N 2°08′12″W	Category C(S)	47926	Upload Photo
367 Great Western Road, Including Boundary Walls				57°08′03″N 2°07′43″W	Category C(S)	48516	Upload Photo
Bridge Place, Former Palace Theatre				57°08′40″N 2°06′06″W	Category C(S)	48579	Upload Photo
Footdee, No 3 North Square				57°08′38″N 2°04′20″W	Category C(S)	50938	Upload Photo
Footdee, No 15 South Square				57°08′35″N 2°04′13″W	Category C(S)	50942	Upload Photo
Millburn Street And Crown Street, Hydro-Electric Board Offices And Warehousing				57°08′21″N 2°06′00″W	Category C(S)	45664	Upload Photo
2 Rubislaw Den South At Forest Road, Including, Gatepiers And Boundary Walls				57°08′35″N 2°08′03″W	Category B	20795	Upload Photo
32 Rubislaw Den South, Including Gatepiers And Boundary Walls				57°08′34″N 2°08′20″W	Category B	20807	Upload Photo
34 Rubislaw Den South, Including Gatepiers And Boundary Walls				57°08′34″N 2°08′21″W	Category B	20808	Upload Photo
Eday Road Woodend Hospital Staff Home				57°08′54″N 2°10′29″W	Category B	20828	Upload Photo
22 Forest Road, Including Gatepiers And Boundary Walls				57°08′37″N 2°08′05″W	Category B	20701	Upload Photo
1 Queen's Road, St Joseph's Roman Catholic Primary School				57°08′33″N 2°07′41″W	Category B	20708	Upload Photo
5 Queen's Road, St Joseph's Roman Catholic Primary School				57°08′33″N 2°07′41″W	Category C(S)	20710	Upload Photo
17 Queen's Road, Albyn School For Girls, Including Gatepiers And Boundary Walls				57°08′31″N 2°07′52″W	Category C(S)	20716	Upload Photo
78 Queen's Road, Including Gatepiers And Boundary Walls				57°08′28″N 2°08′19″W	Category C(S)	20747	Upload Photo
102 Queen's Road, Serena				57°08′24″N 2°08′36″W	Category B	20755	Upload Photo
18 Rubislaw Den North, Including Gatepiers And Boundary Walls				57°08′42″N 2°08′15″W	Category C(S)	20772	Upload Photo
26 Rubislaw Den North, Including Gatepiers And Boundary Walls				57°08′41″N 2°08′19″W	Category C(S)	20776	Upload Photo
60 Rubislaw Den North, Including Gatepiers And Boundary Walls				57°08′40″N 2°08′29″W	Category B	20780	Upload Photo
92 Queen's Road, Hamewith, Including Gatepiers And Boundary Walls				57°08′26″N 2°08′28″W	Category B	20638	Upload Photo
St Luke's (Gordon Highlanders Museum) Viewfield Road				57°08′15″N 2°08′46″W	Category B	20640	Upload another image See more images
Queen Street And West North Street, Queen Street Church (Church Of Scotland)				57°08′59″N 2°05′41″W	Category B	20644	Upload Photo
Union Street, 393-399 (Odd Nos)				57°08′37″N 2°06′31″W	Category B	20543	Upload Photo
Union Street, 423, 425				57°08′36″N 2°06′35″W	Category C(S)	20546	Upload Photo
46-50 (Even Nos) Union Street, Union Chambers				57°08′50″N 2°05′48″W	Category C(S)	20550	Upload Photo
60 And 62 Union Street, Clydesdale Bank				57°08′50″N 2°05′51″W	Category B	20552	Upload Photo
Union Street, 150 And 1 Diamond Street				57°08′44″N 2°06′11″W	Category B	20559	Upload Photo
208-210 Union Street				57°08′41″N 2°06′21″W	Category B	20565	Upload Photo
218 Union Street				57°08′41″N 2°06′22″W	Category C(S)	20567	Upload Photo
Union Street, 226 And 228				57°08′41″N 2°06′24″W	Category C(S)	20570	Upload Photo
44 And 46 Upperkirkgate				57°08′55″N 2°05′56″W	Category C(S)	20583	Upload Photo
48-58 (Even Nos) Upperkirkgate				57°08′55″N 2°05′56″W	Category C(S)	20584	Upload Photo
13 Victoria Street, Including Boundary Wall				57°08′37″N 2°06′48″W	Category C(S)	20588	Upload Photo
North Silver Street, 19				57°08′49″N 2°06′23″W	Category C(S)	20488	Upload Photo
North Silver Street 6, 8				57°08′48″N 2°06′20″W	Category B	20491	Upload Photo
North Silver Street, 21				57°08′50″N 2°06′22″W	Category B	20497	Upload Photo
Old Aberdeen, High Street, 10, 12 Thom's Place				57°09′57″N 2°06′11″W	Category B	20513	Upload Photo
47 And 49 Union Street				57°08′49″N 2°05′46″W	Category C(S)	20517	Upload Photo
Union Street, 173, 173A				57°08′43″N 2°06′09″W	Category B	20529	Upload Photo
54 King's Gate, Atholl Hotel, Including Gatepiers And Boundary Walls				57°08′50″N 2°08′11″W	Category B	20413	Upload Photo
Mackie Place, Gatepiers				57°08′49″N 2°06′43″W	Category C(S)	20420	Upload Photo
22-26 (Even Nos) Marischal Street				57°08′50″N 2°05′35″W	Category B	20435	Upload Photo
44 Marischal Street				57°08′49″N 2°05′33″W	Category B	20439	Upload Photo
60 And 62 Marischal Street				57°08′47″N 2°05′31″W	Category B	20443	Upload Photo
57 Queen's Road, Hamilton School, Including Gatepiers And Boundary Walls				57°08′27″N 2°08′10″W	Category B	20457	Upload Photo
Angusfield House Queen's Road, 226				57°08′28″N 2°09′21″W	Category C(S)	20460	Upload Photo
49 And 51 Regent Quay				57°08′48″N 2°05′24″W	Category B	20466	Upload Photo
Golden Square, 16				57°08′46″N 2°06′21″W	Category B	20327	Upload Photo
High Street, 1. (West Side) College Place, Old Aberdeen				57°09′52″N 2°06′08″W	Category B	20344	Upload Photo
High Street, 43, (West Side) Old Aberdeen				57°09′56″N 2°06′08″W	Category B	20356	Upload Photo
High Street, 81 (West Side) Old Aberdeen				57°09′58″N 2°06′11″W	Category A	20360	Upload another image See more images
High Street, 97 (West Side) Old Aberdeen, St Machar Bar				57°10′00″N 2°06′09″W	Category B	20363	Upload Photo
High Street, 68 (East Side) Old Aberdeen				57°09′57″N 2°06′07″W	Category B	20369	Upload Photo
High Street, 104 (East Side) Greenlaw Court Old Aberdeen				57°10′01″N 2°06′08″W	Category B	20376	Upload Photo
Don Street, 74 (East Side) Old Aberdeen				57°10′07″N 2°05′57″W	Category B	20293	Upload Photo
Don Street (S.E. Side) Brig House				57°10′39″N 2°06′00″W	Category B	20307	Upload Photo
College Bounds, 53 (West Side) Old Aberdeen				57°09′51″N 2°06′11″W	Category B	20221	Upload Photo
Constitution Street, Beach Court Care Home, (Former St Peter's R.C. Infant School) Including Boundary Wall And Gate Piers				57°09′05″N 2°05′17″W	Category C(S)	20238	Upload Photo
Crown Street, 85, Masonic Temple				57°08′36″N 2°06′07″W	Category B	20243	Upload Photo
Crown Street, 145				57°08′29″N 2°06′03″W	Category B	20246	Upload Photo
Don Street, 19 (West Side) Old Aberdeen				57°10′03″N 2°06′07″W	Category B	20274	Upload Photo
3 Carden Terrace, Including Boundary Walls				57°08′41″N 2°07′06″W	Category C(S)	20159	Upload Photo
4 Carden Terrace, Including Boundary Walls				57°08′40″N 2°07′07″W	Category C(S)	20160	Upload Photo
5 Castle Street (Former Clydesdale Bank)				57°08′53″N 2°05′38″W	Category A	20162	Upload another image
Chanonry, 2 (East Side) Old Aberdeen				57°10′03″N 2°06′08″W	Category B	20178	Upload Photo
14A Chanonry, Old Aberdeen				57°10′09″N 2°06′07″W	Category B	20195	Upload Photo
Chanonry, 15 Castleton House, Old Aberdeen				57°10′09″N 2°06′06″W	Category B	20196	Upload Photo
College Bounds, 3 (West Side) Old Aberdeen				57°09′42″N 2°06′06″W	Category B	20207	Upload Photo
College Bounds, 21 (West Side) Old Aberdeen				57°09′45″N 2°06′07″W	Category B	20212	Upload Photo
College Bounds, 23 (West Side) Old Aberdeen				57°09′45″N 2°06′07″W	Category B	20213	Upload Photo
28 Albyn Place, Conservative Club, Including Gatepiers And Boundary Walls				57°08′34″N 2°07′15″W	Category B	20121	Upload Photo
1 And 3 Belmont Street And 7 Denburn Road				57°08′46″N 2°06′04″W	Category B	20127	Upload Photo
Robert Gordon's Institute Of Technology, School Of Navigation, 352 King Street				57°09′20″N 2°05′38″W	Category B	20090	Upload Photo
Bon Accord Street, Ferryhill House Hotel (Formerly Ferryhill House), Including Gatepiers And Boundary Walls				57°08′17″N 2°06′16″W	Category B	20100	Upload Photo
14, 15 And 16 Regent Quay, Harbour Offices				57°08′47″N 2°05′36″W	Category B	19986	Upload Photo
Head Post Office, Crown Street And Dee Street				57°08′39″N 2°06′12″W	Category B	19987	Upload another image
Princewall House 50 Huntly Street				57°08′45″N 2°06′28″W	Category B	19994	Upload Photo
25-30 (Inclusive Nos) Castle Street, 3 Castle Street, 6-14 (Even Nos) Justice Street And 1-5 (Inclusive Nos) Castle Hill, Salvation Army Citadel				57°08′54″N 2°05′30″W	Category B	19996	Upload another image See more images
Edward Vii, Statue, Junction Of Union Street And Union Terrace				57°08′45″N 2°06′08″W	Category B	20004	Upload Photo
Wallace, William, Union Terrace And Rosemount Viaduct				57°08′52″N 2°06′17″W	Category B	20012	Upload Photo
March Stone No. 46 On The Farm Of Westerton Of Auchmill On The West Side Of The Road About 50 Yards South-East Of The Farm				57°10′16″N 2°10′07″W	Category B	20026	Upload another image
March Stone No. 48 On North Side Of Marchburn Drive At Its Junction With Oldtown Place				57°10′09″N 2°09′30″W	Category B	20028	Upload another image
March Stone No. 55, At Back Entrance To Central Park On North Side Of Back Hilton Road				57°09′39″N 2°07′06″W	Category B	20035	Upload another image
March Stone No. 63, Golf Road At Rear Entrance To Pittodrie Football Ground				57°09′33″N 2°05′10″W	Category B	20043	Upload another image
March Stone On South Bank Of River Don At The Outlet Of The Powis Burn, Just Off The Esplanade				57°10′26″N 2°05′03″W	Category B	20046	Upload another image
March Stone Cr In Alford Lane Forming Quoin On Rear Gable Of Holburn Central Church				57°08′32″N 2°06′45″W	Category B	20047	Upload another image
Langstane, Within Wall Of 10 Langstane Place				57°08′41″N 2°06′17″W	Category B	20051	Upload Photo
Bridge Street Viaduct Over Windmill Brae				57°08′42″N 2°06′06″W	Category B	20074	Upload Photo
Belmont Street, Former St Nicholas Congregational Church				57°08′49″N 2°06′06″W	Category A	19937	Upload another image
Great Western Road At Ashley Park Drive, Holburn West Church (Church Of Scotland)				57°08′12″N 2°07′22″W	Category B	19942	Upload another image See more images
33 King Street, Aberdeen Arts Centre				57°08′58″N 2°05′39″W	Category A	19946	Upload another image
Rosemount Church (C. Of S.), Rosemount Terrace, Caroline Place And Westburn Road				57°09′11″N 2°06′44″W	Category C(S)	19949	Upload another image
Holburn Street, Ruthrieston South Church (Church Of Scotland) And Hall, Including Gates, Gatepiers And Boundary Walls				57°07′44″N 2°07′01″W	Category B	19950	Upload another image
Ruthrieston West Church (C. Of S.), Broomhill Road				57°07′42″N 2°07′39″W	Category B	19951	Upload another image
Carden Place At Albert Terrace, St Mary's Church (Episcopal), Including Gatepiers And Boundary Walls				57°08′40″N 2°07′10″W	Category A	19964	Upload another image See more images
Concert Hall, Advocates' Hall				57°08′54″N 2°05′42″W	Category A	19977	Upload another image See more images
22 Union Terrace				57°08′49″N 2°06′17″W	Category B	19980	Upload another image
Fonthill Road At Hardgate, Ferryhill Library				57°08′14″N 2°06′48″W	Category B	46474	Upload another image
1-5 (Odd Numbers) Fonthill Road, Cowdray Club, Fonthill Lodge Nursing Home, Including Boundary Walls And Railings				57°08′12″N 2°06′21″W	Category C(S)	46789	Upload Photo
South College Street And Palmerston Road, Railway Viaduct, The Arches				57°08′19″N 2°05′50″W	Category C(S)	46801	Upload Photo
Gregness Gardens At Girdleness Road, Edward VIII Pillar Box				57°07′50″N 2°05′00″W	Category B	47266	Upload another image
25-31 (Odd Numbers) Belgrave Terrace, Including Boundary Walls				57°08′51″N 2°07′06″W	Category C(S)	47454	Upload Photo
Desswood Place At Prince Arthur Street, Edward VIII Pillar Box				57°08′45″N 2°07′25″W	Category B	47478	Upload another image
496-502 (Even Numbers) Union Street				57°08′35″N 2°06′43″W	Category C(S)	47497	Upload Photo
Queen's Cross, Queen's Road, St Swithin Street And Queen's Lane South, Gates, Gatepiers And Boundary Walls To St Joseph's Roman Catholic Primary School,				57°08′34″N 2°07′38″W	Category B	47931	Upload Photo
327 Great Western Road And 2 Salisbury Terrace, Including Gatepiers And Boundary Walls				57°08′06″N 2°07′34″W	Category C(S)	48515	Upload Photo
30 Salisbury Terrace, Including Boundary Walls				57°08′03″N 2°07′28″W	Category C(S)	48519	Upload Photo
16 Ashley Gardens, Ashley House, Including Boundary Walls				57°08′19″N 2°07′30″W	Category C(S)	48521	Upload Photo
Brick Terrace Within Bon-Accord Crescent Gardens				57°08′31″N 2°06′26″W	Category B	49361	Upload Photo
57 Thomson Street, 'Monte Rosa Cottage', Including Boundary Walls				57°09′05″N 2°07′15″W	Category B	49509	Upload Photo
Footdee, No 1 North Square				57°08′38″N 2°04′21″W	Category C(S)	50936	Upload Photo
King Street, Former School To South Of St Andrews Cathedral				57°08′56″N 2°05′34″W	Category C(S)	50948	Upload Photo
8 And 10 Trinity Street				57°08′43″N 2°05′54″W	Category C(S)	50956	Upload Photo
Great Western Road, Countesswells Road, Craigton Road, Mannofield Parish Church				57°07′55″N 2°08′15″W	Category C(S)	51979	Upload another image
Archive Block (Former Laundry), Former Aberdeen Royal Infirmary, Woolmanhill, Spa Street, Aberdeen				57°08′59″N 2°06′23″W	Category B	52238	Upload Photo
Boiler House, Outbuilding and Stack, Former Aberdeen Royal Infirmary, Woolmanhill, Spa Street, Aberdeen				57°08′56″N 2°06′23″W	Category B	52239	Upload another image
Former Porter's Lodge, Former Aberdeen Royal Infirmary, Woolmanhill, Aberdeen				57°08′57″N 2°06′19″W	Category B	52240	Upload Photo
Victoria Pavilion (Former Surgical Block), Former Aberdeen Royal Infirmary, Woolmanhill, Spa Street, Aberdeen				57°08′57″N 2°06′23″W	Category B	52241	Upload another image
Mount Stephen (Former Medical and Pathology Block), Former Aberdeen Royal Infirmary, Woolmanhill, Aberdeen				57°08′58″N 2°06′21″W	Category B	52242	Upload Photo
Pair of leading lights at Aberdeen Harbour, Sinclair Road, Torry, Aberdeen				57°08′22″N 2°04′31″W	Category B	52520	Upload another image
1-75 Gilcomstoun Land, Aberdeen, Excluding the Internal Areas Within Individual Residential Units				57°08′48″N 2°06′35″W	Category A	52522	Upload another image
1-48 Virginia Court, 1-108 Marischal Court, Castlehill, Aberdeen Excluding the Internal Areas Within Individual Residential Units				57°08′56″N 2°05′25″W	Category A	52523	Upload another image
1-72 Porthill Court, 1-126 Seamount Court, Shop Units at 152-158 (Even Numbers) Gallowgate, Including the Multi-Storey Car Park to West North Street, Gallowgate, Aberdeen, Excluding the Internal Areas Within All Individual Residential Units and the Internal Areas Within the Shop Units				57°09′09″N 2°05′56″W	Category A	52524	Upload another image
Piper Alpha Memorial, Hazlehead Park, Aberdeen				57°08′17″N 2°10′46″W	Category B	52621	Upload another image

== Key ==
The scheme for classifying buildings in Scotland is:

- Category A: "buildings of national or international importance, either architectural or historic; or fine, little-altered examples of some particular period, style or building type."
- Category B: "buildings of regional or more than local importance; or major examples of some particular period, style or building type, which may have been altered."
- Category C: "buildings of local importance; lesser examples of any period, style, or building type, as originally constructed or moderately altered; and simple traditional buildings which group well with other listed buildings."

In March 2016 there were 47,288 listed buildings in Scotland. Of these, 8% were Category A, and 50% were Category B, with the remaining 42% being Category C.

== See also ==
- List of listed buildings in Aberdeen
