= Peacock Visual Arts =

Arts organisation and printmaking studio in Aberdeen, Scotland

Peacock Visual Arts is an arts organisation and open-access printmaking studio in Aberdeen, Scotland. Founded in 1974 as Peacock Printmakers, it runs a fine art print studio, a darkroom, digital and editing facilities and a gallery, and is based in the Castlegate.

== History ==
Peacock Printmakers was set up in 1974 by graduates of Gray's School of Art, during a period of renewed interest in printmaking across Scotland; the founders had been taught by the printmaker Ian Fleming. It was established as an open-access workshop, on the principle that the equipment printmaking requires is too costly for artists to own individually.

The organisation occupies a former 18th-century workshop and an adjoining 19th-century church school in the Castlegate.

== Union Terrace Gardens project ==
In the 2000s Peacock Visual Arts and Aberdeen City Council developed plans for a contemporary arts centre in Union Terrace Gardens, designed by the London practice Brisac Gonzalez. The £13 million building received planning permission in 2008.

The scheme was abandoned in 2009 after the oil businessman Sir Ian Wood offered £50 million towards a larger redevelopment of the same site, which would have raised the sunken gardens to street level. Wood's intervention led to an international design competition, won by Diller Scofidio + Renfro with a £140 million proposal that was refused planning permission in 2012; a smaller scheme by LDA Design was recommended for approval in 2018.
