= Greyhope Bay =

Bay in Aberdeen, Scotland

Coordinates: 57°08′25″N 2°03′04″W

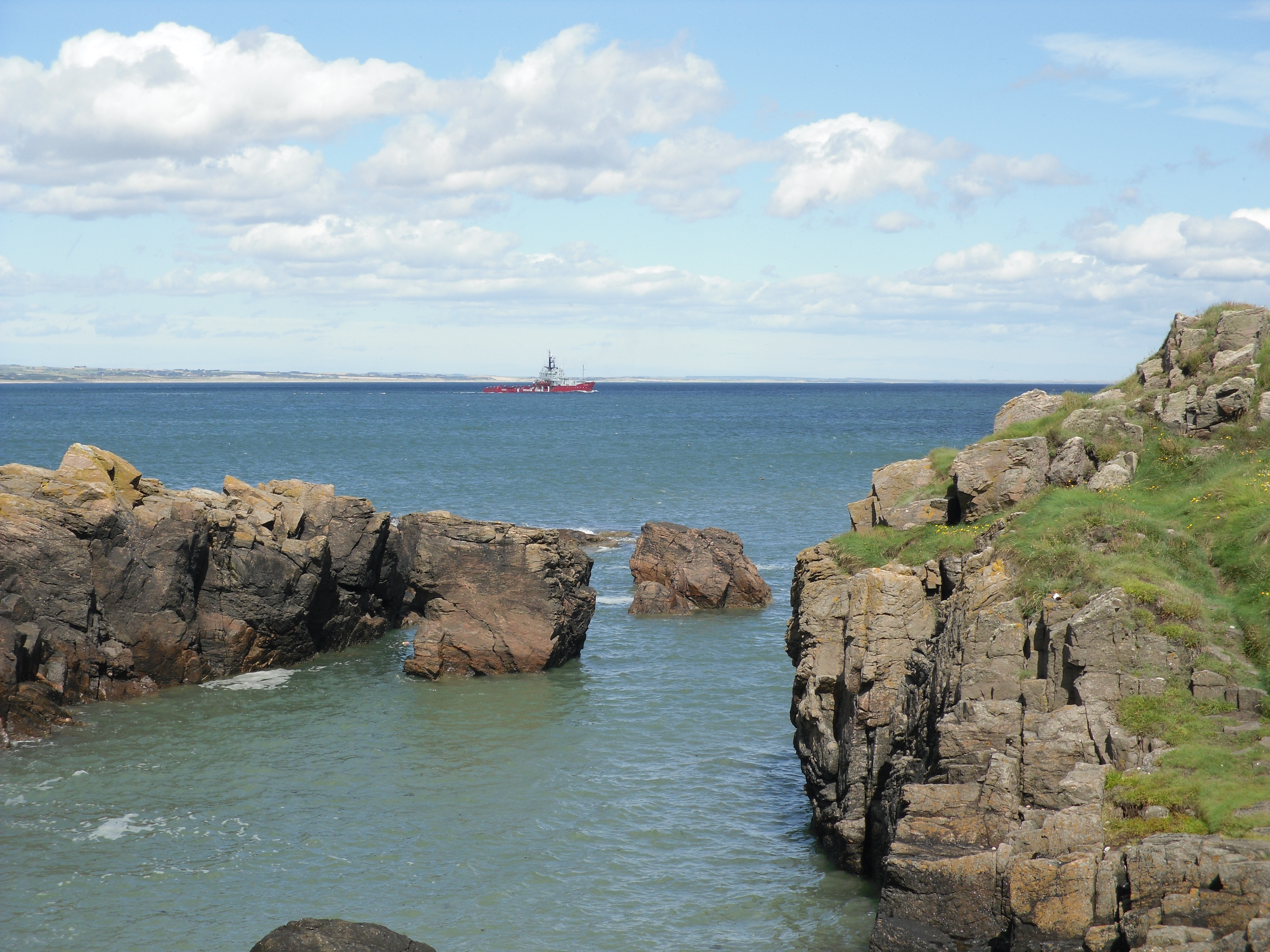
Greyhope Bay

Greyhope Bay is a bay in the city of Aberdeen in Scotland, near the entrance to Aberdeen Harbour. It is the site of Torry Battery.

In 1813, Greyhope Bay was the location of the wreck of the Oscar. The tragedy led to the construction of Girdle Ness Lighthouse at one end of the bay.

There are plans to establish a dolphin-watching site in the area of the bay.
