= Girdle Ness Lighthouse =

Lighthouse in Aberdeen, Scotland

Girdleness Lighthouse
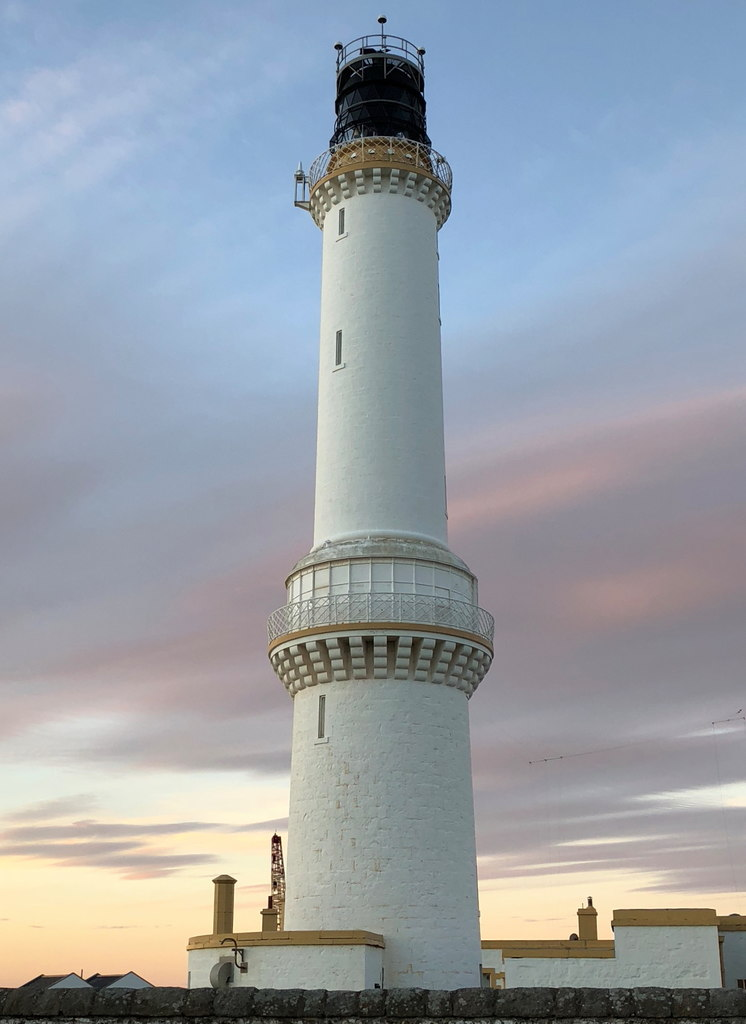
- Location: Balnagask, Aberdeen, Scotland
- OS grid: NJ9715905348
- Coordinates: 57°08′20″N 02°02′56″W

Tower
- Constructed: 1833
- Designed by: Robert Stevenson
- Automated: 1991
- Height: 37 metres (121 ft)
- Shape: tapered cylindrical tower
- Markings: white round tower, black lantern and orch trim
- Power source: mains electricity
- Operator: Northern Lighthouse Board
- Heritage: category A listed building
- Fog signal: Type Siren, 1 blast every 60s Operational from 1902–1987
- Racon: G(--o) 25M

Light
- First lit: 15 October 1833
- Focal height: 56 m (184 ft)
- Light source: Electric Rotating Mains Powered PAR 56 Optic
- Range: 22 nautical miles [41 km]
- Characteristic: Fl(2) W 20s 56m 12M Gridle Ness dome [Fl.0.5s-ec 2.0s; Fl.0.5-ec 17.0s]

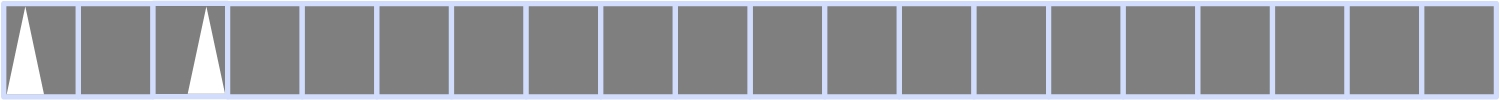

Girdle Ness Lighthouse (or Girdleness Lighthouse) is situated near Torry Battery on the Girdle Ness peninsula just south of the entrance to Aberdeen's harbour, in Scotland. It is an active light, managed by the Northern Lighthouse Board.

== Description ==
The tower is a tapering cylinder, painted white, with a watch room about a third of the way up. The lantern is black and there is a gallery. The tower is 37 metres (121 ft) tall and there are 182 steps to the lantern which produces two white flashes every 20 seconds. Adjacent is single-storey keepers' accommodation (which has been sold off) and ancillary buildings. DGPS is provided via two radio towers. The light was automated in 1991 and is continuously monitored on-line from the Northern Lighthouse Board headquarters in Edinburgh. There is no public access to the lighthouse. A racon was installed after 1968. It is a Category A listed building.

== History ==
In 1813 the whaler Oscar was blown ashore in a storm into Greyhope Bay, at the entrance to Aberdeen Harbour. Despite rescue attempts only two men of the forty four on board were saved. The disaster had nothing to do with the lack of a light – the crew were drunk and incapable – but there were strong calls for a lighthouse to be built on the headland above the bay and this was achieved twenty years later.

For the construction, the engineer was Robert Stevenson and the principal contractor was James Gibb. The construction was completed in 1833 and the light was first lit on 15 October– Alexander Slight became the resident inspector and Alan Stevenson the resident engineer. Originally sperm oil was used in eighteen Argand burners giving a fixed light at the focus of a 21 inches (530 mm) diameter silvered-copper parabolic reflector. In 1847 a dioptric light was installed and the previous lantern was transferred to Inchkeith Lighthouse. In 1870 paraffin was used experimentally. In 1890 the light was replaced by a single 200,000 candlepower revolving light. Until that time there had been a second level of thirteen lights with a similar reflector at the height of the watch room so as to display white lights at two levels. As a member of a Royal Commission the Astronomer Royal, George Airy, visited in 1860. He said it was "the best lighthouse that I have seen".

== Foghorn ==
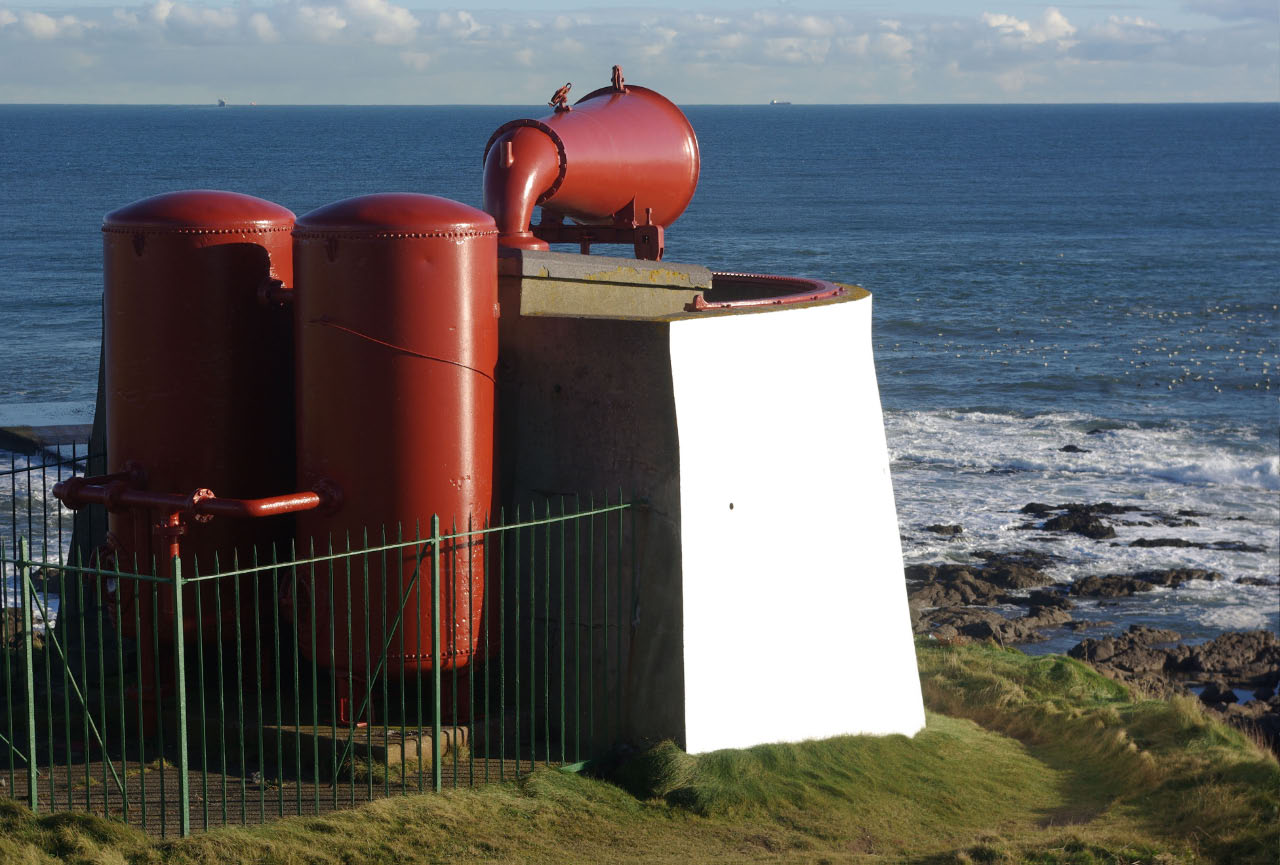
The "Torry Coo"

The associated foghorn at Girdle Ness was installed in 1902 in its current location by the Northern Lighthouse Board, which worked by using oil powered engines and compressed air stored in its two large tanks. The foghorn was first used from June 20, 1902 when visibility was less than 5 nautical miles (9.3 km; 5.8 mi). In calm weather, the foghorn could be heard across Aberdeen as well as up to 20 miles out to sea. Because of its low droning sound, the foghorn became known as the “Torry Coo”, alluding to the “Turra Coo”.

After 85 years of service, the Girdle Ness foghorn was one of eighteen foghorns around Scotland to be decommissioned by the Northern Lighthouse Board in 1987. Girdle Ness foghorn sounded for the final time at midday on November 30, 1987.

In 2003, demolition proposals by the Northern Lighthouse Board were met with outrage by local residents and Aberdeen City councillors, as well as groups including Historic Scotland and the Architectural Heritage Society of Scotland, among others.

Both the lighthouse and the foghorn remain protected as Category A listed structures.

== See also ==
- HMS Girdle Ness, Royal Navy missile trials ship, used for development of the Seaslug missile.
