= Ian Wood (businessman) =

Scottish businessman (1942–2026)

Sir Ian Wood KT GBE
- Wood in 2019
- Born: Ian Clark Wood; 21 July 1942; Aberdeen, Scotland
- Died: 26 July 2026 (aged 84); Aberdeen, Scotland
- Education: Robert Gordon's College; University of Aberdeen
- Occupation: Businessman
- Known for: CEO of Wood Group
- Spouse: Helen Wood
- Children: 3

Sir Ian Clark Wood (21 July 1942 – 26 July 2026) was a Scottish billionaire businessman. He was best known for his work in the North Sea oil industry with Wood Group, which he was largely responsible for transforming from a company of modest size, serving a primarily local market, to a large corporation with operations in over 50 countries. He served as Wood Group's chief executive from 1967 to 2006, and as chairman until 2012. Wood was one of Scotland's wealthiest people, with an estimated net worth of around £1.7 billion (2020).

In 2007, Wood and his immediate family set up The Wood Foundation, a venture philanthropy organisation.

== Early life and education ==
Ian Clark Wood was born in Aberdeen on 21 July 1942. He was educated at Robert Gordon's College, and then the University of Aberdeen, where he studied psychology and graduated in 1964.

== Career ==
After leaving university he joined the family business, becoming managing director in 1967. He was appointed Commander of the Order of the British Empire (CBE) in the 1982 New Year Honours and was knighted in the 1994 New Year Honours. He was appointed to the Order of the Thistle, Scotland's highest order of chivalry, in 2018.

Wood was awarded honorary doctorates by the University of Aberdeen in 1984, Robert Gordon University in Aberdeen in 1998, Glasgow Caledonian University in 2002, and Heriot-Watt University in 2012. He served as chancellor of Robert Gordon University from 2004.

In April 2010, Aberdeen City Council accepted his conditional investment of up to £85m (£50m confirmed, £35m pledged should the project exceed its budget), towards a £140m project to redesign Union Terrace Gardens. The project was supported by some local businesses though opposed by many local residents. The Union Terrace Gardens project was supported in a referendum but later rejected by the council.

In July 2012, Wood announced that he would retire as chairman of Wood Group, with Allister Langlands as his successor.

In 2014, Wood had a net worth of £1.32 billion. Wood was chairman of The Wood Foundation, investing in two areas of activity: making markets work for the poor in sub-Saharan Africa and developing young people in Scotland. The Foundation applies the principles of venture philanthropy, investing both money and expertise to achieve systemic change.

Wood was promoted to Knight Grand Cross of the Order of the British Empire (GBE) in the 2016 Birthday Honours for services to the oil and gas industry. In June 2018, he was appointed a Knight of the Order of the Thistle (KT) in the 2018 Birthday Honours.

According to the Sunday Times Rich List in 2020, Wood was worth an estimated £1.7 billion, a decrease of £54 million on the previous year.

Wood was a key player in the establishment of Aberdeen's Energy Transition Zone (ETZ), which involved the development of land in and around Torry to support renewable energy production at the city's south harbour, establishing the company ETZ Ltd. in 2021 to oversee the project. In October 2024, a group of local people mounted a legal challenge to ETZ Ltd.'s proposals, which will result in the loss of St. Fittick's Park, an area of environmental value and historic importance formerly zoned as green belt. The petition was refused by the Inner House of the Court of Session in May 2025

== Chancellor of Robert Gordon University ==
Wood spent 16 years as Chancellor of Robert Gordon University, stepping down in 2021. In 2010, Donald Trump was awarded an honorary degree from the university. This provoked considerable opposition and the degree was removed after Dr David Kennedy returned his own degree in protest and journalist/campaigner Suzanne Kelly's petition opposing the award was signed by approximately 80,000 people, who felt Trump's behaviour was contrary to RGU's values.

== Corporate tax arrangements ==
In 2011, Wood Group transferred North Sea staff to a company in a tax haven apparently to avoid employer national insurance contributions, a move criticised by Scottish politicians. Wood retired from Wood Group the following year.

== Personal life and death ==
Wood had three sons with his wife Helen, and six grandchildren. They had homes in Aberdeen and at Loch Tummel, Perthshire. He died in Aberdeen on 26 July 2026, aged 84.

== Arms, honours and awards ==
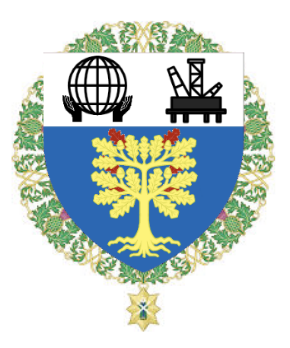
Arms of Sir Ian Wood

- 1982: Commander of the Order of the British Empire (CBE) in the 1982 New Year Honours
- 1984: Honorary Doctor of Laws (LLD) degree from the University of Aberdeen
- 1994: Knight Bachelor in the 1994 New Year Honours
- 1998: Honorary Doctor of Business Administration (DBA) degree from Robert Gordon University
- 2002: Honorary Doctor of Technology (DTech) degree from Glasgow Caledonian University
- 2012: Honorary Doctor of Engineering (DEng) degree from Heriot-Watt University
- 2016: Knight Grand Cross of the Order of the British Empire (GBE) in the 2016 Birthday Honours
- 2018: Knight of the Order of the Thistle (KT) in the 2018 Birthday Honours
