= The Tay Bridge Disaster =

Poem by William McGonagall

- by William McGonagall
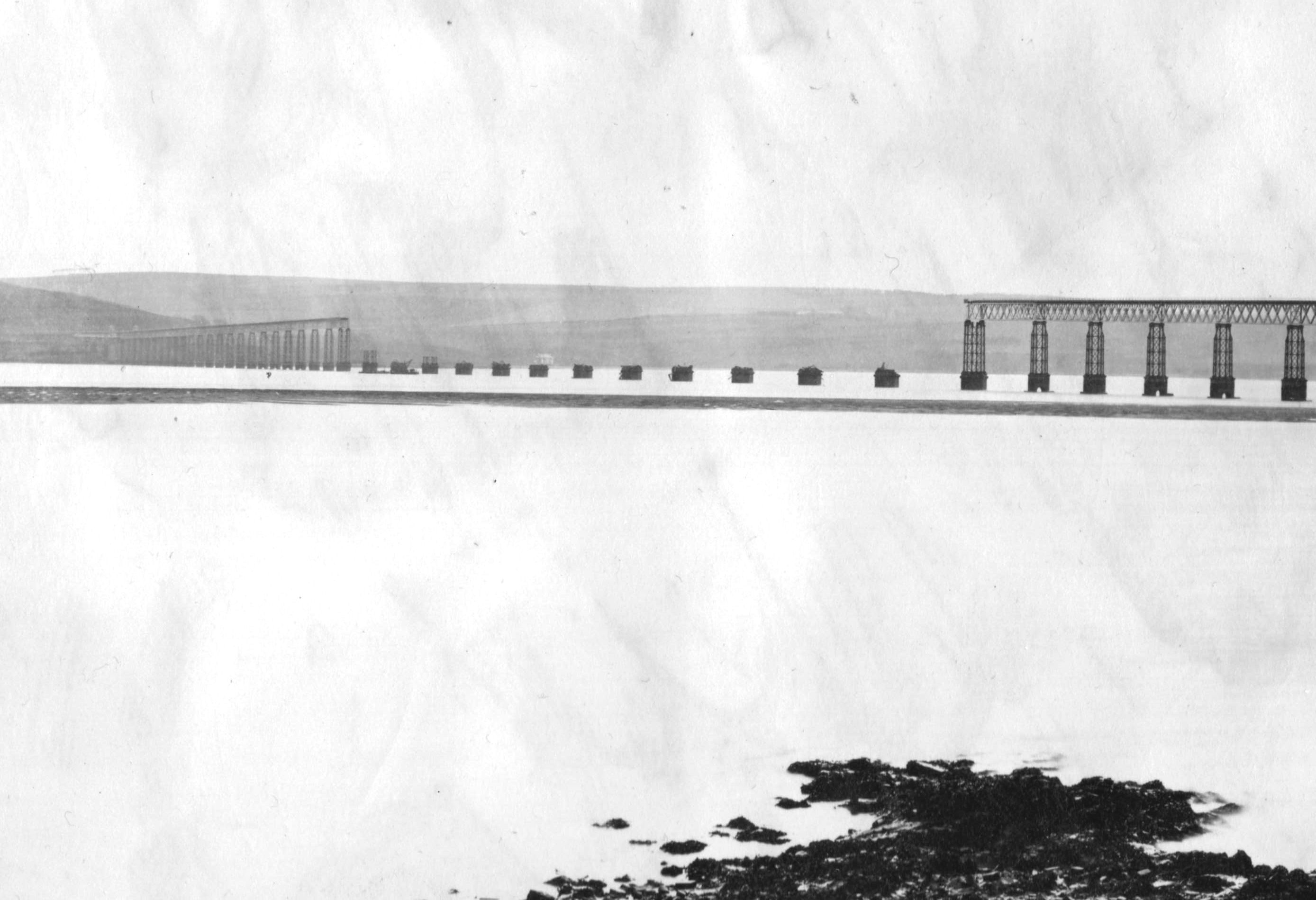
- Original Tay Bridge (from the South) the day after the disaster
- Written: 1880
- Country: United Kingdom
- Language: English
- Subject: Bridge collapse
- Genre: Lament
- Publication date: 1880
- Lines: 61

Full text
- The Tay Bridge Disaster at Wikisource

"The Tay Bridge Disaster" is a poem written in 1880 by the Scottish poet William McGonagall, who has been derided as the worst poet in history. The poem recounts the events of the evening of 28 December 1879, when, during a severe gale, the Tay Rail Bridge at Dundee collapsed as a train was passing over it, with the loss of all on board. The number of deaths was actually 75, not 90 as stated in the poem. (Note: It has been suggested that there were no unknown victims and that the higher figure (of 75, as opposed to 59) arises from double-counting in an early newspaper report. A more mundane explanation would be confusion between the issuing station (given for passengers who had surrendered their tickets) and destination (for those who had not). In any case the inquiry did not take its casualty figures from the Dundee Courier – it took sworn evidence and did its own sums.) The foundations of the bridge were not removed and are alongside the newer bridge.

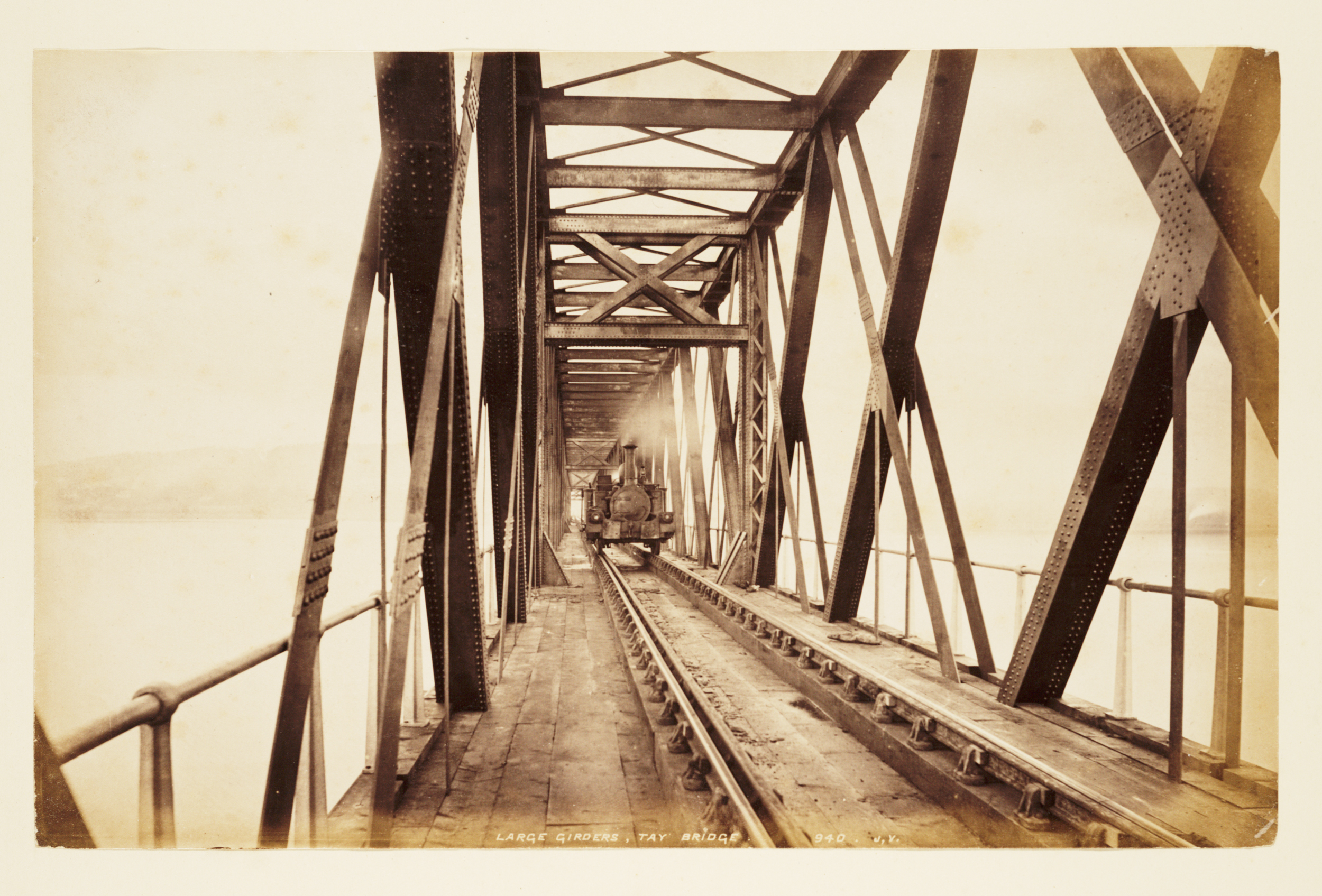
Photograph of section of the first Tay Bridge before its collapse, with a steam train

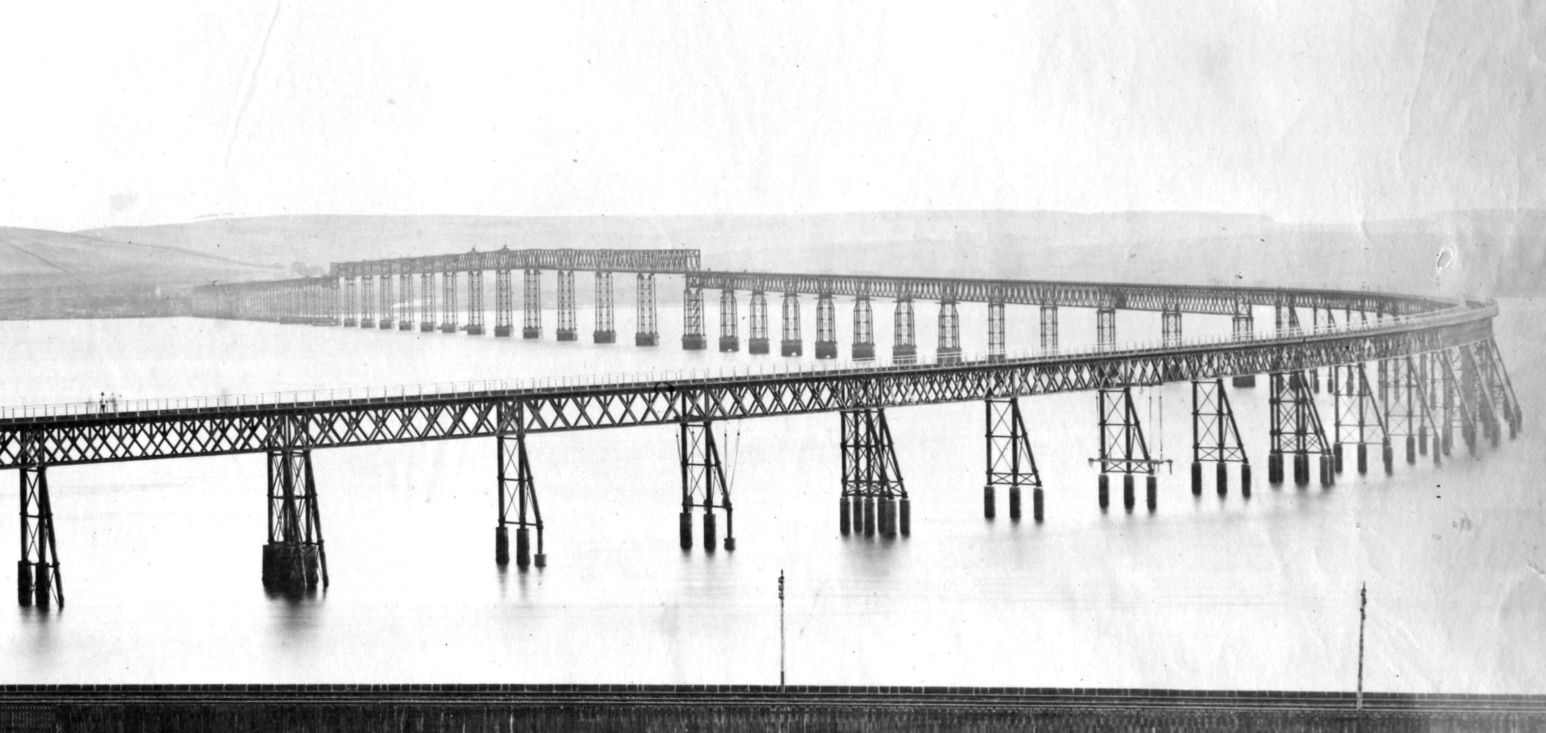
Original Tay Bridge (from the north)

== The poem ==
The poem is among McGonagall's most well-known works, and has been lampooned by critics as one of the worst poems in the English language. It begins:

"Beautiful Railway Bridge of the Silv'ry Tay!
Alas! I am very sorry to say
That ninety lives have been taken away
On the last sabbath day of 1879
Which will be remember'd for a very long time."

And it ends:

"Oh! Ill-fated bridge of the silv'ry Tay,
I now must conclude my lay
By telling the world fearlessly without the least dismay,
That your central girders would not have given way,
At least many sensible men do say,
Had they been supported on each side with buttresses
At least many sensible men confesses,
For the stronger we our houses do build,
The less chance we have of being killed."

William McGonagall wrote two other poems about the Tay bridges. The first one, written before the disaster about the first bridge, begins as follows:

The Railway Bridge of the Silvery Tay:

"Beautiful Railway Bridge of the Silvery Tay!
With your numerous arches and pillars in so grand array,
And your central girders, which seem to the eye
To be almost towering to the sky"

And it ends:

"Beautiful Railway Bridge of the Silvery Tay!
I hope that God will protect all passengers
By night and by day,
And that no accident will befall them while crossing
The Bridge of the Silvery Tay,
For that would be most awful to be seen
Nearby Dundee and the Magdalen Green.

Beautiful Railway Bridge of the Silvery Tay!
And prosperity to Messrs Bouche and Grothe,
The famous engineers of the present day,
Who have succeeded in erecting the Railway
Bridge of the Silvery Tay,
Which stands unequalled to be seen
Nearby Dundee and the Magdalen Green."

After the original bridge collapsed, a new one was built, providing the opportunity for another poem, which begins:

An Address to the New Tay Bridge

"BEAUTIFUL new railway bridge of the Silvery Tay,
With your strong brick piers and buttresses in so grand array,
And your thirteen central girders, which seem to my eye
Strong enough all windy storms to defy."

== Criticism ==
This and other examples of McGonagall's work are often held to be risibly bad poetry. Although McGonagall is obsessive about rhyme, he often repeats the same rhyming pairs. The lines are sometimes of inordinate length and lack any form of scansion or metre. Finally, any pathos generated by the rambling narrative is usually dispelled by the inclusion of inappropriate or irrelevant details. On the other hand, Kirstie Blair contends that McGonagall's poems are no better or worse than most of the broadside ballads that were sold on the streets of Scotland in the 19th-century, whose authors have long since sunk into obscurity.

Billy Connolly recited the poem in full during the Dundee stop of his World Tour of Scotland TV show.

== See also ==
- List of United Kingdom disasters by death toll
