= Union Terrace, Aberdeen =

Street in Aberdeen, Scotland, United Kingdom

Coordinates: 57°8′47″N 2°6′8″W

Union Terrace is a single carriageway street in the city centre of Aberdeen. At the south end, it has a junction with Union Street, at Union Bridge and Bridge Street; and at the north end, it has a junction with Rosemount Viaduct, with the Central Library and His Majesty's Theatre on that street.

The street hosts the Aberdeen International Market regularly.

Union Terrace Gardens are in the Denburn Valley, adjacent to Union Terrace. There are currently plans to enhance the gardens, with one to put an art centre which will blend with the landscape, the other to create a civic square levelling the gardens and bringing them up to street level.

There is also a statue of Robert Burns opposite the Caledonian Hotel. A stone statue of Edward VII was installed at the junction of Union Terrace with Union Street. It was removed on 4 March 2021 as part of the redevelopment of Union Terrace Gardens.

== Gallery ==
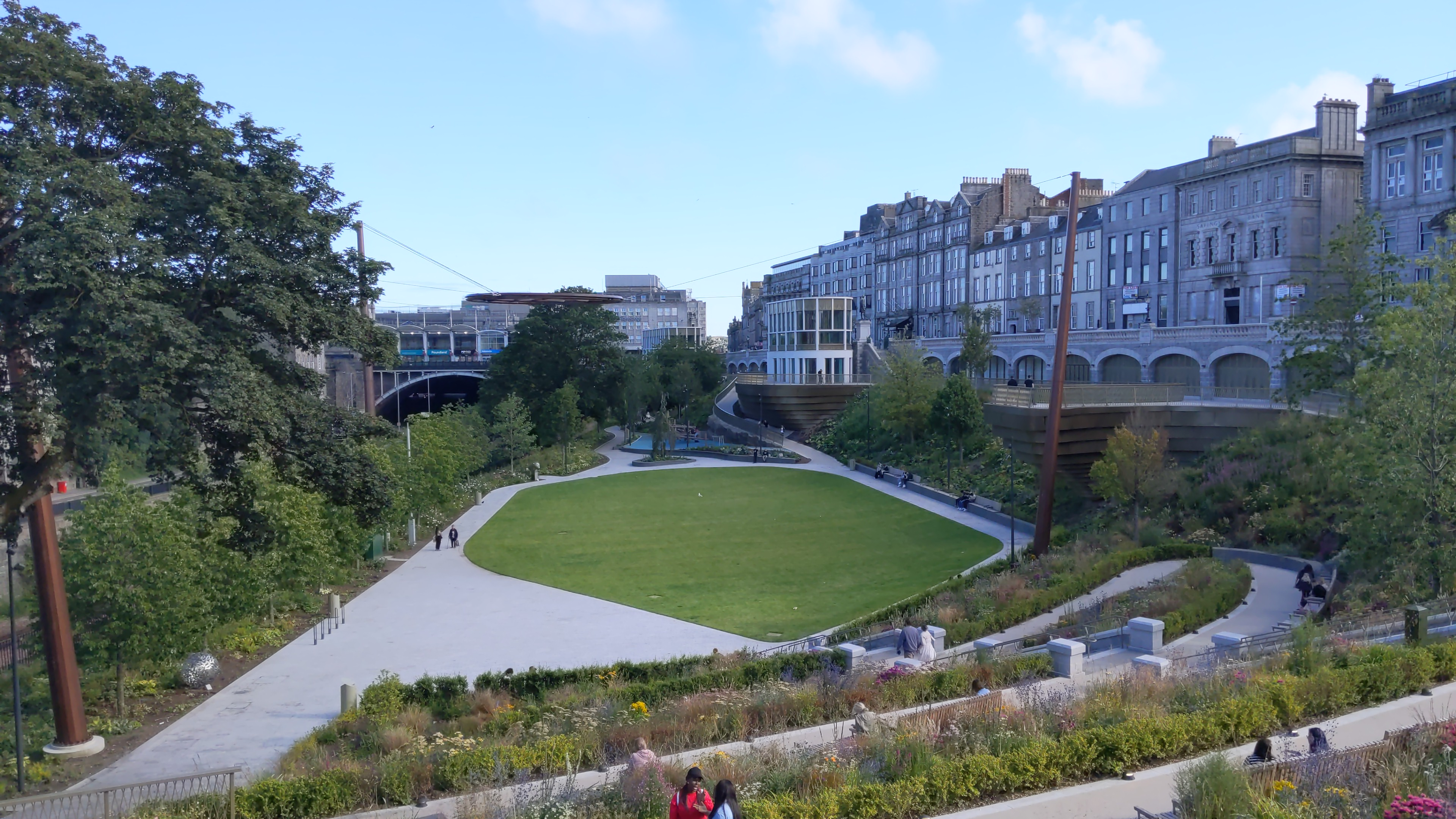
Union Terrace Gardens

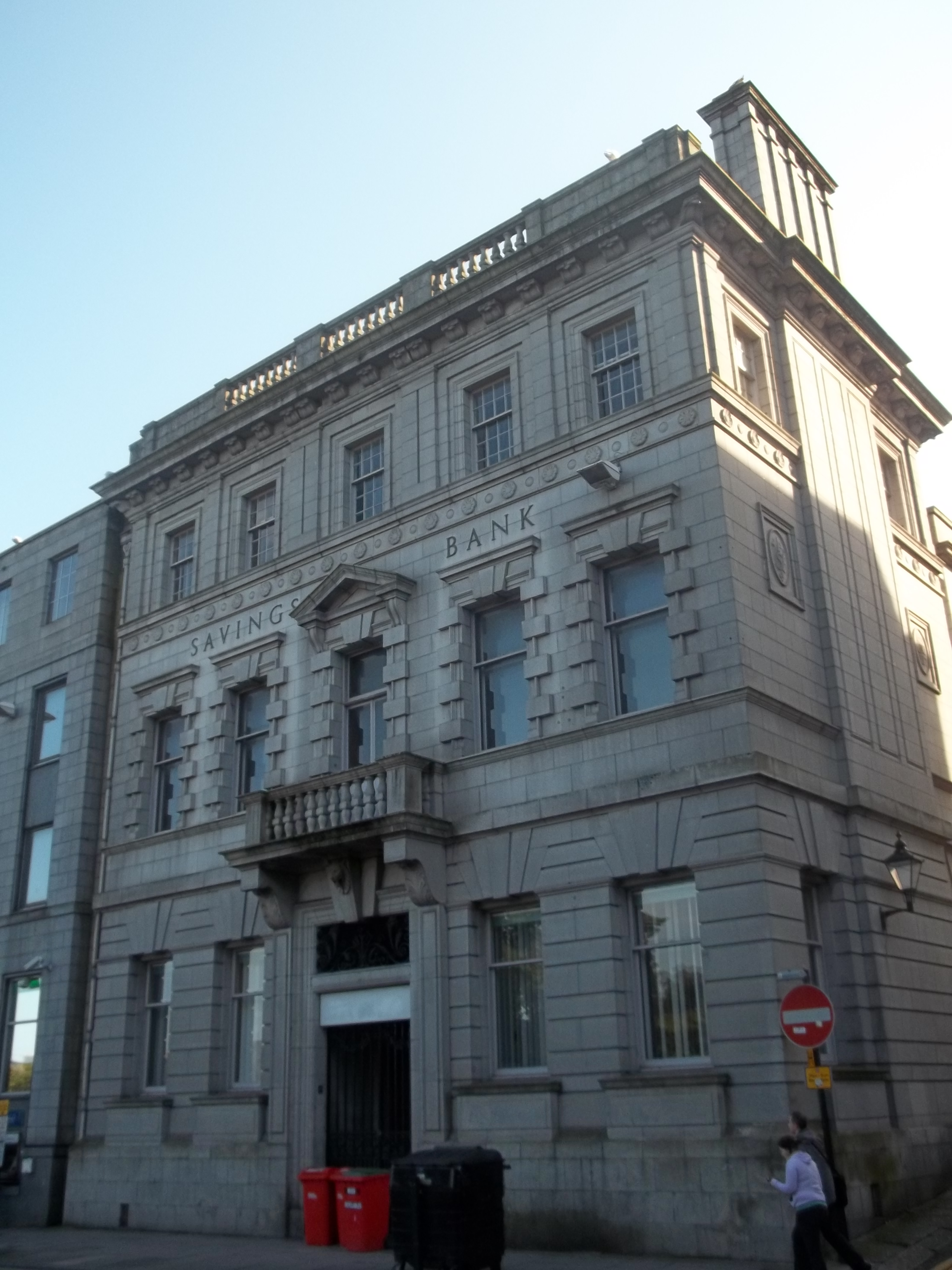
Old Savings Bank, Union Terrace, Aberdeen

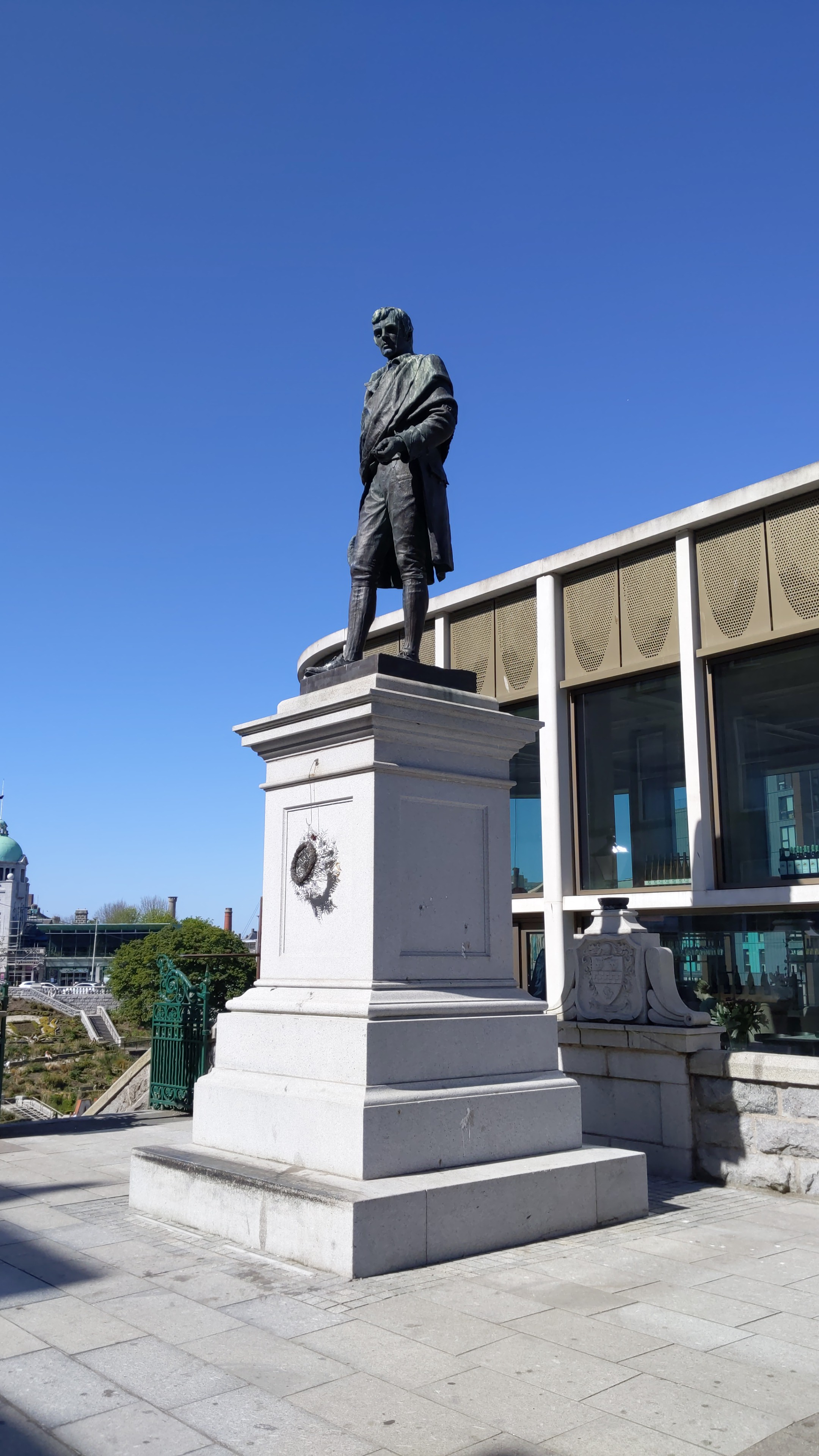
Statue of Robert Burns
