= Union Terrace Gardens =

Public park and gardens in Aberdeen, Scotland

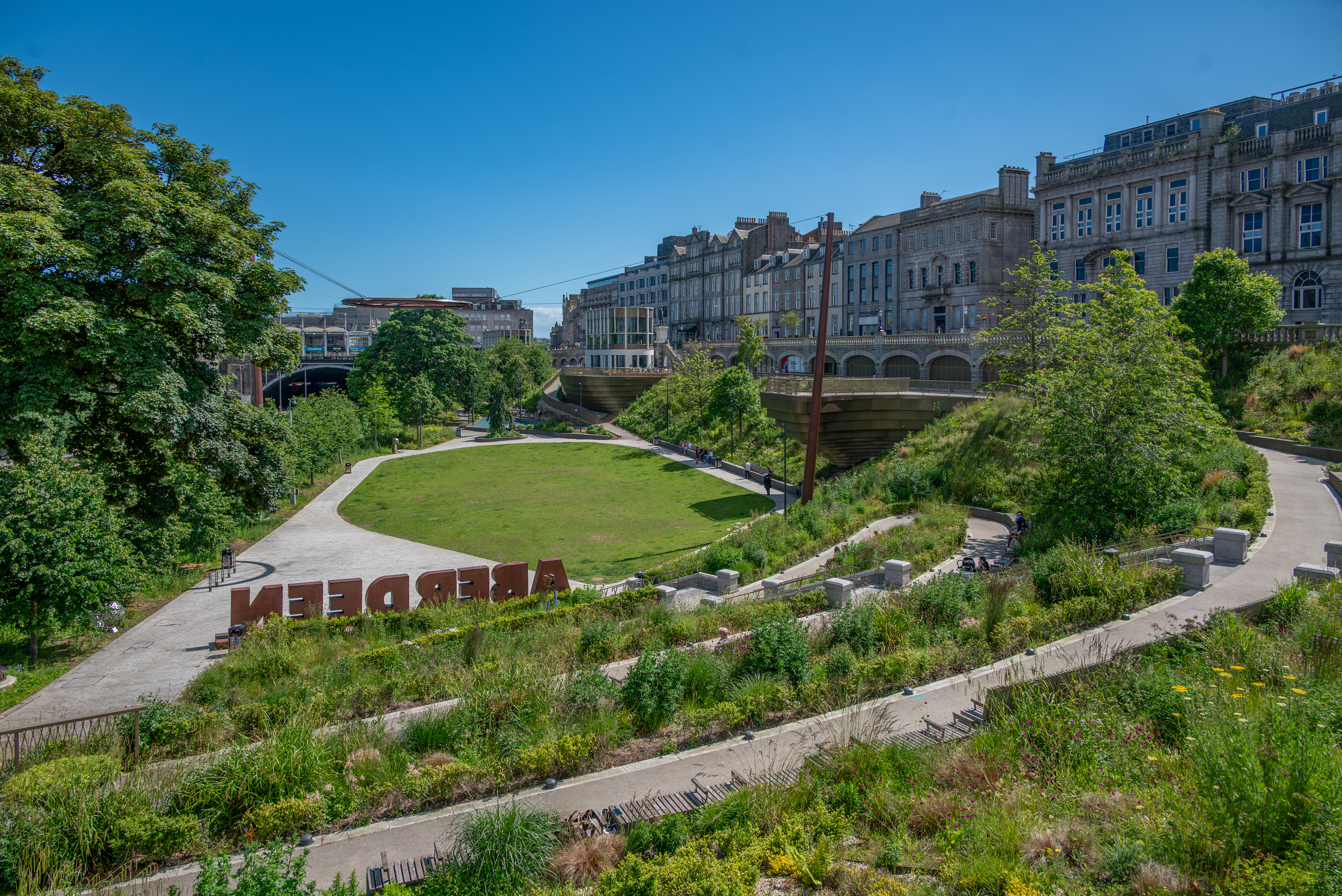
- Interactive map of Union Terrace Gardens
- Type: Public Garden
- Location: Aberdeen, Scotland
- Coordinates: 57°8′49″N 2°6′12″W
- Area: 1 ha (2.5 acres)
- Created: 1879
- Operator: Aberdeen City Council
- Status: Open all year

Union Terrace Gardens is a public park and gardens situated on Union Terrace in Aberdeen, Scotland.

== The gardens ==
The sunken gardens opened to the public in 1879, and cover approximately two and a half acres . The space is bounded to the north by Rosemount Viaduct, to the south by Union Street's main thoroughfare, to the east by the railway and the Den Burn, now flowing underground, and to the west by Union Terrace.Contrary to popular belief the area is not a natural amphitheatre but a small river valley with a late-Victorian viaduct constructed at the North end in 1889. The amphitheatre was formed from the covered remains of Denburn Terrace after demolition.

The park is surrounded by of some of the best architecture of Aberdeen, prominent among which are His Majesty's Theatre, St Mark's Church and the Library on Rosemount Viaduct to the north, and the Triple Kirks to the east.

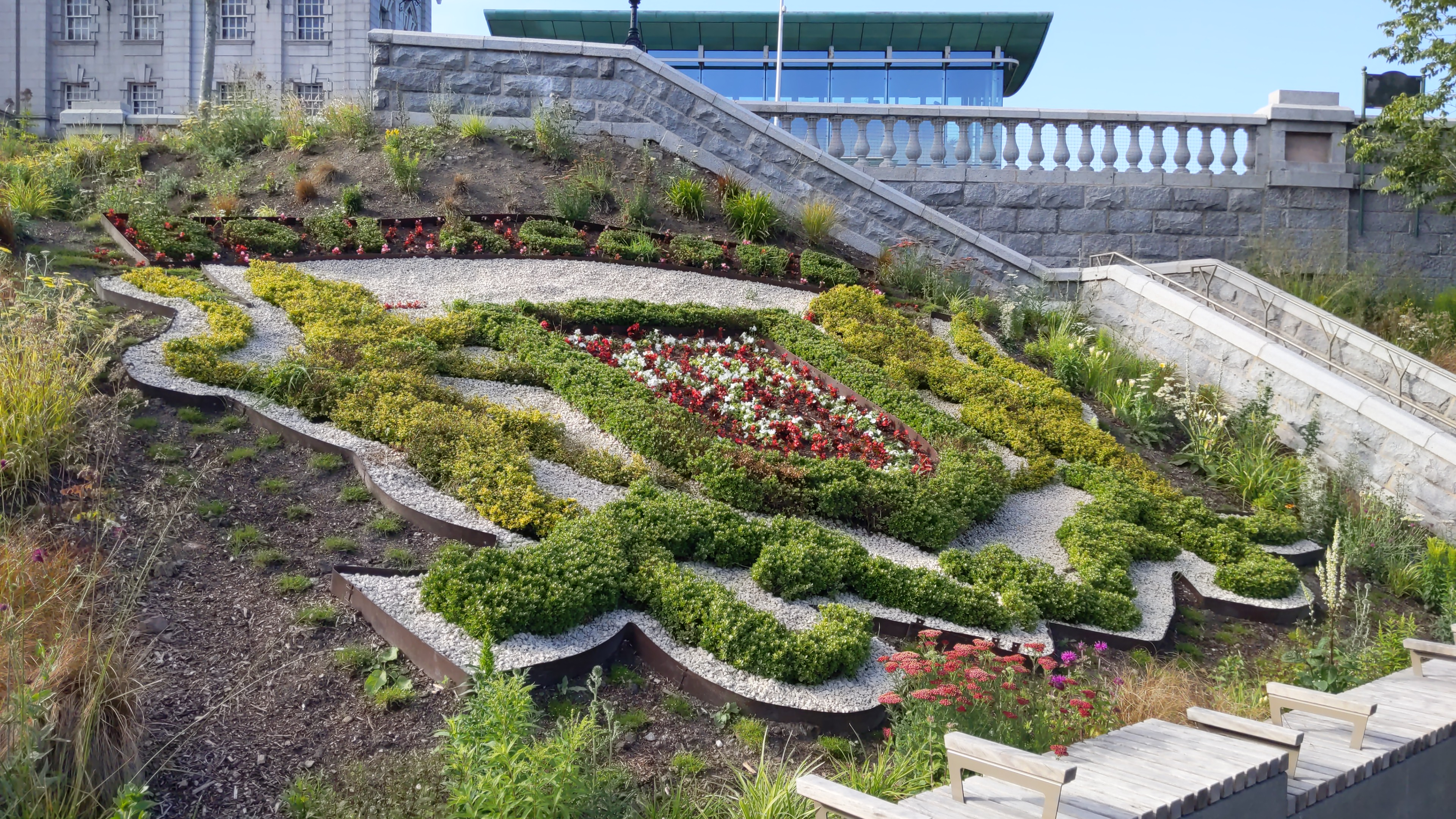
Aberdeen's Floral Crest

On the park's north side is a formally planted and maintained floral crest of the city's coat of arms.

At the Union Street end of the gardens stands a group of mature elm trees, nearly 200 years old. The trees stand on the remnants of the site once known as Corbie Haugh: Corbie in Scots meaning crow, and Haugh meaning a low-lying meadow in a river valley. Corbie Haugh is still an apposite epithet for this area as crows still nest in the elms. The trees were originally planted to stabilise the embankment to prevent the newly widened Union Terrace from slipping into the gardens.

The arches which run along the length of Union Terrace were designed by architect James Matthews, who was instrumental in turning the area into a pleasure park.

== Future Development - The City Garden Project ==
In 2010 controversial plans were unveiled to transform the gardens.

On 19 May, Aberdeen City Council voted in favour of the City Square project to transform the heart of the city into a vibrant, cultural civic space and gardens. At the same time an alternative plan for a contemporary art centre in the gardens, the Peacock proposal, was rejected.

Local oil tycoon Sir Ian Wood pledged up to £85 million of his own money to back the City Square project to "ensure the economic survival of the city centre". The current version of the plan involves raising the level of the Gardens, creating a square which is to be a "cross between a grand Italian piazza and a mini Central Park." A technical appraisal carried out by the architectural firm Halliday Fraser Munro estimated the project would cost around £140 million to build. Andrew Dixon, incoming boss of Scotland's new arts and culture body, Creative Scotland, recently praised the project as a "real opportunity for the city". As part of the project councillors stipulated that at least £15 million be provided for a new cultural centre run by Peacock.

Peacock Visual Arts had been working in partnership with Aberdeen City Council on an alternative proposal to develop a centre for contemporary arts in Aberdeen. The development, designed by London-based architects Brisac Gonzalez, was designed to be built into the existing slopes in the Gardens underneath the Robert Burns statue. The building, which was budgeted at £13.5 million, would contain a gallery, TV studio, print studio, restaurant and offices for Peacock staff and provide a base for Aberdeen City Council's Arts Development and Arts Education teams as well as potentially extra space for Citymoves dance agency. This project had received full planning permission, secured £9.5 million of public funding from Aberdeen City Council, Scottish Enterprise, and the Scottish Arts Council and was scheduled to break ground in late November 2009 before being rejected by Aberdeen city councillors.

The result of a public consultation carried out by ACSEF showed that 55% of those consulted were against the City Square proposals with 44% in favour. Nonetheless, ACSEF (Aberdeen City and Shire Economic Futures), decided to press ahead .with the project and asked the City Council for endorsement to proceed to a further stage, an international design competition. The City Square project has proved highly controversial amongst not only the citizens of Aberdeen, but many expatriate Aberdonians and others from further afield. Opponents of the project formed a campaign group known as Friends of Union Terrace Gardens. The campaign group held a mass picnic in the gardens on 12 June 2010 which attracted over a thousand people and generated nearly 400 letters to councillors opposing the plans. On 2 March 2011, after a referendum in which 86,000 people voted, it was announced that 52% had voted for the City Garden Project.

== Rejection of the City Garden Project ==
On 22 August 2012, Aberdeen City Council finally rejected the City Garden Project by two votes. The councillors supported an alternative proposal from the Independent Alliance Group, to regenerate Union Street, the Arts Centre, the Music Hall, the Lemon Tree and the Mither Kirk.

== Future Developments - post-City Gardens Project ==
Following the 2012 rejection of the City Garden Project, Sir Ian Wood stated on 21 August 2013 that he would still be willing to give £50m to replacement plans though he indicated such plans would need to be in place by the end of 2013. In December 2013, Aberdeen City Council rejected Sir Ian Wood's offer of £50 million which was subsequently withdrawn in January 2014.

On 29 August 2013, new drawings for a potential redevelopment were unveiled and published in both national and local press. The drawings by city architect John Halliday showed the gardens being partly raised whilst leaving some areas sunken. The designs included the covering of the Denburn dual-carriageway and railway tracks to form a link to Belmont Street, the creation of a new arts centre and a new entrance to Aberdeen Rail Station. Further developments of the Halliday plans were released on 27 January 2014 centred on the addition of a canopy along a portion of Union Street running from Bridge Street to Market Street, a portion of which would be over part of the Civic Square as proposed in the August plans.

== 2019-2022 Redevelopment ==
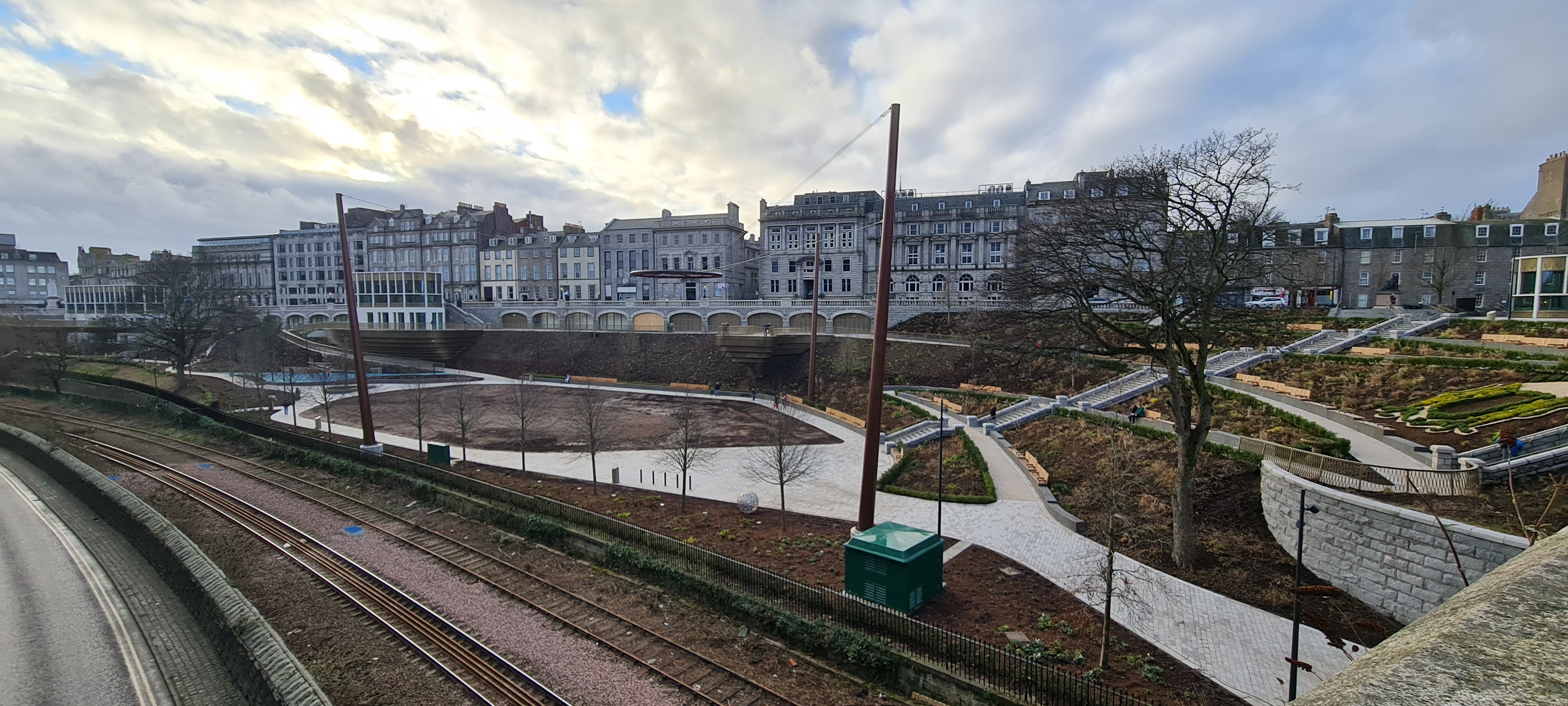
UTG the day before it re-opened in December 2022

In 2019, Union Terrace Gardens was closed for redevelopment and re-opened on 22 December 2022. The £28.3 million scheme was designed by Stallan-Brand Architecture + Design and LDA Design, with works delivered by Balfour Beatty, and included new accessible pathways, terracing, and landscaping, alongside the restoration of Victorian arches and historic features. The redesign sought to improve accessibility, provide new event spaces, and integrate planting and lighting to encourage year-round use of the gardens.

== See also ==
- Green spaces and walkways in Aberdeen
