= List of places in Aberdeen =

List of settlements in the Aberdeen area

See the list of places in Scotland for places in other counties.

This List of places in Aberdeen is a list of links for any town, village and hamlet in the Aberdeen City council area of Scotland.

== A ==
- Aberdeen Art Gallery
- Aberdeen Arts Centre
- Aberdeen Beach and Queens Links
- Aberdeen Castle
- Aberdeen Exhibition and Conference Centre
- Aberdeen International Airport
- Aberdeen Maritime Museum
- Aberdeen railway station
- Altens
- Ashgrove
- Auchmill Golf Club

== B ==
- Balnagask Golf Club
- Beach Ballroom
- Berryden
- Bieldside
- Braeside
- Bridge of Dee
- Bridge of Don
- Brig o' Balgownie
- Broomhill
- Bucksburn

== C ==
- Cornhill
- Countesswells
- Cove Bay
- Craibstone Golf Centre
- Craigiebuckler
- Cults
- Cummings Park
- Cruickshank Botanic Gardens

== D ==
- Danestone
- Deeside Golf Club
- Deeside Way
- Doonies Farm
- Duthie Park and Winter Gardens
- Dyce, Dyce railway station

== F ==
- Ferryhill
- Footdee
- Foresterhill
- Formartine and Buchan Way
- Froghall

== G ==
- Garthdee
- Gordon Highlanders Museum
- Gray's School of Art

== H ==
- Hanover
- Hazlehead, Hazlehead Golf Club, Hazlehead Park
- Heathryfold
- Hilton
- His Majesty's Theatre

== J ==
- Johnston Gardens

== K ==
- Kaimhill
- Kincorth
- King's College
- King's College Chapel
- King's Links Golf Club
- Kingswells
- Kirk of St Nicholas
- Kittybrewster

== L ==
- Leggart

== M ==
- Mannofield
- Marischal College
- Mastrick
- Middlefield
- Midstocket
- Milltimber
- Murcar Links Golf Club
- Music Hall

== N ==
- Nigg
- Northfield

== O ==
- Old Aberdeen

== P ==
- Peterculter, Peterculter Golf Club
- Pittodrie Stadium
- Powis
- Provost Ross's House
- Provost Skene's House

== Q ==
- Queen's Cross

== R ==
- River Dee
- River Don
- Robert Gordon's College
- Robert Gordon University
- Rosehill
- Rosemount
- Royal Aberdeen Golf Club
- Rubislaw, Rubislaw and Queen's Terrace Gardens
- Ruthrieston

== S ==
- Scotstown Moor
- Seafield
- Seaton, Seaton Park
- Sheddocksley
- St Andrew's Cathedral
- St Machar's Cathedral
- St Mary's Cathedral
- Stewart Park
- Stockethill
- Stoneywood
- Summerhill
- Sunnybank

== T ==
- Tillydrone
- Torry
- Tullos

== U ==
- Union Terrace Gardens
- University of Aberdeen

== V ==
- Victoria Park

== W ==
- Westburn Park
- William Wallace Statue
- Woodside

== See also ==
- List of places in Scotland
- List of places in Aberdeenshire
