= List of public art in Aberdeen =

This is a list of public art in Aberdeen, Scotland. This list applies only to works of public art on permanent display in an outdoor public space and does not, for example, include artworks in museums.

== Aberdeen Harbour ==
Image	Title / subject	Location and coordinates	Date	Artist / designer	Type	Material	Dimensions	Designation	Wikidata	Notes
	War memorial	Pocra Quay, Footdee, Aberdeen Harbour	1919	Alexander Watson, James Garden Milne (designers)	Obelisk on pedestal	Stone				
	Sea Moon	Seafront, Aberdeen Bay	1986	Janusz Tkaczuk	Abstract sculpture	Metal and stone				

== Balgownie ==
Image	Title / subject	Location and coordinates	Date	Artist / designer	Type	Material	Dimensions	Designation	Wikidata	Notes
	War memorial	Oldmacher Church, Brig o' Balgownie	1920	William Boddie (builder)	Pillar	Granite				

== City centre ==
Image	Title / subject	Location and coordinates	Date	Artist / designer	Type	Material	Dimensions	Designation	Wikidata	Notes
More images	Mercat cross	Castlegate	1686	John Montgomery of Old Rayne	Statue on shaft and arched structure	Sandstone		Category A	Q17576440	
	The Mannie	Castle Street	c. 1708		Statue and well housing	Lead and stone				
More images	George Gordon, 5th Duke of Gordon	Golden Square	1842	Thomas Campbell with Macdonald Field & Co.	Statue on pedestal	Granite		Category B	Q17770129	
More images	Gordon of Khartoum	In front of Robert Gordon's College, Schoolhill	1884	Thomas Stuart Burnett	Statue on pedestal	Bronze and granite	5m high	Category B	Q17770171	
More images	Queen Victoria	Queen's Cross	1893	Charles Bell Birch	Statue on pedestal	Bronze and granite		Category B	Q17770185	
More images	Lord Byron	Aberdeen Grammar School	c. 1913	Alexander J. Leslie after James Pittendrigh Macgillivray	Statue on pedestal	Bronze and granite		Category B	Q17770109	
More images	Lion sculpture war memorial	Exterior of Cowdray Hall, Blackfrairs Street	1925	William McMillan	Sculpture on pedestal	Granite		Category A	Q4666883	
	Sea Fantasy	Grounds of Provost Skene's House	1946	T. B. Huxley-Jones	Statue group	Bronze				
More images	Robert The Bruce	Marischal College, Broad Street	2011	Alan Beattie Herriot	Equestrian statue on pedestal	Bronze and stone				
	Poised	Marischal Square, Broad Street	2017	Andy Scott	Statue on pillar	Steel	15m high			

=== Union Terrace ===
Image	Title / subject	Location and coordinates	Date	Artist / designer	Type	Material	Dimensions	Designation	Wikidata	Notes
	Albert, Prince Consort	Union Terrace	Unveiled 1863	Carlo Marochetti	Seated statue on pedestal	Bronze and granite	2.1m tall (statue)	Category B	Q17770085	
More images	Statue of William Wallace	Union Terrace	1888	William Grant Stevenson	Statue on pedestal	Bronze and granite		Category B	Q8019940	
More images	Robert Burns	Union Terrace	1892	Henry Bain Smith	Statue on pedestal	Bronze and granite		Category B	Q17770098	
More images	Edward VII	Union Terrace	1914	Alfred Drury & A.G.R. Mackenzie (pedestal)	Statue on pedestal with figure groups	Granite		Category B	Q17770122	

== Duthie Park ==
Image	Title / subject	Location and coordinates	Date	Artist / designer	Type	Material	Dimensions	Designation	Wikidata	Notes
More images	Monument to Sir James McGrigor	Duthie Park	1860	Alexander Ellis (architect), James Giles (artist)	Obelisk	Granite		Category C	Q56624785	
More images	Gordon Highlanders memorial cross	Duthie Park	1882		Celtic cross	Granite	4.5m	Category C	Q77776608	
More images	Monument to Elizabeth Crombie Duthie	Duthie Park	1883	Arthur Taylor (sculptor), John Cassidy of Manchester (designer)	Statue of Hygeia on piller with lion sculptures at base	Stone		Category B	Q17770643	
More images	Gordon Highlanders memorial obelisk	Duthie Park	1898	F.W. Pomeroy (sculptor), Douglas Strachan (designer), Henderson & Webster (masons)	Obelisk	Granite	4.5m high	Category C	Q77776613	
More images	Alexander Taylor memorial fountain	Duthie Park	Late 19th century		Fountain	Stone		Category C	Q77776617	

== Dyce ==
Image	Title / subject	Location and coordinates	Date	Artist / designer	Type	Material	Dimensions	Designation	Wikidata	Notes
	War memorial	Gordon Terrace, Dyce	1921	Dr. William Kelly (designer)	Cenotaph	Granite	4.5m high	Category C	Q56614453	

== Hazlehead Park ==
Image	Title / subject	Location and coordinates	Date	Artist / designer	Type	Material	Dimensions	Designation	Wikidata	Notes
	Alexander Cooper fountain	Hazlehead Park	1901	Arthur Taylor (manufacturer)	Fountain	Granite and copper				
More images	Piper Alpha memorial	Hazlehead Park	1991	Sue Jane Taylor	Statue group on pedestal	Bronze and granite				

== Nigg ==
Image	Title / subject	Location and coordinates	Date	Artist / designer	Type	Material	Dimensions	Designation	Wikidata	Notes
	War memorial	Grounds of Parish Church, Nigg		Gibb Bros. (masons)	Obelisk on pedestal	Granite	4.5m high			

== Old Aberdeen ==
Image	Title / subject	Location and coordinates	Date	Artist / designer	Type	Material	Dimensions	Designation	Wikidata	Notes
More images	Mercat cross	High Street, Old Aberdeen	Late 15th century		Shaft on steps	Stone		Category B	Q17770068	
More images	Youth with a split apple	King's College, Aberdeen	2005	Kenny Hunter	Statue on plinth	Bronze				

== Peterculter ==
Image	Title / subject	Location and coordinates	Date	Artist / designer	Type	Material	Dimensions	Designation	Wikidata	Notes
	War memorial	Peterculter	1920	R.W. Walker (architect)	Tower	Granite				
More images	Boys Brigade memorial	Peterculter	2009		Monolith	Granite				
