= Stewart Park =

Stewart Park may refer to:

- Stewart Park, Aberdeen, Scotland
- Stewart Park, Middlesbrough, England
- Stewart Park (Ithaca, New York), United States
