= Wallace Statue =

Wallace Statue may refer to the following monuments in Scotland:

- Wallace Monument, Stirling, which has at its corner a statue of Wallace
- Statue of William Wallace, Aberdeen
- Statue of William Wallace, Bemersyde

== See also ==
- William Wallace
- National Monument of Scotland, Edinburgh
- Wallace's Monument, Ayrshire
- William Wallace Monument at Elderslie
