= Middlefield =

Middlefield may refer to:

== Canada ==
- Middlefield, Nova Scotia
- Middlefield Collegiate Institute, a high school in the area
- Middlefield Road, a street in Toronto
- a community in Markham, Ontario

== England ==
- Middlefield, Stapleford, a mansion in Stapleford, Cambridgeshire

== Scotland ==
- Middlefield, Aberdeen, a place in Aberdeen
- Middlefield, Falkirk, a U.K. location

== United States ==
- Middlefield, Connecticut
- Middlefield, Massachusetts
- Middlefield, New York
- Middlefield, Ohio
- Middlefield station, a light rail station in Mountain View, California
- Middlefield Township, Buchanan County, Iowa
- Middlefield Township, Geauga County, Ohio
