= First Aberdeen bus route 15 =

Bus route in Aberdeen, Scotland

15

Overview
- Operator: First Aberdeen
- Status: Operating

Route
- Start: Countesswells
- Via: Guild Street
- End: Balnagask

Route 15 is a bus route in Aberdeen operated by First Aberdeen. It operates every 40 minutes throughout the day.

== History ==
Route number 15 was formerly allocated to a route via Union Street between the beach and either Craigiebuckler or Airyhall. In July 2022, this route was withdrawn as part of a wider timetable change that saw a new route 15 introduced between Countesswells and Balnagask. The changes were met with criticism as it left Footdee without a bus service.

The new route to Countssells was also criticised as local residents claimed that Countesswells Road is too narrow for buses to pass other vehicles safely. First conducted a site visit in July 2022 and stated they deemed the road to be suitable.

Route 15 no longer serves Countesswells which is now served by an extension to route 11. The number 11 bus previously terminated at Woodend.
