= Countesswells =

Area of Aberdeen, Scotland

Coordinates: 57.136675°N 2.2125404°W

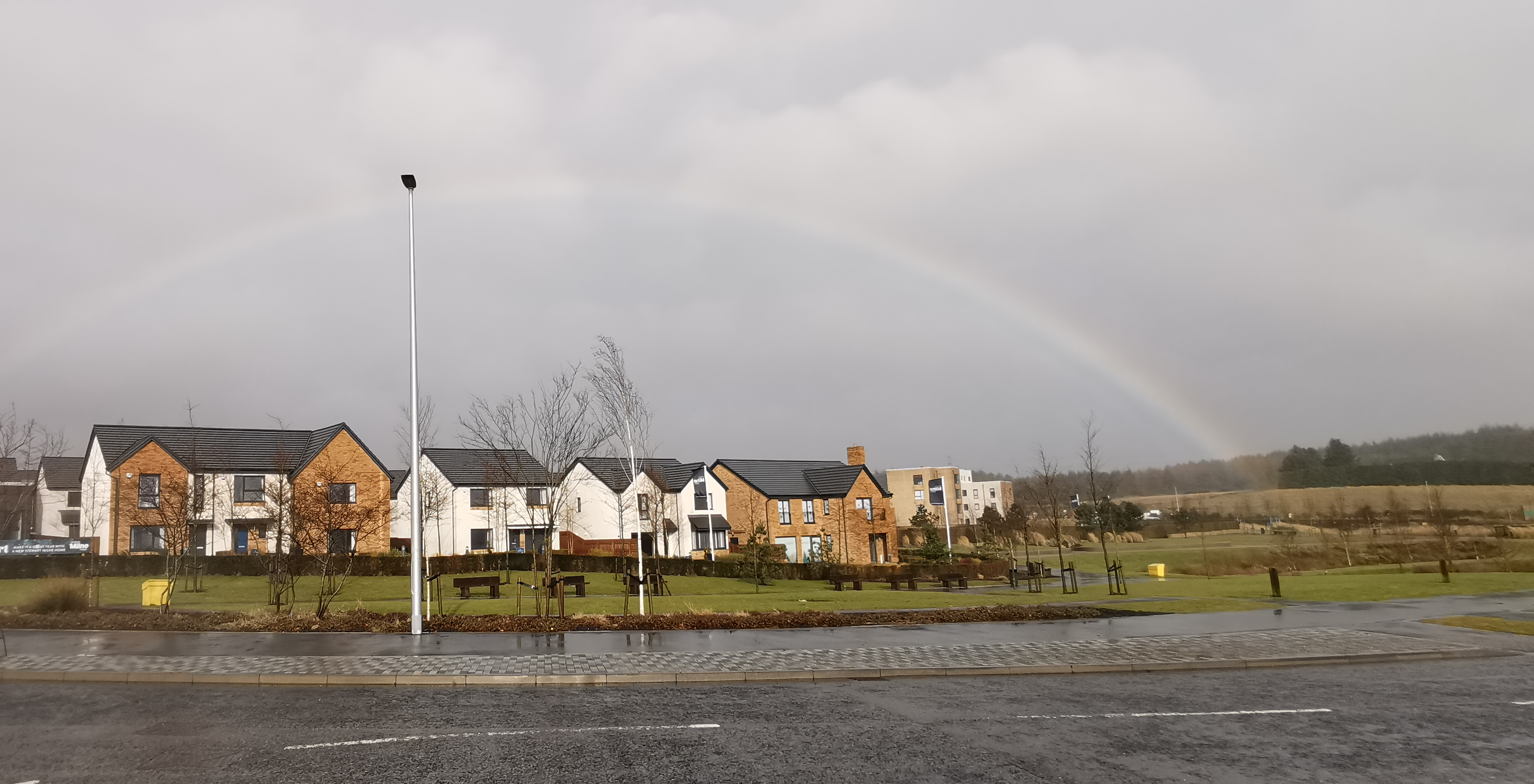
- Cultsburn Park in Countesswells

- Location within Aberdeen City council area Location within Scotland
- OS grid reference: NJ872051
- Council area: Aberdeen City
- Lieutenancy area: Aberdeen
- Country: Scotland
- Sovereign state: United Kingdom
- Post town: ABERDEEN
- Postcode district: AB15
- Dialling code: 01224
- Police: Scotland
- Fire: Scottish
- Ambulance: Scottish
- UK Parliament: Aberdeen South
- Scottish Parliament: Aberdeen South and North Kincardine (Scottish Parliament constituency)
- Website: aberdeencity.gov.uk

Countesswells is an area of Aberdeen, Scotland.

== Construction ==
In 2014, planning permission was granted for 3,000 homes in the area. However, the development was initially delayed after the developers and land owners could not agree on the funding for schools and infrastructure. In April 2016, Stewart Milne Group stated that it expected to start work on the development immediately. By November 2021, 900 homes were either completed or under construction.

== Facilities ==
There is a Sainsbury's and a primary school, along with a number of vacant shop units - the NHS has been granted planning permission for one of these. A pharmacy has applied for a licence for one of the units which was rejected by the local NHS board after pharmacies in Cults and Kingswells said it would lose them business - this is awaiting appeal as of August 2023. There are a number of empty commercial units both beside the school and towards where the planned town-centre will eventually be.

=== Cults Burn Park ===
Cults Burn Park is currently partially constructed and will eventually run through most of the development.

=== Forest Access ===
There are three wooded areas around Countesswells. To the West is Countesswells Forest, which was heavily damaged in a major winter storm. To the South is Foggieton. To the East is the wooded area at the back of Hazlehead Park.

== Transportation ==
There are two bus routes to Countesswells; one via First Aberdeen, the other via Stagecoach using route number 4. In July 2022, service 15 was introduced by First Aberdeen. It runs from Countesswells to Balnagask via Aberdeen city centre.
