= Green spaces and walkways in Aberdeen =

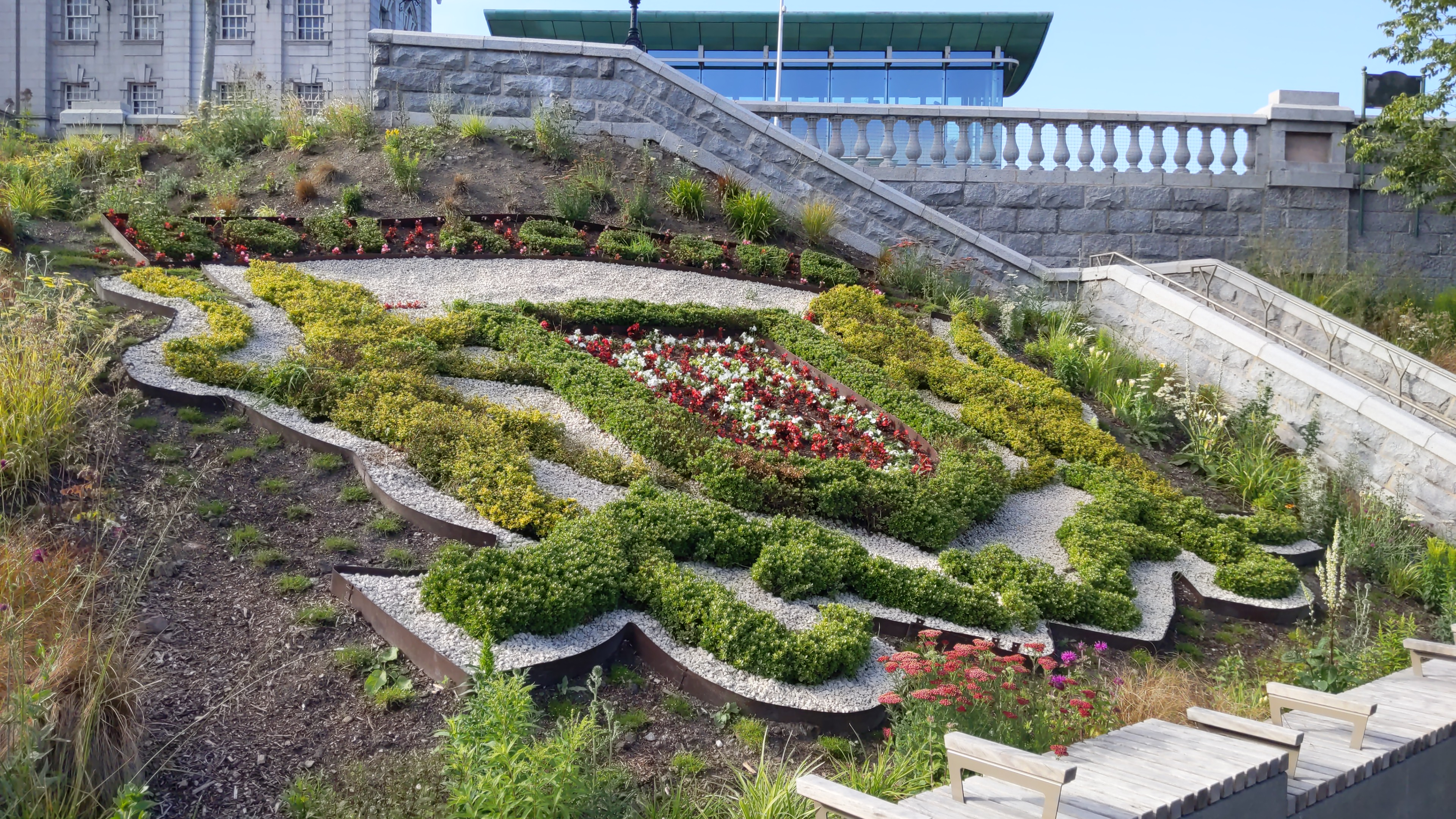
The City's Coat of Arms in Union Terrace Gardens

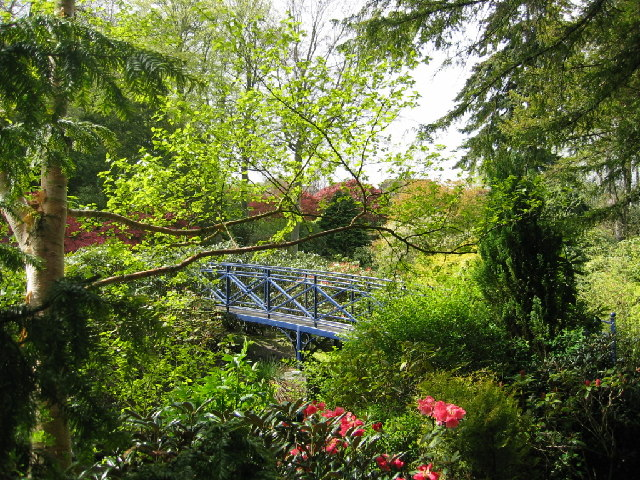
Johnston Gardens

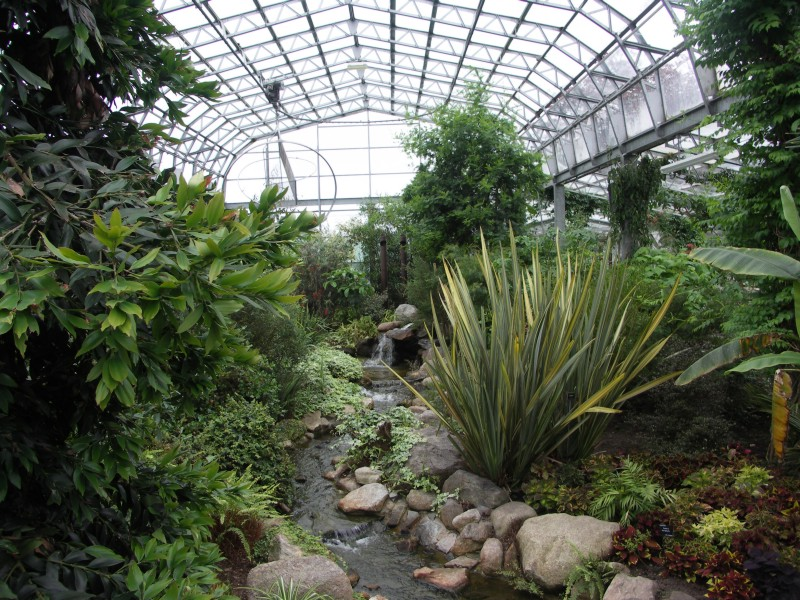
Duthie Park Winter Gardens

The Scottish city of Aberdeen has a number of green spaces and walkways. The parks, gardens and floral displays which include 2 million roses, 11 million daffodils and 3 million crocuses have led the city to win the Royal Horticultural Society's Britain in Bloom Best City award many times, including a period of nine years straight. It won the 2006 Scotland in Bloom Best City award along with the International Cities in Bloom award. The suburb of Dyce also won the Small Towns award.

== City parks ==
Aberdeen City Council's website states the city has six "city parks". In rank order these are:

NB, little data is available for the area of Aberdeen Beach and Queens Links - this may affect the rankings.

Park	Size rank	Size	Opened date / by	Coordinates	Named after	Facilities
Hazlehead Park	1	180 hectares / 1,800,000 m^{2}	1920	57°8′19″N 2°10′43″W	Formerly the grounds of Hazlehead House, home of William Rose, shipbuilder	Large area forested, football pitches, two 18-hole golf courses and one 9-hole, horse riding stables
Seaton Park	2	27 hectares / 270,000 m^{2}	1947	57°10′18″N 2°6′9″W	Seaton House, home of the Hays of Seaton	Flowerbeds, football pitches
Duthie Park	3	50 acres / 202,000 m^{2}	1899 / Princess Beatrice	57°7′49″N 2°6′14″W	Elizabeth Crombie Duthie of Ruthrieston	Winter gardens and other ornate gardens.
Victoria Park	4	13 acres / 53,000 m^{2}	1871	57°9′6″N 2°7′21″W	Her Majesty Queen Victoria	Ornamental park
Westburn Park	4	13 acres / 53,000 m^{2}	1901	57°9′13″N 2°7′22″W	The Westburn (watercourse)	Indoor and outdoor tennis, large grass pitches, children's cycle track, bowls lawn
Aberdeen Beach and Queens Links	?	?	?	57°9′11″N 2°4′38″W	?	Beach leisure centre (swimming, wall climbing, ice rink NOW RE-OPENED), 18 hole links golf course, beach

== Local parks ==
Aberdeen City Council's website states the city has seven "local parks". Some of these are

- Allan Park, a small park near Cults.
- Johnston Gardens (1 hectare (10,000 m^{2})) is situated in the Rubislaw area. It hosts many different types of flowers and plants which have been renowned for their beauty which have led the gardens to winning categories in the 'Britain in Bloom' competitions.
- Rubislaw Terrace Gardens a small 1-acre (4,000 m^{2}) park in the centre of Aberdeen, near Queens Cross.
- Stewart Park (5 acres (20,000 m^{2})) opened in 1894 and is situated in the Hilton area. The park was named after a former Lord Provost of the city, Sir David Stewart. There are sections is reserved for cricket and football matches.
- Sunnybank Park, a park owned by Friends of Sunnybank Park since 2011.
- Union Terrace Gardens (1 hectare (10,000 m^{2})) opened in 1879 and is situated in the centre of the city. The gardens are a popular rendezvous in the heart of the city, enjoyed by both locals and visitors. Surrounding the gardens are a number of important ancient protected Elm Trees, and during the summer season at the north end, a formally planted and maintained City Coat of Arms.

St Fitticks Park, Torry. An area of open space with woodland areas and a renaturalised wetland, created in an award winning project in 2012, converting a polluted burn into a beautiful wild space with abundant wildlife. (https://www.aberdeencity.gov.uk/News/Press-Archive/Article?title=Award%20for%20city%20environment%20project)

== Walkways ==
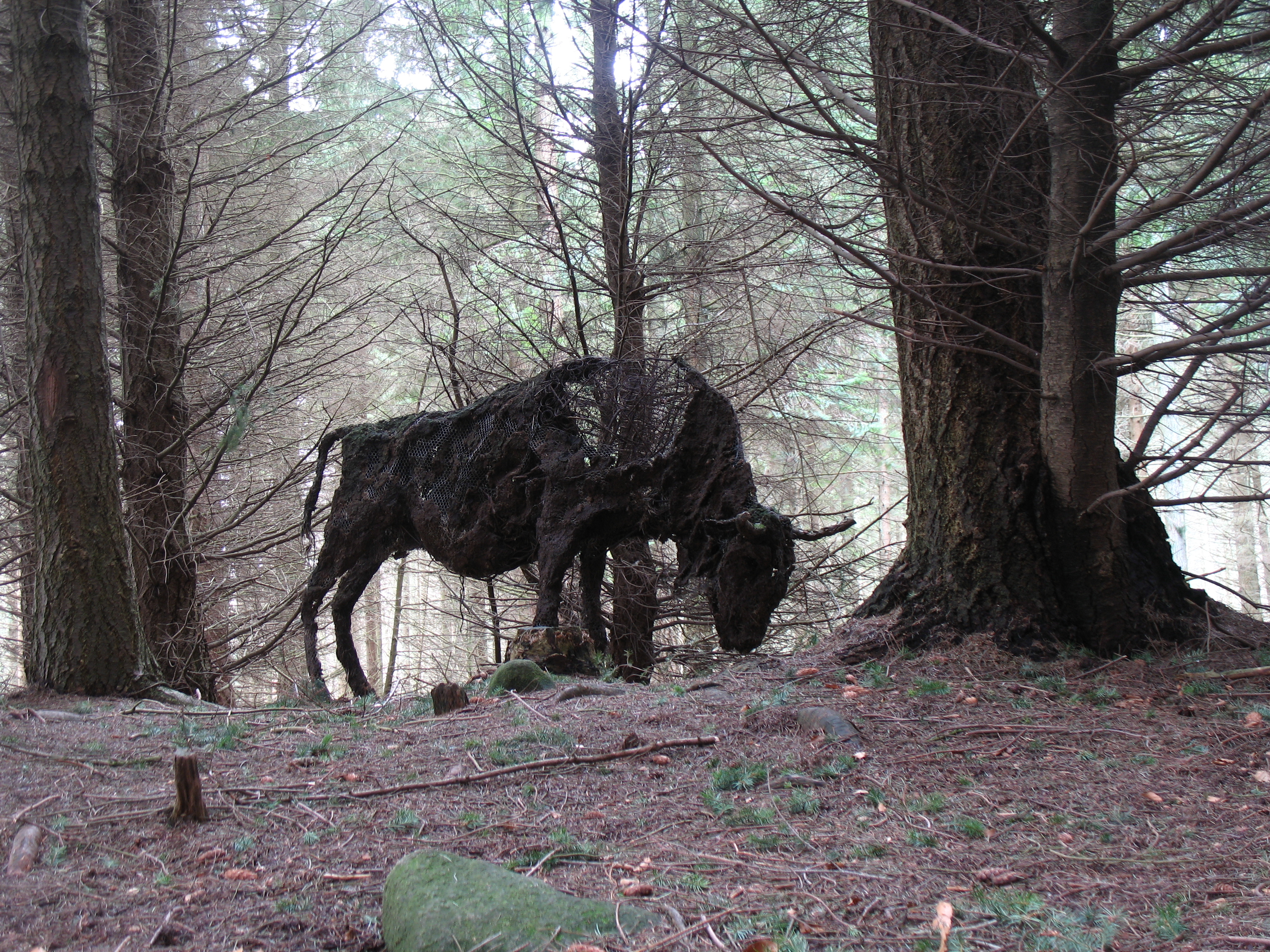
Sculpture of European Bison by Sally Matthews, Tyrebagger sculpture park

The Deeside Way is a popular walkway and track that is used by cyclists and walkers. The trail runs from the Duthie Park to Peterculter along the former Deeside Railway which has had its tracks lifted.

The Formartine and Buchan Way is a walkway along old railway route the Formartine and Buchan Railway which ran from Dyce to Fraserburgh. The current walkway is along the entire old route where the tracks have been lifted much like the Deeside Way. The track runs almost parallel to the National Cycle Network track between Dyce and Auchnagatt, where the tracks cross over.

There are various walks and trails, punctuated by sculptures, through Tyrebagger Woods, west of Aberdeen off the A96 road.
