= Scotstown Moor =

Nature reserve in Aberdeen, Scotland

Coordinates: 57.197°N 2.110°W

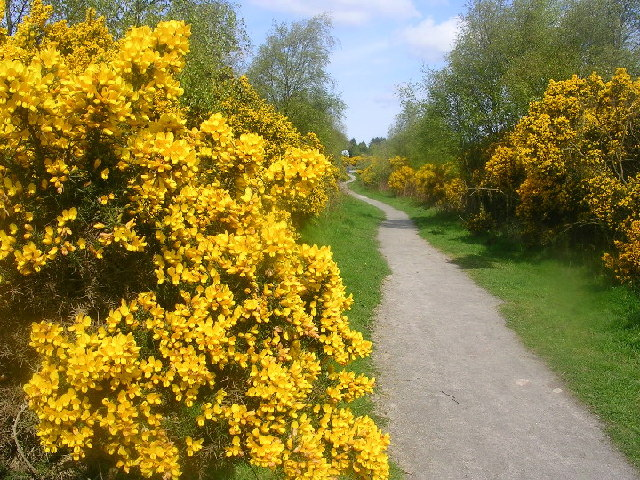
Looking through the gorse bushes that line some of the paths

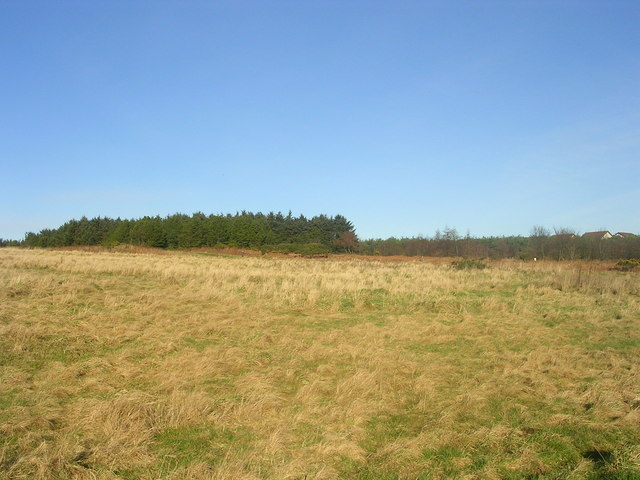
View across the moor

Scotstown Moor is in the north of Aberdeen, Scotland.

Scotstown Moor Local Nature Reserve (LNR) is located four miles to the north of Aberdeen City Centre, near the residential areas of Dubford and Bridge of Don, at grid reference NJ 935116. The reserve covers roughly 34 hectares and is owned by Aberdeen City Council, who established it as a nature reserve in 1994. It contains the only example of species rich lowland heath in Aberdeen City. It is a Site of Special Scientific Interest (SSSI).

== Site history ==
Scotstown Moor once formed part of extensive areas of heath and bog around Aberdeen. Other similar habitats such as Ferryhill Moss and Stocket Moor, lying closer to the city, have long since disappeared, being lost to housing. Scotstown Moor remained largely intact up to the 20th century, mainly as a result of its status as a Commonty. This system of land tenure protected the site from enclosure and reclamation by local landowners. Records from 1894 show that the site was not maintained without a struggle, being "coveted by neighboring lairds", and that several encroachments had been made onto the site.

Although the site's status gave the public free access, Scotstown Moor was the property of the Bishopric of Aberdeen and was farmed by the proprietor of Perwinnes. Furthermore, the feuars of Old Aberdeen were granted rights of common grazing, sod cutting, and peat cutting, although little direct evidence of these activities remains today. A Children's Camp was built on the site and ran from the early 1900s until the start of the Second World War. The camp catered for undernourished children, convalescents, and those showing symptoms of tuberculosis.

Throughout the early part of this century Scotstown Moor suffered some habitat degradation, largely due to drainage operations. However, the Second World War brought major problems for the site. The need for increased agricultural output led to the reclamation of part of the site, which was then put under intensive cattle grazing. This probably resulted in extensive areas of heather being replaced by grassland. The overall effect has led to fragmentation of the site, particularly serious for the bogs which became more and more isolated, and therefore vulnerable to external influences.

In 1869, there was a much larger area of moorland and rural setting compared with today. Currently, Scotstown Moor is surrounded on three sides by housing. There is a new road and conifer plantations to the north.

In April 1943, Aberdeen was bombed heavily by the Luftwaffe, a number of bombs were dropped on Scotstown wood adjacent to the moor.

During the 1970s, the site faced further pressures. Ownership of the site had passed to the tenant of Perwinnes, who intended to either convert the site fully to agriculture or sell it for housing development. At this time the local authority felt that the site area should remain as a "green wedge" within new housing planned for the area. However, since the council's "Environmental Improvement Scheme" involved the clearance of scrub and the afforestation of the moor, this option was hardly less destructive than full scale development.

In 1971 the site was notified as a Site of Special Scientific Interest (SSSI) by the Nature Conservancy Council (now NatureScot) largely on the strength of its wet heath and bog. This designation probably protected the site from various planned land-uses which would have proved highly damaging, including drainage, afforestation, housing, and conversion to a golf course. However, housing developments continued around Scotstown Moor, increasing pressure to the site.

In 1980, despite the opposition of the NCC, the University of Aberdeen and the Scottish Wildlife Trust (SWT), a new road (Dubford Road) was constructed across one of the wettest and most species rich areas of boy. This resulted not only in the loss of valuable habitat, but also created a new source of pollution close to the moor and almost certainly affected the site's drainage patterns. In 1983 planning permission was granted for housing on over 0.5 ha of land within the SSSI. The remaining part of the SSSI passed into the hands of the local authority, which also acquired land to the north in 1986. The Local Nature Reserve now consists of these two areas.

== Changes in the vegetation over the last 130 years ==
A comparison of vegetation surveys of Scotstown Moor, performed in 1968 and 1998, shows that the number of plant species in the area has declined. Species have been lost from all habitat types, although those of the open water and open/waste ground have suffered the most. For example, marsh arrowgrass (Triglochin palustris), early marsh orchid (Dactylorhiza incarnata), common twayblade (Listera cordata), corn spurrey (Spergula arvensis) and various species of dead nettle (Lamium spp.) have all been lost from the site.

The proportion of introduced species at the site has increased significantly from <1% in 1896 to >5% in 1998. This is partly due to planting of non-native conifers (Pinus contorta, Picea abies, Picea sitchensis and Larix decidua) and broadleaves (Acer platanoides), but others, such as Matricaria discoides and Veronica persica (annuals) and Reynoutria japonica (a more persistent and highly invasive species) appear to have colonized naturally.

Native tree species which have appeared since 1868 include Betula pendula, Quercus robus, Crataegus monogyna, Prunus avium and Prunus padus. These are all likely to be present in nearby woodland and have probably invaded as a result of natural succession. Willows such as Salix aurita and Salix cinerea are also found in the reserve, although two other species of willow have been lost since 1868.

== Site description ==
The site forms a gentle south facing slope, falling from 80 m to about 60 m above sea level. As a result, drainage is from north to south. The moor falls into the catchment of the Silver Burn, which flows to the south of the site. Seepage of groundwater from the north and west, combined with flow from several springs, feeds the bog formed in a shallow basin at the south end of the reserve. The major soil type is a peaty podzol, freely drained beneath an iron pan. In the southern part of the site, the soils are freely drained iron podzols formed from fluvio-glacial sands and gravel.

The reserve is bordered to the east and the west by housing development. Also to the west lies Galshie How, an area of woodland, scrub, and amenity grassland. To the north of the reserve there is an area of unmanaged heathland, grassland, and gorse scrub. More housing is found to the south, as well as mature mixed woodland (part of the Denmore Park estate).

Summary of habitat types and species at Scotstown Moor

Scotstown Moor consists of four main habitat types including gorse scrub, plantation woodland, marshy grassland, and bog/nutrient rich flushes/standing water. The presence of the nutrient rich flushes makes the site unique in the area, providing the basis for a diverse plant community containing several species of interest.

- Gorse scrub

Mainly restricted to the southern part of the site, gorse scrub occurs in patches of varying sizes bordered by both bog and grassland. It has been extending into the bog area in recent years. Dominants plants include gorse (Ulex europaeus), cross-leaved heath (Erica tetralix) in wet patches, bell heather (Erica cinerea), heather (Calluna vulgaris) and bramble ([Rubus fruticosus). Other species of note include broom ([Cystisus scoparius) and bracken (Pteridium aquilinum).

Gorse is a nitrogen-fixing legume which can invade heathlands and grasslands. It regrows after burning or cutting. Its young shoots may be grazed, but mature branches are too spiny. Gorse provides a nesting site for birds such as the yellowhammer and whitethroat. Broom is another invasive woody N-fixing legume. Bracken is one of the commonest and most widespread ferns in the world. It is often the dominant vegetation on heaths, moors, open woods and neglected pastures, especially on acid light soils. Burning encourages its spread since this destroys other plants but does not harm the deep rhizomes of bracken.

- Plantation woodland

A 50m wide strip of conifers runs across the top of the reserve and extends for approximately 200 m down the eastern boundary. The trees, originally planted as a shelterbelt, include Scots pine (Pinus sylvestris), lodgepole pine (Pinus contorta), Norway spruce (Picea abies), sitka spruce (Picea sitchensis) and larch (Larix decidua).

Of the five tree species listen above, only one (Scots pine) is native. The trees provide a feeding and nesting ground for many birds. The ground flora in this area of the reserve is sparse due to the dense tree canopy, but understory species include the nettle (Urtica diocia), bramble (Rubus fruticosus) and broad buckler fern (Dryopteris dilatata) - plants which often characterise pine plantations on areas cleared of alder (Alnus glutinosa) which is still found on site.

- Peat bog/nutrient rich flushes/ponds

This is the most natural and species rich habitat in Scotstown Moor, supporting plant species now rare in north-east Scotland. The bogs and flushes occur mainly in the southern half of Scotstown moor, although there is a pond in the north-west corner of the site, and a small acid bog in the eastern part of the conifer plantation. Some of the more unusual bog plants include bogbean (Menyanthes trifoliata), grass of parnassus (Parnassia palustris), northern marsh orchid (Dactylorhiza purpurella), lesser butterfly orchid (Platanthera bifolia), common butterwort (Pinquicula vulgaris), round-leaved sundew (Drosera rotundifolia) and black-bog rush (Schoenus nigricans).

The 'bog plants' are so called because they are restricted to waterlogged sites, surviving anoxic soil conditions and low fertility. P. vulgaris and D. rotundifolia are insectivorous, supplementing the poor supply of minerals in boggy areas by digesting insects. S. nigricans is a regionally important species in Aberdeenshire, since although a fairly common species on the west of Scotland, it is only found at Scotstown Moor in the east of Scotland.

Other species found in these areas include rushes (Juncus), sedges (Carex), cotton-sedges (Eriophorum), cross-leaved heath (Erica tetralix), marsh bedstraw (Galium palustre), tufted hair grass (Deschampsia cespitosa) and Sphagnum species.

- Grassland

The grassland at Scotstown Moor includes both unimproved and improved areas. The area at the top of Corse hill, north of the conifer plantation, has been grazed in the past, but has not been drained or reseeded. The grassland south of the plantation, however, was ploughed, seeded, and fertilized during the Second World War.

The dominant grasses, particularly in the improved grassland, are Yorkshire fog (Holcus lanatus) and cocksfoot (Dactylis glomerata).

Yorkshire fog a very widespread and versatile grass able to exploit widely different soil conditions and management practices. It may, however, be limited by grazing or heavy trampling. It is most frequent on relatively fertile soils (pH 5.0–6.0) and is more abundant on moist rather than waterlogged soils, although it can survive in anaerobic conditions. Cocksfoot, another widespread grass, tolerates summer grazing but fares better where grazing is infrequent. It is usually considered to be susceptible to trampling but survives light burning.

Other grasses at Scotstown Moor include species of Poa, Lolium, Deschampsia and Agrostis. Heath bedstraw (Galium saxatile) and soft rush (Juncus effusus) are also common but species diversity is unexpectedly low in the grasslands.

== Scotstown Moor Fauna ==
There is evidence of rabbits (Oryctolagus cuniculus) and moles (Talpa europaea) at Scotstown Moor and foxes (Vulpes vulpes) and roe deer (Capreolus capreolus) have also been seen in the area. Rabbits graze especially in the grasslands, reducing the biomass of dominant grasses. Voles (Family Muridae) and shrews (Family Soricidae) inhabit the grassland and are preyed on by owls (Asio spp.), sparrowhawks (Accipitur nisus) and kestrels (Falco tinnunculus). Bird life also includes skylarks (Alauda arvensis), which nest in the rough grassland, and various birds that nest in the scrub and woodland.

Several species of moths, butterflies, and freshwater invertebrates are also found on the site (listed in "Scotstown Moor - a children's guide") and the two small ponds provide a habitat for frogs as well as ducks and other wildfowl.

== Military use ==
The Ministry of Defence owns a small 25 acre driver training area, attached to Aberdeen University Officers' Training Corps.

== See also ==
- Green spaces and walkways in Aberdeen
