= Marcus Sachs =

Marcus Sachs (1812–1869) was a Polish Jew who emigrated to Scotland and became Professor of Hebrew at the Free Church Divinity Hall in Aberdeen (later known as Christ's College).

== Life ==
He was born the son of an engineer in Inowroclaw in the Grand Duchy of Posen in what is now central Poland. He studied at Berlin University.

He came to Britain in 1842 and converted to Christianity. He was baptised by Rev John Brown at Broughton Place church soon after arriving. He enrolled to train as a Free Church minister at New College, Edinburgh in 1843. He began teaching Hebrew at the Free Church College in Aberdeen in 1846. He was made a Professor in 1855.

He lived his final years at Kepplestone Cottage in Rubislaw, Aberdeen.

He died at Polmuir in Aberdeen on 29 September 1869.

== Family ==
In 1850, somewhat late in life, he married Mary Shier (1809-1915) a few years his senior. She was the daughter of David Shier, a surveyor in Aberdeen. They married at Old Machar, and did not have children. She married after he died, Francis Edmond, a Haddington advocate. She also outlived her second husband and died in Cardiff aged 105, leaving a considerable fortune.

== Publications ==
- The Prophetic Agency (1855)
- The Scattered Nation (joint author with Rev Adolph Saphir)
