= Ferryhill, Aberdeen =

District of Aberdeen, Scotland

Coordinates: 57.1369°N 2.1046°W

Ferryhill
- Location within the Aberdeen City council area Location within Scotland
- OS grid reference: NJ937052
- Council area: Aberdeen City
- Lieutenancy area: Aberdeen
- Country: Scotland
- Sovereign state: United Kingdom
- Post town: Aberdeen
- Dialling code: 01224
- Police: Scotland
- Fire: Scottish
- Ambulance: Scottish
- UK Parliament: Aberdeen South
- Scottish Parliament: Aberdeen Central

Ferryhill is a district in Aberdeen, on the north-east coast of Scotland, United Kingdom. Duthie Park is located in the area.

== History ==
The lands of Ferryhill had belonged to the Trinity Friars, who feued them out to the powerful Menzies dynasty. After the Reformation of 1560, the lands of Ferryhill became the property of the Crown.

Dr Patrick Dun purchased the lands of Ferryhill in 1629 for no other purpose than to bequest them, and all property thereon, by his will to the 'Toune of Aberdeine' for the maintenance of four masters at the Grammar school. Dr Dun bequeathed the whole of this extensive property to the Provost, Baillies and Council of Aberdeen for this specific purpose. He directed that the rents obtained from these lands should be invested until enough money accumulated to buy another piece of land sufficient to yield, along with the original gift, a yearly revenue of 1,200 merks, this sum being sufficient to pay the basic salaries of the stipulated staff of 4 masters, including the Rector.

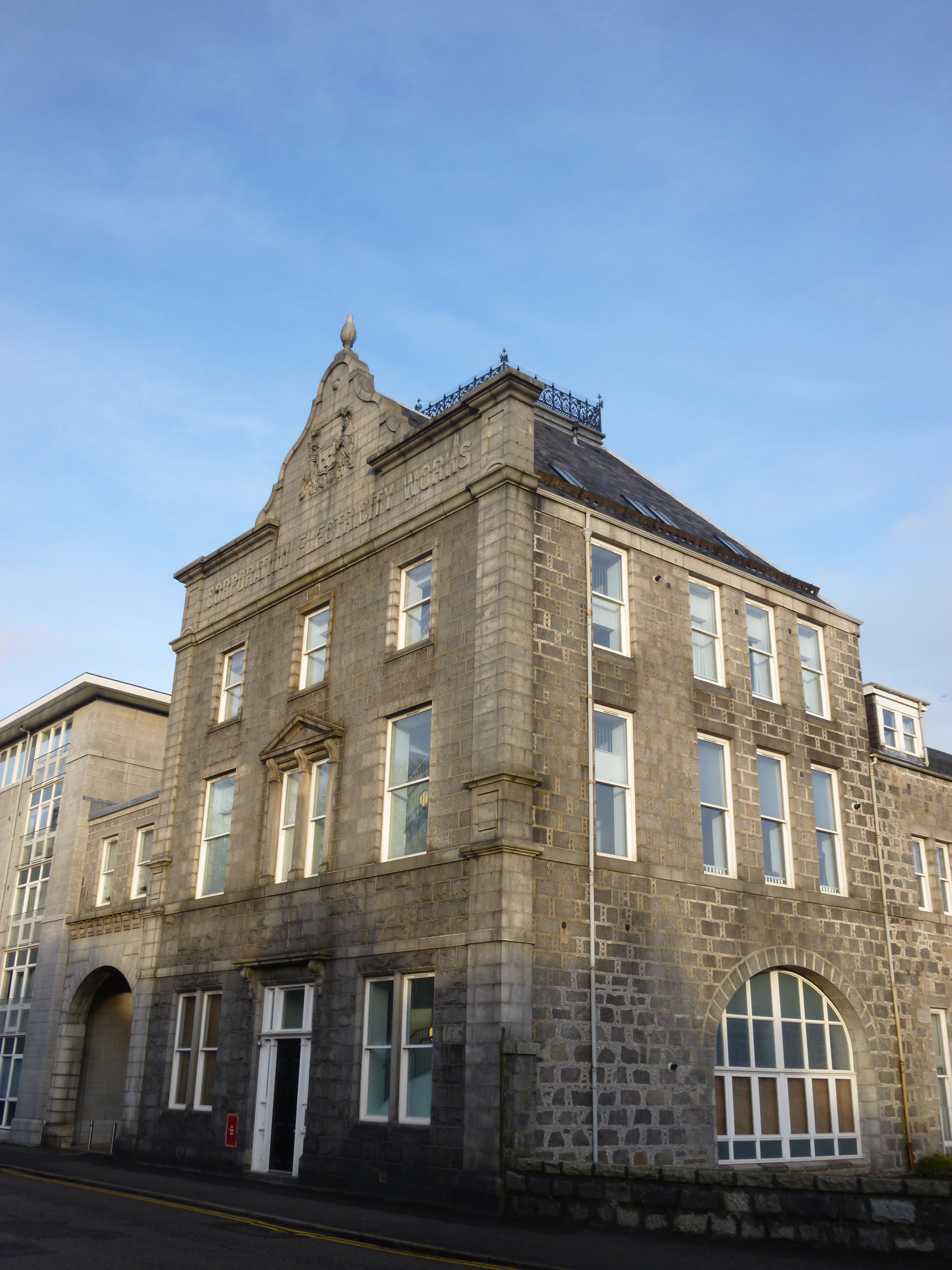
Corporation Electricity Works, Ferryhill Aberdeen

The Lands of Ferryhill consisted in those days of bogs fit only for rough grazing, and were described by Francis Douglas even as late as 1728 as amounting to 'little conical hills over-run with heath and furze ... the flat bottoms between them drenched with stagnant water'.

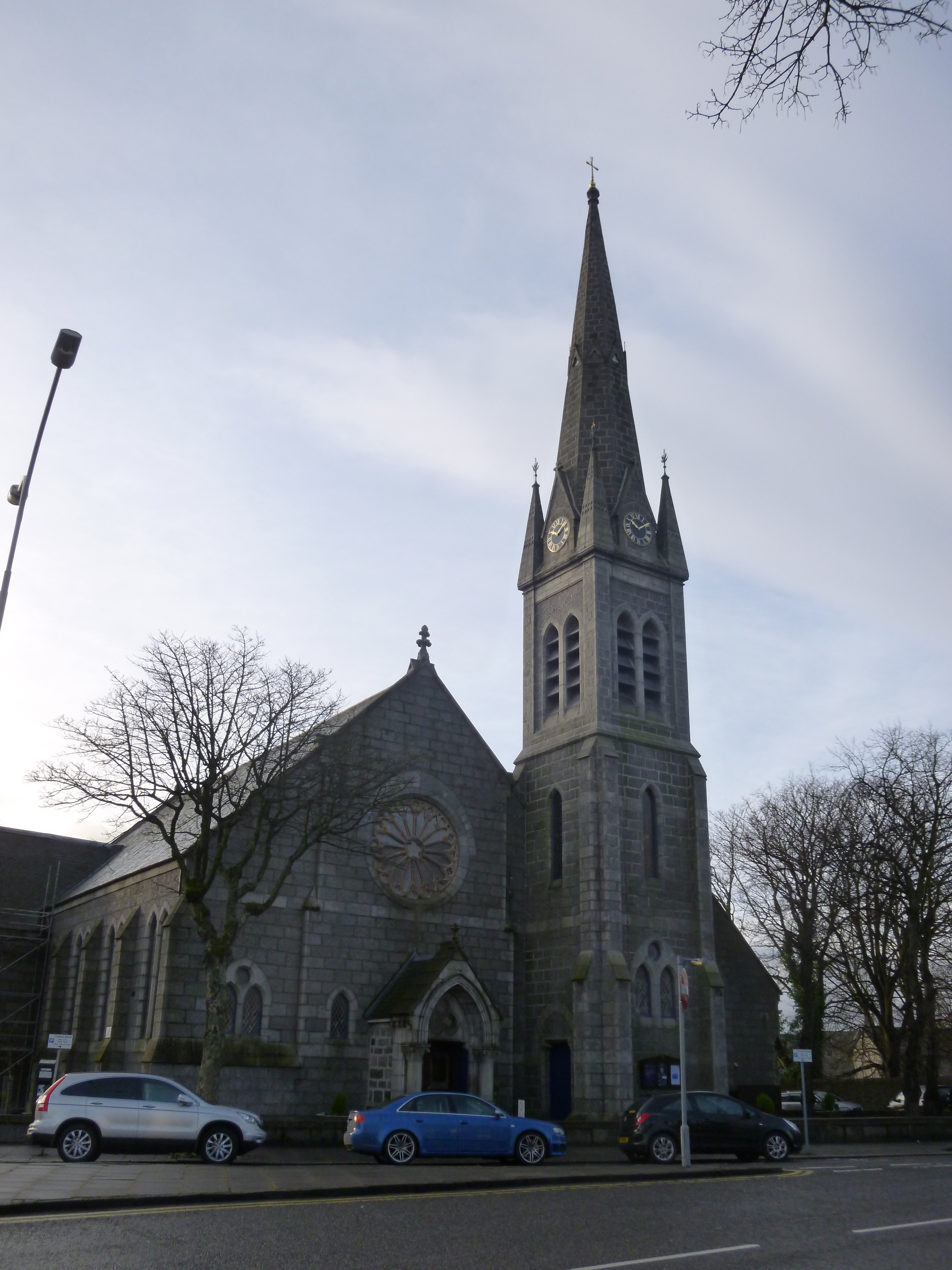
Ferryhill Parish Church, Aberdeen

Ferryhill was created from the first half of the 19th century in an area occupied by grand villas such as Ferryhill House, Devanha House, Ferryhill Lodge, East bank, Maryfield and Fonthill. Ferryhill Place was set out by Archibald Simpson from the 1830s and was well developed with terraced properties by 1866.

At the time a small number of plots were set out in Marine Terrace. By the turn of the 20th century the Terrace was complete. Significant further expansion continued following the Aberdeen Municipality Extension Act 1871 (34 & 35 Vict. c. cxli). Ferryhill could be considered one of Aberdeen's 1st historic suburbs and an important historic residential area of the city. The 1871 act also saw the city boundary extended to take in North Broadford, Fountainhall, Mannofield and Broomhill. 19th century expansion was predominantly a result of private sector speculation by the Trades and through the Land Association, later the City of Aberdeen Land Association.

Today Ferryhill is a popular suburb close to Aberdeen City Centre.

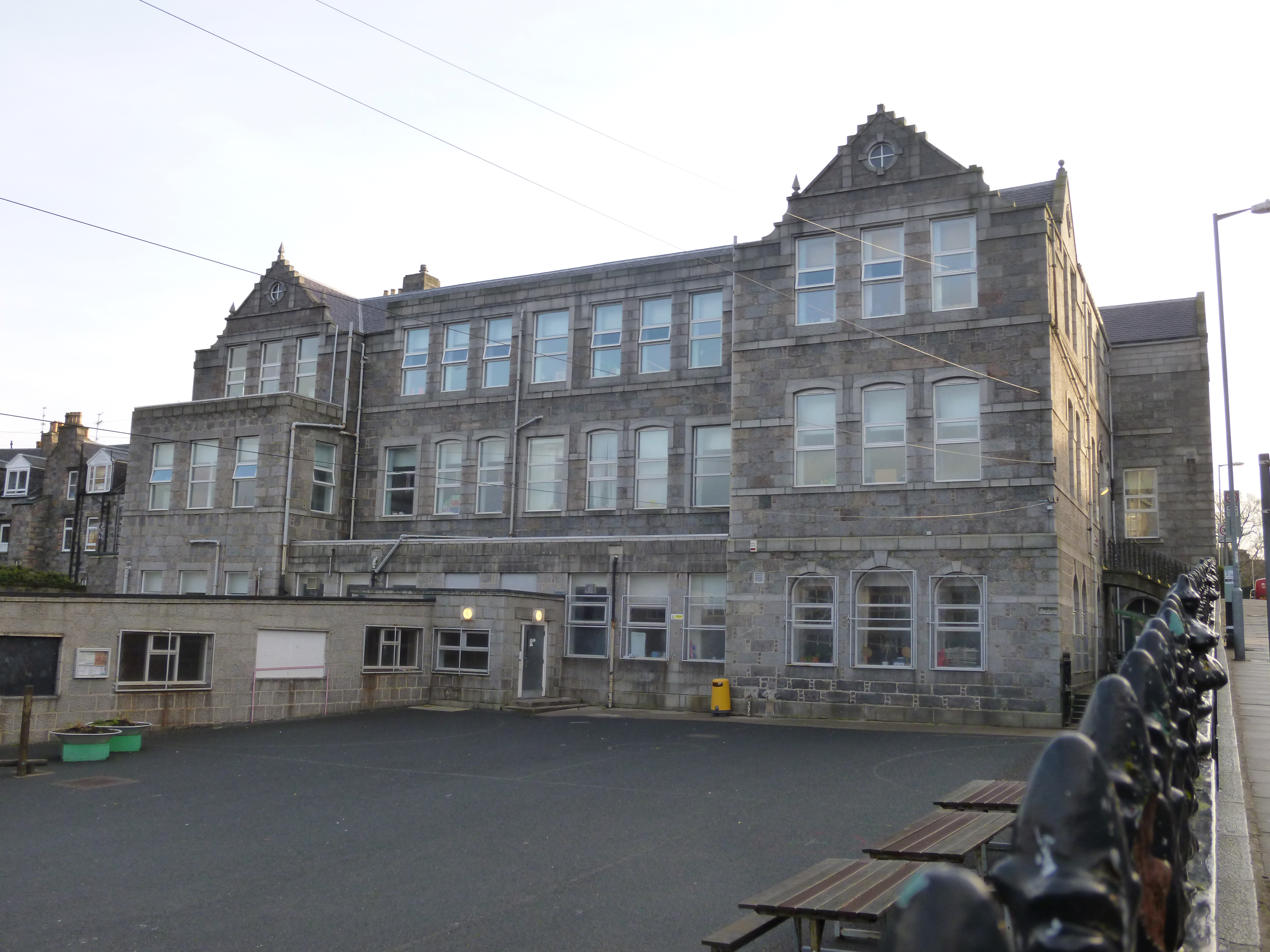
Ferryhill Primary School, Aberdeen

== Ferryhill Primary School ==
Ferryhill Primary School is a primary school located in the Ferryhill area of Aberdeen, Scotland. The school has about 350 pupils, making it one of the largest primary schools in Aberdeen. It is a feeder school to Harlaw Academy, along with Broomhill Primary School and Kaimhill Primary School.

=== Notable alumni ===
- Robert Grierson Combe – Received the Victoria Cross medal in the First World War.
- Fraser Fyvie – Aberdeen F.C. Midfielder.
