= Victoria Park, Aberdeen =

Park in Aberdeen, Scotland

Victoria Park
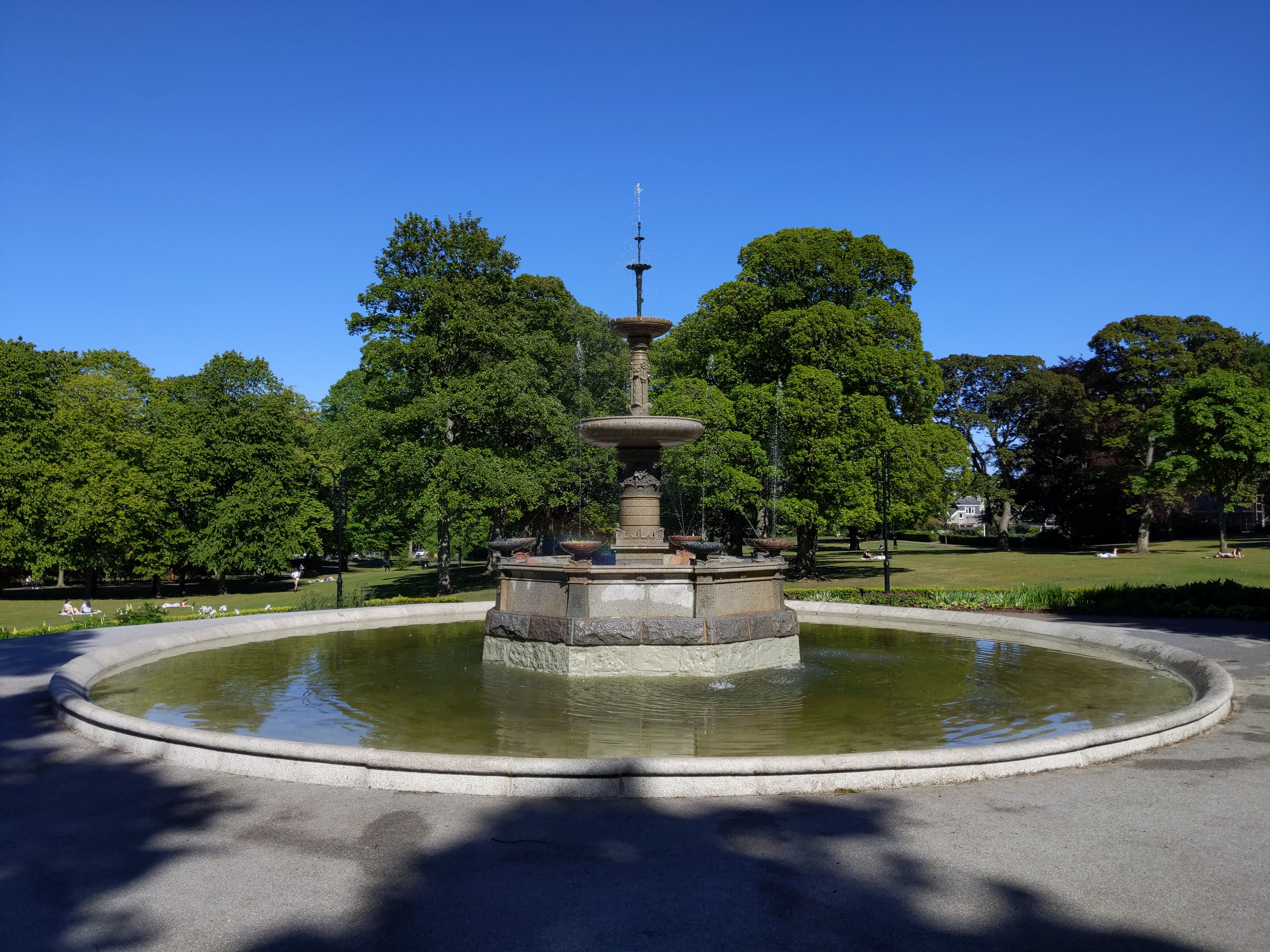
- The fountain at the centre of the park
- Interactive map of Victoria Park
- Type: Public Park
- Location: Rosemount, Aberdeen, Scotland
- Coordinates: 57°9′6″N 2°7′21″W
- Area: 5 hectares (12 acres)
- Created: 1871
- Operator: Aberdeen City Council
- Status: Open all year

Listed Building – Category A
- Official name: Victoria Park, Fountain
- Designated: 19 March 1984
- Reference no.: LB20065

Victoria Park is a small park in the city of Aberdeen, Scotland.

The park has an area of five hectares and was opened to the public in 1871. It is named after Queen Victoria. In the center of the park is a fountain made of fourteen different types of granite that was presented to the citizens of the city by the Granite Polishers and Master Builders of Aberdeen. A greenhouse and conservatory used to present in the south-east corner of the park, but were demolished in early 2014 as a result of repeated vandalism.

Restoration work on the fountain, which is category A listed, took place between September 2021 and April 2022. The work allowed the fountain to operate again.

== Gallery ==
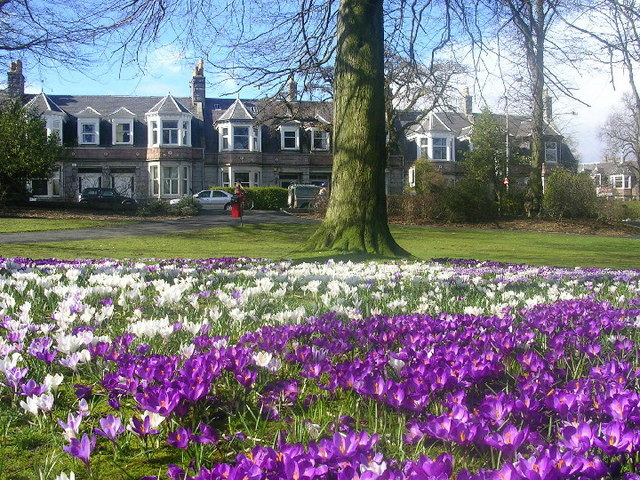
Crocuses in Victoria Park

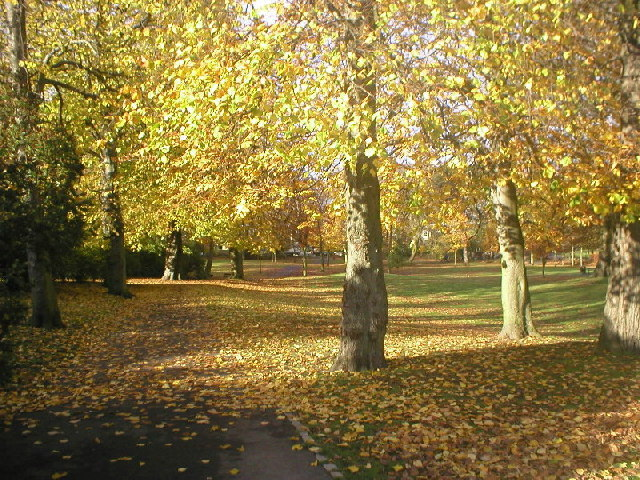
Victoria Park in Autumn

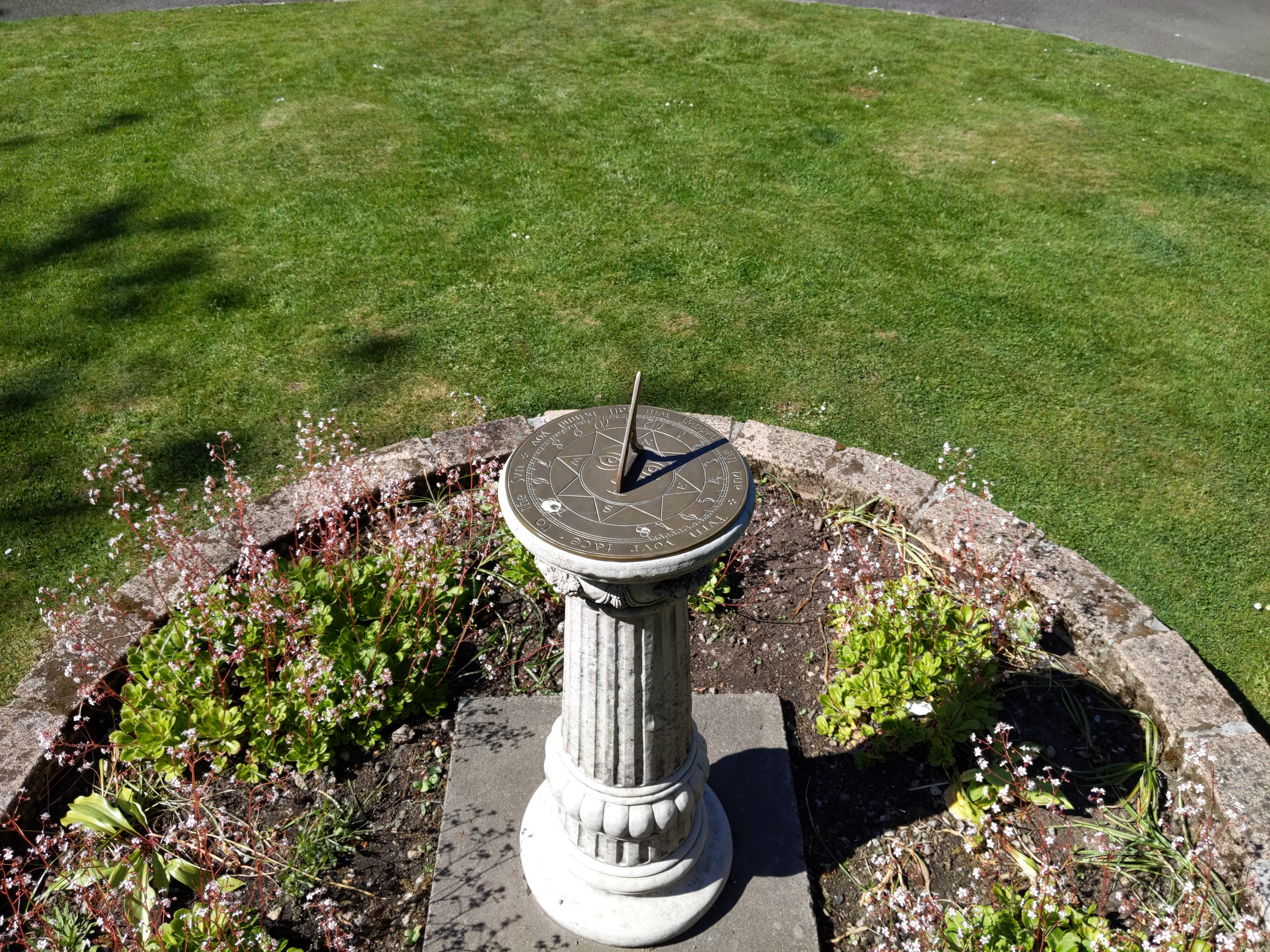
A sundial in the south of the park

== See also ==
- Green Spaces and Walkways in Aberdeen
