= Johnston Gardens =

Public park and gardens in Aberdeen, Scotland

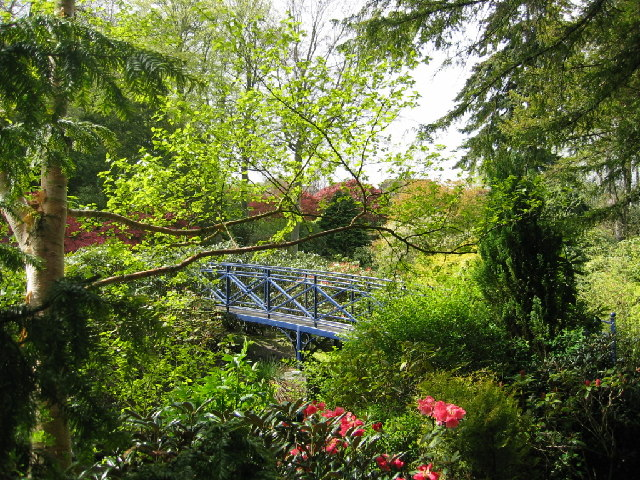
- Bridge in Johnston Gardens
- Interactive map of Johnston Gardens
- Type: Public gardens
- Location: Seafield, Aberdeen, Scotland
- Coordinates: 57°8′10″N 2°8′56″W
- Area: 1 hectare (2.5 acres)
- Operator: Aberdeen City Council
- Status: Open all year

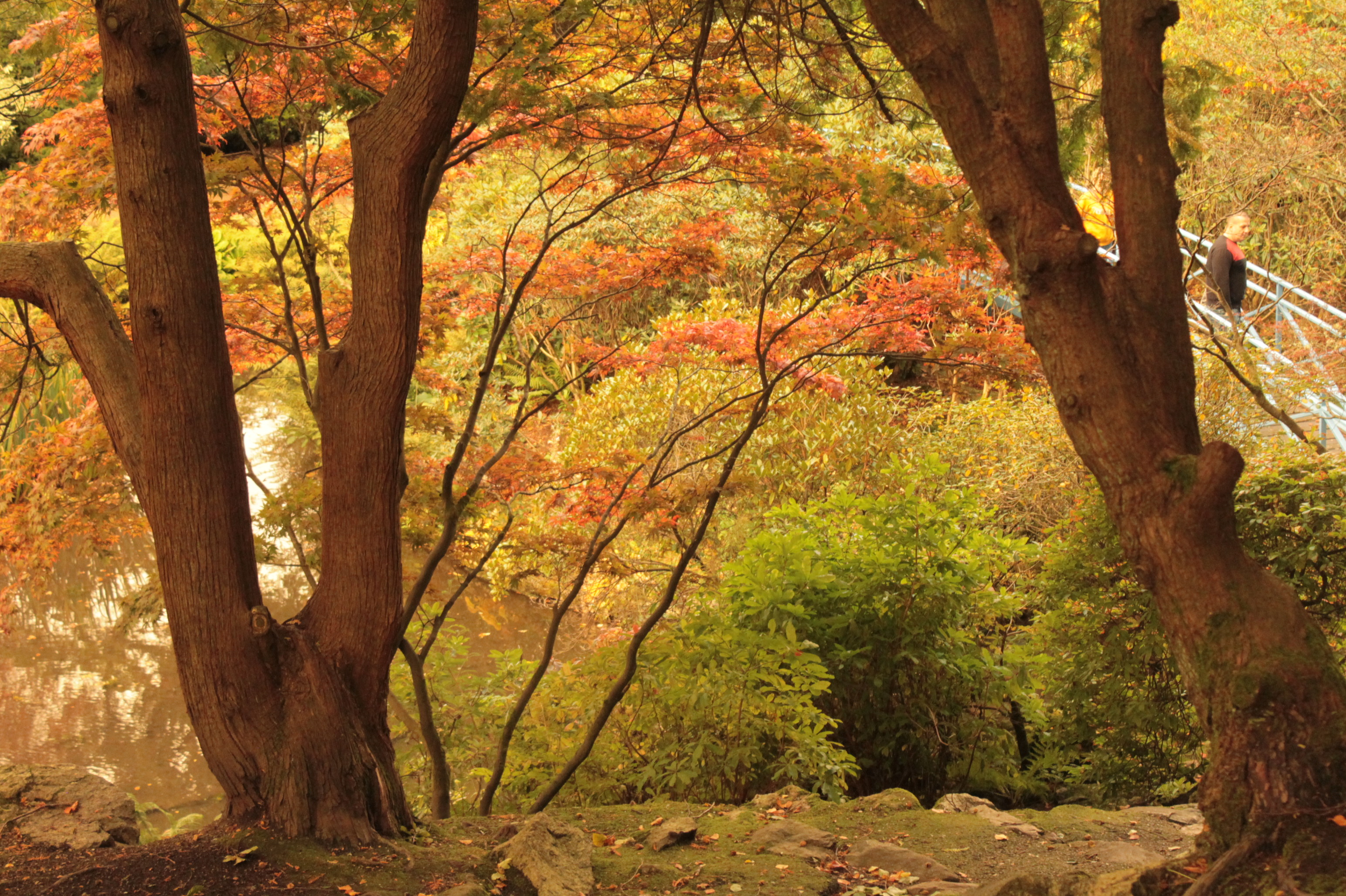
Johnston Gardens in autumn

Johnston Gardens is a small public garden in Aberdeen, Scotland. The garden has won the Britain in Bloom competition many times.

The gardens are used for weddings, both ceremonies and for photography.

== Access ==
Access is from Viewfield Road close to the Gordon Highlanders Museum in the Rubislaw district of central Aberdeen.

== History ==
The park was formerly part of the Johnston House estate, but was gifted to the city in 1936.

== Content ==
The park contains a Japanese garden centred upon a pond and arched bridge. This section contains bamboos and acers. The paths are lined with rhododendrons and tall beech trees.

== Memorials ==
The park contains a memorial to the men killed on helicopter flight G-REDL 85N on 1 April 2009.

== See also ==
- Green spaces and walkways in Aberdeen
