= Rubislaw =

Area of Aberdeen, Scotland

Coordinates: 57°08′36″N 2°08′24″W

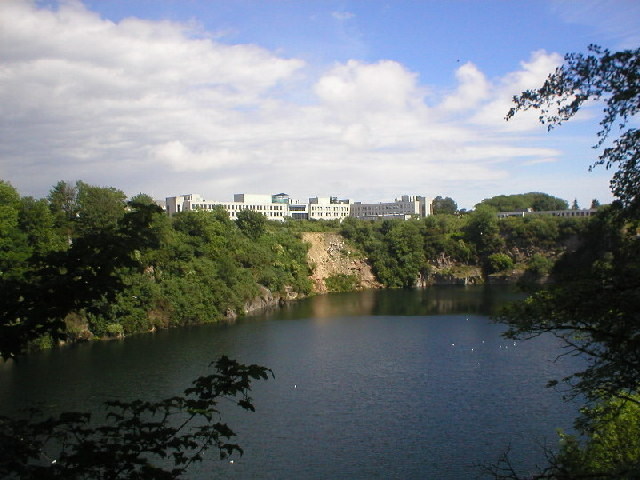
- View overlooking Rubislaw quarry

- Location within the Aberdeen City council area Location within Scotland
- Council area: Aberdeen City
- Lieutenancy area: Aberdeen
- Country: Scotland
- Sovereign state: United Kingdom
- Postcode district: AB
- Police: Scotland
- Fire: Scottish
- Ambulance: Scottish

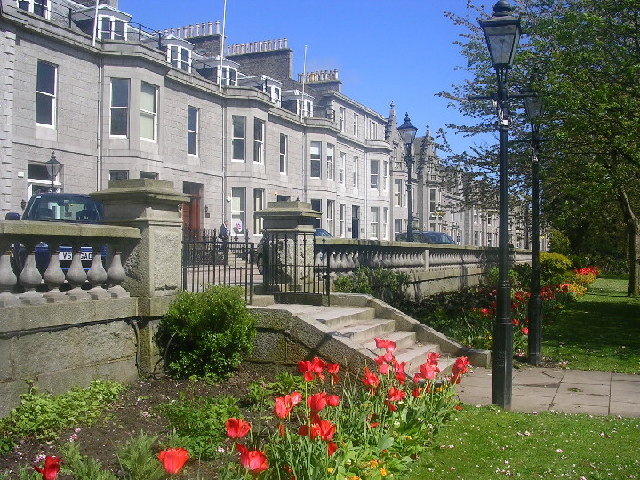
View of Granite houses on Rubislaw Terrace, from Rubislaw Terrace Gardens

Rubislaw is an area of Aberdeen, Scotland. It is located in the area between Queen's Road and King's Gate, including Rubislaw Den North and South. It is close to Rubislaw Quarry and the Rubislaw Playing Fields used by Aberdeen Grammar School. The buildings of the area are primarily Victorian or 1930s.

Before becoming a suburb of the city, Rubislaw was a landed estate belonging to the Skene family. Their seat, Rubislaw House, stood on what is now Queen's Road and was of 17th century date. It was demolished in 1886 and succeeded by an elaborate Gothic Revival villa of the same name.

== Attractions ==
- Gordon Highlanders Museum
- Johnston Gardens

== Notable residents ==
- Prof Robert Douglas Lockhart FRSE LLD (1894–1987), Professor of Anatomy at Aberdeen University
- Prof Marcus Sachs (1812–1869), Professor of Hebrew at Aberdeen University
