= Westburn Park =

Urban park in Aberdeen, Scotland

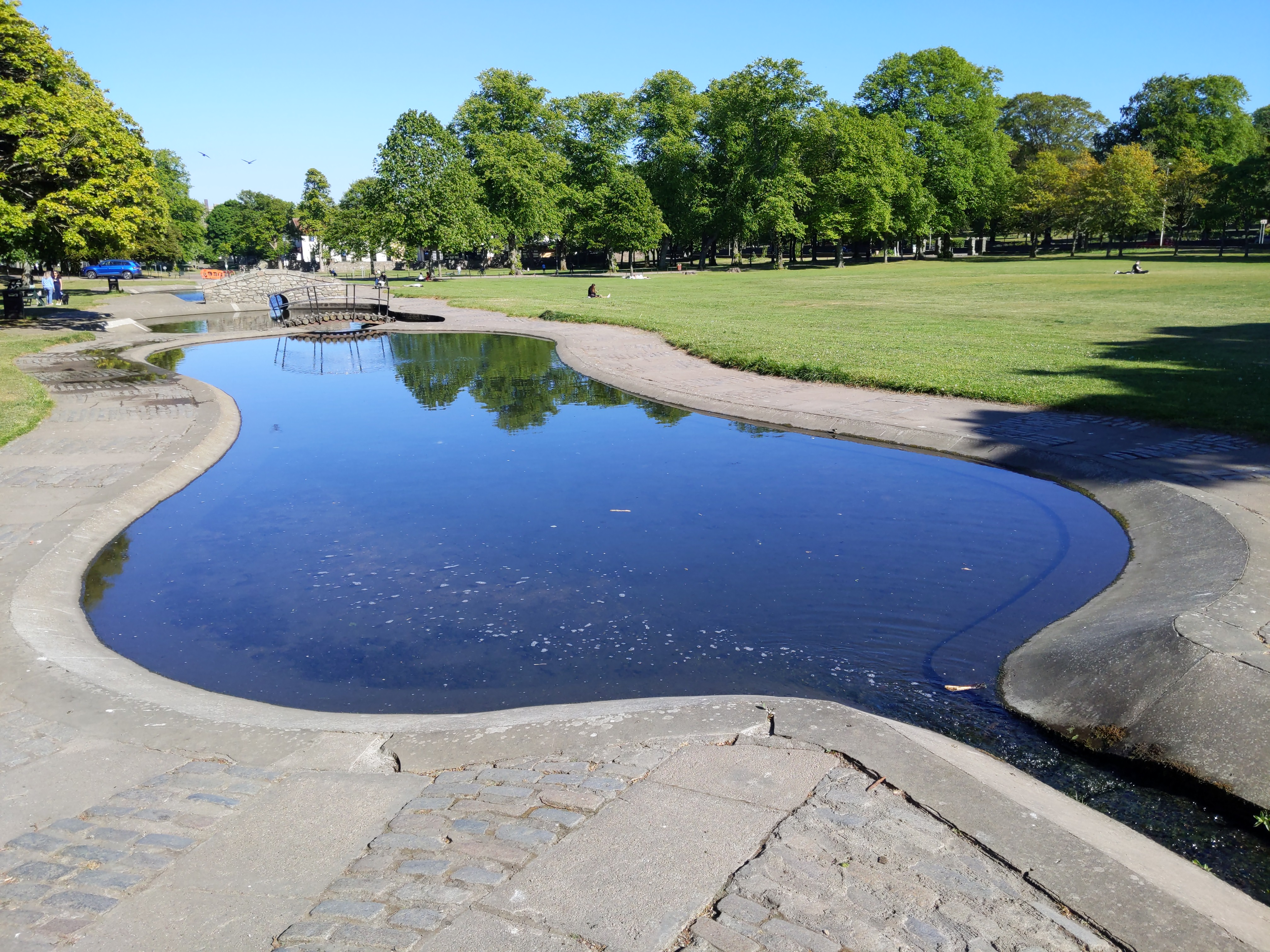
- The Westburn
- Interactive map of Westburn Park
- Type: Public Park
- Location: Aberdeen, Scotland
- Coordinates: 57°9′13″N 2°7′22″W
- Area: 10 hectares (25 acres)
- Created: (laid out in) 1901
- Operator: Aberdeen City Council
- Status: Open all year

Listed Building – Category A
- Official name: Westburn House, Including Railings
- Designated: 12 January 1967
- Reference no.: LB20108

Westburn Park is a public park in Aberdeen, Scotland. It is owned by Aberdeen City Council and is one of the largest parks in the city, with an area of 10 hectares.

It does not have flowerbeds or gardens and is mainly grass with some trees. There are two large ponds and a stream, the Gilcomston Burn, flows through the south of the park.

There is a cycle track area for children. This comprises miniature roads with road signs to teach children about how roads work. The children's playground includes metal climbing frames.

There is a skatepark that was originally built in the 1970s and was refurbished in 2018 following an award of £105,000 to the Friends of Victoria and Westburn Park from Aberdeen City Council.

The Aberdeen Tennis Centre located in the park is a large indoor tennis centre with four indoor courts. It provides tennis lessons and court hire. There are also four outdoor all weather courts and four grass courts which are available to members only.

Westburn House is a Victorian listed building located in the centre of the park. It has been derelict since 1998 when plans to convert it into a venue for civil weddings failed to materialise. A local community group, Save Westburn House Action Group, launched a crowdfunding campaign to fully restore the property in 2019.

There is a grass bowls green where the British Isles Bowls Championships has been held in the past. The World Singles Champion of Champions Bowling Tournament was held there in 2008.

In 2022, Westburn Park was host to Mela, a traditional Asian celebration of culture and community.

The Westburn Lounge, now closed, used to provide food and drinks for those in the park. Aberdeen City Council cited that the venue cost too much to run, although it is still available for special bookings.

== See also ==
- Green spaces and walkways in Aberdeen
