= Statue of William Wallace, Aberdeen =

Coordinates: 57.14764°N 2.10482°W

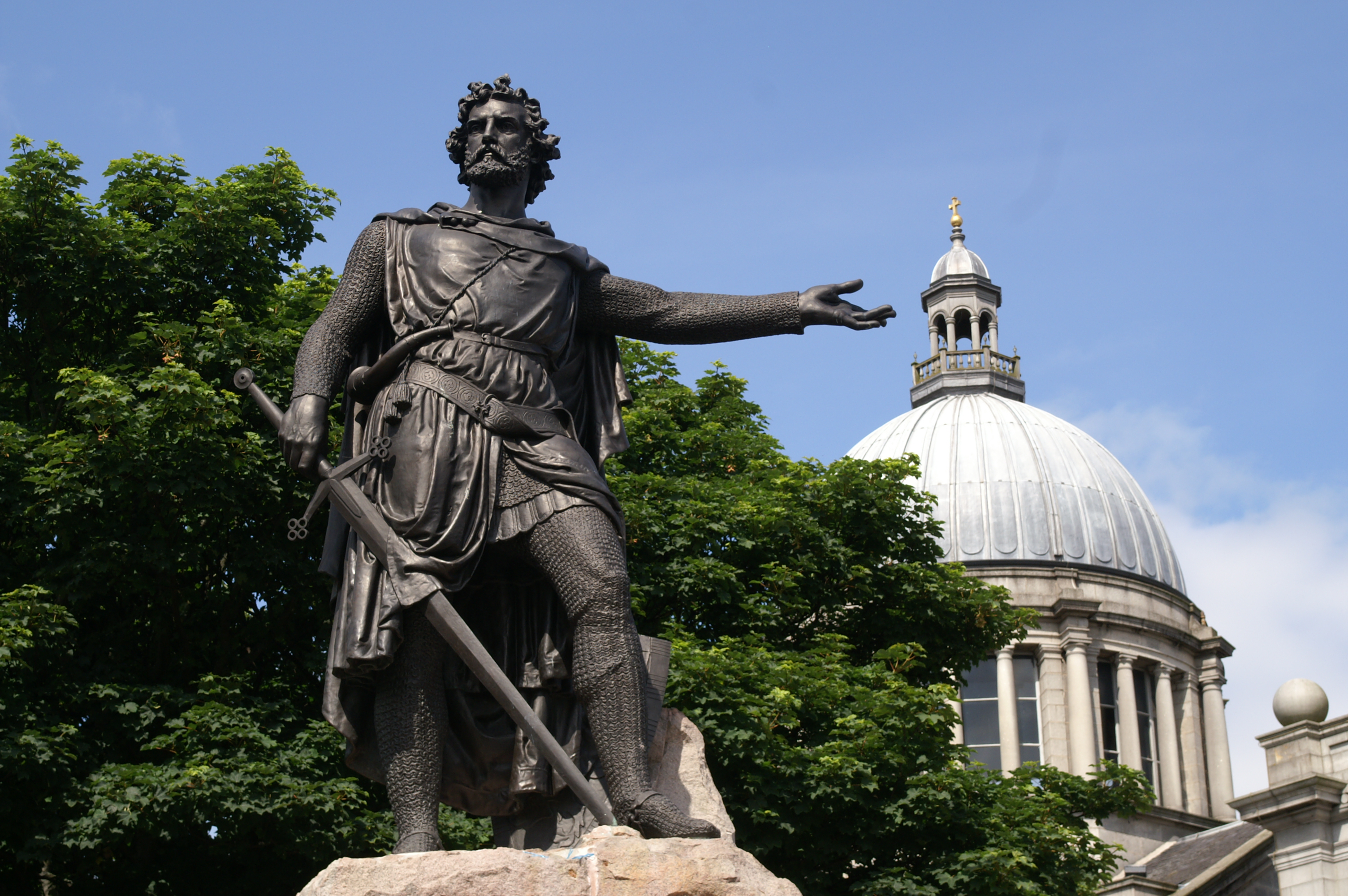
William Wallace Statue, Aberdeen

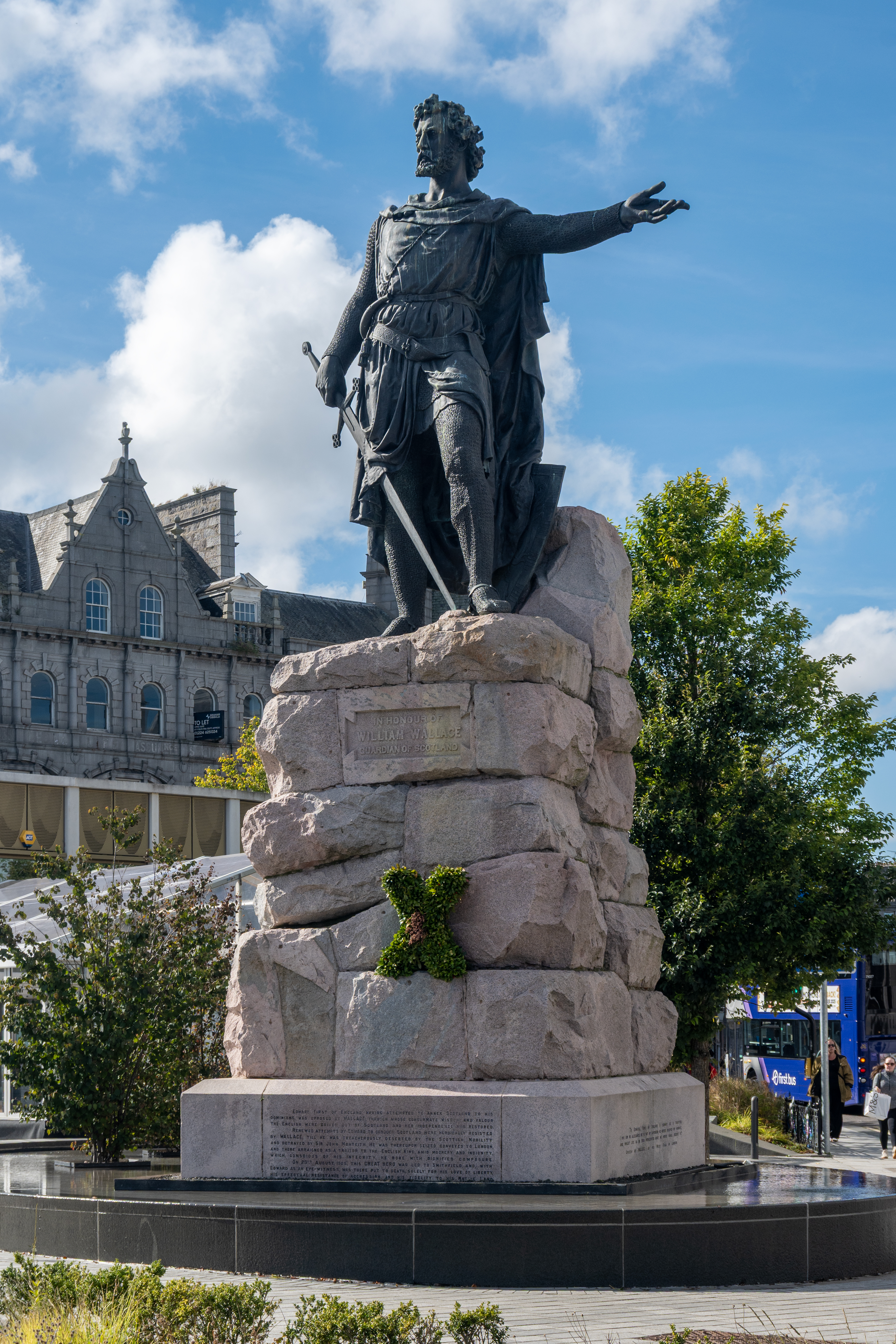
The full statue

The William Wallace Statue was erected 1888 in Aberdeen, Scotland, and depicts Sir William Wallace. Sculpted by William Grant Stevenson, the statue is positioned opposite His Majesty's Theatre and across from Union Terrace Gardens. "It was paid for with funds left for the purpose by John Steill of 38 Grange Road in Edinburgh, the son of James Steill sometime of Easter Baldowrie in Angus." It is a category B listed building.

The statue bears inscriptions on each of its four sides.

On its South facing facade, it reads: "Go back to your masters, and tell them that we came not here to treat, but to fight and set Scotland free." Answer of Wallace to the English friars sent to negotiate a pacific treaty with him before the Battle of Stirling Bridge.

On its East facing facade, it reads: Edward First of England, having attempted to annex Scotland to his dominions, was opposed by Wallace through whose consummate wisdom and valour the English were driven out of Scotland and her independence was restored. Renewed attempts to conquer Scotland by Edward were heroically resisted by Wallace, 'til he was treacherously deserted by the Scottish nobility and betrayed by Sir John Monteith. He was thereupon seized, conveyed to London, and there arraigned as a traitor to the English King, amid mockery and indignity, which, conscious of his integrity, he bore with dignified composure. On 23rd August, 1305, the great hero was led to Smithfield, and, with Edward as an eye-witness was there put to death, solely for his love of liberty, and his effectual resistance of aggression, and his fidelity to his native land.

On its North facing facade, it reads: "To Edward, King of England, I cannot be a traitor. I owe him no allegiance; as he is not my sovereign; he never received my homage, and, whilst life is in this persecuted body, he never shall receive it." Speech of Wallace at his mock trial in London.

On its West facing facade, it reads: "When I was a youth, and under the care of my Uncle, all that I could carry away from him was a single proverb, but it seemed to me above all price, and I never forgot it. It was this: - 'I tell you a truth, liberty is the best of all things, my son, never live under and slavish bond.' " Remarks by Wallace on the instructions he received from his Uncle, the Priest of Dunipace.

"I have brought you to the ring - dance according to your skill"

Wallace drew up his army at Falkirk in a circular form and addressed them as above.

== See also ==
- List of places in Aberdeen
- National Wallace Monument
