= Rubislaw and Queen's Terrace Gardens =

Two public gardens in Aberdeen, Scotland

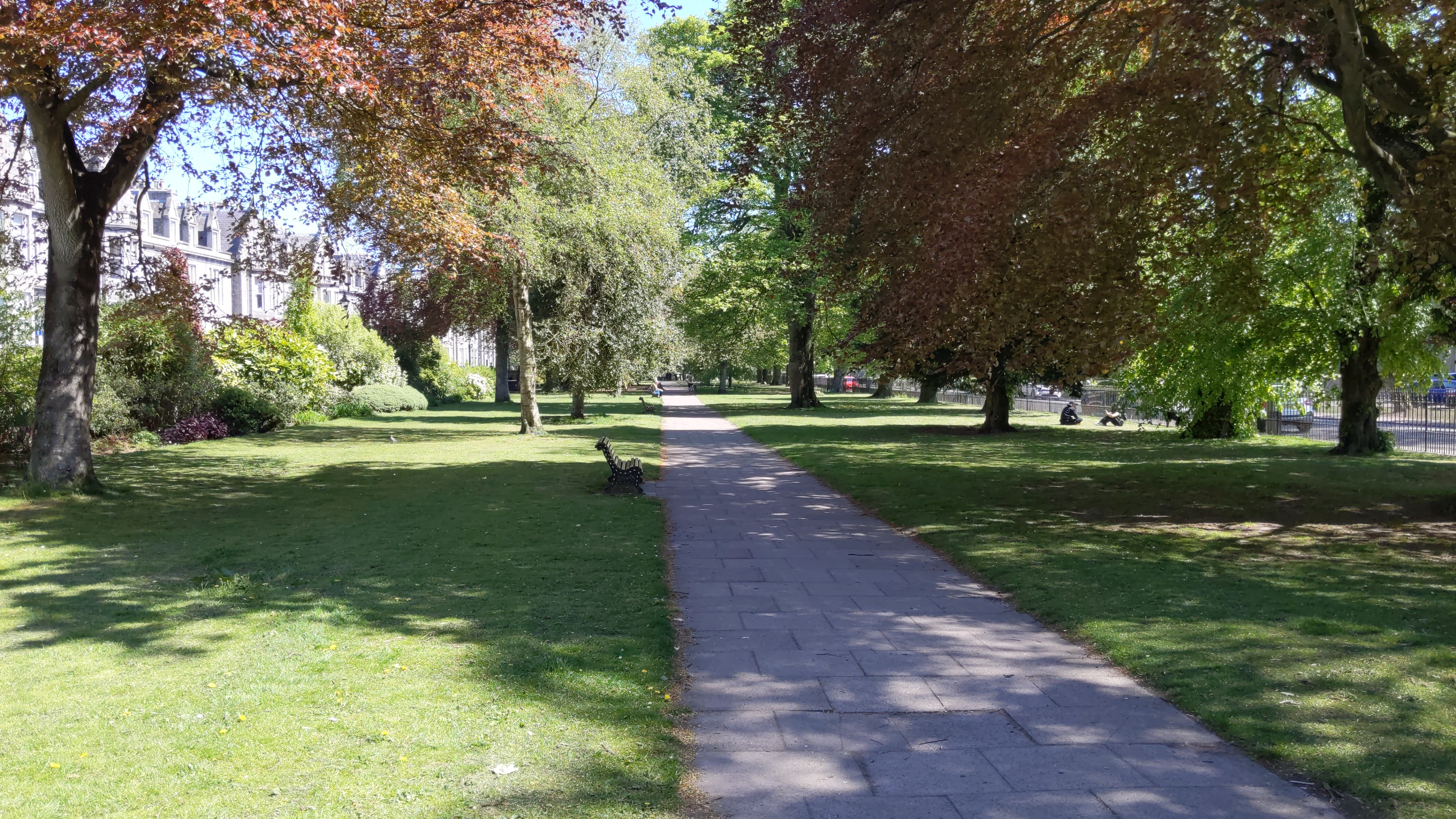
- Rubislaw Terrace Gardens, pictured from the west end in 2025
- Interactive map of Rubislaw and Queen's Terrace Gardens
- Type: Public Garden
- Location: Aberdeen, Scotland
- Coordinates: 57°8′35″N 2°7′3″W
- Area: 1 hectare (10,000 m^{2})
- Operator: Aberdeen City Council
- Status: Open all year

Listed Building – Category B
- Official name: Rubislaw Terrace
- Designated: 12 January 1967
- Reference no.: LB20476

Listed Building – Category B
- Official name: Queen's Terrace
- Designated: 26 May 1977
- Reference no.: LB20633

Rubislaw and Queen's Terrace Gardens are two small public gardens in Aberdeen, Scotland. Although they are referred to as two parks, they are separated only by one road which runs between the 1 hectare rectangular area it covers.

It is located between the streets of Rubislaw Terrace and Albyn Place, in the west-end of Aberdeen approximately 300 metres from the main street in Aberdeen, Union Street.

There is a fountain in the park made from pink granite and trees which are over a century old. On the Rubislaw Terrace (north) side of the park, there is a gray granite wall of small pillars along the entire side.

== History ==
In February 1989, the City of Aberdeen District Council and the Scottish Sculpture Workshop ran a competition to design a new fountain to be built out of granite in Rubislaw Terrace Gardens, with the chosen design to receive £5,000. The commission was awarded to Susan Ball, who based her concept of the fountain on the balustrades of the structures surrounding the park.

In 1992, the District Council allocated £100,000 to repair the surrounding structures of both gardens due to vandalism.

== Gallery ==
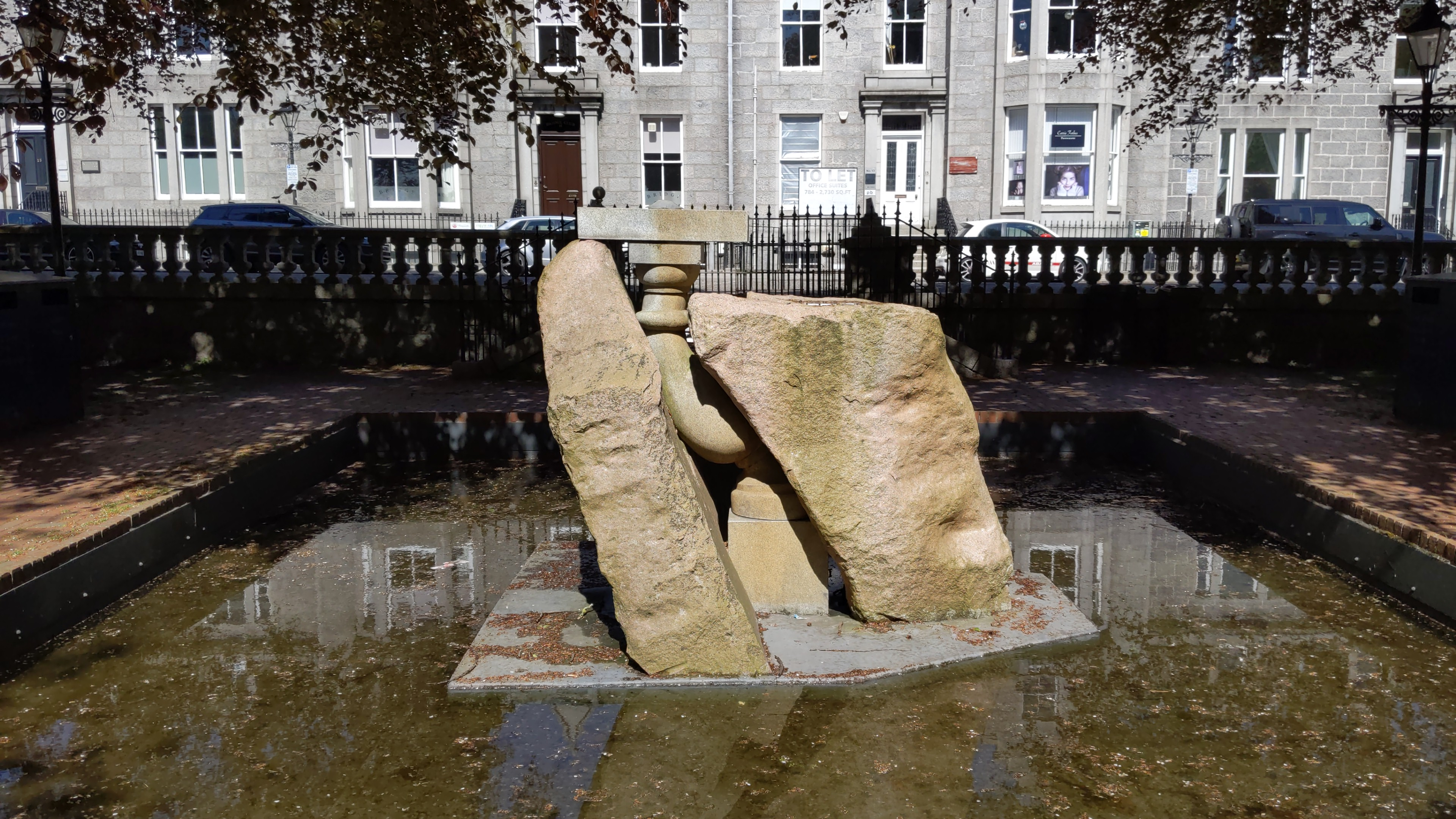
Fountain made of pink granite in the centre of the Rubislaw Terrace Gardens

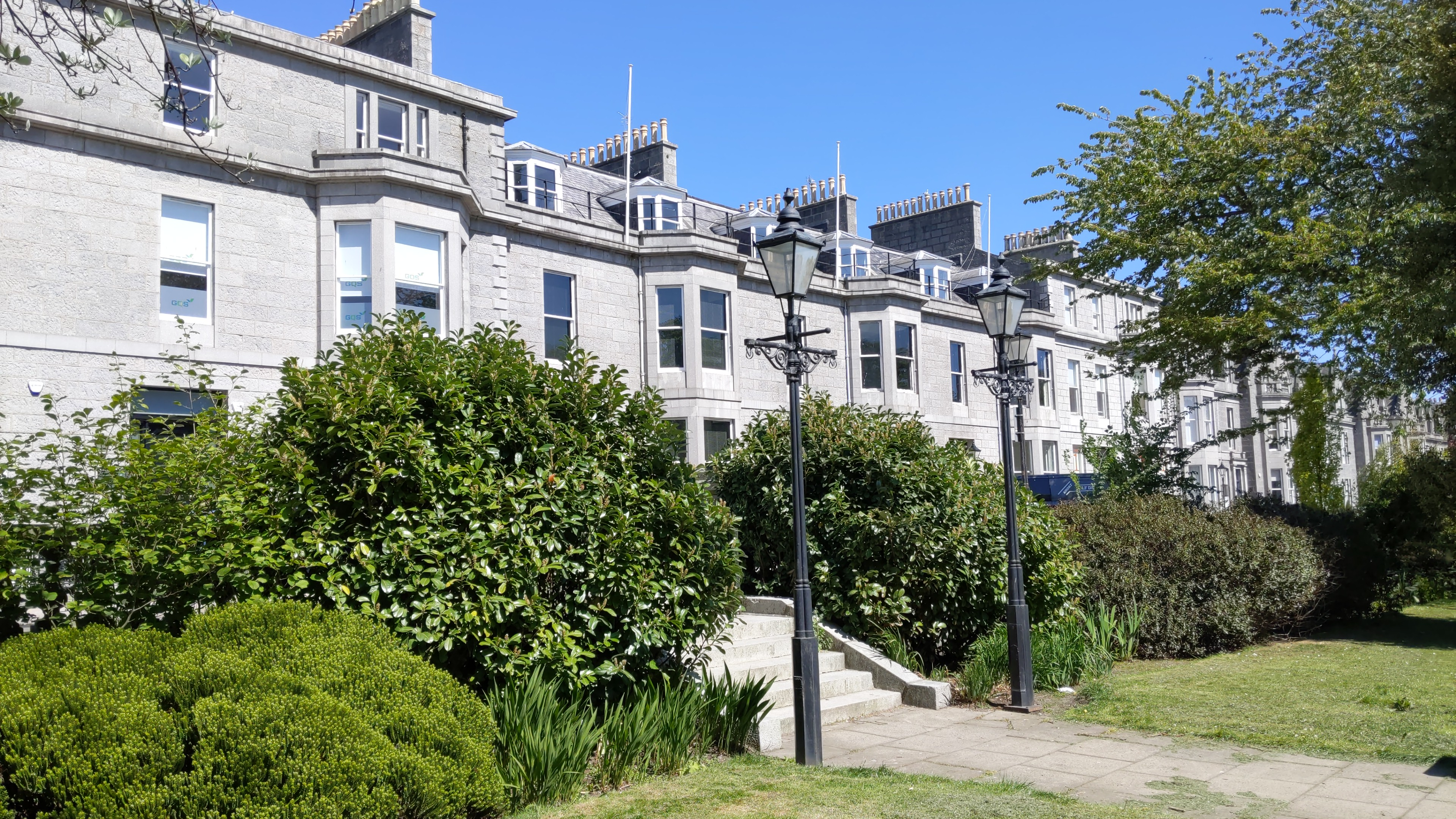
Houses on Rubislaw Terrace viewed from Queen's Terrace Gardens

== See also ==
- Green spaces and walkways in Aberdeen
