= Balnagask =

Suburb of Aberdeen, Scotland

Coordinates: 57°08′03″N 2°04′12″W

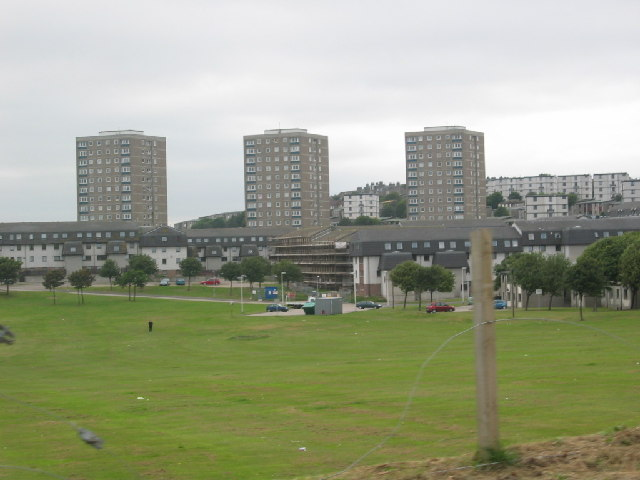
Housing in Balnagask

Balnagask is an area of Torry, a burgh of Aberdeen in Scotland. Balnagask is said to mean "the village in the hollow" in Gaelic.

The Balnagask Estate stretched from the golf course to the fields that overlooked both the Bay of Nigg and the railway line. Two farms straddled the land – Kirkhill Farm was situated on the left side of the hill and Home Farm located on land now occupied by Baxter Court. The estate also included an area of land around Balnagask Road and the top of Baxter Street.

In the 1960s Aberdeen City Council gave the go ahead for a large housing estate to be built at Balnagask. The new estate began to swallow up acres of land on the southern slopes of Torry Hill as the new cuboid shaped houses enveloped the elegant villas of Balnagask. The box shaped homes (affectionately referred to by residents as ‘The Hen Hooses’) differed wildly from the regimented ideas of past town planners. The first phase of the housing scheme was completed in 1967 and the second phase in 1969.

In August 2024, Aberdeen City Council announced that a home rebuilding programme would take place in the area after it found that 366 council properties and 138 private properties contained Reinforced Autoclaved Aerated Concrete.
