= Stewart Park, Aberdeen =

Park in Aberdeen, Scotland

Stewart Park
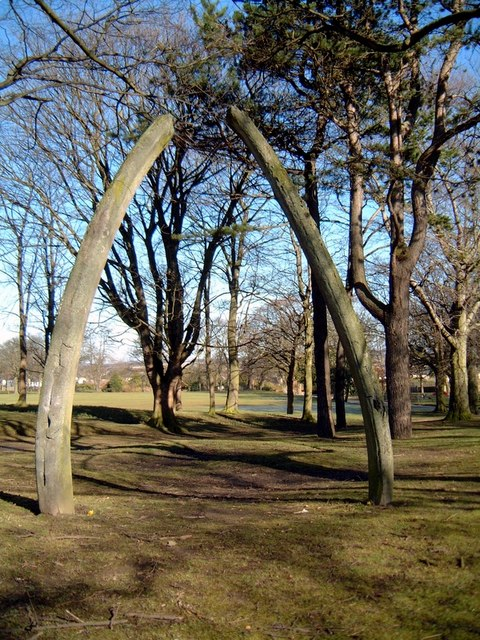
- Whalebones in Stewart Park
- Interactive map of Stewart Park
- Type: Public Park
- Location: Hilton, Aberdeen, Scotland
- Coordinates: 57°10′6″N 2°8′2″W
- Area: 5 acres (2.0 ha)
- Created: 1894
- Operator: Aberdeen City Council
- Status: Open all year

Stewart Park is located in Aberdeen, Scotland. It is a 5-acre (20,000 m^{2}) site owned by Aberdeen City Council. The land was originally bought by the council in 1891, when Woodside was incorporated into Aberdeen, using £500 bequeathed by Mrs. Jane Taylor, the widow of Mr. John Taylor, a merchant in the city "for a playground for the children of Woodside". The park was named after a former Lord Provost of the city, Sir David Stewart.

The park contains monumental whale jaw bones arches presented to the park in 1903 by the Captain of the Arctic whaler Benbow.

There is an intricate fountain designed as a replica of an Italian lavabo which was sculptured by Arthur Taylor of Jute Street, Aberdeen and erected in 1903 and was dedicated to Mrs. Jane Taylor whose bequest had funded the purchase of the land for the park.

There are nearby all weather tennis courts and bordered-off cricket and football pitches. The park is popular with local dog walkers and there is a playground for children.

Directly opposite the park are the "Woodies", an old granite quarry that is now a wooded area of land that is kept relatively wild.

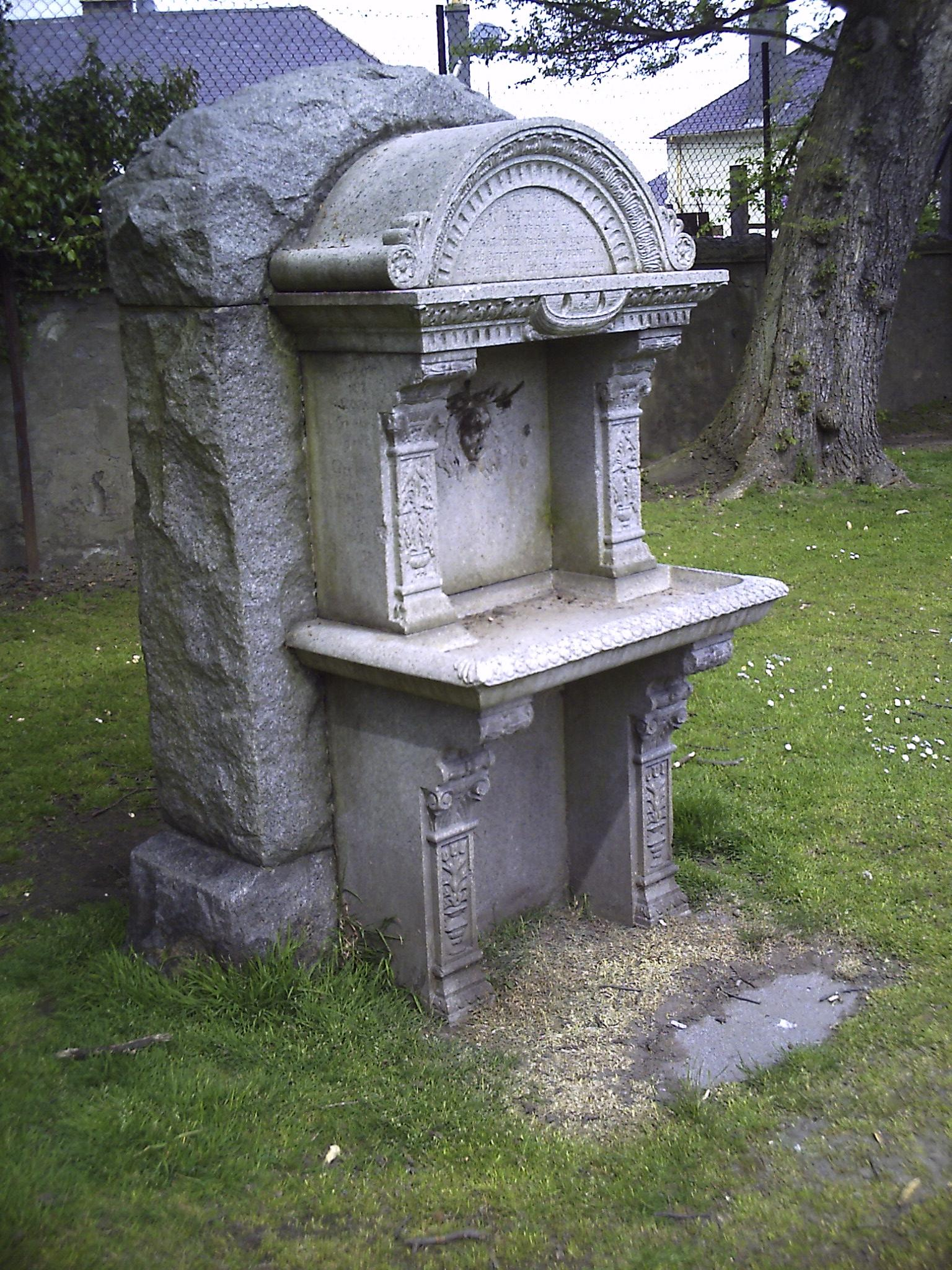
Stewart Park Fountain

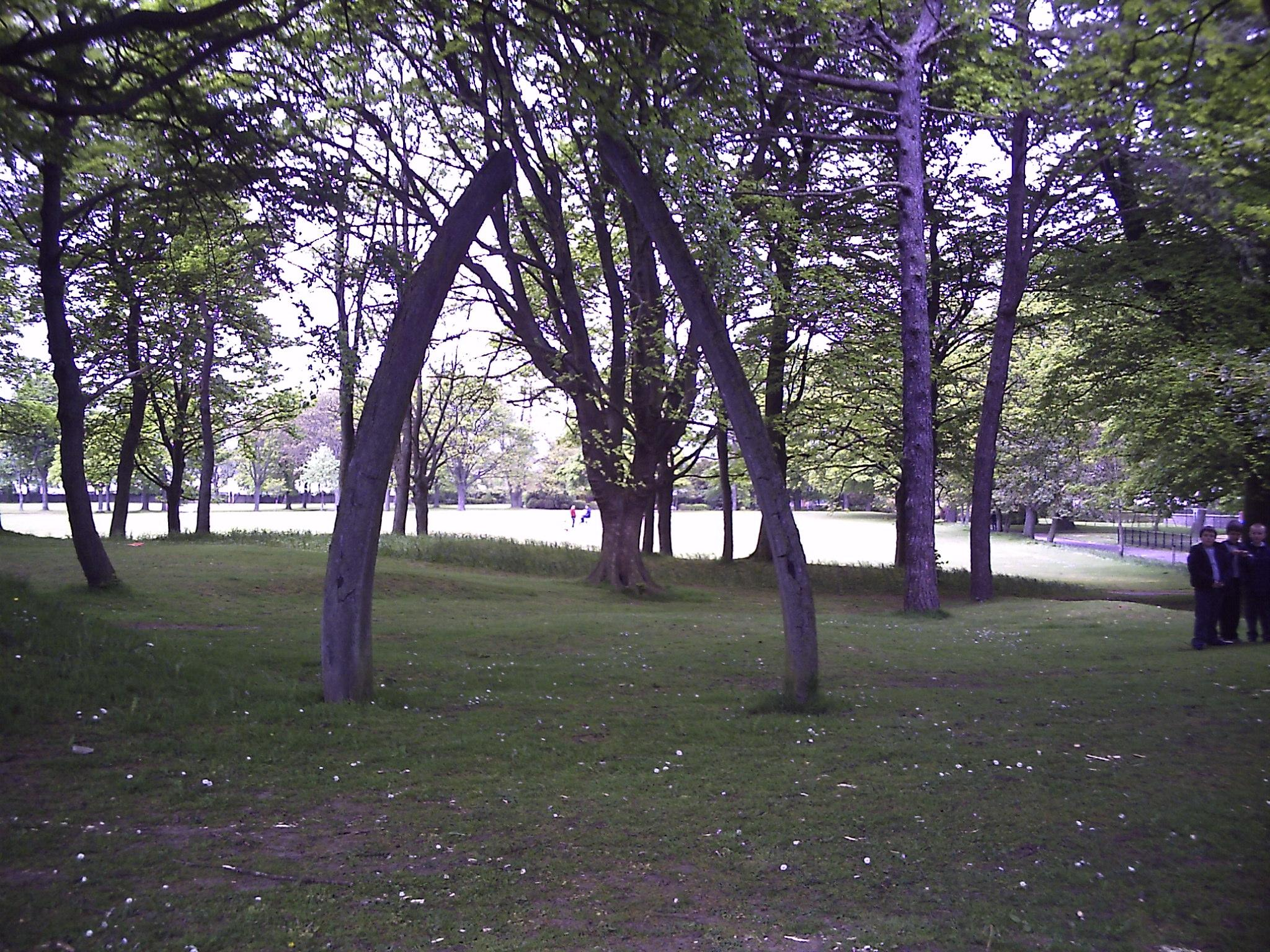
Stewart Park Whale Bones

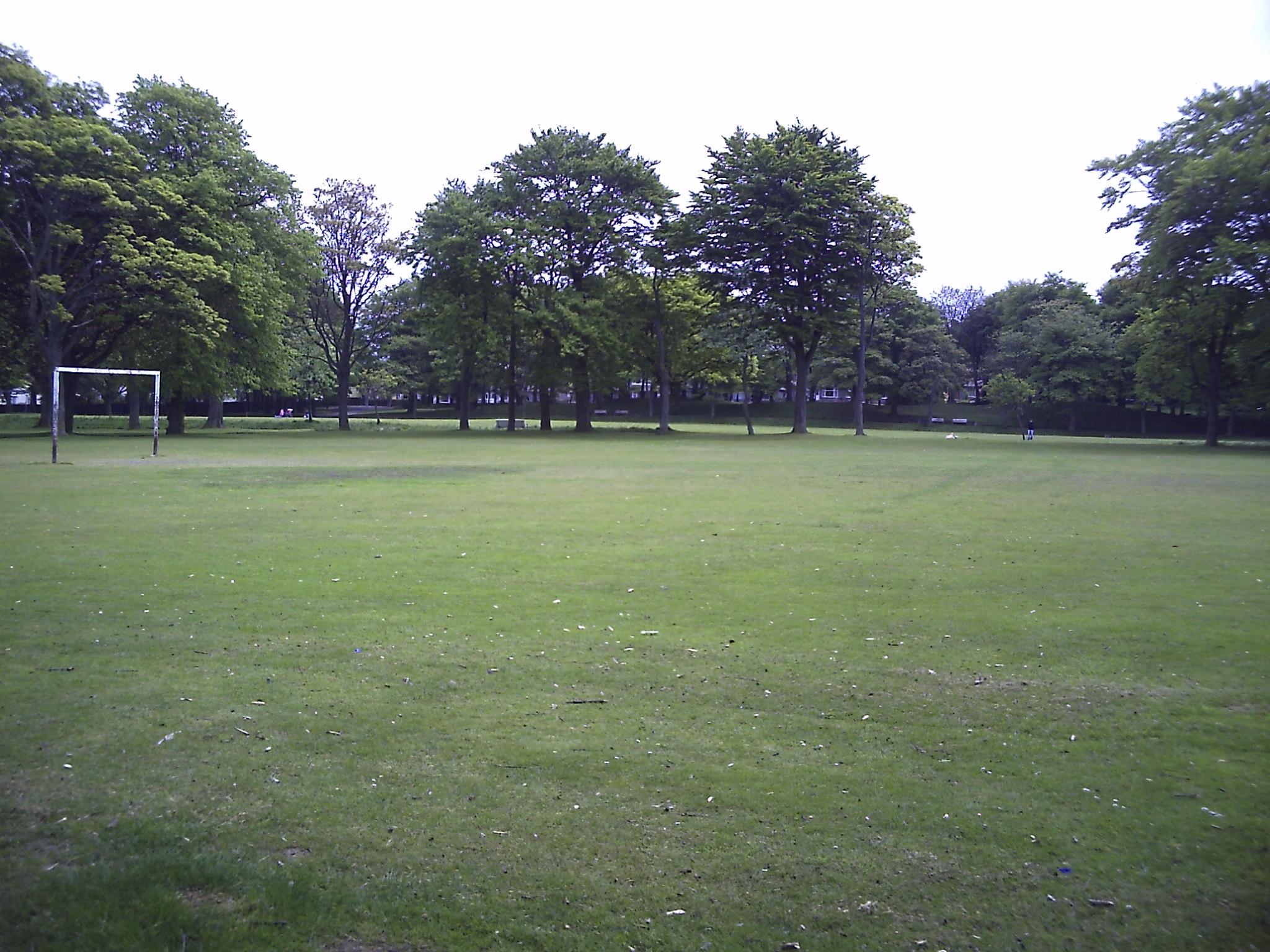
Stewart Park Playing Fields

== See also ==
- Green spaces and walkways in Aberdeen
