= Duthie Park =

Park in Aberdeen, Scotland

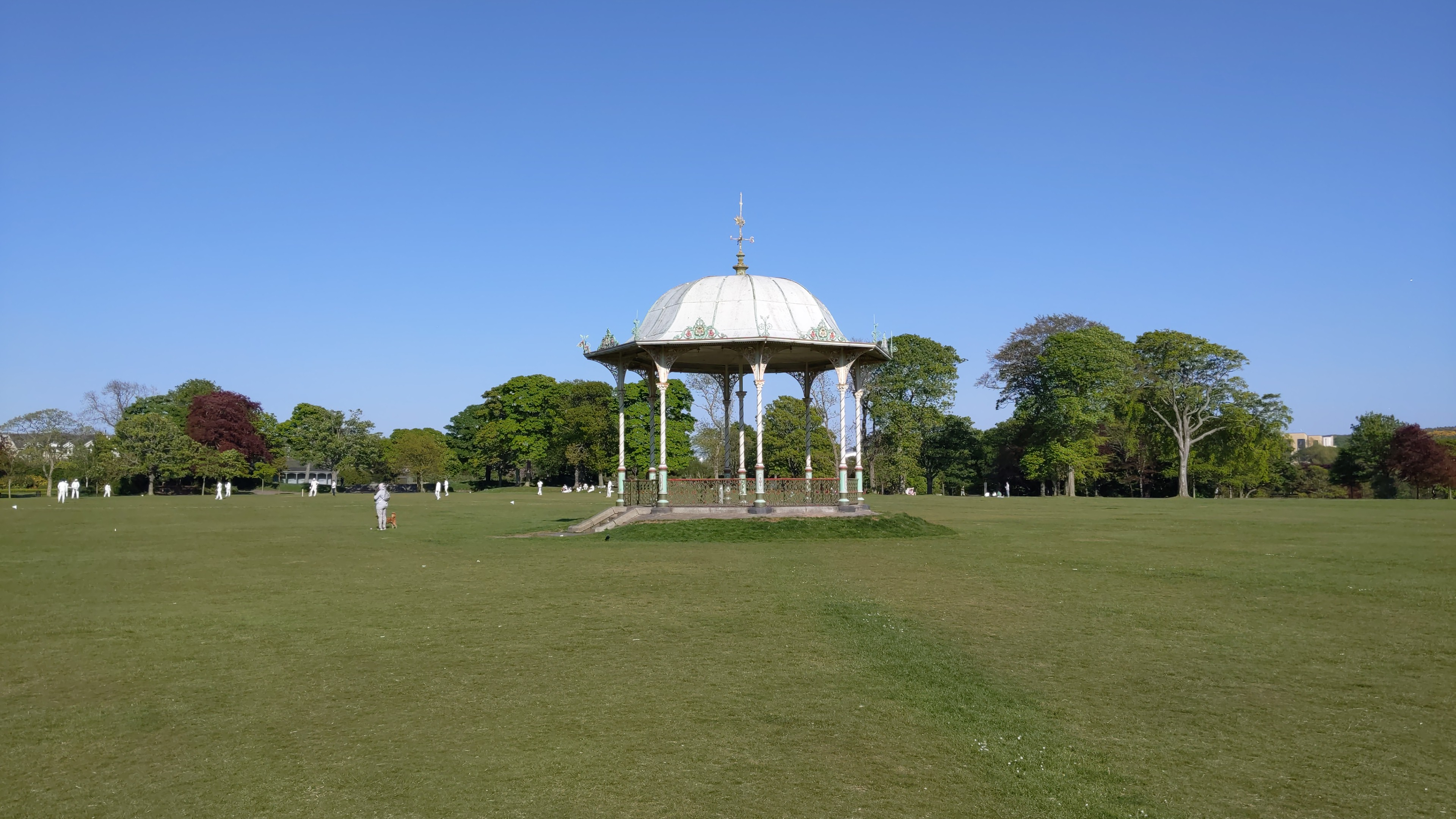
- The bandstand on the green, pictured in 2025
- Interactive map of Duthie Park
- Type: Public Park
- Location: Ferryhill, Aberdeen, Scotland
- Coordinates: 57°7′49″N 2°6′14″W
- Area: 44 acres (18 ha)
- Opened: 27 September 1883; 142 years ago
- Founder: Elizabeth Duthie
- Designer: William R McKelvie
- Operator: Aberdeen City Council
- Open: All year

Inventory of Gardens and Designed Landscapes in Scotland
- Official name: Duthie Park
- Designated: 31 March 2006
- Reference no.: GDL00166

Duthie Park is a public park in the Ferryhill area of Aberdeen, Scotland located near the River Dee. It comprises 44 acres (180,000 m^{2}) of land given to the council in 1881 by Elizabeth Crombie Duthie of Ruthrieston, in memory of her uncle and of her brother. She purchased the land for £30,000 from the estate of Arthurseat.

The former Deeside Railway ran along the northern edge of the park. The park is now the starting point for the Deeside Way, a long-distance path which uses the trackbed of the railway.

== History ==
Duthie Park was opened in 1881 after it was gifted to the city by Duthie in 1880 for the 'wellbeing and recreation of Aberdeen residents', a process which started on 4 August of that year. It was officially opened by Princess Beatrice of the United Kingdom on 27 September 1883.

During the 1970s Duthie Park played host to several television programmes. A round of It's A Knockout, featuring a team from Aberdeen against a team from Arbroath, was staged in Duthie Park on 10 May 1970 and transmitted on BBC1 on 13 May 1970. An episode of the children's programme Play School, transmitted Monday 3 May 1976, visited Duthie Park in 1976.

On 16 June 2002, Aberdeen's first LGBTQ Pride celebration, We're Not All Set in Granite, took place at Duthie Park.

In 2013 paddle boats were reintroduced to the park. Kayaks are regularly offered in the boating pond.

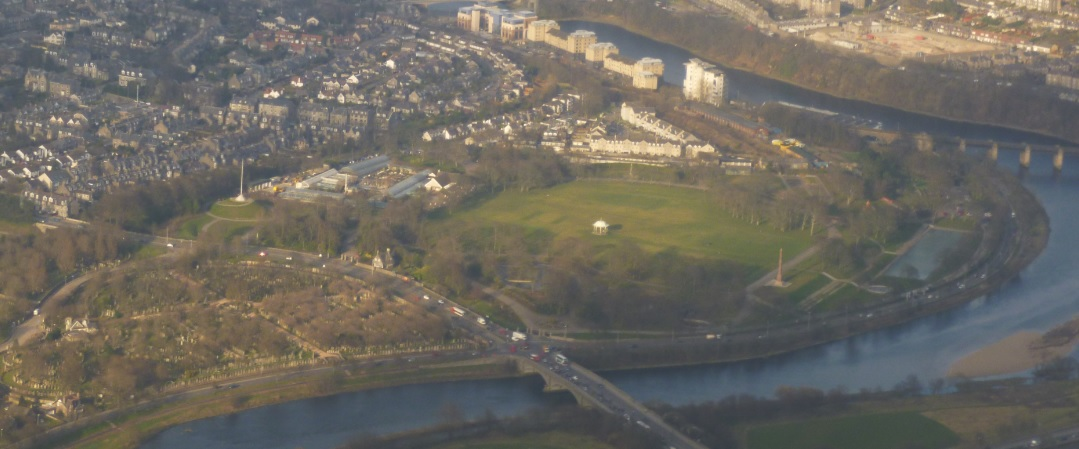
Duthie Park from the Air

The park has undergone a £5 million pound refurbishment with funding provided by the Heritage Lottery Fund and Aberdeen City Council. The original 1883 plans were consulted in order to restore some of the long-lost features. Work was completed in 2013 and the official reopening was on 30 June 2013. The refurbished park cafe was reopened in 2017 and is operated by the same company as the cafe at Hazlehead Park.

== Winter Gardens ==
The park is noted for the David Welch Winter Gardens with tropical and arid houses which contain the second largest collections of bromeliads and of giant cacti respectively in Great Britain (second to the Eden Project in Cornwall, England). Originally opened in 1899, the greenhouses had to be demolished and rebuilt after suffering storm damage in 1969 and the gardens subsequently reopened on 8 April 1970. The gardens contain a range of plants including tree ferns, Spanish moss, anthuria, and banana trees.

Within the gardens are railings salvaged from the south side of the major bridge in the middle of the city's Union Street. These feature unusual metal cats, derived from the city coat of arms, and were saved when the side of the bridge was developed for retail units in the mid-20th century.

The Japanese Garden is an outdoor area of the Winter Gardens arranged by Takashi Sawano, a landscape architect, to commemorate the dead of the atomic bombings of Hiroshima and Nagasaki. It was opened by Toshio Yamazaki, the ambassador of Japan to the United Kingdom, on 23 June 1987.

In 2002, the Winter Gardens were renamed the David Welch Winter Gardens after David Welch, Aberdeen's former director of parks.

The gardens closed to the public due to the COVID-19 pandemic and reopened in October 2021.

== Art in Duthie Park ==
An interactive musical art installation, called Hornchestra, was installed in 1975. It consisted of a set of horns mounted on a 39 ft. pole activated to play different notes by standing on underground foot pads and was donated by the Electrical Association for Women's Aberdeen branch. The installation was later referred to as the Honking Horns.

The J.J.R. Macleod memorial statue was unveiled on 12 October 2023. This celebrated the 100th anniversary of Macleod's joint award of the Nobel Prize for Medicine or Physiology in 1923, for his role in the discovery of Insulin. The statue was created by Ayrshire sculptor, John McKenna and sits within and expanded area of the park known as Macleod's corner.

A standing statue of the greek goddess Hygieia was completed by John Cassidy, a sculptor, in 1897. She stands atop a decorative Corinthian column with four recumbant lions at the base, on the eastern edge of the park. Hygieia, the goddess of health, is depicted holding a cup, from which a snake drinks.

The Duthie Fountain was presented in 1883 by Duthie. Made by A. MacDonald & Co. of pink Peterhead granite with four carved swans with folded wings supporting a polished basin.

== Images ==
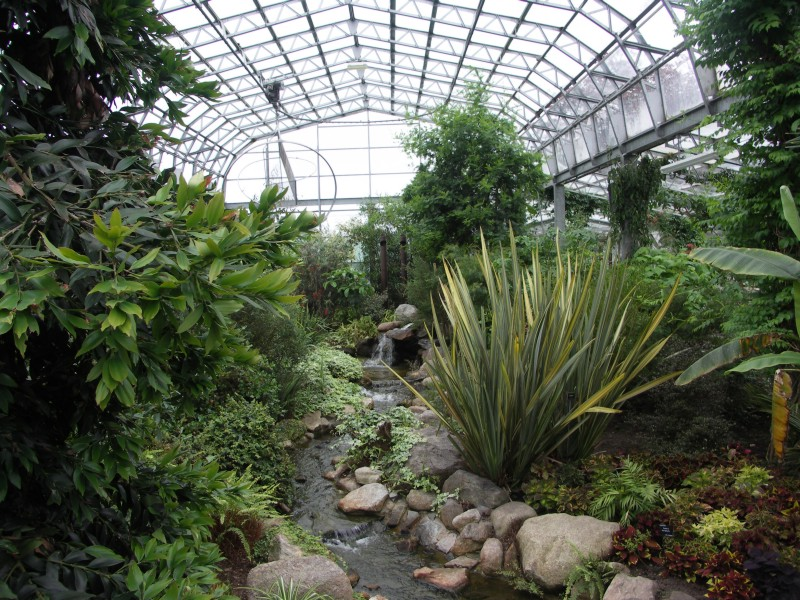
Temperate House in the Winter Gardens

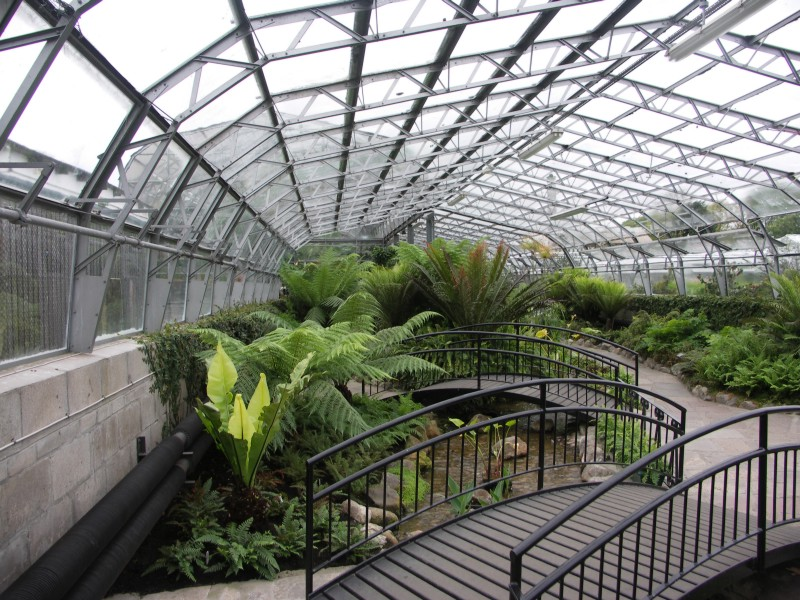
Ferns in the Winter Gardens

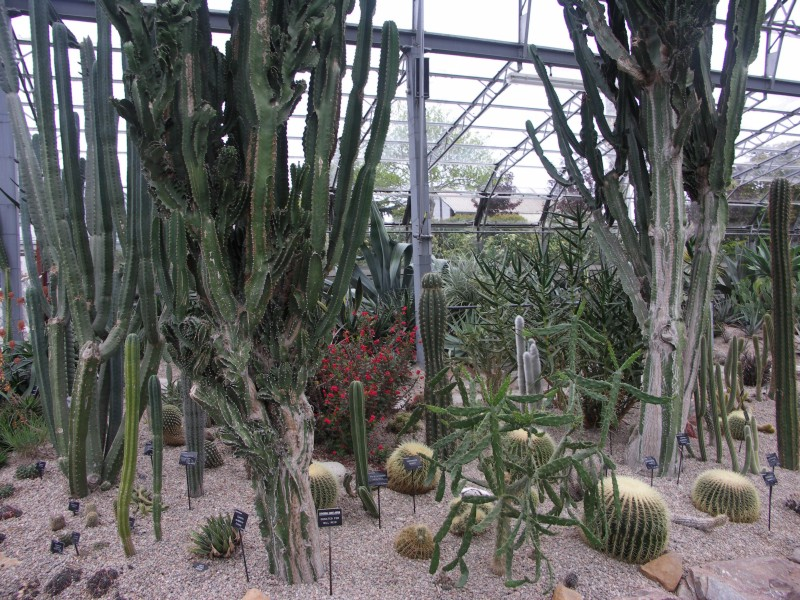
Cacti in the Arid house of the Winter Gardens

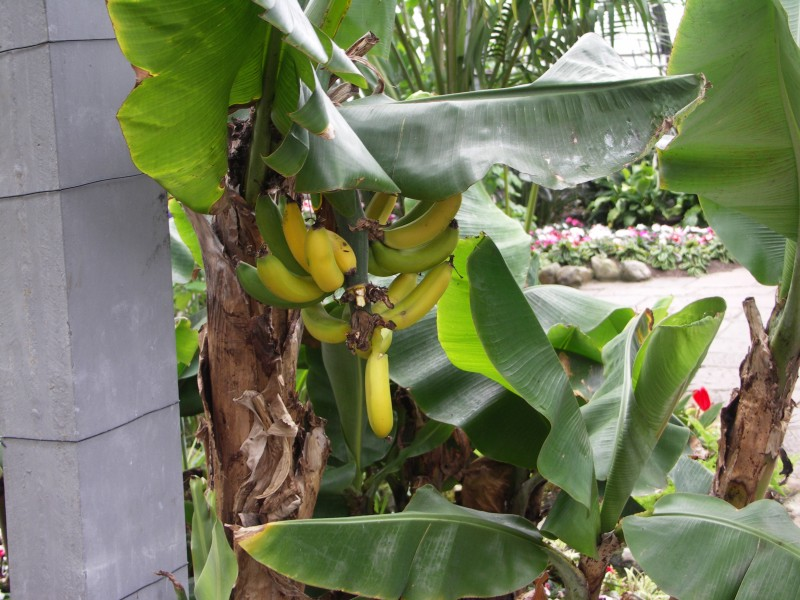
Bananas in the Winter Gardens

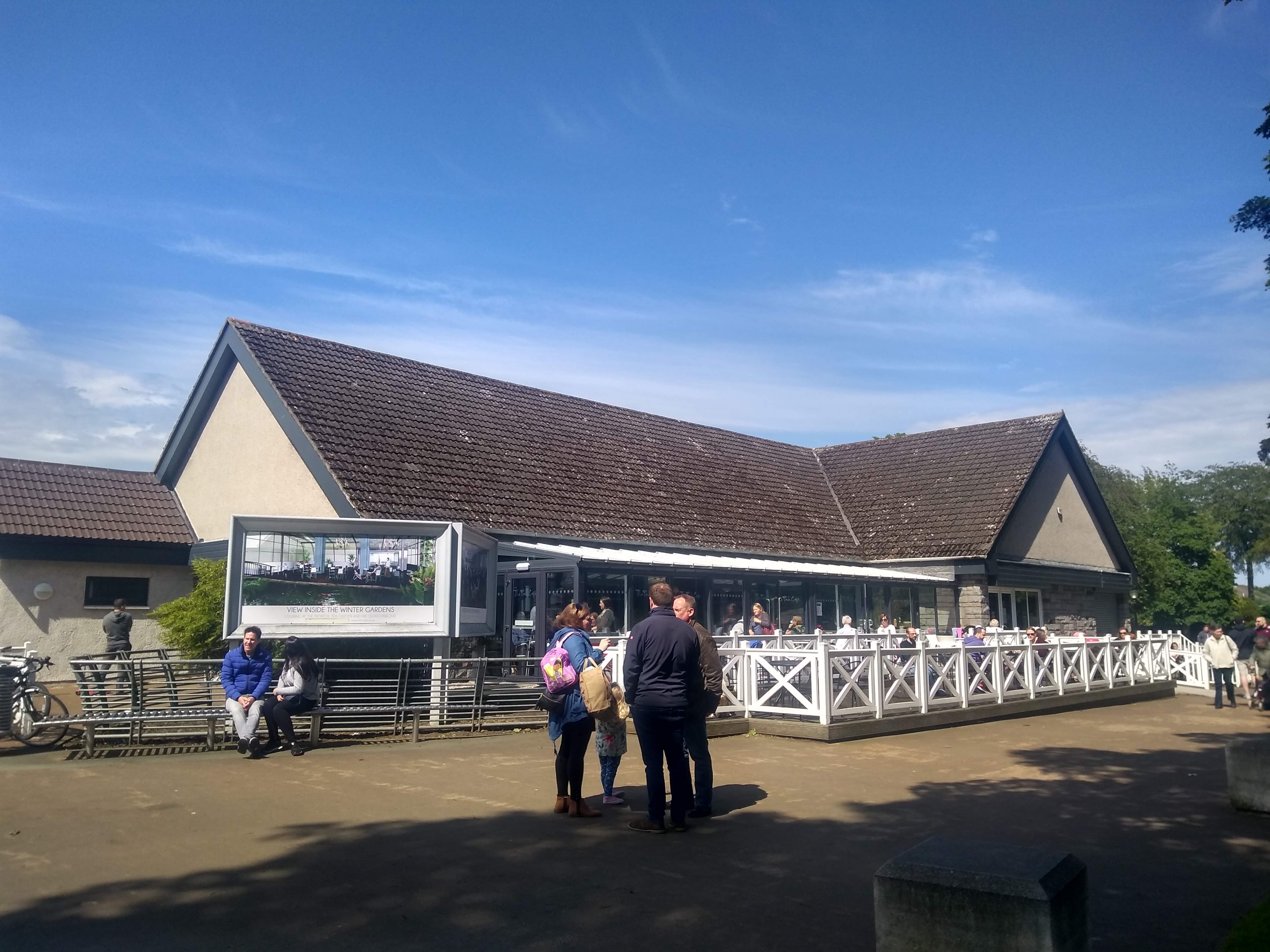
The park cafe

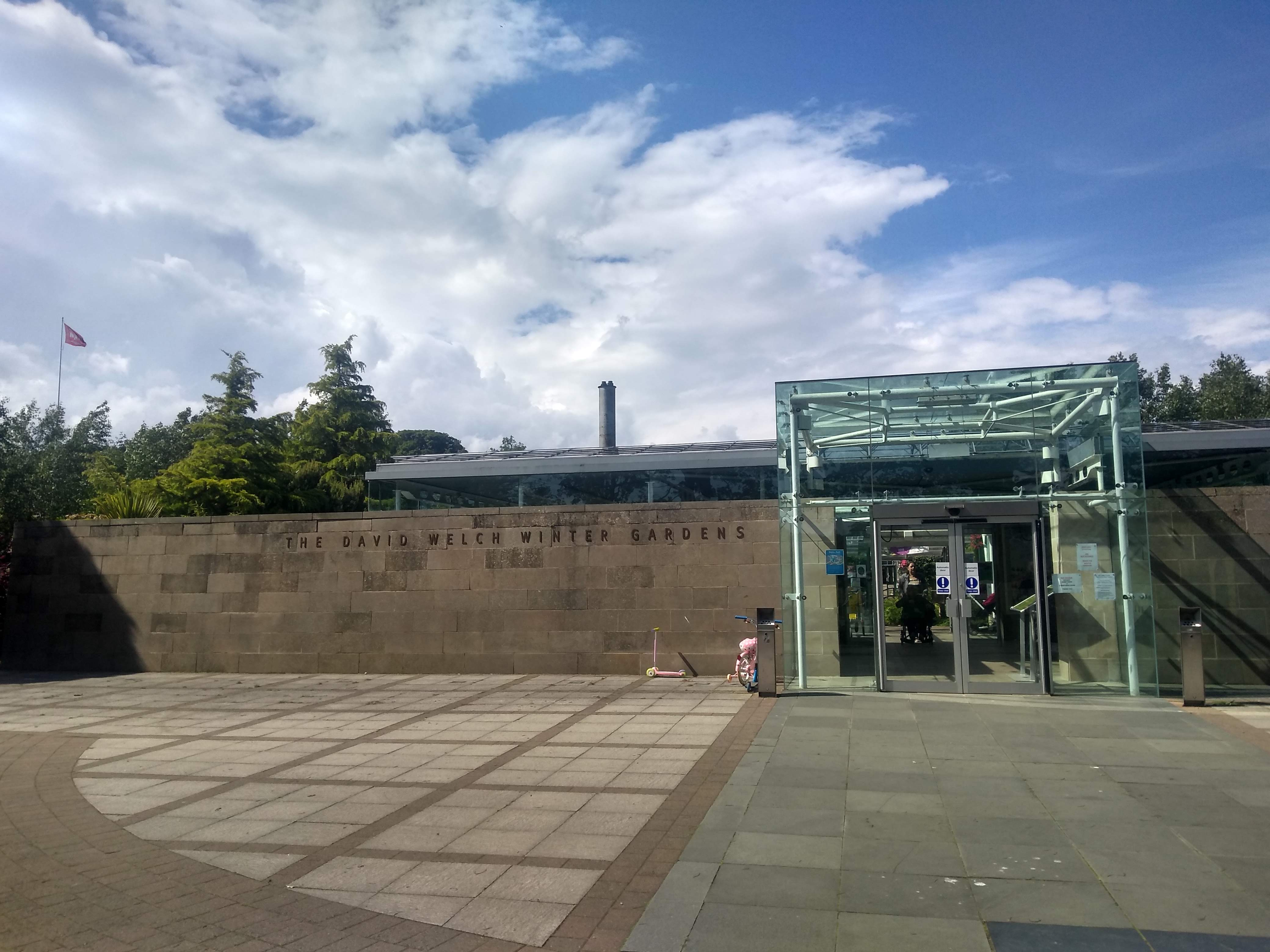
Entrance to the Winter Gardens

== See also ==
- Green spaces and walkways in Aberdeen
