= Hazlehead Park =

Public park in the Hazlehead area of Aberdeen, Scotland

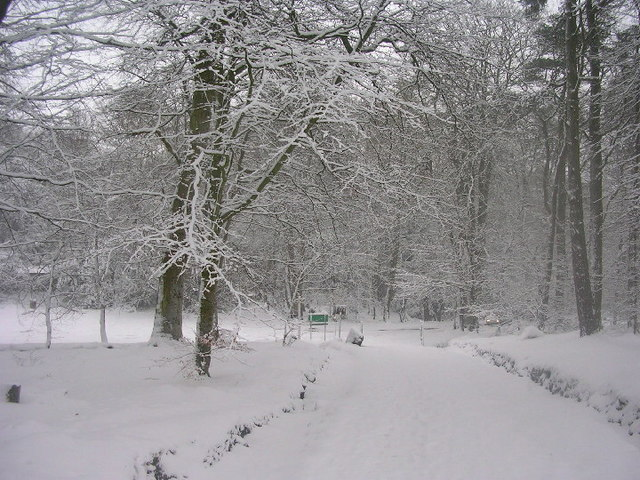
- Snow covering the woods of Hazlehead Park
- Interactive map of Hazlehead Park
- Type: Public Park
- Location: Aberdeen, Scotland
- Coordinates: 57°8′19″N 2°10′43″W
- Area: 180 hectares (440 acres)
- Created: (bought by the city for the public) 1920
- Operator: Aberdeen City Council
- Status: Open all year

Inventory of Gardens and Designed Landscapes in Scotland
- Official name: Piper Alpha Memorial Garden / North Sea Memorial Rose Garden
- Designated: 3 October 2023
- Reference no.: GDL00412

Hazlehead Park is a public park in the Hazlehead area of Aberdeen, Scotland. 180 hectares in size, it was opened to the public in 1920, having formerly been the estate of Hazlehead House, home of William Rose, shipbuilder. It is heavily wooded and contains many walking tracks.

There are football pitches, two golf courses, a pitch and putt course and a horse-riding school. The park has a significant collection of sculpture by a range of artists, including the memorial to those who died in the Piper Alpha disaster. It also has heritage items which have been rescued from various places within the city, and it features Scotland's oldest maze, first planted in 1935.

In 2022, Hazlehead Park was one of nine parks in Aberdeen and Aberdeenshire to be commended with a Green Flag award for sustainability and maintenance.

In September 2007, Hazlehead Park was host to the Northsound Radio concert, Free 2007. It took place on Sunday 2 September 2007, and claims to be the biggest free outdoor event in Scotland.

The park is home to a Parkrun.

== Golf ==
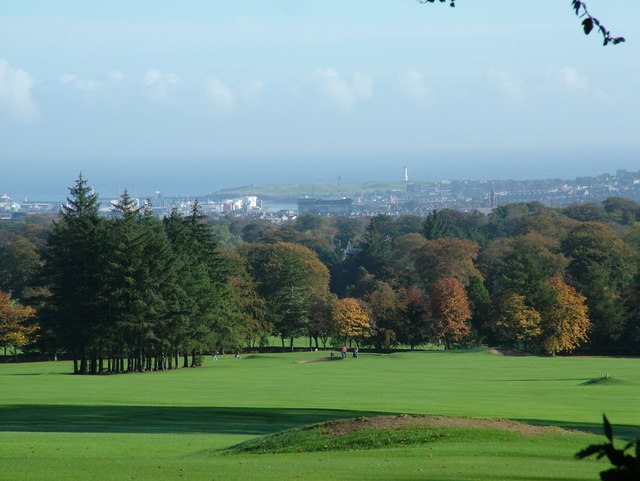
The park's golf course overlooking Aberdeen city.

The park has two 18 hole and a 9 hole golf course as well as a foot-golf area. The courses are public owned and there are no handicap or other restrictions for those who play on them.

The "Number 1 course" was designed by Alistair MacKenzie, who also designed the Augusta National.

== Cafe ==
The park has its own cafe which was refurbished and reopened in 2013. It is operated by the same company as the cafe at Duthie Park. The cafe was severely damaged in a fire in the evening of 11 December 2020, which was subsequently determined to have been started deliberately. It had been expected to be reopened by the end of 2021, but instead opened on 28 May 2022.

== Transport ==
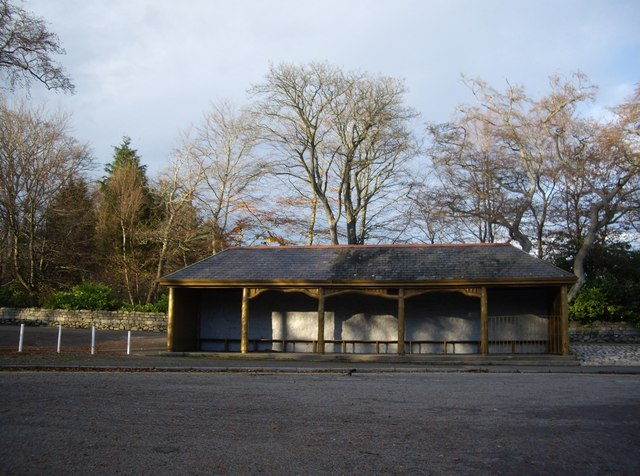
The shelter at the former tram and bus terminus

Hazlehead Park was the terminus of one of the Aberdeen Corporation Tramways routes. Service was withdrawn in 1958. Bus number 4 replaced the tram route and operated between the park and the beach. It was withdrawn in 1986.

== See also ==
- Green Spaces and Walkways in Aberdeen
