= Aberdeenshire (historic) =

Coordinates: 57°10′N 2°40′W

- Historic county
- Aberdeenshire shown within Scotland

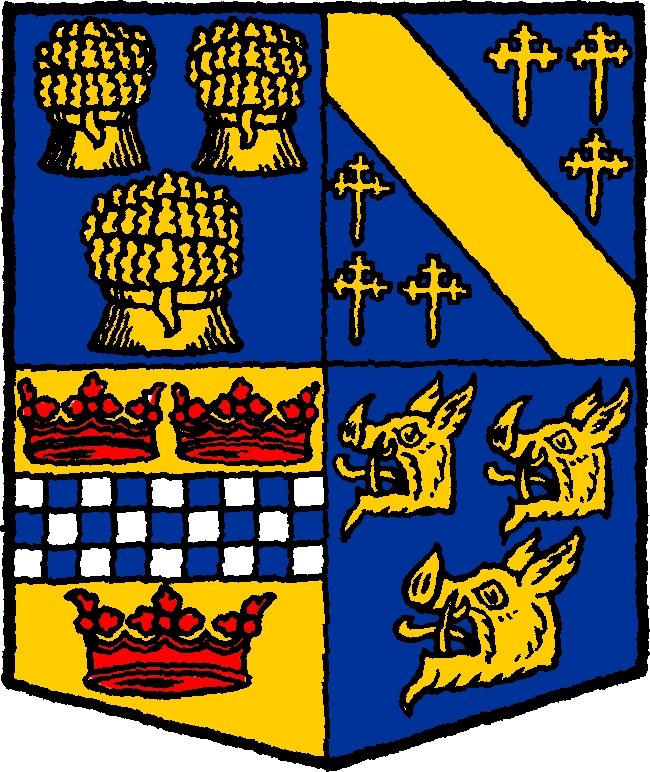
- Coat of arms Flag of Aberdeenshire, registered in 2023
- Interactive map of Aberdeenshire
- Country: Scotland
- County town: Aberdeen

Area
  - Total: 1,950 sq mi (5,050 km^{2})
- Ranked 6th of 34
- Chapman code: ABD
- Website: www.lordlieutenant-aberdeenshire.co.uk

Aberdeenshire or the County of Aberdeen (Scots: Coontie o Aiberdeen, Scottish Gaelic: Siorrachd Obar Dheathain) is a historic county in Scotland. The county gives its name to the modern Aberdeenshire council area, which covers a larger area than the historic county. The historic county ceased to be used for local government purposes in 1975, but its boundaries are still used for certain functions, being a registration county. The area of the historic county excluding the Aberdeen City council area is also a lieutenancy area.

The area is generally hilly. The south-west of the county includes part of the Grampian Mountains. The historic county borders Kincardineshire, Angus and Perthshire to the south, Inverness-shire and Banffshire to the west, and the North Sea to the north and east.

== History ==
=== Early history ===
The area which would become Aberdeenshire was anciently occupied by the Picts, whom Ptolemy, writing c. 150 AD, called Taexali. There is some evidence of Roman activity in the area, notably with a camp at Normandykes near Peterculter. Weems or earth-houses were a common type of ancient dwelling in the west. Relics of crannogs or lake-dwellings exist at Loch Kinord and Bishops' Loch (historically called Loch Goul) in the parish of New Machar and elsewhere. Duns or forts occur on hills at Dunecht, where the dun encloses an area of two acres (8,000 m^{2}), Barra near Oldmeldrum, Tap o' Noth, Dunnideer near Insch and other places. There are numerous monoliths, standing stones and stone circles in the area, along with many examples of the sculptured stones of the early Christian epoch.

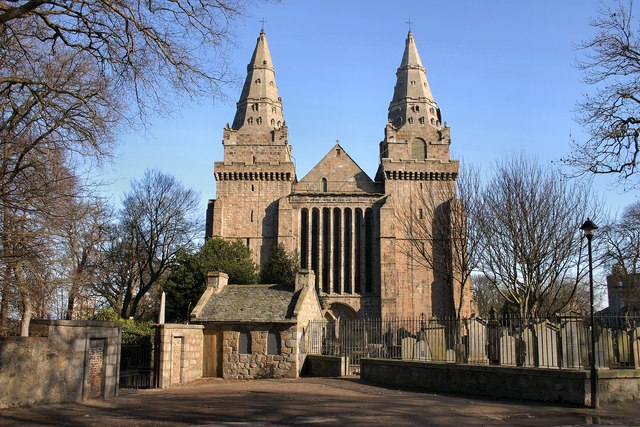
St Machar's Cathedral, Aberdeen

Missionaries aiming to convert the Picts to Christianity began with Teman in the 5th century, and continued with Columba, Machar (after whom St Machar's Cathedral in Aberdeen is named), and Drostan, who founded a monastery at Old Deer. The Vikings and Danes periodically raided the coast. Macbeth, King of Scotland, was killed at the Battle of Lumphanan in 1057.

=== 12th to 15th centuries ===
Aberdeen itself was made a royal burgh by David I (reigned 1124–1153). Its earliest surviving charter dates from 1179, by which date its burgesses had already combined with those of Banff, Elgin, Inverness and other trans-Grampian communities to form a hanse (trading league). The Diocese of Aberdeen was in existence by the 1150s.

Like much of Scotland, the influence of clans led by powerful families was significant. Many such clans in Aberdeenshire came to prominence in the 12th and 13th centuries, including the clans of Mar, Leslie, Bissett, Comyn and Cheyne.

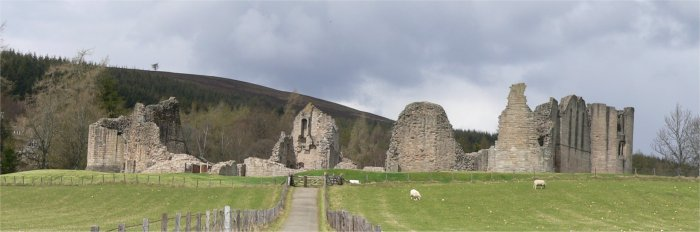
Kildrummy Castle

During the English invasion of 1296, the English army under Edward I took control of Aberdeen Castle. The following year, William Wallace surprised the English garrison in Aberdeen, but failed to capture the castle. In 1303 Edward again visited the county, halting at Kildrummy Castle, then in the possession of Robert the Bruce, who shortly afterwards became the acknowledged leader of the Scots and made Aberdeen his headquarters for several months. In 1308, he defeated John Comyn, Earl of Buchan, an opponent of his claim to the Scottish throne, at Inverurie.

For a hundred years after Bruce's death in 1329, there was intermittent conflict in the shire. The English burned Aberdeen itself in 1336. The dispossession and re-settlement of the districts of Buchan and Strathbogie caused numerous disputes. Moreover, the crown had embroiled itself with some of the Highland chieftains, whose independence it sought to abolish. This policy culminated in the invasion of Aberdeenshire by Donald of Islay, Lord of the Isles, who was defeated at the Battle of Harlaw in 1411 by the Scottish army under Alexander Stewart, Earl of Mar.

In the 15th century two further leading county families emerged: Sir Alexander Forbes becoming Lord Forbes about 1442, and Sir Alexander Seton, Lord Gordon in 1437 and Earl of Huntly in 1445. Bitter feuds raged between these families for a long period. The Gordons reached the height of their power in the first half of the 16th century, when their domains, already vast, were enhanced by the acquisition, through marriage, of the Earldom of Sutherland in 1514.

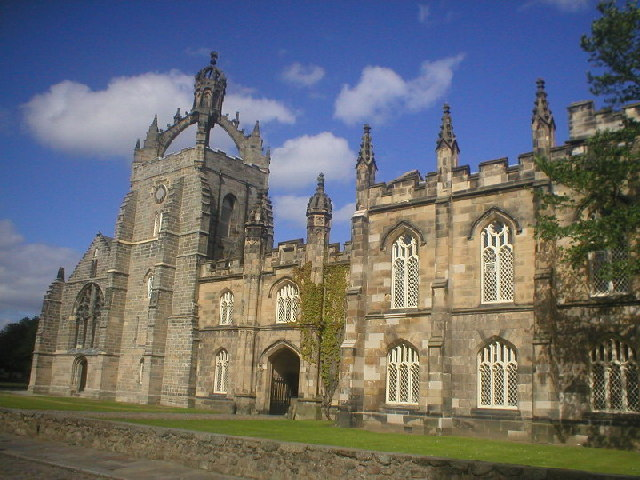
King's College, Aberdeen

King's College, Aberdeen was founded in 1495, followed by Marischal College in 1593; the two colleges subsequently merged to become the University of Aberdeen in 1860. In 1592, the shortlived Fraserburgh University was founded, thus for a short time, Aberdeenshire hosted three universities.

=== 16th to 19th centuries ===
The Reformation of the 16th century was slow to reach Aberdeenshire. Churches were still being built and decorated in the old Catholic style in Aberdeenshire for some years after southern Scotland had started moving away from such styles. Opposition to the changes to Protestant forms of worship and church leadership saw rioting in Aberdeen, with St Machar's Cathedral being damaged. George Gordon, 4th Earl of Huntly offered some resistance on behalf of the Catholics to the influence of James Stewart, 1st Earl of Moray, who was regent during the reign of James VI, but was defeated and killed at the Battle of Corrichie on the Hill of Fare in 1562.

As years passed it became apparent that Presbyterianism gained less support in Aberdeenshire than Episcopacy, of which system Aberdeenshire remained for generations the stronghold in Scotland.

Another crisis in ecclesiastical affairs arose in 1638, when the authorities ordered subscription to the National Covenant. The people of Aberdeenshire responded so grudgingly to this demand that James Graham, 1st Marquess of Montrose, visited the shire in the following year to enforce acceptance. The Cavaliers, not being disposed to yield, dispersed an armed gathering of Covenanters in the affair called the Trot of Turriff in 1639, one of the first skirmishes in the Civil Wars.

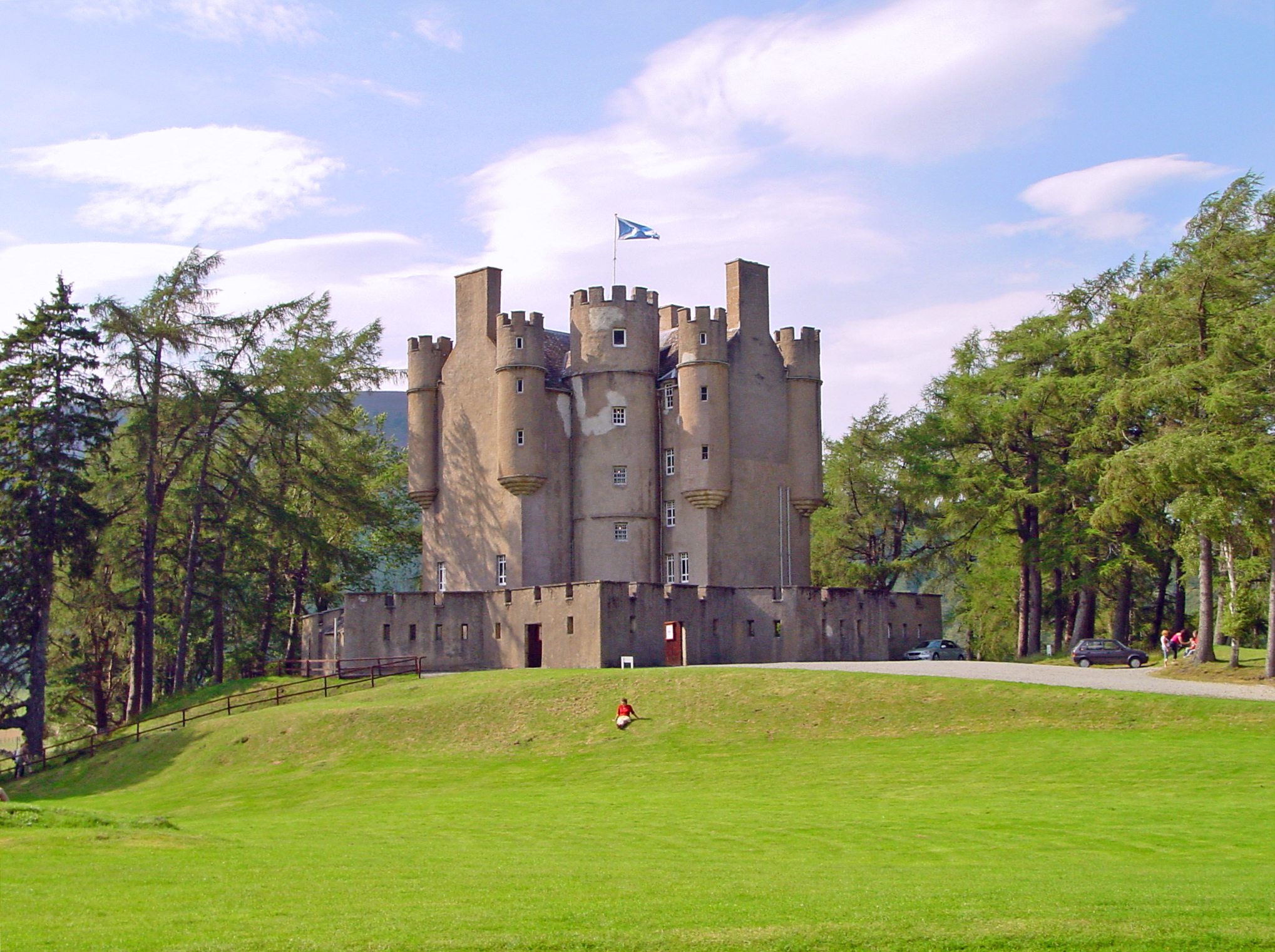
Braemar Castle

On 6 September 1715 John Erskine, Earl of Mar initiated the Jacobite rising of 1715 at Braemar in support of the claim of James Francis Edward Stuart to the throne. Stuart arrived in Scotland from his exile in France, landing at Peterhead on 22 December 1715. The rising was unsuccessful and by February 1716 Stuart was back in France. The collapse of the 1715 rising ruined many of the lairds. In the subsequent Jacobite rising of 1745 there was much less support for the cause in the county, although the insurgents held Aberdeen for five months until February 1746.

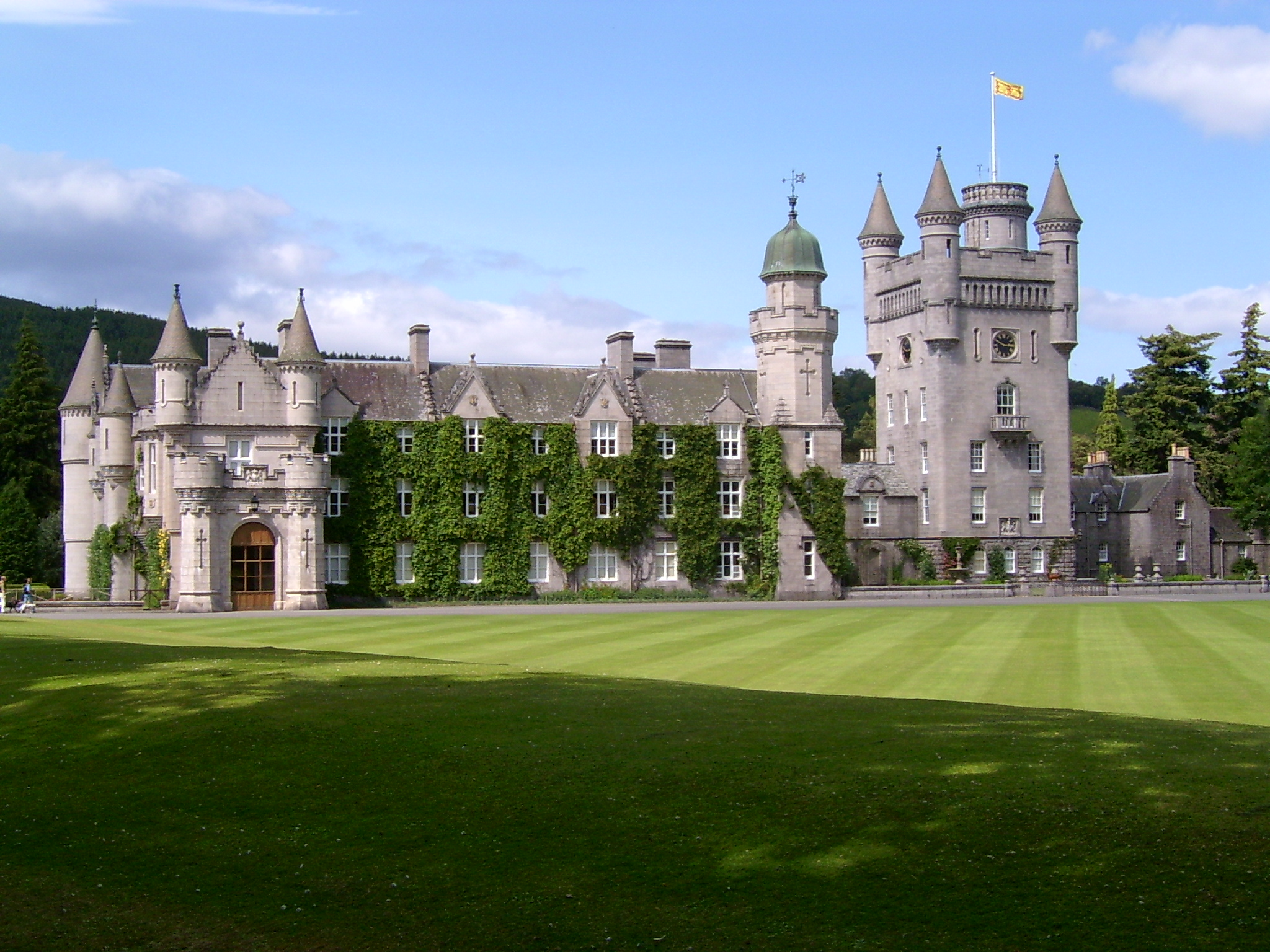
Balmoral Castle

In 1852 Prince Albert, husband of Queen Victoria, bought the Balmoral Castle estate in the valley of the River Dee and subsequently rebuilt the castle there.

=== Administrative history ===
Aberdeenshire's origins as a shire (the area administered by a sheriff) are obscure. There is some evidence that it was a shire from the time of David I (reigned 1124–1153), but the earliest documented Sheriff of Aberdeen was in the 13th century. The sheriff's jurisdiction covered the older provinces of Buchan, Formartine, Garioch, and Marr (or Mar).

Over time, Scotland's shires became more significant than the old provinces, with more administrative functions being given to the sheriffs. In 1667 Commissioners of Supply were established for each shire, which would serve as the main administrative body for the area until the creation of county councils in 1890. Following the Acts of Union in 1707, the English term 'county' came to be used interchangeably with the older term 'shire'.

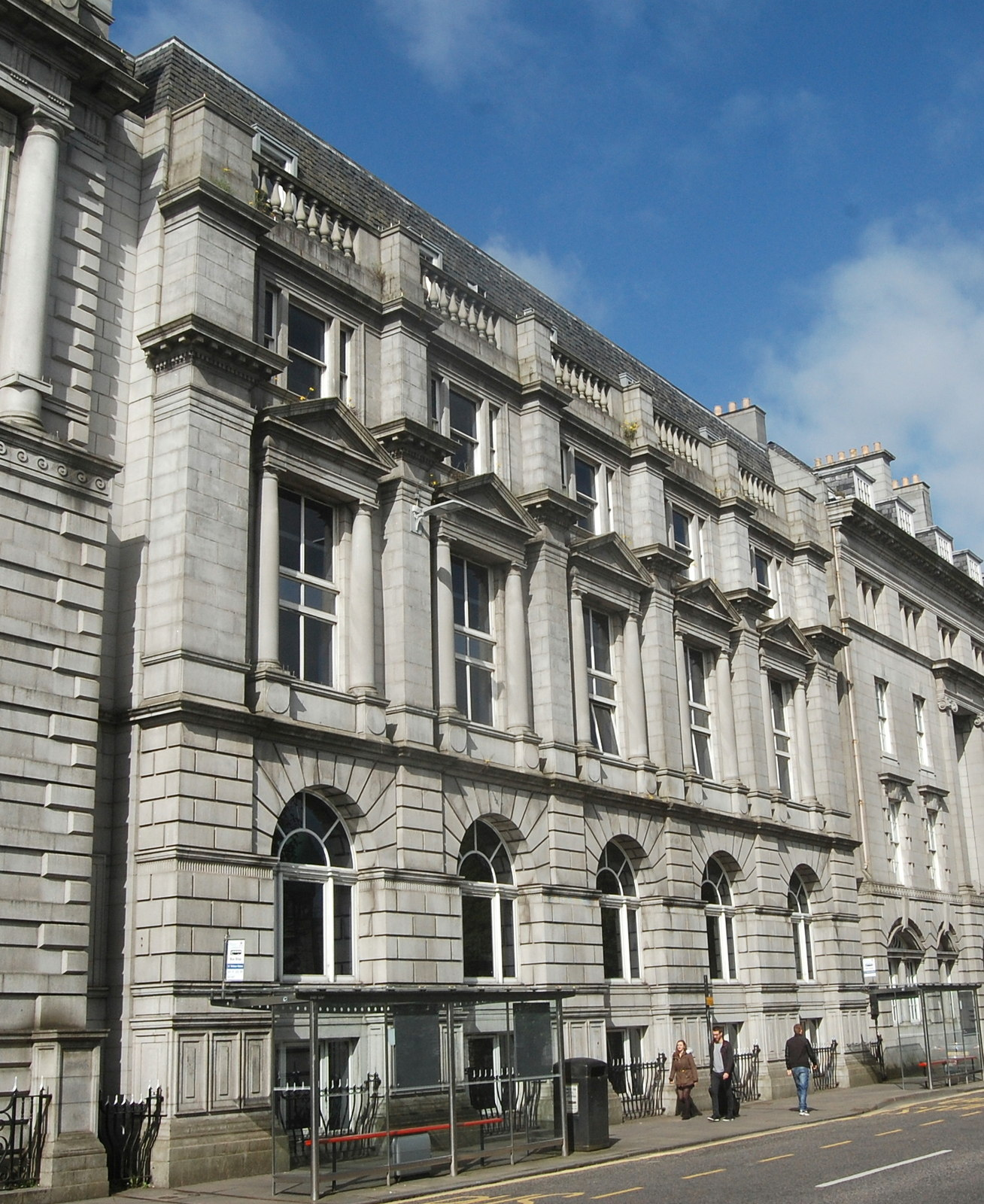
County Buildings in Union Terrace, the former headquarters of Aberdeenshire County Council

Elected county councils were established in 1890 under the Local Government (Scotland) Act 1889, taking most of the functions of the commissioners (which were eventually abolished in 1930). The burgh of Aberdeen was deemed capable of providing its own county-level local government functions, and so it was excluded from the administrative area of the county council, although the county council still chose to base itself in the city. The first meeting of Aberdeenshire County Council was held on 22 May 1890 at Aberdeen Town House, which as well as being the headquarters of Aberdeen Corporation also served as the county's main courthouse and meeting place of the commissioners of supply. Alexander Morison Gordon of Newton House in the parish of Culsalmond was the first convener of the council.

The 1889 Act also led to a review of boundaries, with exclaves being transferred to a county they actually bordered, and parish and county boundaries being adjusted to eliminate cases where parishes straddled county boundaries. There were several such changes affecting the boundaries of Aberdeenshire. The city of Aberdeen, already independent for local government purposes, was subsequently also removed from Aberdeenshire for lieutenancy and other purposes in 1899, when the city was made a county of itself.

Shortly after its creation, the county council built itself County Buildings in Union Terrace, Aberdeen, to serve as its headquarters, which was completed in 1896.

In 1975 the Local Government (Scotland) Act 1973 reorganised local government in Scotland into a two-tier system of regions and districts. The administrative counties of Aberdeenshire, the City of Aberdeen, Banffshire, Kincardineshire and most of Moray were merged to form Grampian Region, with the pre-1975 area of Aberdeenshire being divided between the districts of City of Aberdeen, Banff and Buchan, Gordon and Kincardine and Deeside.

In 1996 the Scottish local government system was reorganised again, this time into single-tier council areas. One of the council areas is called Aberdeenshire, covering the combined area of the pre-1996 districts of Banff and Buchan, Gordon, and Kincardine and Deeside. The council area therefore has significantly different boundaries to the pre-1975 county, also including most of the historic county of Kincardineshire and eastern parts of Banffshire (including its county town of Banff), but excluding Aberdeen City. The boundaries of the historic county (as it was prior to the removal of Aberdeen in 1899) are still used for some limited official purposes connected with land registration, being a registration county. The Aberdeenshire lieutenancy area covers the area of the pre-1975 county excluding the parts within the modern Aberdeen City council area.

== Geography ==
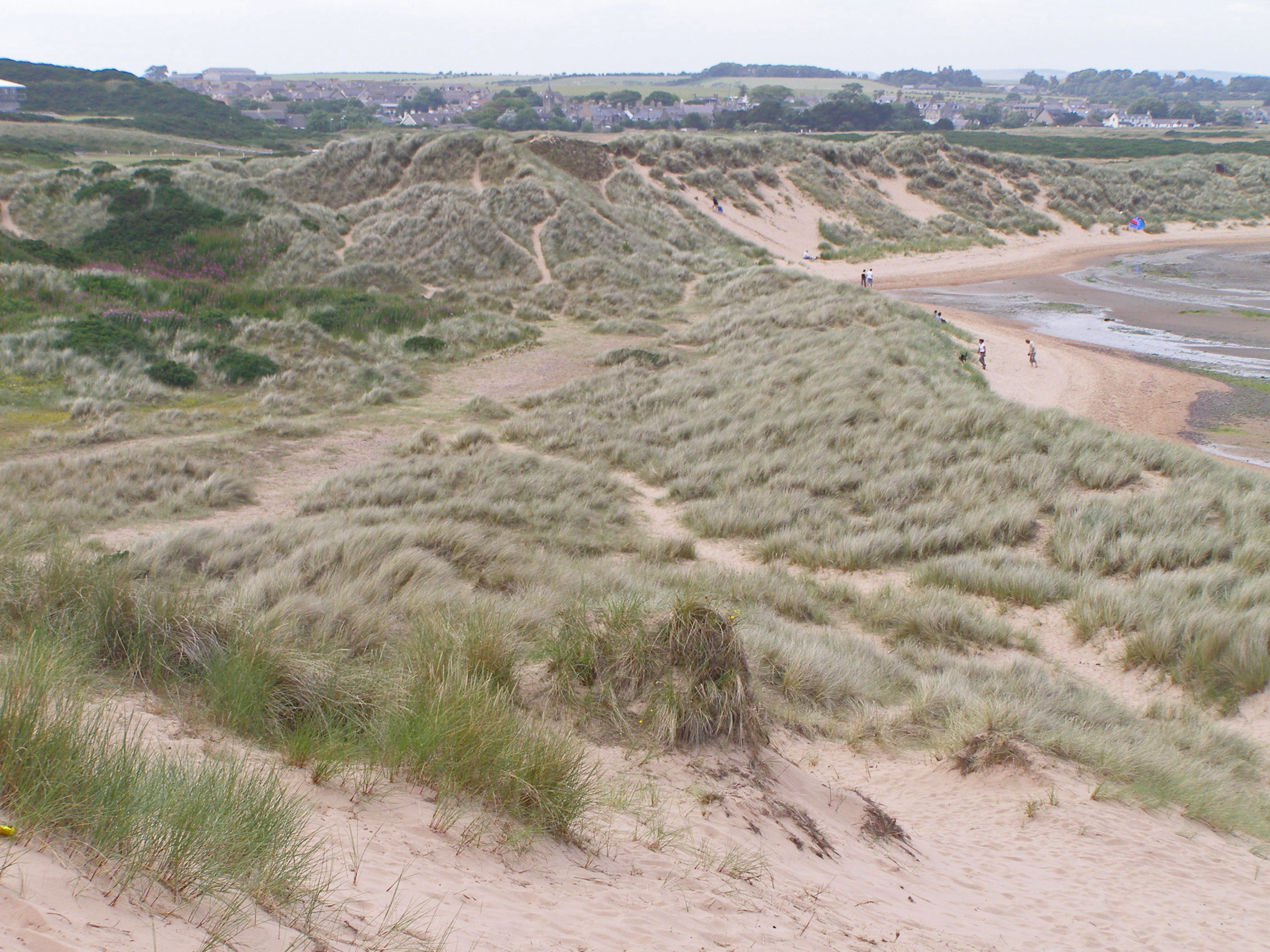
Sand-dunes on the coast near Newburgh

The historic Aberdeenshire is traditionally divided into five districts:

- Mar, mostly between the Dee and Don, which nearly covers the southern half of the county and contains Aberdeen. It is mountainous, especially Braemar, which contains the greatest mass of elevated land in the British Isles. The Dee valley has sandy soil, the Don valley loamy.
- Formartine, between the lower Don and Ythan, has a sandy coast, which is succeeded inland by a clayey, fertile, tilled tract, and then by low hills, moors, mosses and tilled land.
- Buchan lies north of the Ythan, and comprising the north-east of the county, is next in size to Mar, parts of the coast being bold and rocky, the interior bare, low, flat, undulating and in places peaty. On the coast, six miles (10 km) south of Peterhead, are the Bullers of Buchan – a basin in which the sea, entering by a natural arch, boils up violently in stormy weather. Keith Inch is the most easterly point of mainland Scotland.
- Garioch, in the centre of the shire, comprises an undulating, loamy, fertile valley, formerly called the granary of Aberdeen.
- Strathbogie, occupying a considerable area south of the Deveron, mostly consists of hills, moors and mosses.

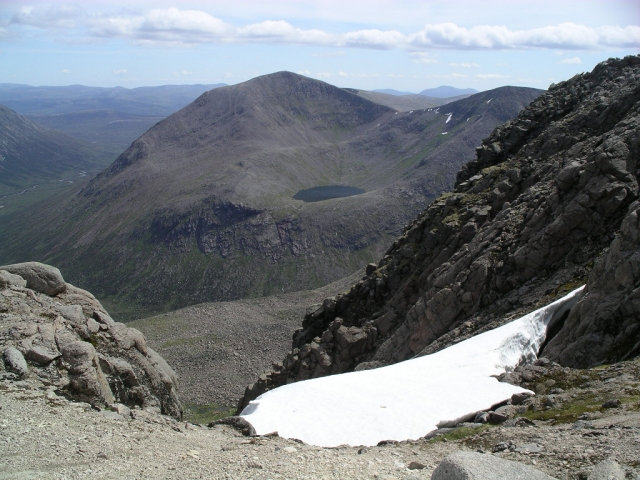
Cairn Toul in the Cairngorms

The interior mountains of the Cairngorms provide the most striking of the physical features of the county. Munros (peaks over 3000 feet) in the county include:

- Ben Macdhui, 1,309 m (4,295 ft), the second highest mountain in the United Kingdom (on the border with Banffshire)
- Braeriach 1,295 m (4,249 ft)
- Cairn Toul, 1,293 m (4,242 ft)
- Beinn a' Bhùird, 1,196 m (3,924 ft)
- Ben Avon, 1,171 m (3,842 ft)
- "Dark" Lochnagar, 1,154 m (3,786 ft)
- Cairn Eas, 1,084 m (3,556 ft),
- Sgarsoch, 1,037 m (3,402 ft)
- Culardoch 900 m (3,000 ft)

Farther north rise the Buck of Cabrach, 722 m (2,369 ft) on the Banffshire border, Tap o' Noth, 558 m (1,831 ft), Bennachie, 518 m (1,699 ft), which from its central position is a landmark visible from many different parts of the county, and which is celebrated in John Imlah's song, O gin I war faur the Gadie rins, and Foudland, 466 m (1,529 ft).

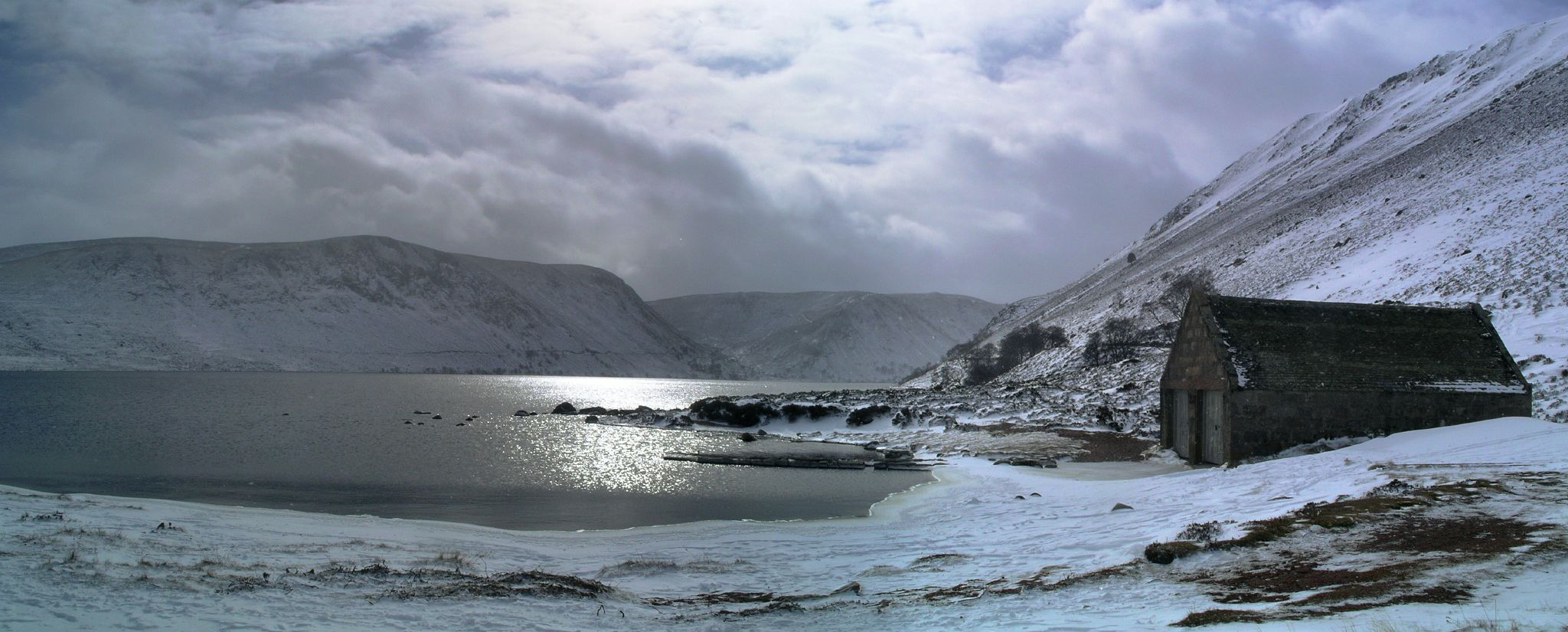
Loch Muick in winter

The chief rivers are the Dee, 90 miles (140 km) long; the Don, 82 miles (132 km); the Ythan, 37 miles (60 km), with mussel-beds at its mouth; the Ugie, 20 miles (32 km), and the Deveron, 62 miles (100 km), partly on the boundary of Banffshire. A pearl in the Scottish crown is said to be from the Ythan.

Loch Muick, the largest of the few lakes in the county, 399 m (1,309 ft) above the sea, 2 1/2 miles (4.0 km) long and 1/3 to 1/2 mile (540 to 800 m) broad, lies some 8 1/2 miles (13.7 km) southwest of Ballater. Loch Strathbeg, 6 miles (9.7 km) southeast of Fraserburgh, is only separated from the sea by a narrow strip of land. There are noted chalybeate springs at Peterhead, Fraserburgh, and Pannanich near Ballater. Other lochs of note are Loch Kinord, Loch Davan, Dubh Loch, Lochnagar, Loch Callater, Loch nan Eun and the Loch of Skene.

=== Geology ===
The greater part of the county is composed of crystalline schists belonging to the metamorphic rocks of the Eastern Highlands.

In the upper parts of the valleys of the Dee and the Don they form well-marked groups, of which the most characteristic are:

1. the black schists and phyllites, with flints, and a thin band of tremolite limestone,
2. the main or Blair Atholl limestone,
3. the quartzite.

These divisions are folded on highly inclined or vertical axes trending north-east and south-west, and hence the same zones are repeated over a considerable area. The quartzite is generally regarded as the highest member of the series. Excellent sections showing the component strata occur in Glen Clunie and its tributary valleys above Braemar. Eastwards down the Dee and the Don and northwards across the plain of Buchan towards Rattray Head and Fraserburgh there is a development of biotite gneiss, partly of sedimentary and perhaps partly of igneous origin. A belt of slate which has been quarried for roofing purposes runs along the west border of the county from Turriff by Auchterless and the Foudland Hills towards the Tap o' Noth near Gartly. The metamorphic rocks have been invaded by igneous materials, some before, and by far the larger series after the folding of the strata.

The basic types of the former are represented by the sills of epidiorite and hornblende gneiss in Glen Muick and Glen Callater, which have been permeated by granite and pegmatite in veins and lenticles, often foliated. The later granites subsequent to the plication of the schists have a wide distribution on the Ben Macdhui and Ben Avon range, and on Lochnagar; they stretch eastwards from Ballater by Tarland to Aberdeen and north to Bennachie. Isolated masses appear at Peterhead and at Strichen.

Though consisting mainly of biotite granite, these later intrusions pass by intermediate stages into diorite, as in the area between Balmoral and the head-waters of the River Gairn. The granites have been extensively quarried at Rubislaw, Peterhead and Kemnay.

Serpentinite and troctolite, the precise age of which is uncertain, occur at the Black Dog Rock north of Aberdeen, at Belhelvie and near Oldmeldrum. Where the schists of sedimentary origin have been pierced by these igneous intrusions, they are charged with contact minerals such as sillimanite, cordierite, kyanite and andalusite. Cordierite-bearing rocks occur near Ellon, at the foot of Bennachie, and on the top of the Buck of Cabrach.

A banded and mottled calc-silicate hornfels occurring with the limestone at Derry Falls, west-northwest of Braemar, has yielded malacolite, wollastonite, brown idocrase, garnet, sphene and hornblende.

A larger list of minerals has been obtained from an exposure of limestone and associated beds in Glen Gairn, about four miles (6 km) above the point where that river joins the Dee.

Narrow belts of Old Red Sandstone, resting unconformably on the old platform of slates and schists, have been traced from the north coast at Peterhead by Turriff to Fyvie, and also from Huntly by Gartly to Kildrummy Castle. The strata consist mainly of conglomerates and sandstones, which, at Gartly and at Rhynie, are associated with lenticular bands of andesite indicating contemporaneous volcanic action. Small outliers of conglomerate and sandstone of this age have recently been found in the course of excavations in Aberdeen.

The glacial deposits, especially in the belt bordering the coast between Aberdeen and Peterhead, furnish important evidence. The ice moved eastwards off the high ground at the head of the Dee and the Don, while the mass spreading outwards from the Moray Firth invaded the low plateau of Buchan; but at a certain stage there was a marked defection northwards parallel with the coast, as proved by the deposit of red clay north of Aberdeen. At a later date the local glaciers laid down materials on top of the red clay.

The committee appointed by the British Association proved that the Greensand, which has yielded a large suite of Cretaceous fossils at Moreseat in the parish of Cruden, occurs in glacial drift, resting probably on granite. The strata from which the Moreseat fossils were derived are not now found in place in that part of Scotland. Chalk flints are widely distributed in the drift between Fyvie and the east coast of Buchan. At Plaidy a patch of clay with Liassic fossils occurs. At several localities between Logie Coldstone and Dinnet a deposit of diatomite (Kieselguhr) occurs beneath the peat.

=== Flora and fauna ===
The tops of the highest mountains have an Arctic flora. At the royal lodge on Loch Muick, 411 m (1,348 ft) above the sea, grow larches, vegetables, currants, laurels, roses, etc. Some ash-trees, 1 to 1.5 m (4 or 5 ft) in girth, grow at 400 m (1,300 ft) above the sea. Trees, especially Scotch fir and larch, grow well, and Braemar has plentiful natural timber, said to surpass any in the north of Europe. Stumps of Scotch fir and oak found in peat sometimes far exceed any now growing in size.

Moles occur at 550 m (1,800 ft) above the sea, and squirrels at 450 m (1,480 ft). Grouse, partridges and hares abound, and rabbits are often numerous. Red deer abound in Braemar, which in 1911 had the most extensive deer forest in Scotland.

== Economy ==
=== Agriculture ===
Except in the mountainous districts, Aberdeenshire has a comparatively mild climate, owing to the proximity of much of the shire to the sea. The mean annual temperature at Braemar reaches 6 °C (43 °F), and that at Aberdeen 8 °C (46 °F). The mean yearly rainfall varies from about 750 to 950 mm (30 to 37 in). In summer the upper Dee and Don valleys provide the driest and most bracing climate in the British Isles, and grain grows cultivated up to 500 m (1,600 ft) above the sea, or 100 to 150 m (330 to 490 ft) higher than elsewhere in North Britain. Poor, gravelly, clayey and peaty soils prevail, but tile-draining, bones and guano, and the best methods of modern tillage, greatly increased the produce.

Indeed, in 1911, no part of Scotland had a more productive soil developed out of such unpromising material. Farm-houses and steadings have much improved, and the best agricultural implements and machines get widespread use. About two-thirds of the population depend entirely on agriculture. Farms are small compared with those in the south-eastern counties. Oats form the predominant crop, wheat has practically gone out of cultivation, but barley has largely increased.

The most distinctive industry in 1911 was cattle-feeding. Aberdeenshire fattens a great number of the home-bred crosses for the London and local markets, and imports Irish animals on an extensive scale for the same purpose, while an exceedingly heavy trade in dead meat for London and the south occurs all over the county. Farmers also raise sheep, horses and pigs in large numbers.

Since the encyclopedia article was published in 1911, there have been significant changes. Few Irish cattle now come in, the area is still famed for cattle, more commonly continental breeds, with most slaughtered in Scotland, and in particular a good local abattoir capacity. Spring Barley is the predominant crop, and in lowland Winter Wheat, Oil Seed Rape & Potatoes would be more common than oats. There is also a significant area of carrots grown. With no slaughter capacity in Scotland the pig industry is diminishing but still a very important part of the North East economy. Farm sizes are perhaps still relatively smaller than UK but there are some significant agribusinesses in Aberdeenshire. Few farmers raise horses, though horses are more common, kept by private owners & specialists, than in any other area of Scotland.

=== Fisheries ===
In 1911 a large fishing population in villages along the coast engage in the white and herring fishery, fostering the next most important industry to agriculture.

Aberdeenshire fishing developed almost exclusively due to the introduction of steam trawlers. In 1911 the total value of the annual catch, of which between a half and a third consists of herrings, amounts to £1,000,000.

In 1911 the industry produced both speldings (salted and rock-dried haddocks) and finnans (smoked haddocks). The ports and creeks belong to the fishery districts of Peterhead, Fraserburgh and Aberdeen, the last of which includes also three Kincardineshire ports. The herring season for Aberdeen, Peterhead and Fraserburgh lasts from June to September, at which time the ports become crowded with boats from other Scottish districts. Valuable salmon-fishings exist – rod, net and stake-net – on the Dee, Don, Ythan and Ugie.

In 1911 the average annual despatch of salmon from Aberdeenshire comprises about 400 long tons (450 short tons).

=== Other industries ===
Manufactures mainly cluster in or near Aberdeen, but throughout the rural districts one finds much milling of corn, brick and tile making, smith-work, brewing and distilling, cart and farm-implement making, casting and drying of peat, and timber-felling, especially on Deeside and Donside, for pit-props, railway sleepers, laths and barrel staves. A number of paper-making establishments operate, most of them on the Don near Aberdeen.

In 1911 the chief mineral wealth comes from the noted durable granite, quarried at Aberdeen, Kemnay, Peterhead and elsewhere including for causewaying stones. Sandstone and other rocks are also quarried at different parts. The shire imports mostly coal, lime, timber, iron, slate, raw materials for the textile manufactures, wheat, cattle-feeding stuffs, bones, guano, sugar, alcoholic liquors, fruits. The exports include granite (rough-dressed and polished), flax, woollen and cotton goods, paper, combs, preserved provisions, oats, barley, and live and dead cattle.

In last quarter of the 20th Century and into the 21st the North Sea oil industry was to become a large employer and overseas revenue earner. Much of the industry's onshore facilities are based in Aberdeen.

== Transport ==
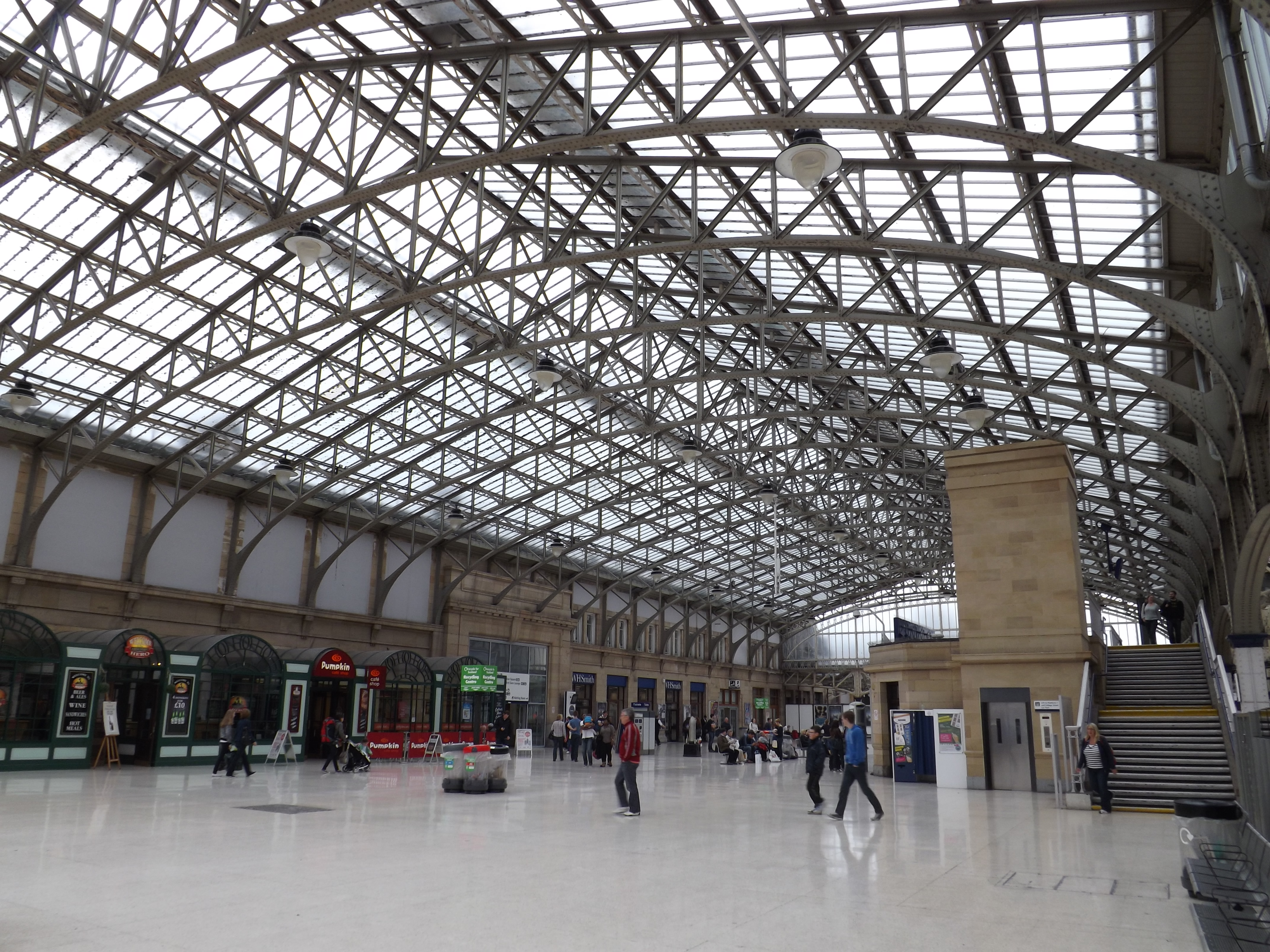
Aberdeen railway station

On the south, Aberdeen has rail links with Stonehaven, Montrose and Dundee, and to the north-west a line runs to Inverness via Huntly, Keith and Elgin.

Branch lines from various points used to run to several smaller towns, e.g. from Aberdeen to Ballater by Deeside, from Aberdeen to Fraserburgh (with a branch at Maud for Peterhead and at Ellon for Cruden Bay and Boddam), from Kintore to Alford, and from Inverurie to Oldmeldrum and also to Macduff. These lines all closed, largely as a result of the Beeching Axe in the 1960s, they now serve as local pathways or bicycle tracks.

By sea Aberdeenshire has regular communication with the Orkney Islands and the Shetland Islands.

The highest of the macadamized roads crossing the eastern Grampians rises to a point 2,200 ft (670 m) above sea-level.

Over the 20th Century road and air communications have improved. Aberdeen Airport is an international airport, located at Dyce, a suburb of Aberdeen, approximately 5 nautical miles (9.3 km; 5.8 mi) north-west of Aberdeen city centre. A total of nearly 3.5 million passengers used the airport in 2015, a fall of 6.8% compared with 2014.

== Population and government ==
In 1801 the population numbered 284,036 and in 1901 304,439 (of whom 159,603 were females), or 154 persons to the square mile (59/km^{2}). In 1901 Aberdeenshire had 8 persons who spoke Gaelic only, and 1333 who spoke Gaelic and English. The chief towns include Aberdeen (population in 1901, 153,503), Bucksburn (2231), Fraserburgh (9105), Huntly (4136), Inverurie (3624), Peterhead (11,794), Turriff (2273). The county total was 137, 962 in 1971.

In 1911 the Supreme Court of Justiciary sat in Aberdeen to try cases from the counties of Aberdeen, Banff and Kincardine. The three counties are under a sheriff, and two sheriffs-substitute reside in Aberdeen, and also sat at Fraserburgh, Huntly, Peterhead and Turriff. The sheriff courts occurred in Aberdeen and Peterhead.

The higher branches of education have always been thoroughly taught in the schools throughout the shire, and pupils have long been in the habit of going directly from the schools to the university.

According to the 1911 Encyclopædia, Aberdeenshire people have a quick, sharp, rather angry accent. The local Scots dialect, affectionately known as the Doric, appears broad, and rich in diminutives, and is noted for the use of /i/ in bane and stane and muin but /wi/ before /g/ and /k/ in guid and cuit etc., the /f/ realisation of wh, /d/ for medial th /ð/ etc. As recently as 1830 Gaelic provided the fireside language of almost every family in Braemar, but by the start of the 20th century was little used.

== Symbols ==
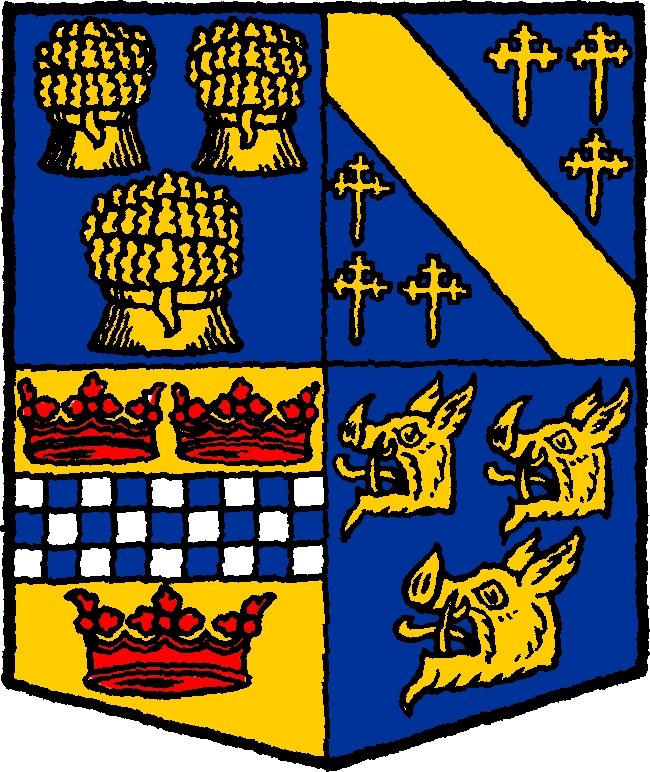
Arms of the former county council

The coat of arms of Aberdeenshire County Council was granted in 1890. The four quarters represented the Buchan, Mar, Garioch and Strathbogie areas.

In 2023, a competition was held to choose a county flag. The result, a flag designed by local school pupils, was raised at Castle Fraser on 22 April 2023.

== Constituencies ==
There was an Aberdeenshire constituency of the House of Commons of the Parliament of Great Britain from 1708 to 1801 and of the Parliament of the United Kingdom from 1801 to 1868. This constituency did not include the parliamentary burgh of Aberdeen, which was represented as a component of Aberdeen District of Burghs until 1832, when it was enlarged and became the Aberdeen burgh constituency. The other components of the district of burghs became components of the then new Montrose District of Burghs.

In 1868 the Aberdeenshire constituency was divided to form two new county divisions, or county constituencies, namely Eastern Aberdeenshire and Western Aberdeenshire.

In 1885 the Aberdeen burgh constituency was divided to form the burgh constituencies of Aberdeen North and Aberdeen South.

In 1918 Aberdeenshire and Kincardineshire were treated as if a single county for parliamentary representation purposes, with the area of the Kincardineshire county constituency and the Aberdeenshire constituencies being divided into three new constituencies, Kincardine and Western Aberdeenshire, Aberdeen and Kincardine Central and Aberdeen and Kincardine East. Kincardine and Western Aberdeenshire included the whole of the former Kincardineshire constituency.

In 1950 the area of the former Kincardineshire constituency (as abolished in 1918) was merged into the then new North Angus and Mearns constituency, and the Aberdeenshire area was divided into the East Aberdeenshire constituency and the West Aberdeenshire constituency, but the boundary between these new eastern and western constituencies differed from that for the constituencies of the 1868 to 1918 period.

Boundary changes in 1955 enlarged the Aberdeenshire West constituency, and reduced the size of the Aberdeenshire East constituency.

In 1983, eight years after the local government county of Aberdeenshire was abolished, the Aberdeenshire constituencies were replaced with new constituencies.

== Towns and villages ==
- Aberdeen
- Aboyne
- Alford
- Auchnagatt
- Ballater
- Balmedie
- Barthol Chapel
- Belhelvie
- Bieldside
- Blackburn
- Boddam
- Braegarie
- Braemar
- Braeside
- Bridge of Alford
- Bridge of Don
- Broomhill
- Buchanhaven
- Cabrach
- Cairnbulg
- Clatt
- Collieston
- Cornhill
- Craigiebuckler
- Crimond
- Cruden Bay
- Crudie
- Cults
- Cuminestown
- Cummings Park
- Danestone
- Daviot
- Dinnet
- Dunecht
- Dyce
- Echt
- Ellon
- Ferrydee
- Fetterangus
- Finzean
- Footdee
- Foresterhill
- Fraserburgh
- Fyvie
- Garthdee
- Gartly
- Hatton
- Hatton of Fintray
- Hazlehead
- Hilton
- Huntly
- Insch
- Inverallochy
- Inverugie
- Inverurie
- Kaimhill
- Keig
- Kemnay
- Kennethmont
- Kincardine O'Neil
- Kingseat
- Kingswells
- Kintore
- Kirkton of Skene
- Logie Coldstone
- Longhaven
- Longside
- Lonmay
- Lumphanan
- Lumsden
- Lyne of Skene
- Mannofield
- Mastrick
- Maud
- Memsie
- Methlick
- Midstocket
- Milltimber
- Mintlaw
- Monymusk
- New Byth
- Newburgh
- New Deer
- New Leeds
- New Pitsligo
- Newmachar
- Northfield
- Old Deer
- Oldmeldrum
- Old Rayne
- Peterculter
- Peterhead
- Pitmedden
- Port Elphinstone
- Potterton
- Rhynie
- Rosehearty
- Rosemount
- Rothienorman
- Rubislaw
- Ruthven
- St Combs
- St Fergus
- Stoneywood
- Strathdon
- Strichen
- Stuartfield
- Tarland
- Tarves
- Tillydrone
- Torphins
- Turriff
- Tyrie
- Udny Green
- West End
- Westhill
- Woodside

== Places of interest ==
- Aden Country Park
- Balmoral Castle
- Bullers of Buchan
- Cairness House
- Deer Abbey, Old Deer
- Fyvie Castle
- Haddo House
- Huntly Castle
- Kinnaird Head Lighthouses

== See also ==
- List of counties of Scotland 1890–1975
- Medieval Diocese of Aberdeen
