= Areas of Aberdeen =

List of areas of Aberdeen, Scotland

The city of Aberdeen, Scotland, contains a number of areas and suburbs, some of which are historically separate settlements that have been absorbed by the expanding city.

- Airyhall
- Altens
- Ashgrove
- Berryden
- Bieldside
- Braeside
- Bridge of Dee
- Bridge of Don
- Broomhill
- Bucksburn
- Cornhill
- Countesswells
- Cove Bay
- Craigiebuckler
- Cults
- Cummings Park
- Danestone
- Donside Village
- Dyce
- Ferryhill
- Fittie
- Foresterhill
- Froghall
- Garthdee
- Hanover
- Hazlehead
- Heathryfold
- Hilton
- Kaimhill
- Kincorth
- Kingswells
- Kittybrewster
- Leggart
- Mannofield
- Mastrick
- Middlefield
- Midstocket
- Milltimber
- Nigg
- Northfield
- Old Aberdeen
- Peterculter
- Pittodrie
- Powis
- Queen's Cross
- Rosehill
- Rosemount
- Rubislaw
- Ruthrieston
- Seafield
- Seaton
- Sheddocksley
- Stockethill
- Stoneywood
- Summerhill
- Sunnybank
- Tillydrone
- Torry
- Tullos
- Woodside
