= Politics of Aberdeen =

Overview of politics in Scottish city

The Politics of Aberdeen, Scotland have changed significantly in recent years. In 1996, under the Local Government etc. (Scotland) Act 1994, Grampian Regional Council and Aberdeen District Council were dissolved, creating the new unitary Aberdeen City Council to represent the city's council area.

== Aberdeen City Council ==
Aberdeen City Council represents the Aberdeen City council area of Scotland. As of 2022, Aberdeen City Council comprises 45 councillors, who represent the city's thirteen multi-member wards. The council is chaired by the Lord Provost.

The council area was created in 1996 under the Local Government etc. (Scotland) Act 1994. However, a sense of Aberdeen as a city, with its own city council, can be traced back to 1900, when the city of county of Aberdeen was created. In 1975, under the Local Government (Scotland) Act 1973, the county of Aberdeen was combined with Bucksburn, Dyce, Newhills, Old Machar, Peterculter and the Stoneywood areas of the county of Aberdeen and, the Nigg area of the county of Kincardine, (including Cove Bay) to form the Aberdeen district of the Grampian region.

On 9 May 1995, by resolution under section 23 of the Local Government (Scotland) Act 1973, the City of Aberdeen Council changed the name of the local government area of "City of Aberdeen" to "Aberdeen City", which remains the existing unitary council area.

Prior to the 2003 election, the council had been considered a Labour stronghold. Between 2003 and 2007, the council was under the control of a Liberal Democrat and Conservative coalition, holding 23 of the 43 seats on the council. Following the May 2007 election, contested for the first time using a system of proportional representation, the Liberal Democrats and the Scottish National Party (SNP) formed a coalition to run the council, holding 27 of the 43 seats (following an SNP by-election gain from the Conservatives on 16 August 2007, the Liberal Democrat/SNP coalition held 28 of the 43 seats). At the May 2012 election, Labour entered into a coalition with the Conservatives and the independents to run the council, with 23 out of the 43 seats.

=== Composition (2003–2007) ===
The city council's original composition from 1995 used 43 wards while using the standard first-past-the-post voting system. The final group of representative councillors and their political parties using this system were:

Party	Ward	Councillor
Liberal Democrat	(34) Ashley	Martin Greig
Scottish National Party	(9) Auchmill	Kevin Stewart
Labour	(2) Bankhead/Stoneywood	Brian Rattary
Liberal Democrat	(21) Berryden	John Stewart
Liberal Democrat	(6) Bridge of Don	Millie McLeod
Liberal Democrat	(35) Broomhill	Ian Yuill
Labour	(28) Castlehill	Jim Hunter
Liberal Democrat	(32) Cults	Aileen Malone
Labour	(10) Cummings Park	Gordon Graham
Liberal Democrat	(3) Danestone	Raymond Hutcheon
Scottish National Party	(7) Donmouth	Muriel Jaffrey
Liberal Democrat	(38) Duthie	Irene Cormack
Liberal Democrat	(1) Dyce	Ron Clark
Liberal Democrat	(36) Garthdee	Scott Cassie
Liberal Democrat	(26) Gilcomston	Alison Smith
Liberal Democrat	(29) Hazlehead	Karen Freel
Labour	(15) Hilton	George Adam
Liberal Democrat	(37) Holburn	David Falconer
Liberal Democrat	(4) Jesmond	Gordon Leslie
Labour	(42) Kincorth East	George Urquhart
Independent	(41) Kincorth West	David Clyne
Liberal Democrat	(19) Kittybrewster	Neil Fletcher
Liberal Democrat	(27) Langstane	Steve Delaney
Liberal Democrat	(43) Loirston	Katherine Dean
Conservative	(33) Mannofield	Jill Wisely
Labour	(12) Mastrick	Ramsey Milne
Conservative	(24) Midstocket	John Porter
Liberal Democrat	(31) Murtle	Matthew Duncan
Liberal Democrat	(8) Newhills	Peter Stephen
Liberal Democrat	(5) Oldmachar	John Reynolds
Liberal Democrat	(30) Peterculter	Pamela MacDonald
Labour	(23) Pittodrie	Ronald Webster
Conservative	(25) Queens Cross	Brenda Craig
Labour	(18) Seaton	Norman Collie
Labour	(13) Sheddocksley	James Lamond
Scottish National Party	(11) Springhill	Karen Shirron
Labour	(17) St. Machar	Sandra Macdonald
Labour	(20) Stockethill	June Lamond
Labour	(14) Summerhill	Len Ironside
Scottish National Party	(22) Sunnybank	Andrew May
Labour	(39) Torry	Yvonne Allan
Scottish National Party	(40) Tullos	Jim Kiddie
Scottish National Party	(16) Woodside/Tillydrone	Alan Gowers
Source: Aberdeen City Council

== New wards from May 2007 ==
Before May 2007, councillors represented 43 single-member wards, but since then, all seats have been contested by the first-past-the-post electoral system. On 5 May 2007, it was the first election to use the single transferable vote system of election and multi-member wards, each ward electing three or four councillors. The Local Government Boundary Commission for Scotland completed its final recommendations for new wards for all the council areas of Scotland and for Aberdeen it was concluded that there would be 13 multi-member wards with a total of 43 councillors. This system was introduced as a result of the Local Governance (Scotland) Act 2004, and was designed to produce a form of proportional representation.

The composition of wards changed to:

4 councillors:

- (1) Dyce/Bucksburn/Danestone
- (2) Bridge of Don
- (10) Hazlehead/Ashley/Queens Cross
- (12) Torry/Ferryhill

3 councillors:

- (3) Kingswells/Sheddocksley – name later changed to Kingswells/Sheddocksley/Summerhill
- (4) Northfield (name later changed to Northfield/Mastrick North
- (5) Hilton/Stockethill – name later changed to Hilton/Woodside/Stockethill
- (6) Tillydrone/Seaton/Old Aberdeen
- (7) Midstocket/Rosemount
- (8) George Street/Harbour
- (9) Lower Deeside
- (11) Airyhall/Broomhill/Garthdee
- (13) Kincorth/Loirston – name later changed to Kincorth/Nigg/Cove

=== Composition (2007–2012) ===
Ward	Councillors	Party
Dyce/Bucksburn/Danestone	Ron Clark	Liberal Democrat
	Barney Crockett	Labour
	Mark McDonald	Scottish National Party
	George Penny	Liberal Democrat
Bridge of Don	Muriel Jaffrey	Scottish National Party
	Gordon Leslie	Liberal Democrat
	John Reynolds	Liberal Democrat
	Willie Young	Labour
Kingswells/Sheddocksley	Len Ironside	Labour
	Peter Stephen	Liberal Democrat
	Wendy Stuart	Scottish National Party
Northfield	Jackie Dunbar	Scottish National Party
	Gordon Graham	Labour
	Kevin Stewart	Scottish National Party
Hilton/Stockethill	George Adam	Labour
	Neil Fletcher	Liberal Democrat
	Kirsty West	Scottish National Party
Tillydrone/Seaton/Old Aberdeen	Norman Collie	Labour
	Jim Noble	Scottish National Party
	Richard Robertson	Liberal Democrat
Midstocket/Rosemount	Bill Cormie	Scottish National Party
	Jenny Laing	Labour
	John Corral	Scottish National Party
George Street/Harbour	Andrew May	Scottish National Party
	Jim Hunter	Labour
	John Stewart	Liberal Democrat
Lower Deeside	Mary Boulton	Independent
	Aileen Malone	Liberal Democrat
	Alan Milne	Conservative
Hazlehead/Ashley/Queens Cross	Jim Farquharson	Conservative
	Martin Greig	Liberal Democrat
	Jennifer Stewart	Liberal Democrat
	John West	Scottish National Party
Airyhall/Broomhill/Garthdee	Scott Cassie	Liberal Democrat
	Jill Wisely	Conservative
	Ian Yuill	Liberal Democrat
Torry/Ferryhill	Yvonne Allan	Labour
	Irene Cormack	Liberal Democrat
	Alan Donnelly	Conservative
	Jim Kiddle	Scottish National Party
Kincorth/Loirston	Neil Cooney	Labour
	Kate Dean	Liberal Democrat
	Callum McCaig	Scottish National Party

==== Changes since 2007 Election ====
- A by-election was held in the Midstocket/Rosemount Ward following the death of the Conservatives' John Porter on 23 May 2007. The by-election, on 16 August 2007, was won by the SNP's John Corall.
- In January 2011, Tillydrone/Seaton/Old Aberdeen Cllr Norman Collie resigned from the Labour Party and sat as an independent.
- A by-election was held in the Dyce/Bucksburn/Danestone Ward following the death of the Liberal Democrat's Ron Clark on 21 February 2011. The by-election, on 19 May 2011, was won by the SNP's Neil MacGregor.
- In June 2011, Hazlehead/Ashley/Queens Cross Cllr Jim Farquaharson was expelled from the Conservative Party and sat as an independent.
- In June 2011, Lower Deeside Cllr Alan Milne was expelled from the Conservative Party and sat as an independent.
- A by-election was held in the Airyhall/Broomhill/Garthdee Ward following the resignation of the Liberal Democrat's Scott Cassie on 27 April 2011 after he was jailed for embezzlement. The by-election, on 23 June 2011, was won by the SNP's Gordon Scott Townson.
- In September 2011, Bridge of Don Cllr Gordon Leslie was suspended from the Liberal Democrats. He subsequently resigned from the party and sat as an independent.
- In February 2012, George Street/Harbour Cllr Jim Hunter was suspended from the Labour Party. He subsequently resigned from the party and sat as an independent.
- In March 2012, Bridge of Don Cllr John Reynolds resigned from the Liberal Democrats and sat as an independent.

=== Composition (2012–2017) ===
Ward	Councillors	Party
Dyce/Bucksburn/Danestone	Barney Crockett	Labour
	Graeme Lawrence	Labour
	Neil MacGregor	Scottish National Party
	Gill Samarai	Scottish National Party
Bridge of Don	Muriel Jaffrey	Scottish National Party
	John Reynolds	Independent
	Sandy Stuart	Scottish National Party
	Willie Young	Labour
Kingswells/Sheddocksley/Summerhill	David Cameron	Scottish National Party
	Steve Delaney	Liberal Democrat
	Len Ironside	Labour
Northfield/Mastrick North	Scott Carle	Labour
	Jackie Dunbar	Scottish National Party
	Gordon Graham	Labour
Hilton/Woodside/Stockethill	George Adam	Labour
	Kirsty Blackman ("née" West)	Scottish National Party
	Lesley Dunbar	Labour
Tillydrone/Seaton/Old Aberdeen	Ross Grant	Labour
	Ramsey Milne	Labour
	Jim Noble	Scottish National Party
Midstocket/Rosemount	Bill Cormie	Scottish National Party
	Fraser Forsyth	Independent
	Jenny Laing	Labour
George Street/Harbour	Andrew May	Scottish National Party
	Jean Morrison	Labour
	Nathan Morrison	Labour
Lower Deeside	Mary Boulton	Independent
	M. Tauqeer Malik	Labour
	Aileen Malone	Liberal Democrat
Hazlehead/Ashley/Queens Cross	John Corall	SNP
	Martin Greig	Liberal Democrat
	Jennifer Stewart	Liberal Democrat
	Ross Thomson	Conservative
Airyhall/Broomhill/Garthdee	Angela Taylor	Labour
	Gordon Townson	SNP
	Ian Yuill	Liberal Democrat
Torry/Ferryhill	Yvonne Allan	Labour
	Graham Dickson	Scottish National Party
	Alan Donnelly	Independent
	Jim Kiddle	Scottish National Party
Kincorth/Nigg/Cove	Neil Cooney	Labour
	Andrew Finlayson	Independent
	Callum McCaig	Scottish National Party

==== Changes since 2012 Election ====
- In January 2014, Torry/Ferryhill Cllr Alan Donnelly was expelled from the Conservative Party group and sits as an independent.
- In May 2014, Midstocket/Rosemount Cllr Jenny Laing replaced Dyce/Bucksburn/Danestone Cllr Barney Crockett as Leader of the Council.
- In May 2014, Midstocket/Rosemount Cllr Fraser Forsyth resigned from the Conservative Party group and sits as an independent.

== UK Parliament ==
In the United Kingdom Parliament, the city is divided between two constituencies:

Party	Constituency	Member
Scottish National Party	Aberdeen North	Kirsty Blackman
Scottish National Party	Aberdeen South	Stephen Flynn

== Scottish Parliament ==
There are three Scottish Parliament constituencies that overlap the Aberdeen City Council area in the North East Scotland electoral region:

Party	Constituency	Member
Scottish National Party	Aberdeen Central	Kevin Stewart
Scottish National Party	Aberdeen Donside	Jackie Dunbar
Scottish National Party	Aberdeen South and North Kincardine	Audrey Nicoll

Other MSPs in the North East Scotland electoral region (but selected by the Additional Member proportional representation system, and not in constituencies overlapping Aberdeen City or the Aberdeen City Council area) are:

Party	Members
Labour	Mercedes Villalba
Labour	Michael Marra
Conservative	Maurice Golden
Conservative	Tess White
Conservative	Liam Kerr
Conservative	Douglas Lumsden
Scottish Greens	Maggie Chapman

== Scottish independence referendum ==
In 2014 a referendum was held asking voters in Scotland the question: "Should Scotland be an independent country?" The referendum was held by the SNP administration after their victory in the 2011 Scottish Parliament election to determine whether Scotland should become an independent nation or remain a devolved part of the United Kingdom. Of the 3,623,344 votes cast (on a turnout of 84.6%) 2,001,926 were in favour of a "No" vote (55.3%) while 1,617,989 were "Yes" (44.7%): leading to Scotland remaining part of the United Kingdom.

The Aberdeen City local authority area had a higher than average No vote. 84,094 voters in the area voted against independence (58.6%) while 59,390 voted in favour of independence (41.4%). The Aberdeen City council area had the third lowest turnout in Scotland with 143,484 valid ballot papers on a turnout of 81.7%, ahead of Dundee and Glasgow.

== Twinned cities ==
Aberdeen is twinned with several cities across Europe and throughout the rest of the world. These include:

- - Bulawayo, Zimbabwe
- - Clermont-Ferrand, France
- - Gomel, Belarus
- - Houston, United States (as part of Grampian)
- - Regensburg, Germany
- - Stavanger, Norway

== See also ==
- Aberdeen City Youth Council
- Politics of Dundee
- Politics of Edinburgh
- Politics of Glasgow
- Politics of Scotland
- Politics of the Highland council area
