= List of listed buildings in Tyrie, Aberdeenshire =

This is a list of listed buildings in the parish of Tyrie in Aberdeenshire, Scotland.

== List ==
Name	Location	Date listed	Grid ref. (Note: Sometimes known as OSGB36, the grid reference (where provided) is based on the British national grid reference system used by the Ordnance Survey. • "Guide to National Grid". Ordnance Survey. • "Get-a-map". Ordnance Survey.)	Geo-coordinates	Notes	LB number (Note: Historic Environment Scotland assign a unique alphanumeric identifier to each designated site in Scotland, for listed buildings this always begins with "LB", for example "LB12345".)	Image
Boyndlie House, South Lodge				57°38′45″N 2°08′15″W	Category C(S)	16448	Upload Photo
79 High Street				57°35′28″N 2°11′47″W	Category B	16457	Upload Photo
Old Manse, High Street				57°35′54″N 2°12′00″W	Category B	16433	Upload Photo
92 Low Street				57°35′39″N 2°11′46″W	Category C(S)	16441	Upload Photo
Parish Church Of St. Andrew, Tyrie				57°39′28″N 2°07′08″W	Category B	16443	Upload another image See more images
Burn Of Marno, Farmhouse				57°37′58″N 2°06′03″W	Category C(S)	16449	Upload Photo
Pitsligo Arms Hotel. Gatepiers To Rear Court				57°35′41″N 2°11′58″W	Category B	16454	Upload Photo
24 High Street				57°35′49″N 2°12′00″W	Category B	16435	Upload Photo
53 High Street				57°35′40″N 2°11′56″W	Category B	16455	Upload Photo
48 High Street				57°35′42″N 2°11′56″W	Category B	16438	Upload Photo
Tyrie Manse				57°39′26″N 2°07′19″W	Category B	16445	Upload Photo
Bank Of Scotland High Street				57°35′39″N 2°11′56″W	Category C(S)	16456	Upload Photo
26 High Street				57°35′48″N 2°12′00″W	Category C(S)	16436	Upload Photo
Tyrie Churchyard				57°39′28″N 2°07′10″W	Category B	16444	Upload another image
Boyndlie House Offices				57°38′54″N 2°08′35″W	Category C(S)	16447	Upload Photo
Nethertown, The Workshop				57°36′20″N 2°12′33″W	Category C(S)	16452	Upload Photo
Pitsligo Arms Hotel, High Street				57°35′41″N 2°11′57″W	Category B	16453	Upload Photo
22 High Street				57°35′49″N 2°12′00″W	Category B	16434	Upload Photo
64 High Street				57°35′38″N 2°11′53″W	Category C(S)	16439	Upload Photo
Bridge Over Gonar Burn On Drive To Tillinamolt				57°37′00″N 2°10′38″W	Category B	16451	Upload Photo
Episcopal Church Of St. John The Evangelist, High Street Including Wall And Railings To High Street				57°35′35″N 2°11′51″W	Category A	16440	Upload another image See more images
Ladysford House				57°38′13″N 2°10′47″W	Category B	16450	Upload Photo
81 High Street				57°35′27″N 2°11′46″W	Category C(S)	16432	Upload Photo
32 High Street				57°35′46″N 2°11′59″W	Category B	16437	Upload Photo
New Pitsligo Parish Church, Church Street				57°35′42″N 2°12′10″W	Category C(S)	16442	Upload another image See more images
Boyndlie House				57°38′54″N 2°08′29″W	Category C(S)	16446	Upload Photo

== Key ==
The scheme for classifying buildings in Scotland is:

- Category A: "buildings of national or international importance, either architectural or historic; or fine, little-altered examples of some particular period, style or building type."
- Category B: "buildings of regional or more than local importance; or major examples of some particular period, style or building type, which may have been altered."
- Category C: "buildings of local importance; lesser examples of any period, style, or building type, as originally constructed or moderately altered; and simple traditional buildings which group well with other listed buildings."

In March 2016 there were 47,288 listed buildings in Scotland. Of these, 8% were Category A, and 50% were Category B, with the remaining 42% being Category C.

== See also ==
- List of listed buildings in Aberdeenshire
