= List of acts of the Parliament of Scotland from 1491 =

This is a list of acts of the Parliament of Scotland for the year 1491.

It lists acts of Parliament of the old Parliament of Scotland, that was merged with the old Parliament of England to form the Parliament of Great Britain, by the Union with England Act 1707 (c. 7).

For other years, see list of acts of the Parliament of Scotland. For the period after 1707, see list of acts of the Parliament of Great Britain.

== 1491 ==
=== April ===
The 3rd parliament of James IV, held in Edinburgh from 28 April 1491 until 20 May 1491.

Short title, or popular name	Citation	Royal assent
Long title
Church Act 1491 (repealed)	April 1491 c. 1 (Note: This is the citation in the Record Edition.) — (Note: This act is not listed in the Duodecimal Edition.)	28 April 1491
Of the fredommez of haly kirk. Of the freedoms of the holy church. (Repealed by Statute Law Revision (Scotland) Act 1906 (6 Edw. 7. c. 38))
France Act 1491 (repealed)	April 1491 c. 2; 1491 c. 23 (Note: This is the citation in the Duodecimal Edition.)	28 April 1491
Of the aliancez and confederacions betuix the realmez of France and Scotland. Of the alliances and confederations between the realms of France and Scotland. (Repealed by Statute Law Revision (Scotland) Act 1906 (6 Edw. 7. c. 38))
Royal Marriage Act 1491 (repealed)	April 1491 c. 3 —	28 April 1491
Of our soverane lordis mariage. Of our sovereign lord's marriage. (Repealed by Statute Law Revision (Scotland) Act 1906 (6 Edw. 7. c. 38))
Embassy to Denmark Act 1491 (repealed)	April 1491 c. 4 —	28 April 1491
Of an ambaxiate to the king of Denmark. (Note: John, King of Denmark.); Of an embassy to the king of Denmark. (Repealed by Statute Law Revision (Scotland) Act 1906 (6 Edw. 7. c. 38))
Brieves Act 1491 (repealed)	April 1491 c. 5; 1491 c. 24	28 April 1491
Of the brevez of the Chancellary. Of the brieves of the Chancellery. (Repealed by Statute Law Revision (Scotland) Act 1906 (6 Edw. 7. c. 38))
Liferent Caution Act 1491 still in force	April 1491 c. 6; 1491 c. 25	28 April 1491
Of landis fallin in ward to oure soverane lord or ony uthir baroun. Of lands falling in ward to our sovereign lord, or any other baron.
Leases Act 1491 still in force	April 1491 c. 7; 1491 c. 26	28 April 1491
Of the tennentis of landis that fallis in ward or ar uthir wayis alterit. Of the tenants of lands that fall in ward, or are in other ways altered.
Lawburrows Act 1491 (repealed)	April 1491 c. 8; 1491 c. 27	28 April 1491
Anent finding of lawborrois. Regarding findings of lawburrows. (Repealed by Statute Law Revision (Scotland) Act 1906 (6 Edw. 7. c. 38))
Murder Act 1491 (repealed)	April 1491 c. 9; 1491 c. 28	28 April 1491
Of the pursuit of slaaris and demembraris. Of the pursuit of murderers and dismemberers. (Repealed by Statute Law Revision (Scotland) Act 1906 (6 Edw. 7. c. 38))
Circuit Court Act 1491 (repealed)	April 1491 c. 10; 1491 c. 29	28 April 1491
Of Justice airis to be set and haldin twis in the yere. Of Justice ayres to be set and held twice in the year. (Repealed by Statute Law Revision (Scotland) Act 1906 (6 Edw. 7. c. 38))
Decrees for Expenses Act 1491 (repealed)	April 1491 c. 11; 1491 c. 30	28 April 1491
Anent the execucioun of decrettis for the costis and scaithis of partiis. Regarding the execution of decrees for the costs and injuries of parties. (Repealed by Statute Law Revision (Scotland) Act 1906 (6 Edw. 7. c. 38))
Currency Act 1491 (repealed)	April 1491 c. 12; 1491 c. 37	28 April 1491
Anent thame that refuse to tak gold that is crakkit. Regarding those that refuse to take hold that is cracked. (Repealed by Statute Law Revision (Scotland) Act 1906 (6 Edw. 7. c. 38))
Wapinschaws Act 1491 (repealed)	April 1491 c. 13; 1491 cc. 31-32	28 April 1491
Of wapynschawingis foure tymes in the yere. Of wapinschaws four times in the year. (Repealed by Statute Law Revision (Scotland) Act 1906 (6 Edw. 7. c. 38))
Truce on the Borders Act 1491 (repealed)	April 1491 c. 14 —	28 April 1491
Of dais of meting on the bordouris for the keping of the trewis. Of days of meeting on the borders for the keeping of the truce. (Repealed by Statute Law Revision (Scotland) Act 1906 (6 Edw. 7. c. 38))
Measures Act 1491 (repealed)	April 1491 c. 15; 1491 c. 33	28 April 1491
Of the statutis of mettis and mesuris. Of the statutes of mets and measures. (Repealed by Statute Law Revision (Scotland) Act 1906 (6 Edw. 7. c. 38))
Sessions Act 1491 (repealed)	April 1491 c. 16 —	28 April 1491
Of the sitting of the sessiounis. Of the sitting of the sessions. (Repealed by Statute Law Revision (Scotland) Act 1906 (6 Edw. 7. c. 38))
Leagues in Burghs Act 1491 (repealed)	April 1491 c. 17; 1491 c. 34	28 April 1491
Anent legis and bandis and convocacioun of commonis in burrowis. Regarding leagues and bonds, and gatherings of commoners in burghs. (Repealed by Statute Law Revision (Scotland) Act 1906 (6 Edw. 7. c. 38))
Brieves of Error Act 1491 (repealed)	April 1491 c. 18; 1491 c. 35	28 April 1491
Anent the breif and summondis of errour. Regarding the brieve and summons of error. (Repealed by Statute Law Revision (Scotland) Act 1906 (6 Edw. 7. c. 38))
Common Good Act 1491 still in force	April 1491 c. 19; 1491 c. 36	28 April 1491
Of the commoun gud of all burrowis. Of the common good of all burghs.
Proclamation of Laws Act 1419 (repealed)	April 1491 c. 20 —	28 April 1491
Anent the proclaming of thir actis and statutis. Regarding the proclaiming of the acts and statutes. (Repealed by Statute Law Revision (Scotland) Act 1906 (6 Edw. 7. c. 38))

=== February ===
A parliament of James IV, held in Edinburgh from 6 February 1492 until 20 February 1492.

Short title, or popular name	Citation	Royal assent
Long title
Royal Marriage (No. 2) Act 1491 (repealed)	February 1491 c. 1 (Note: This is the citation in the Record Edition.) — (Note: This act is not listed in the Duodecimal Edition.)	20 February 1492
Anent oure soverane lordis mariage. About our sovereign lord's marriage. (Repealed by Statute Law Revision (Scotland) Act 1906 (6 Edw. 7. c. 38))
Late King's Treasure Act 1491 (repealed)	February 1491 c. 2 —	20 February 1492
Anent the tressour that our soverane lordis faider haid the tyme of his deces. Regarding the treasure that our sovereign lord's father had at the time of his death. (Repealed by Statute Law Revision (Scotland) Act 1906 (6 Edw. 7. c. 38))
Late King's Murderers Act 1491 (repealed)	February 1491 c. 3 —	20 February 1492
Of the personis that slew our soverane lordis faidir. Of the persons that murdered our sovereign lord's father. (Repealed by Statute Law Revision (Scotland) Act 1906 (6 Edw. 7. c. 38))
Administration of Justice Act 1491 (repealed)	February 1491 c. 4 —	20 February 1492
Of the dew execucioun of the actis for the administracioun of Justice. Of the due execution of the acts for the administration of Justice. (Repealed by Statute Law Revision (Scotland) Act 1906 (6 Edw. 7. c. 38))

=== Sources ===
- Alexander, William (1841). "Acta Parliamentorum Regis Jacobi Quarti". An Abridgement of the Acts of the Parliaments of Scotland. Edinburgh: Adam and Charles Black. pp. 447–448 – via Google Books.
- Alexander, William (1841). "Acta Parliamentorum Regis Jacobi Quarti". An Abridgement of the Acts of the Parliaments of Scotland. Edinburgh: Adam and Charles Black. pp. 447–448 – via Google Books.
- Chronological Table of the Statutes. London: Her Majesty's Stationery Office. 1972. pp. 1325–1326 – via Google Books.
- "Acts of the Old Scottish Parliament: 1491". legislation.gov.uk. The National Archives.
- "Index of Statutes: James IV (1488-1513)". Records of the Parliaments of Scotland to 1707. University of St Andrews.

== See also ==
- List of legislation in the United Kingdom
- Records of the Parliaments of Scotland
