= Flag of Aberdeenshire =

Historic Scottish county flag

Aberdeenshire
- Proportion: 3:5
- Adopted: 22 April 2023
- Design: Party per pale or and purpure; on a castle triple-towered argent an ancient crown party per pale of the second and first
- Designed by: Meryn Wilson, Eliana Irwin, Zara Sim, Iris Main and Tristan Davidson

The Aberdeenshire flag is the flag of the traditional Scottish county of Aberdeenshire. It was registered with the Flag Institute on 22 April 2023.

== Design ==
The castle is symbolic of the many castles situated around Aberdeenshire (the county has been nicknamed "Scotland's Castle Country", being home to more than 260 castles). Also, together with the crown, the castle can also specifically represent the royal residence of Balmoral Castle. The gold stands for Aberdeenshire's fields of ripe barley (and the whisky produced from it), while the purple stands for the heather-covered mountains of the county.

The Pantone colours for the flag are:

Scheme	Yellow	Purple	White
Pantone (Paper)	1375 C	260 C	White
Web colours	#FF9E1B	#642667	#FFFFFF
RGB	255, 158, 27	100, 38, 103	255, 255, 255
CMYK	0%, 38%, 89%, 0%	3%, 63%, 0%, 60%	0%, 0%, 0%, 0%

== Competition ==
On 7 September 2022, a competition to design an official flag for Aberdeenshire was announced by The Press & Journal newspaper, in collaboration with the Aberdeenshire Lieutenancy, the Court of the Lord Lyon and the Flag Institute. The competition was open to everyone, with over 820 entries being received from across Aberdeenshire, the rest of Scotland and the UK, and even as far afield as Canada and New Zealand. A panel of judges reviewed the proposals before ultimately narrowing them down to a shortlist of five designs, which were submitted for a public vote on 1 December 2022, with polling remaining open until 13 January 2023. The winning design was revealed at a flag-raising ceremony at Castle Fraser on 22 April 2023.

Design A

The bright golden background represents light, due to Aberdeenshire being the first county in mainland Scotland to greet the rising sun, and providing a good view of the stars at night. The blue on the cross symbolises the River Don and the River Dee, and the green on the cross stands for the county's farmland and woodland. The red crown is from the coat of arms of the historic Aberdeenshire county council.

634 votes (15.07%)

Design B

The two salmon symbolise Aberdeenshire's fishing industry, both out at sea and in the waterways, with the salmon arranged in a cyclical pattern to symbolise the natural life cycle that unites both. The diagonal yellow lines represent the two ancient mormaer earldoms of the county - those of Mar (the diagonal orientation of the flag is also a homage to the arms of the Earl of Mar) and Buchan (with the flag's blue background also referencing the arms of the Earl of Buchan).

699 votes (16.11%)

Design C

The winning design.

1,450 votes (34.46%)

Design D

The barley sheaf is from the historic arms of Aberdeenshire, and also represents the county's whiskey industry. The granite crown symbolises the many castles located throughout Aberdeenshire, as well as its royal connections. The five black jewels are for the traditional areas of the historic county (Buchan, Formartine, Gairoch, Marr and Strathbogie). The black also represents the oil industry. The flag's green background symbolises Aberdeenshire's rich agriculture and natural wealth.

621 votes (14.76%)

Design E

The blue pall symbolises the Dee and Don rivers flowing through the county and into the North Sea. The golden outline symbolises the county's inland crops and coastal beaches. The flag's red background represents both the city of Aberdeen (the coat of arms of which is predominantly red) and the Cairngorms (whose Gaelic name, Am Monadh Ruadh, translates into "The Red Hills"). The red triangle at the bottom denotes a mountain in the Cairngorms.

804 votes (19.11%)
