= Braegarie =

Scottish settlement

Coordinates: 56.9844°N 3.4684°W

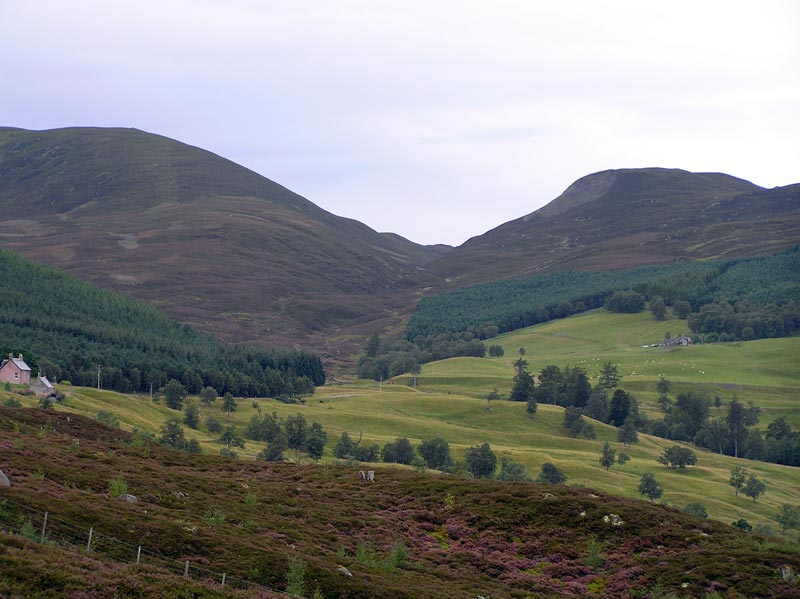
- View SW from the road by Mar Lodge and the River Dee. Braegarie is located adjacent to the forest on the right hand side of the image.

- Location within Aberdeenshire
- OS grid reference: NO1089
- Council area: Aberdeenshire
- Lieutenancy area: Aberdeenshire
- Country: Scotland
- Sovereign state: United Kingdom
- Police: Scotland
- Fire: Scottish
- Ambulance: Scottish

Braegarie or Bregary is a clachan on the Mar Lodge Estate in the Cairngorms National Park. Its name means brae – the slope of a river valley – and ghàraidh – a dry stone walled enclosure.

In 1632, the area was sold by the Earl of Mar to Alister Mackenzie to form the Corriemulzie estate. It then passed to Farquharson of Inverary who sold it to the Earl of Fife in 1785 so that it again became part of the Mar Estate.

In 1841, three households were recorded. In 1859, there were three small thatched farmhouses with associated outbuildings. In 1911, two households were recorded. The remaining house one of the three built before 1841 was extended to give a second floor in 1868. It remained occupied until about 1949 and was sold to the then secretary of the Cairngorm Club in 1982. At that time it was dilapidated and required renovation.
