= Danestone Congregational Church =

Church in Aberdeen, Scotland

Coordinates: 57°10′58″N 2°8′8″W

Danestone Congregational Church is a Congregational Christian Church located in the Danestone community of the Bridge of Don suburb in Aberdeen, Scotland. Originally established in 1986, the current church building was constructed in 1991.

In addition to traditional Sunday services, the church operates a Sunday School, Youth Group, Boys’ Brigade, Men's Group, Ladies’ Group, Good Afternoon Club and monthly services at Fairview Nursing Home. It is also supports missionary work. In Tanzania, the church created a project to provide support for AIDS.

Danestone Congregational Church is associated with the other Congregational churches of Aberdeen including the Peterhead, Balmedie, Potterton, Woodside, Kittybrewster and Cove churches.
