= Crudie =

Settlement in Aberdeenshire, Scotland

Coordinates: 57°36′22.68″N 2°20′40.18″W

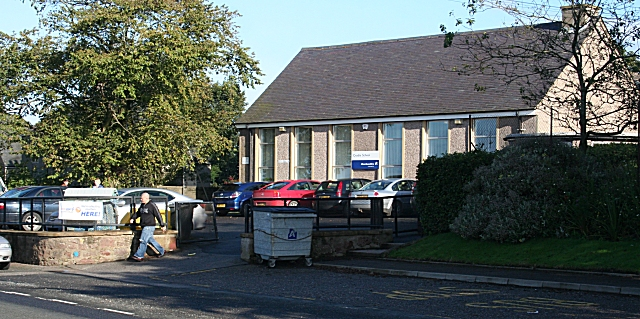
Crudie Primary School

Crudie is a settlement in Aberdeenshire, Scotland. It is situated on the A98. It has a primary school and a war memorial.
