= Hill of Fare =

Hill in Scotland

Coordinates: 57°06′55″N 2°32′33″W

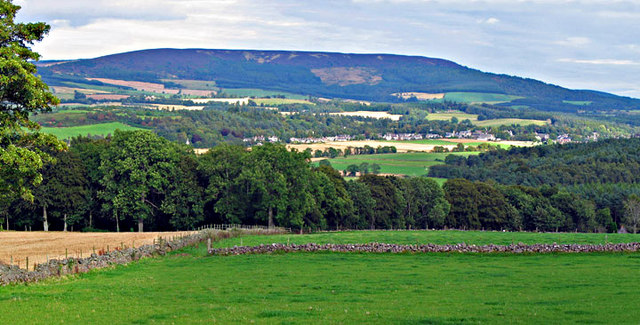
A view of the south side of the Hill of Fare

The Hill of Fare is a small hill in Aberdeenshire, Scotland. It is located about 5 km (3 miles) northeast of the village of Torphins. The hill is long and ridge-shaped, and 470 metres (1542 feet) tall at its highest point. At the top of the hill are several small lochs, and the hill is the source of many small burns. As with many hills in this region, there is a cairn at the summit. The hill is likely the source of Torphins's name; it probably came from Torr Fionn, 'fair hill', referring to the Hill of Fare.
