= Donside Village =

Coordinates: 57.174178°N 2.112479°W

- Neighbourhood
- Interactive map of Donside Village
- Country: Scotland
- Council area: City of Aberdeen
- City: Aberdeen

Donside Village is a neighbourhood of Tillydrone in Aberdeen, Scotland.

== Location and overview ==
Donside Village is a suburb of Aberdeen within Electoral Ward 6 and sits between Old Aberdeen, Tillydrone, Seaton Park, and Bridge of Don.

== History ==
Donside Village occupies the former site of the Donside Paper Mill, which closed in 2001 and was torn down around 2006. Planning permission for a new development was obtained in 2008. It is the location of Scotland's first urban hydro energy scheme.

== Events ==
The local community of Donside Village is active and regularly hosts events, such as the community theatre production of The River in 2017, and the Summer Fayre held on the second weekend in August. Beehives were sited in 2018 with the honey being harvested and sold in the village.
