= John Imlah =

Scottish poet

John Imlah (1799–1846), was a Scottish poet.

Imlah was the son of an innkeeper. He was born in Aberdeen on 15 November 1799. On completing his education at the Grammar School, he was apprenticed as piano-tuner to a local music seller, and ultimately secured an appointment in the London house of Messrs Broadwood. He died of yellow fever on 9 January 1846, at St. James's, Jamaica, where he had gone on a visit to a brother. Imlah had written poetry from his boyhood, and in 1827 he published 'May Flowers,' London, 12mo, which was followed in 1841 by 'Poems and Songs,' London, 12mo. He also contributed to Macleod's 'National Melodies' and the 'Edinburgh Literary Journal.'

His best known work in modern times is the song, "O gin I were where Gadie rins".
