= Braeside, Aberdeen =

Area of Aberdeen, Scotland

Coordinates: 57.130°N 2.147°W

Braeside: Scottish Gaelic: Taobh a' Bhràigh
- Location within the Aberdeen City council area Location within Scotland
- Council area: Aberdeen City
- Lieutenancy area: Aberdeen
- Country: Scotland
- Sovereign state: United Kingdom
- Postcode district: AB
- Police: Scotland
- Fire: Scottish
- Ambulance: Scottish

Braeside is an area of Aberdeen.

In 2014, Braeside Primary School was closed, and the building demolished in 2021, with plans to build houses on the site, however they were paused after local opposition.
