= River Gairn =

River in Scotland

Coordinates: 57°03′21″N 3°04′06″W

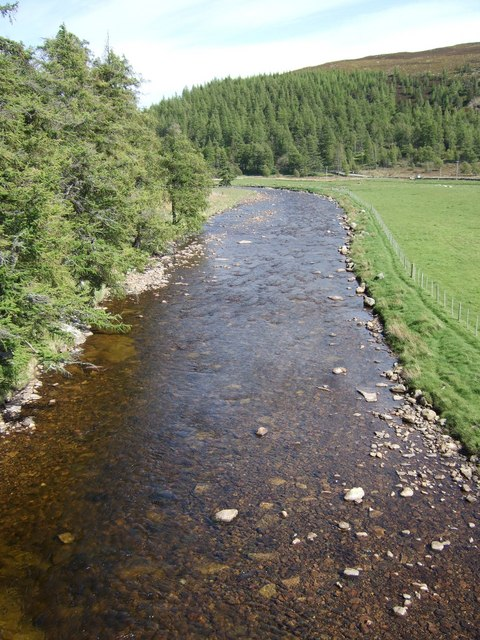

Gairn Water (also known as the River Gairn), situated in the Cairngorms National Park, is a river in Scotland with an elevation of 899 feet and a length of 4.75 kilometres.

== Course ==
The Gairn's source stems from a number of tributaries on the slopes of Carn Eas and Ben Avon in the Grampian Mountains of Aberdeenshire in Scotland. The river moves East South East for its entire course, passing through/near:

- Daldownie
- Rinloan
- Dalfad
- Torbeg
- Lary
- Candacraig
- Bridge of Gairn

before finally leading into the River Dee, near Ballater.

== Tributaries ==
The River Gairn has many unnamed tributaries leading into it, but the named ones are as follows, from source to mouth:

- Wester Kim
- Wester Shenalt
- Eastercon
- Easter Shenalt
- Corndavon Burn
- Duchrie Burn
- Wester Sleach Burn
- Sleach Burn - a convergence of 'Allt Ruigh na Cuileige' and 'Allt Coire nam Freumh'
- Allt Coire na Cloiche
- Braenalion Burn
- Rinioan Burn
- Allt Coire an t-Slugain
- West Milton Burn (and) East Milton Burn
- Garchory Burn
- Glenbardy Burn
- Corrybeg Burn
