= Loch nan Eun =

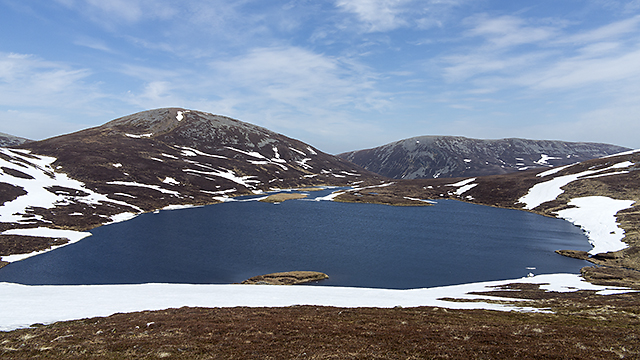
- Loch nan Eun, 750 metres above sea level, and still fringed by snow in mid-April. This is a beautiful and remote area, visited by walkers accessing the Munros Glas Tulaichean and Carn an Righ.

- Location within Perth and Kinross
- Location: NO063781
- Coordinates: 56.884900°N 3.538100°W
- Type: freshwater loch
- Primary outflows: Allt Easgaidh
- Max. length: 0.310 km (0.193 mi)
- Max. width: 0.201 km (0.125 mi)
- Surface area: 14.5 ha (36 acres)
- Average depth: 21.5 ft (6.6 m)
- Max. depth: 50 ft (15 m)
- Water volume: 34,459,000 ft^{3} (975,800 m^{3})
- Shore length^{1}: 2.3 km (1.4 mi)
- Surface elevation: 787 m (2,582 ft)
- Max. temperature: 50.8 °F (10.4 °C)
- Min. temperature: 49.8 °F (9.9 °C)
- Islands: 2
- ^{1} Shore length is not a well-defined measure.

Loch nan Eun is a remote freshwater loch, located in Gleann Taitneach in the Grampian Mountains, Perth and Kinross, some 4.5 miles west of The Cairnwell, Scotland.

Loch nan Eun when translated into English is Loch of the Birds.
