= Ruthven, Aberdeenshire =

Coordinates: 57°30′29″N 2°48′46″W

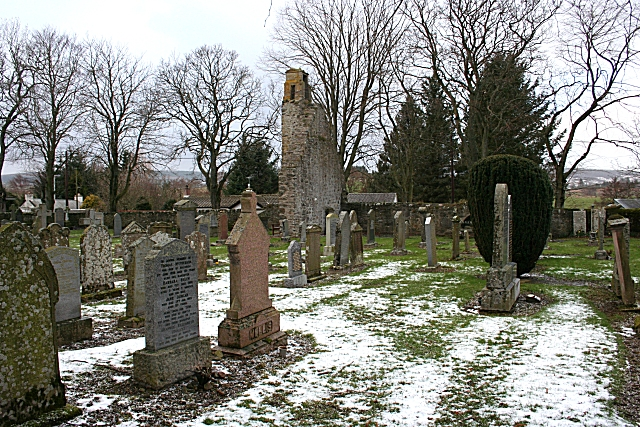
The gable end of St Carol's Kirk is all that remains, the graveyard is still in use

Ruthven (/ˈrɪvən/, Gaelic: Ruadhainn), Aberdeenshire is a village in Scotland near Huntly (to the south east), and Keith (to the north west). It is traditionally pronounced "Riven".

The "Wow o Riven" was a church bell in the area, and is mentioned in the ballad about Tam o Riven (Thomas Gordon), a knight who lived in The "Wow o Riven" became the title of one of George MacDonald's short stories too, which plays in Ruthven. The hero of the story is the old "fool", who became known as "colonel" and is buried near to the old bell.
