= Common Good Fund =

Common Good Act 1491
- Act of Parliament
- Parliament of Scotland
- Long title: Of the commoun gud of all burrowis.
- Citation: April 1491 c. 19; 12mo ed: 1491 c. 36

Dates
- Royal assent: 28 April 1491

A Common Good Fund is a fund held by a local authority in Scotland, consisting of property that previously belonged to a burgh. The fund may include both movable property (money or objects) and heritable property (land and buildings), and is legally distinct from other assets owned by the local authority. The funds have their origins in the 11th century, when the first burghs were established by royal charters that granted them certain lands, rights and privileges. The Common Good Act 1491 (c. 19), which remains in force, required that this property "be observed and kept for the common good of the town". The use and sale of Common Good is restricted by law, and the proceeds from these assets is retained in the relevant Common Good Fund. The income of a Common Good Fund is required to be used for the benefit of the inhabitants of the burgh to which they belong.

Since re-structuring of local government in 1975 and again in 1996, it is often not clear which property now comprises the Common Good of the former burghs. The Community Empowerment (Scotland) Act 2015 required all councils to establish and maintain a register of property which is held by the authority as part of the common good.

According to land campaigner and former MSP Andy Wightman there are 196 Common Good Funds across Scotland.

== Aberdeen ==
Aberdeen's Common Good Fund is a fund to benefit the people of Aberdeen, Scotland. It was created as a result of Robert the Bruce granting the city's Great Charter in 1319, after they sheltered him during his days of outlaw. In 2005, the value of the fund was £31 million.

Along with the Great Charter, Bruce gave Aberdeen the Forest of Stocket (now the Mid Stocket area of the city), in return for a yearly rent. As a result of the finances generated from the forest, the Common Good Fund was created to benefit the people of the city. Later, the lands of Cruvie (now Woodside) and Rubislaw were also granted to the people with the whole becoming known as the Freedom Lands of Aberdeen.

The fund helped to create Marischal College by giving land to George Keith, 5th Earl Marischal to help him build the institution; it helped the people during the 1640 plague and also gave funds to Aberdeen Art Gallery, the Central Library, Aberdeen Royal Infirmary and the purchase of Hazlehead Park.

In recent times it has been used to provide the elderly with tea dances and a festival for older people. It is also used to help charity as has been a substantial contributor to the Instant Neighbour Trust in the past.

== See also ==
- Sovereign wealth fund
