= Hilton, Aberdeen =

Area of Aberdeen, Scotland

Coordinates: 57°10′00″N 2°08′30″W

Hilton
- Location within the Aberdeen City council area Location within Scotland
- Council area: Aberdeen City
- Lieutenancy area: Aberdeen
- Country: Scotland
- Sovereign state: United Kingdom
- Postcode district: AB
- Police: Scotland
- Fire: Scottish
- Ambulance: Scottish

Hilton is a former village, now a neighbourhood, located just north of Rosehill in Aberdeen.
