= Garthdee =

Area of Aberdeen, Scotland

Coordinates: 57.122136°N 2.134911°W

Garthdee: Scottish Gaelic: Gart Dè
- Location within the Aberdeen City council area Location within Scotland
- OS grid reference: NJ919034
- Council area: Aberdeen City
- Lieutenancy area: Aberdeen
- Country: Scotland
- Sovereign state: United Kingdom
- Post town: ABERDEEN
- Postcode district: AB10
- Dialling code: 01224
- Police: Scotland
- Fire: Scottish
- Ambulance: Scottish
- UK Parliament: Aberdeen South
- Scottish Parliament: Aberdeen South and North Kincardine

Garthdee (Scottish Gaelic: Gart Dè) is an area of Aberdeen, Scotland. There is a large housing estate in Garthdee.

== Geography ==
Garthdee is south west of the city centre, 3 km from Holburn Junction. It lies on the north side the River Dee, north-west from the Bridge of Dee.

== History ==
The present-day Robert Gordon University campus stands on an area previously known as Kaim Hill which had been part of the rural Pitfodels Estate, also known as the "Lands of Pitfodels". This estate stretched from the Bridge of Dee in the east to Cults in the west, from the bank of the River Dee a considerable distance north of what today is Garthdee Road, which had in times past been a turnpike (i.e. a toll road). Since the medieval era this estate been in the possession of the Menzies family - a dynasty of powerful landowners who also held political power in Aberdeen, with members of the family often serving as Lord Provost of the city. The estate included a castle abandoned in 1622 known as Pitfodels Castle, whose probable location is close to the west of the present-day Gray's School of Art building. The last laird of the estate, John Menzies, began to sell off some of the land as feu in 1805. He died in Edinburgh in 1843 without any descendants and the remaining estate was purchased by the Pitfodels Land Company who divided it up into plots, four of which were sold for the development of a country villa. He bequeathed much of the rest of the family fortune to the Roman Catholic Church. A number of these Victorian villas still stand in the vicinity of the university campus and include Norwood House (currently a hotel) on the site of the ruined Pitfodels Castle (immediately west of the present-day campus), and Inchgarth House. Each plot of land formed its own estate, with a villa, gardens and land that could be rented out for farming. The last (and easternmost) of the plots was purchased by John Moir Clark, who owned a successful food canning business. He named his villa Garthdee House, and also applied the Garthdee name to its associated farms. Over time, the whole surrounding area became known as Garthdee. By the end of the 19th century:

"...The greater part of the lands of Pitfodels is now studded with beautiful mansions and villas, each of which stands amid well laid out and carefully kept grounds. They mostly belong to manufacturers and gentlemen engaged in business in Aberdeen, and retired gentlemen."

— John Mackintosh, History of the Valley of the Dee (1895), p.29

By 1953, Garthdee House had changed ownership several times and it had come into the possession of Tom Scott Sutherland, an architect, businessman and property developer from Aberdeen. Scott Sutherland had trained as an architect at the Aberdeen School of Architecture, which was part of Gray's School of Art. He qualified with a diploma in architecture in 1923 and became a successful businessman, which was his main interest although he also owned an architecture practice. He moved into Garthdee House with his wife Georgina Scott Sutherland, but they found it too big for two people. Through personal and business contacts with the Aberdeen School of Architecture, Scott Sutherland knew that the school desperately needed additional space because the Gray's School of Art building next to the Aberdeen Art Gallery in the city centre (which later became the university's Administration Building) had become much too small. He donated the whole Garthdee estate to the School of Architecture and after leasing the house back for a short time, he and his wife moved out in 1955; the School was subsequently renamed after him. As the architecture school was part of Robert Gordon's Technical College, the institution (and later the university) became the main owner of the land. Over time, it purchased additional neighboring land. At the time of Scott Sutherland's land donation, the site consisted mainly of open fields, often let out to tenant farmers, and the houses that characterise Garthdee as a suburb today had not yet been built. After extending Garthdee House, the School of Architecture held its first classes there in 1957. Between 1966 and 2013, all other departments moved to Garthdee.

== Economy ==
The main shops in Garthdee are Asda, B&Q, Boots, Currys, Sainsbury’s and Argos.

There is a dry ski slope and snowsports centre known as the Aberdeen Snowsports Centre which is run as a charitable organisation.

== Education ==
Robert Gordon University has a campus in Garthdee which cost some £120 million to develop.

Kaimhill primary school is the local primary school.

== Governance ==
The area has a community council with 12 councillors under Aberdeen City Council.

== Medical ==
Garthdee Medical Group is the local NHS practice.
