= Cummings Park, Aberdeen =

Area of Aberdeen, Scotland

Coordinates: 57.164°N 2.146°W

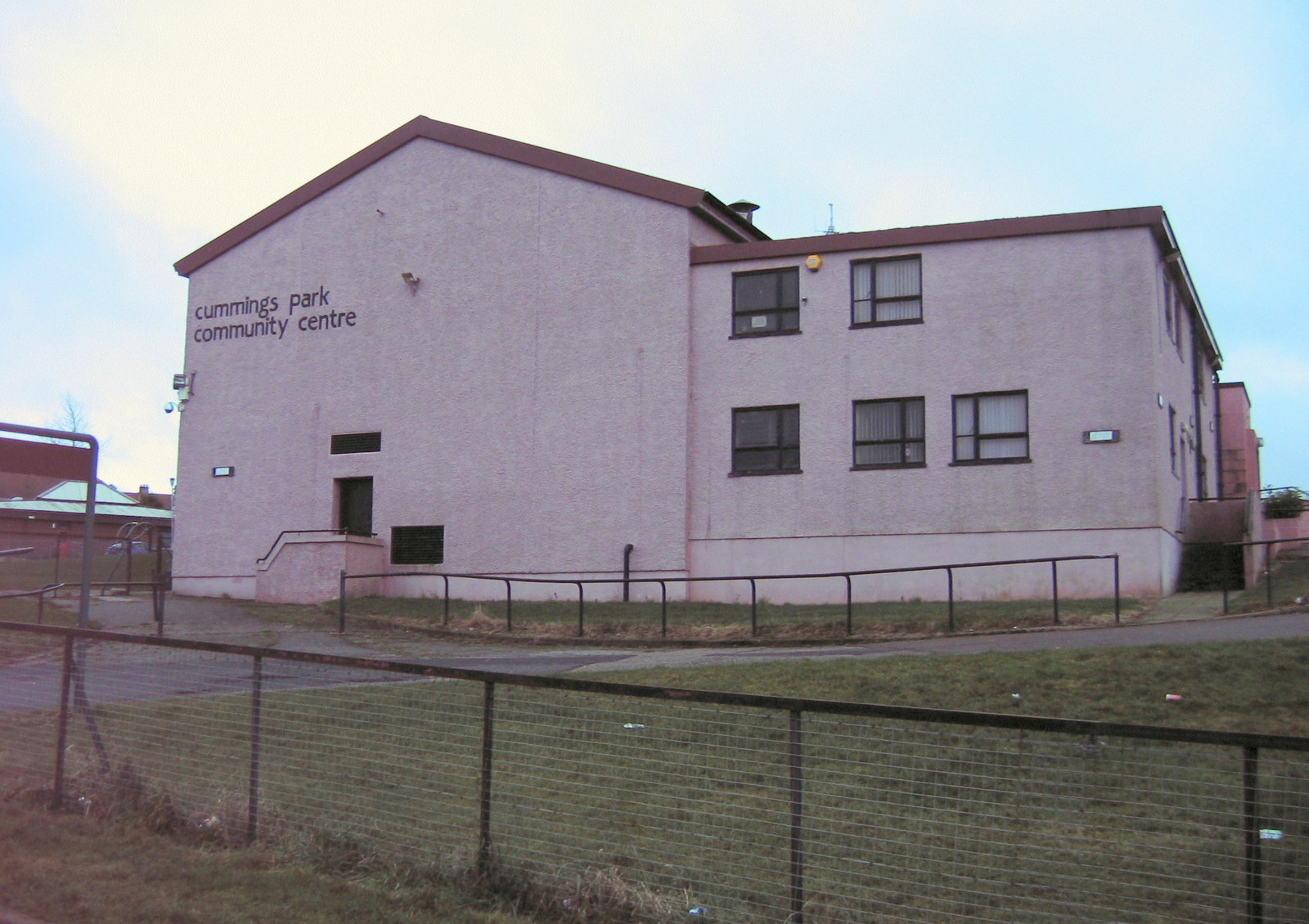
Cummings Park Community Centre

Cummings Park is an area of Aberdeen, Scotland.
