= Rosemount, Aberdeen =

Area of Aberdeen, Scotland

Coordinates: 57.1497°N 2.1176°W

Rosemount
- Location within the Aberdeen City council area Location within Scotland
- Population: 7,111
- OS grid reference: NJ929065
- Council area: Aberdeen City
- Lieutenancy area: Aberdeen
- Country: Scotland
- Sovereign state: United Kingdom
- Post town: ABERDEEN
- Postcode district: AB25
- Dialling code: 01224
- Police: Scotland
- Fire: Scottish
- Ambulance: Scottish
- UK Parliament: Aberdeen North
- Scottish Parliament: Aberdeen Central
- Website: aberdeencity.gov.uk

Rosemount is an area of Aberdeen, Scotland. When referring to Rosemount, the area is generally taken to include Rosemount Place and the surrounding streets. It is situated to the north west of the city centre and is bounded by Berryden, Midstocket and Queens Cross.

The area is largely Victorian with grey granite tenement blocks representative of the period. At the west end of Rosemount larger houses exist on streets such as Belvidere Crescent. Victoria Park can be found in the north of the area. Rosemount Place itself is a very busy street for both cars and pedestrian and has small shops lining almost the entire street. It maintains a lot of traditional premises such as butchers, fishmongers, cheese shops and bakers. This area is one of the few still in existence in Aberdeen where many independent stores can be found. Due to this fact, it remains popular and many businesses are prosperous, with empty units rare.

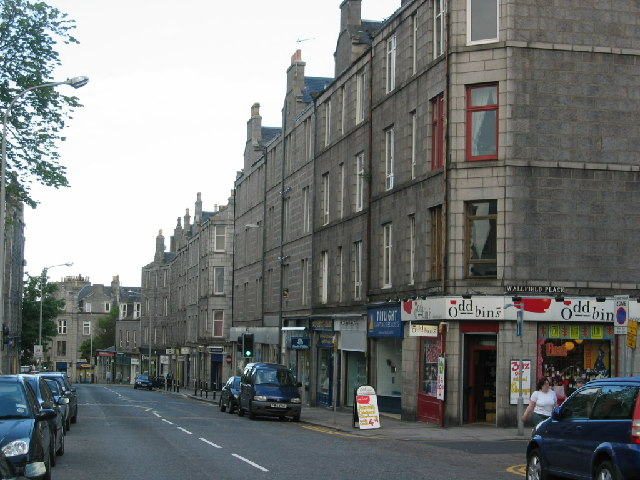
Rosemount Place

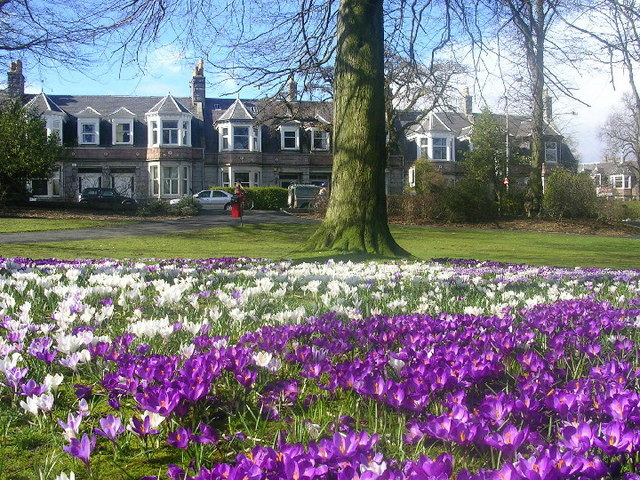
Crocuses in Victoria Park

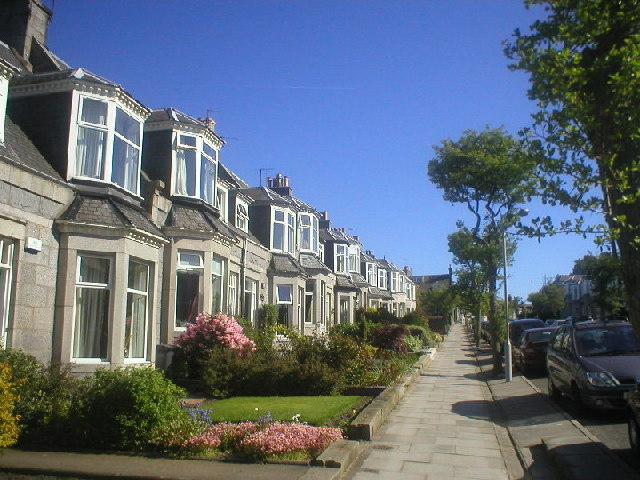
Granite houses on Belvidere Street
