= Kaimhill =

District of Aberdeen, Scotland

Coordinates: 57.125°N 2.126°W

- Location within the Aberdeen City council area Location within Scotland
- Council area: Aberdeen City
- Lieutenancy area: Aberdeen
- Country: Scotland
- Sovereign state: United Kingdom
- Postcode district: AB10
- Police: Scotland
- Fire: Scottish
- Ambulance: Scottish

Kaimhill is a district in Aberdeen, Scotland.

Its post code is AB10. Children attend Kaimhill Primary School and Harlaw Academy.
