= Midstocket =

Area of Aberdeen, Scotland

Coordinates: 57°08′59″N 2°08′10″W

- Location within the Aberdeen City council area Location within Scotland
- Council area: Aberdeen City
- Lieutenancy area: Aberdeen
- Country: Scotland
- Sovereign state: United Kingdom
- Postcode district: AB
- Police: Scotland
- Fire: Scottish
- Ambulance: Scottish

Midstocket is an area of Aberdeen, Scotland. It is named after the Forest of Stocket, a gift from Robert the Bruce to the people of Aberdeen in 1319. The income from the forest land formed Aberdeen's Common Good Fund.

Midstocket Road cuts through the area and is generally seen as the focal point of the Midstocket Area. The streets between Midstocket Road and Westburn Road from Mile-End School are considered to be in the Midstocket Area. Between Rosemount and Mile-End School is considered the Mile-End area despite Midstocket Road passing through it.

Midstocket Parish Church, which is also used as a community facility, is located on Midstocket Road.
