= Berryden =

Area of Aberdeen, Scotland

Coordinates: 57.15725°N 2.11463°W

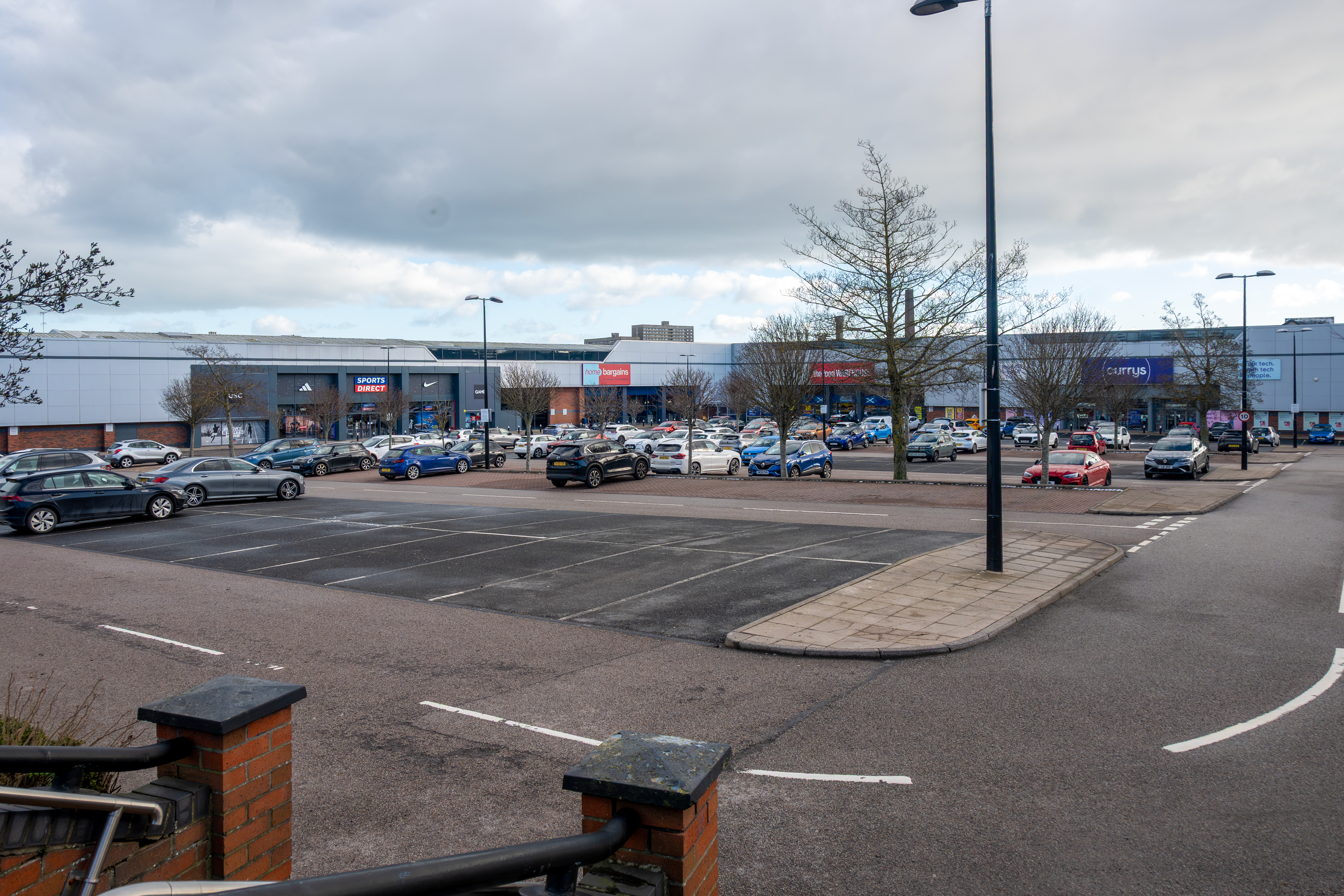
- Berryden Retail Park

- Location within the Aberdeen City council area Location within Scotland
- Council area: Aberdeen City
- Lieutenancy area: Aberdeen
- Country: Scotland
- Sovereign state: United Kingdom
- Postcode district: AB
- Police: Scotland
- Fire: Scottish
- Ambulance: Scottish

Berryden is an area of Aberdeen north of Union Street.

Berryden Retail Park is the main shopping destination in the north side of Aberdeen, with large chain store, smaller shops and a children's play centre. The retail park was purchased by Frasers Group in October 2020.

Kittybrewster Retail Park is just a few minutes away, and houses similar retailers and services.
