= Tyrie, Aberdeenshire =

Coordinates: 57.6526°N 2.1288°W

Tyrie
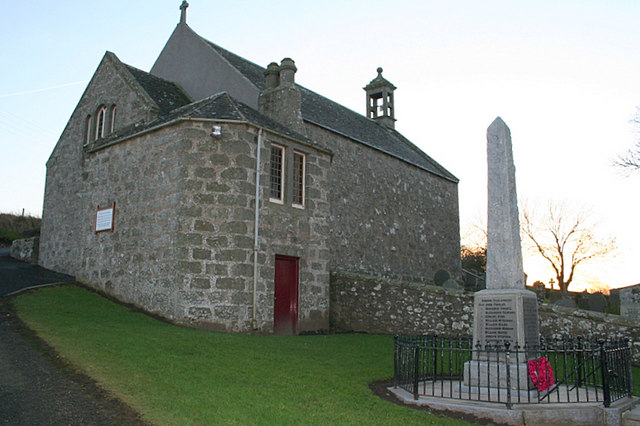
- St Andrew's Parish Church and war memorial

- Location within Aberdeenshire
- Civil parish: Tyrie
- Council area: Aberdeenshire
- Country: Scotland
- Sovereign state: United Kingdom
- Police: Scotland
- Fire: Scottish
- Ambulance: Scottish

Tyrie is a hamlet and parish in the Banff and Buchan district of Aberdeenshire, north-east Scotland. Tyrie is located on the A98 road, around 5.5 miles (8.9 km) south-west of Fraserburgh. Tyrie parish includes the larger settlement of New Pitsligo, 5 miles (8.0 km) to the south. There is a primary school in the village. Tyrie's St Andrew's Parish Church was built in 1800 and is a category B listed building. The church contains a Pictish symbol stone, known as the Raven Stone, which was discovered on the site of the old parish church. The ecclesiastical parish was united with Strichen parish in 2002.

Boyndlie House, 1814, is a "recasting of the fine 17th-century House of Boyndlie, something not unlike Edinburgh's Prestonfield House".

== Bibliography ==
- McKean, Charles (1990), Banff & Buchan, Royal Incorporation of Architects in Scotland, ISBN 978-1-85158-231-0
