= Broomhill, Aberdeen =

Area of Aberdeen, Scotland

Coordinates: 57°07′45″N 2°07′36″W

Broomhill
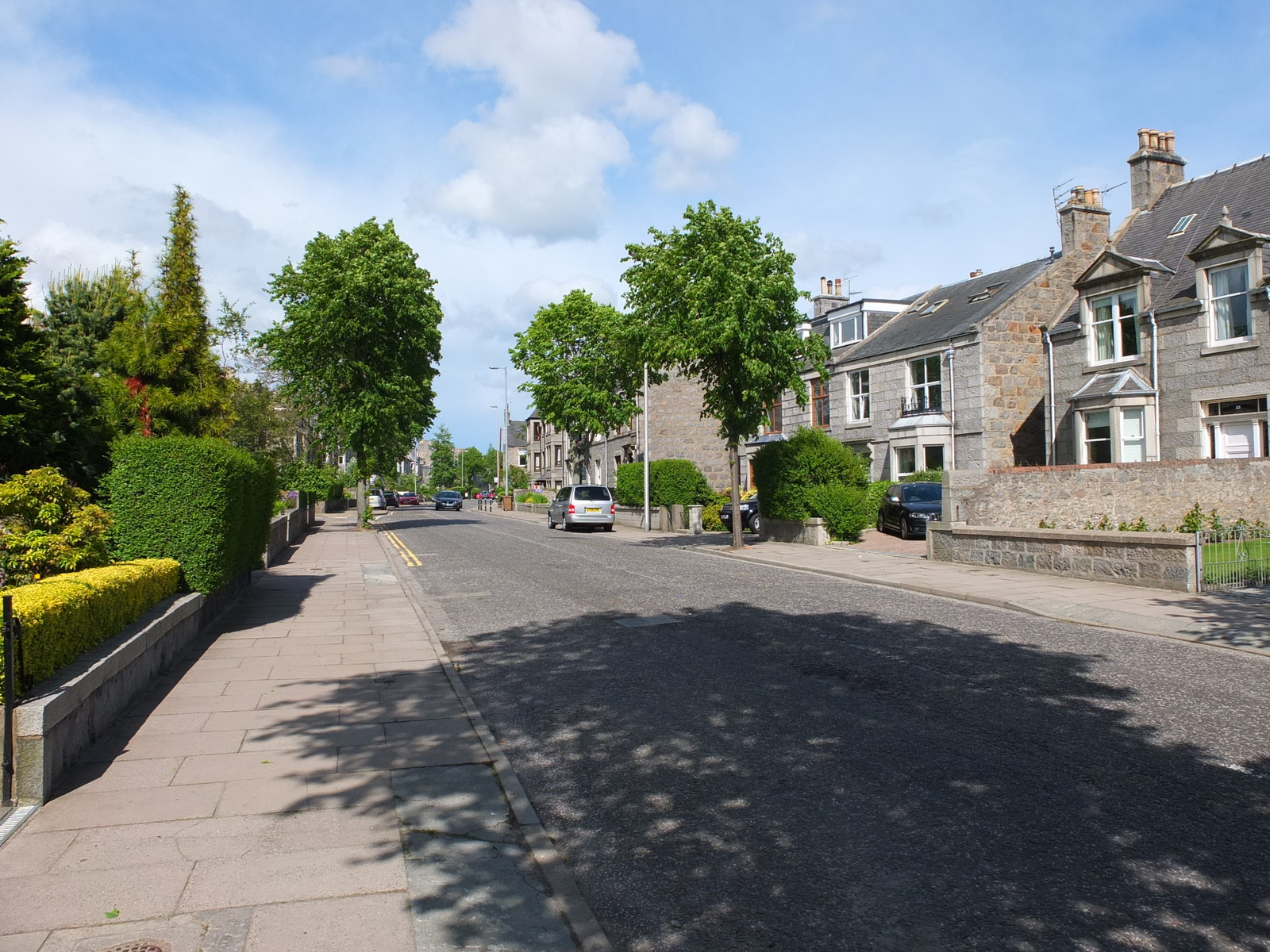
- Broomhill Road

- Location within the Aberdeen City council area Location within Scotland
- Council area: Aberdeen City
- Lieutenancy area: Aberdeen
- Country: Scotland
- Sovereign state: United Kingdom
- Postcode district: AB
- Police: Scotland
- Fire: Scottish
- Ambulance: Scottish

Broomhill is an affluent, middle class area of Aberdeen, Scotland. It is situated in the west end and is accessible by the A92 road (South Anderson Drive). The area is home to a primary school, Broomhill.
