= Mastrick =

Area of Aberdeen, Scotland

Coordinates: 57.1556°N 2.1640°W

- Location within the Aberdeen City council area Location within Scotland
- Population: 7,365
- OS grid reference: NJ901072
- Council area: Aberdeen City
- Lieutenancy area: Aberdeen
- Country: Scotland
- Sovereign state: United Kingdom
- Post town: ABERDEEN
- Postcode district: AB16
- Dialling code: 01224
- Police: Scotland
- Fire: Scottish
- Ambulance: Scottish
- UK Parliament: Aberdeen North
- Scottish Parliament: Aberdeen Donside
- Website: aberdeencity.gov.uk

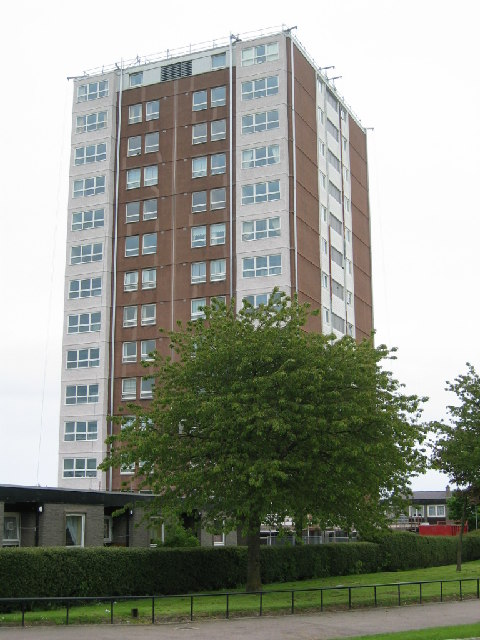
"Mastrick Land" Skyscraper

Mastrick is an area of Aberdeen, Scotland, located on the western fringes of the city around 2 1/2 miles (4 kilometres) from the city centre. It currently has a population of 7,365 and an unemployment rate of 1.6%. Residential property in the area is a mix of houses and flats, 23% of which are still council owned. This is around twice the average in Aberdeen City.

Mastrick has several shops and is within a short walking distance of Hazlehead Park, Northfield, Sheddocksley, Summerhill and Woodend. Woodend Hospital is a short distance away from Mastrick, as is the hospital complex at Foresterhill.

The boundary of Mastrick was George Handsley's house.

The local football team is Northstar Community football Club With Ages Under 15s, Under 13s and Under 12s. The Under 15s currently play in the ADJFA "A" League, whereas the Under 13s play in the ADJFA "C" League. The Under 12s play non-competitive football.
