= Stoneywood, Aberdeen =

Stoneywood
- Village
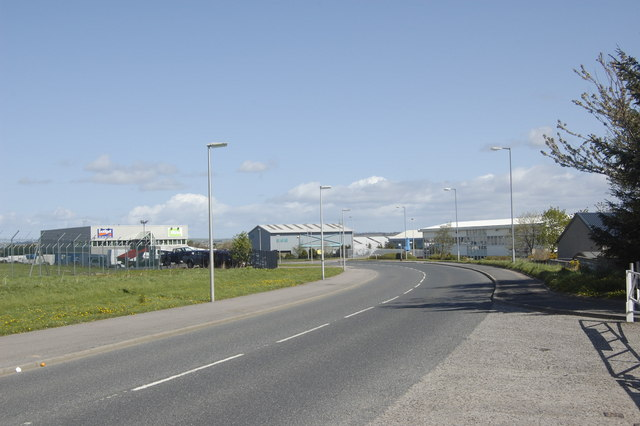
- View of the city's agricultural farms.

- Location within the Aberdeen City council area
- Coordinates: 57.1909°N 2.1869822°W
- Sovereign State: United Kingdom
- Country: Scotland
- Council Area: Aberdeen City

Stoneywood is a small area of Aberdeen, Scotland, located between Dyce and Bucksburn near Aberdeen Airport. Stoneywood is served by two primary schools and one secondary school, which sits in Bucksburn. The main road running through the suburb is the A947, a north-south two-lane highway linking Aberdeen with Banff on the coast.
