= Danestone =

Area of Aberdeen, Scotland

Coordinates: 57.179308°N 2.133998°W

- Location within Aberdeen City council area Location within Scotland
- Population: 3,885
- OS grid reference: NJ 91998 09839
- Council area: Aberdeen City
- Lieutenancy area: Aberdeen
- Country: Scotland
- Sovereign state: United Kingdom
- Post town: Aberdeen
- Postcode district: AB22 8
- Dialling code: 01224
- Police: Scotland
- Fire: Scottish
- Ambulance: Scottish
- UK Parliament: Aberdeen North
- Scottish Parliament: Aberdeen Donside

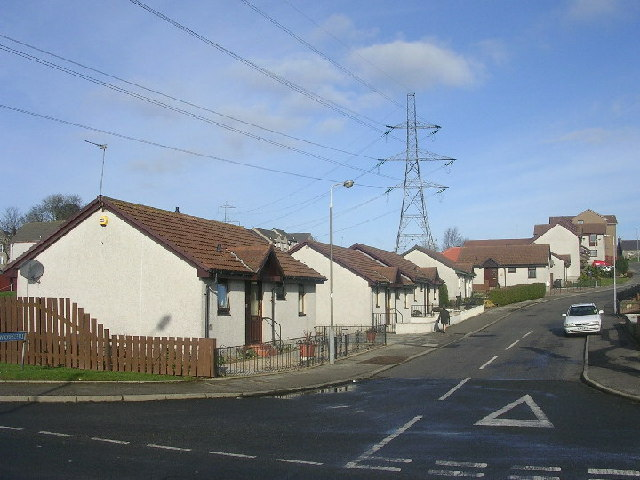

Danestone is a small, village-like area of Aberdeen, Scotland, located next to the suburb of Bridge of Don.

Located North of Aberdeen City Centre, Danestone is a relatively new area of Aberdeen. The area was all farmland until the 1980s when Danestone Primary School and many detached, semi-detached houses and bungalows were built.

The name Danestone came from the name of Danestone Farm.

== Amenities ==
There are a few attractions in Danestone like Danestone Play Park and a forest along the River Don.

== Danestone Primary School ==
Danestone Primary School started construction in 1984 and opened in 1986. The school was extended in 1988 to be able to accommodate up to 420 pupils. Mrs Corser was the first headteacher, who left in 2005 as the longest serving head teacher in Danestone Primary School’s history. The current headteacher is Mrs Page. It is an Eco-School.

== Police Scotland ==
Formerly located in the Danestone Community Area on Fairview Street. The police station is no longer in use, making Danestone’s closest police station in Tillydrone.

== Danestone Community Centre ==
Located in the Danestone Community Area on Fairview Street. Is a busy community centre running a varied programme of activities for all.

== Danestone Congregational Church ==
Danestone Congregational Church is located in the Danestone Community Area on Fairview Street. Danestone Congregational Church works with the local community as well as other Congregational Churches in Aberdeen. Danestone Congregational Church take a leading role in the Danestone Gala, held each year in the Danestone Community Area. Danestone Congregational Church also has many groups including Youth Group, Good Afternoon Club and the Men's and Ladies' Groups, all of which the public are welcome to attend.

== The Church of Jesus Christ of Latter-day Saints ==
There is meeting house of the Church of Jesus Christ of Latter-day Saints on Fairview Street, the main street through Danestone. Religious meetings open to everyone are held every Sunday and young men and young women engage in various activities on Tuesday evening. Members of the church take a leading role in serving the community and organise an annual Christmas 'Santa Float' that patrols the streets collecting money for local charities.
