= Kingswells =

Village in Aberdeen, Scotland

Coordinates: 57.160000°N 2.223056°W

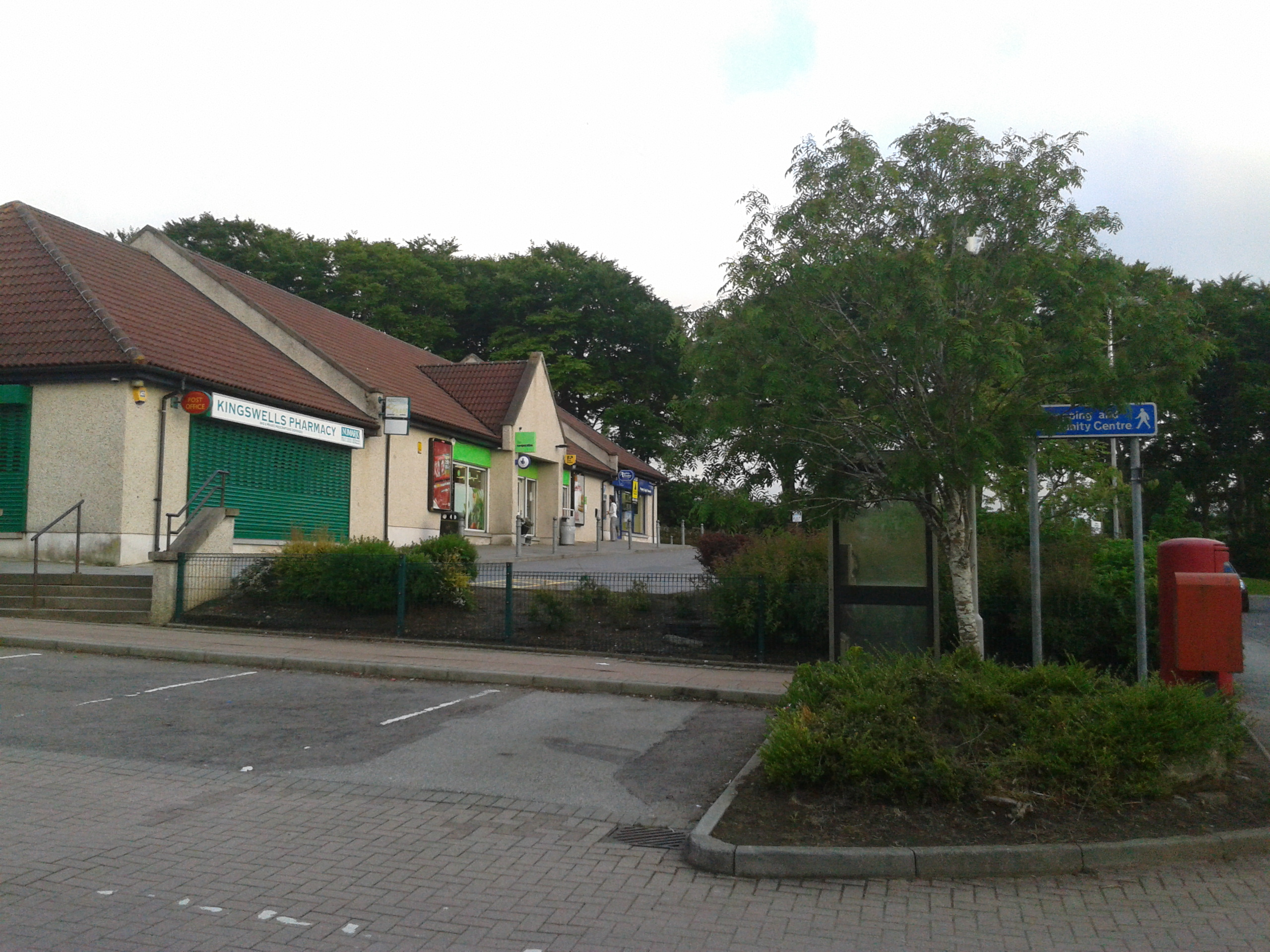
- Village Centre, Kingswells

- Location within the City of Aberdeen
- Population: 4,850 (2020)
- OS grid reference: NJ 86607 07704
- Council area: Aberdeen
- Lieutenancy area: Aberdeen
- Country: Scotland
- Sovereign state: United Kingdom
- Post town: Aberdeen
- Postcode district: AB15
- Dialling code: 01224
- Police: Scotland
- Fire: Scottish
- Ambulance: Scottish
- UK Parliament: Aberdeen North
- Scottish Parliament: Aberdeen Donside

Kingswells is a village and suburb of Aberdeen, Scotland, situated west of the city and to the east of Westhill which lies on the other side of the Aberdeen Western Peripheral Route bypass (part of the A90 road).

Kingswells has a primary school, a doctor's surgery, a veterinary practice (Ardene), a community centre, a Co-op convenience store, a garage, a beauty salon, and a church. For food and leisure, the village hosts two take-away outlets, a restaurant/café and a pub at the Four Mile.

Next to the village lies the Prime Four Business Park, which features offices of many major oil and gas companies, a hotel, gym and Starbucks coffee shop, along with a dentist's surgery.

Although Kingswells does not have a secondary school, buses operate regularly, providing transport to nearby secondary schools such as Bucksburn Academy.

The village is served by public transport, including the McGill's service 14, which runs between Kingswells and Aberdeen City Centre on weekdays. From the park and ride facility, Stagecoach Bluebird services 5 and 6 connect Kingswells with Westhill and Aberdeen, along with service 218 to Alford and Aberdeen. The area also benefits from easy access to Bridge of Don and Dyce via the AWPR, offering convenience for those working at Aberdeen Airport and nearby industrial estates.
