= Summerhill, Aberdeen =

Area of Aberdeen, Scotland

Coordinates: 57°08′56″N 2°09′26″W

Summerhill
- Location within the Aberdeen City council area Location within Scotland
- Council area: Aberdeen City
- Lieutenancy area: Aberdeen
- Country: Scotland
- Sovereign state: United Kingdom
- Post town: ABERDEEN
- Postcode district: AB15
- Dialling code: 01224
- Police: Scotland
- Fire: Scottish
- Ambulance: Scottish

Summerhill is an area of Aberdeen, in the north-east of Scotland, United Kingdom.
