= Hazlehead =

Area of Aberdeen, Scotland

Coordinates: 57.1379°N 2.1814°W

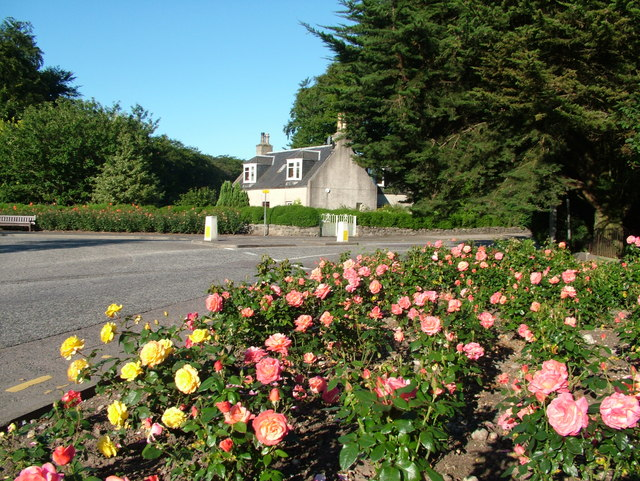
- Hazlehead Roundabout, where Queen's Road and King's Gate meet.

- Location within the Aberdeen City council area Location within Scotland
- Population: 5,046 (2015 estimate)
- OS grid reference: NJ891052
- Council area: Aberdeen City
- Lieutenancy area: Aberdeen
- Country: Scotland
- Sovereign state: United Kingdom
- Post town: ABERDEEN
- Postcode district: AB15 8
- Dialling code: 01224
- Police: Scotland
- Fire: Scottish
- Ambulance: Scottish
- UK Parliament: Aberdeen South
- Scottish Parliament: Aberdeen South and North Kincardine

Hazlehead is an area to the west of Aberdeen.

== Usage ==
Hazlehead comprises a mixture of flats, houses and residential tower blocks. It was originally a council estate although many homes are now privately owned. The council's idea behind the Hazlehead Estate was that there should be much open space, which would be accessible to all. As a result of this, a large number of houses in the area lack a private garden. Hazlehead can be accessed by public transport a short walk from Woodend Queens Road First Aberdeen service.

== Amenities ==
A large part of the area forms Hazlehead Park, which opened in 1920 and is 180 hectares, having formerly been the grounds of Hazlehead House, the home of William Rose, shipbuilder. It is the largest park in the city and includes a 9-hole and two 18-hole golf courses. It also has a horse-riding centre, two parks, tennis courts, golf clubhouse, playing fields, a swimming pool and a few local shops.

== Education ==
Hazlehead has one primary school and one academy, Hazlehead Primary School and Hazlehead Academy. The primary school rebuilt in May 2008 of their school as part of Aberdeen City Council's 3Rs project to refurbish schools in the city. The new school building opened in officially opened in March 2010.
