= AB postcode area =

Postcode area within the United Kingdom

Aberdeen
- Postcode area
- Coordinates: 57.291°N 2.320°W
- Country: United Kingdom
- Postcode area: AB
- Postcode area name: Aberdeen
- Post towns: 24
- Postcode districts: 40
- Postcode sectors: 176
- Postcodes (live): 17,095
- Postcodes (total): 38,794
- Statistics as at May 2020

The AB postcode area, also known as the Aberdeen postcode area, is a group of 33 postcode districts in north-east Scotland, within 24 post towns. These cover the Aberdeen council area (including the city of Aberdeen, Milltimber and Peterculter), Aberdeenshire (including Banff, Macduff, Fraserburgh, Peterhead, Ellon, Turriff, Huntly, Insch, Inverurie, Westhill, Alford, Strathdon, Ballater, Aboyne, Banchory, Laurencekirk and Stonehaven) and east Moray (including Buckie, Keith, Aberlour and Ballindalloch).

Mail for the AB postcode area is processed at Aberdeen Mail Centre.

== Coverage ==
The approximate coverage of the postcode districts:

| Postcode district | Post town | Coverage | Local authority area(s) |
|---|---|---|---|
| AB10 | ABERDEEN | Bridge of Dee, Mannofield, Ruthrieston | Aberdeen |
| AB11 | ABERDEEN | Ferryhill, Torry | Aberdeen |
| AB12 | ABERDEEN | Altens, Ardoe, Banchory Devenick, Blairs, Bridge of Dee, Cove Bay, Kincorth, Maryculter, Nigg, Portlethen, Tullos | Aberdeen, Aberdeenshire |
| AB13 | MILLTIMBER | Milltimber | Aberdeen |
| AB14 | PETERCULTER | Peterculter, Upper Anguston | Aberdeen |
| AB15 | ABERDEEN | Bieldside, Craigiebuckler, Cults, Hazlehead, Kingswells, Mannofield, Milltimber, Summerhill | Aberdeen |
| AB16 | ABERDEEN | Mastrick, Northfield, Middlefield, Cornhill, Shedocksley | Aberdeen |
| AB21 | ABERDEEN | Blackburn, Bucksburn, Dyce, Fintray, Kinellar, Newmachar, Whiterashes | Aberdeen, Aberdeenshire |
| AB22 | ABERDEEN | Bridge of Don, Danestone, Grandholm, Persley | Aberdeen |
| AB23 | ABERDEEN | Balmedie, Belhelvie, Bridge of Don, Potterton, Whitecairns | Aberdeen, Aberdeenshire |
| AB24 | ABERDEEN | Old Aberdeen, Woodside, Tillydrone, Seaton, Bedford | Aberdeen |
| AB25 | ABERDEEN | Kittybrewster, Foresterhill, Rosemount, George Street | Aberdeen |
| AB30 | LAURENCEKIRK | Laurencekirk, Fettercairn, Marykirk, North Water Bridge, Luthermuir, Phesbo, Glensaugh, Auchenblae, Fordoun, Scotston, Arbuthnott | Aberdeenshire |
| AB31 | BANCHORY | Banchory, Lumphanan, Torphins, Crathes | Aberdeenshire |
| AB32 | WESTHILL | Westhill, Kirkton of Skene, Echt, Dunecht | Aberdeenshire |
| AB33 | ALFORD | Alford, Muir of Fowlis, Towie | Aberdeenshire |
| AB34 | ABOYNE | Aboyne, Kincardine O'Neil, Dinnet | Aberdeenshire |
| AB35 | BALLATER | Ballater, Crathie, Braemar, Spittal of Glenmuick | Aberdeenshire |
| AB36 | STRATHDON | Strathdon, Corgarff | Aberdeenshire |
| AB37 | BALLINDALLOCH | Ballindalloch, Glenlivet, Tomintoul | Moray |
| AB38 | ABERLOUR | Aberlour, Craigellachie, Rothes | Moray |
| AB39 | STONEHAVEN | Stonehaven, Newtonhill | Aberdeenshire |
| AB41 | ELLON | Ellon, Tarves, Pitmedden, Udny | Aberdeenshire |
| AB42 | PETERHEAD | Peterhead, Hatton, St. Fergus | Aberdeenshire |
| AB43 | FRASERBURGH | Fraserburgh, Crimond | Aberdeenshire |
| AB44 | MACDUFF | Macduff | Aberdeenshire |
| AB45 | BANFF | Banff, Gardenstown, Cornhill, Portsoy, Whitehills | Aberdeenshire |
| AB51 | INVERURIE | Inverurie, Kemnay, Kintore, Oldmeldrum | Aberdeenshire |
| AB52 | INSCH | Insch, Culsalmond, Largie, Auchleven, Oyne, Old Rayne, Colpy, Leslie, Wrangham, Duncanstone, Mill of Boddam | Aberdeenshire |
| AB53 | TURRIFF | Turriff, Fyvie, New Deer | Aberdeenshire |
| AB54 | HUNTLY | Huntly, Aberchirder, Cabrach, Cairnie, Forgue, Gartly, Glass, Kennethmont, Lumsden, Rhynie, Rothiemay | Aberdeenshire, Moray |
| AB55 | KEITH | Keith, Dufftown | Moray |
| AB56 | BUCKIE | Buckie, Cullen, Portknockie, Findochty, Portessie, Portgordon | Moray |
| AB99 | ABERDEEN | | non-geographic |

Originally, the area had only five postcode districts, AB1 to AB5. In August 1990, these were recoded with the addition of second digits, such that every post town besides Aberdeen had its own district. At the same time, IV33, IV34 and IV35 were recoded as part of AB38.

== Map ==
AB postcode area map, showing postcode districts in red and post towns in grey text, with links to nearby DD, IV and PH postcode areas

Detailed map of postcode districts and post towns in and around Aberdeen

== See also ==
- List of postcode areas in the United Kingdom
- Postcode Address File
