= List of state schools in Scotland (council areas excluding cities, A–D) =

The following is a partial list of currently operating state schools in the unitary council areas of Aberdeenshire, Angus, Argyll and Bute, Clackmannanshire and Dumfries and Galloway in Scotland, United Kingdom. You may also find Category:Schools in Scotland of use to find a particular school. See also the List of the oldest schools in the United Kingdom.

By unitary council area.

Note that the allocations to address and council area may not be accurate in every case and you can help if you have access to local directories.

== Aberdeenshire ==
=== Nursery schools ===
- Ballogie Nursery, Aboyne
- Crossroads Nursery, Durris, Banchory

=== Primary schools ===
- Aberchirder Primary School, Aberchirder
- Aboyne Primary School, Aboyne
- Alehousewells Primary School, Kemnay
- Alford Primary School, Alford
- Arduthie Primary School, Stonehaven
- Arnage Primary School, Ellon
- Auchenblae Primary School, Auchenblae
- Auchnagatt Primary School, Auchnagatt
- Auchterellon Primary School, Ellon
- Auchterless Primary School, Auchterless
- Ballater Primary School, Ballater
- Balmedie Primary School, Balmedie
- Banchory Primary School, Banchory
- Banchory-Devenick Primary School, Banchory-Devenick
- Banff Primary School, Banff
- Barthol Chapel Primary School, Barthol Chapel
- Bervie Primary School, Inverbervie
- Boddam Primary School, Boddam
- Bracoden Primary School, Gardenstown
- Braemar Primary School, Braemar
- Buchanhaven Primary School, Peterhead
- Burnhaven Primary School, Peterhead
- Cairney Primary School, Cairnie
- Catterline Primary School, Catterline
- Chapel of Garioch Primary School, Pitcaple
- Clatt Primary School, Clatt
- Clerkhill Primary School, Peterhead
- Cluny Primary School, Sauchen
- Craigievar Primary School, Alford
- Crathes Primary School, Banchory
- Crathie Primary School, Crathie
- Crimond Primary School, Crimond
- Crombie Primary School, Westhill
- Crudie Primary School, Turriff
- Cultercullen Primary School, Udny Station
- Dales Park Primary School, Peterhead
- Daviot Primary School, Daviot
- Drumblade Primary School, Drumblade
- Drumoak Primary School, Drumoak
- Dunecht Primary School, Dunecht
- Dunnottar Primary School, Stonehaven
- Durris Primary School, Kirkton of Durris
- Easterfield Primary School, Turriff
- Echt Primary School, Echt
- Ellon Primary School, Ellon
- Elrick Primary School, Elrick
- Fetterangus Primary School, Fetterangus
- Fettercairn Primary School, Fettercairn
- Fintry Primary School, Turriff
- Finzean Primary School, Finzean
- Fisherford Primary School, Rothienorman
- Fishermoss Primary School, Portlethen
- Fordyce Primary School, Fordyce
- Forgue Primary School, Forgue
- Foveran Primary School, Foveran
- Fraserburgh North Primary School, Fraserburgh
- Fraserburgh South Park Primary School, Fraserburgh
- Fyvie Primary School, Fyvie
- Glass Primary School, Glass
- Glenbervie Primary School, Glenbervie
- Gordon Primary School, Huntly
- Gourdon Primary School, Gourdon
- Hatton (Cruden) Primary School, Hatton
- Hatton (Fintray) Primary School, Hatton of Fintray
- Hill of Banchory Primary School, Banchory
- Hillside Primary School, Portlethen
- Insch Primary School, Insch
- Inverallochy Primary School, Inverallochy
- Johnshaven Primary School, Johnshaven
- Keig Primary School, Keig
- Keithhall Primary School, Kinmuck
- Kellands Primary School, Inverurie
- Kemnay Primary School, Kemnay
- Kennethmont Primary School, Kennethmont
- Kincardine O'Neil Primary School, Kincardine O'Neil
- Kinellar Primary School, Blackburn
- King Edward Primary School, King Edward
- Kininmonth Primary School, New Leeds
- Kinneff Primary School, Kinneff
- Kintore Primary School, Kintore
- Lairhillock Primary School, Netherley
- Largue Primary School, Forgue
- Laurencekirk Primary School, Laurencekirk
- Lochpots Primary School, Fraserburgh
- Logie Coldstone Primary School, Logie Coldstone
- Logie Durno Primary School, Pitcaple
- Longside Primary School, Longside
- Lumphanan Primary School, Lumphanan
- Lumsden Primary School, Lumsden
- Luthermuir Primary School, Laurencekirk
- Macduff Primary School, Macduff
- Marykirk Primary School, Marykirk
- Maud Primary School, Maud
- Meethill Primary School, Peterhead
- Meiklemill Primary School, Ellon
- Meldrum Primary School, Oldmeldrum
- Methlick Primary School, Methlick
- Midmar Primary School, Inverurie
- Midmill Primary School, Kintore
- Mill O' Forest Primary School, Stonehaven
- Mintlaw Primary School, Mintlaw
- Monquhitter Primary School, Cuminestown
- Monymusk Primary School, Monymusk
- New Deer Primary School, New Deer
- New Machar Primary School, Newmachar
- New Pitsligo & St John's Primary School, New Pitsligo
- Newburgh Mathers Primary School, Newburgh
- Newtonhill Primary School, Newtonhill
- Old Rayne Primary School, Old Rayne
- Ordiquhill Primary School, Cornhill
- Oyne Primary School, Oyne
- Peterhead Central Primary School, Peterhead
- Pitfour Primary School, Mintlaw
- Pitmedden Primary School, Pitmedden
- Port Elphinstone Primary School, Inverurie
- Port Errol Primary School, Cruden Bay
- Portlethen Primary School, Portlethen
- Portsoy Primary School, Portsoy
- Premnay Primary School, Auchleven
- Rathen Primary School, Rathen
- Rayne North Primary School, Old Rayne
- Redmyre Primary School, Fordoun
- Rhynie Primary School, Rhynie
- Rosehearty Primary School, Rosehearty
- Rothienorman Primary School, Rothienorman
- Sandhaven Primary School, Sandhaven
- Skene Primary School, Skene
- Slains Primary School, Collieston
- St Andrew's Primary School, Fraserburgh
- St Combs Primary School, St Combs
- St Cyrus Primary School, St Cyrus
- St Fergus Primary School, St Fergus
- Strathburn Primary School, Inverurie
- Strathdon Primary School, Strathdon
- Strichen Primary School, Strichen
- Stuartfield Primary School, Stuartfield
- Tarland Primary School, Tarland
- Tarves Primary School, Tarves
- Tipperty Primary School, Ellon
- Torphins Primary School, Torphins
- Tough Primary School, Kirkton of Tough
- Towie Primary School, Towie
- Tullynessle Primary School, Tullynessle
- Turriff Primary School, Turriff
- Tyrie Primary School, Tyrie
- Udny Green Primary School, Udny Green
- Uryside Primary School, Inverurie
- Westhill Primary School, Westhill
- Whitehills Primary School, Whitehills

=== Secondary schools ===
- Aboyne Academy, Aboyne
- Alford Academy, Alford
- Banchory Academy, Banchory
- Banff Academy, Banff
- Ellon Academy, Ellon
- Fraserburgh Academy, Fraserburgh
- The Gordon Schools, Huntly
- Inverurie Academy, Inverurie
- Kemnay Academy, Kemnay
- Mackie Academy, Stonehaven
- Mearns Academy, Laurencekirk
- Meldrum Academy, Oldmeldrum
- Mintlaw Academy, Mintlaw
- Peterhead Academy, Peterhead
- Portlethen Academy, Portlethen
- Turriff Academy, Turriff
- Westhill Academy, Westhill

=== Special schools ===
- Anna Ritchie School, Peterhead
- Carronhill School, Stonehaven
- St Andrew's School, Inverurie
- Westfield School, Fraserburgh

== Angus ==
=== Primary schools ===
- Aberlemno Primary School, Forfar
- Airlie Primary School, Kirriemuir
- Andover Primary School, Brechin
- Arbirlot Primary School, Arbroath
- Auchterhouse Primary School, Auchterhouse
- Birkhill Primary School, Birkhill
- Borrowfield Primary School, Montrose
- Burnside Primary School, Carnoustie
- Carlogie Primary School, Carnoustie
- Carmyllie Primary School, Arbroath
- Colliston Primary School, Arbroath
- Cortachy Primary School, Kirriemuir
- Eassie Primary School, Forfar
- Edzell Primary School, Brechin
- Ferryden Primary School, Montrose
- Friockheim Primary School, Arbroath
- Glamis Primary School, Forfar
- Grange Primary School, Monifieth
- Hayshead Primary School, Arbroath
- Inverarity Primary School, Forfar
- Inverbrothock Primary School, Arbroath
- Inverkeilor Primary School, Arbroath
- Isla Primary School, Kirriemuir
- Ladyloan Primary School, Arbroath
- Langlands Primary School, Forfar
- Letham Primary School, Forfar
- Liff Primary School, Liff
- Lochside Primary School, Montrose
- Maisondieu Primary School, Brechin
- Mattocks Primary School, Wellbank
- Monikie Primary School, Monikie
- Muirfield Primary School, Arbroath
- Murroes Primary School, Murroes
- Newbigging Primary School, Monifieth
- Newtyle Primary School, Newtyle
- Northmuir Primary School, Kirriemuir
- Rosemount Primary School, Montrose
- Seaview Primary School, Monifieth
- Southesk Primary School, Montrose
- Southmuir Primary School, Kirriemuir
- St. Margaret's Primary School, Montrose
- St. Thomas' Primary School, Arbroath
- Stracathro Primary School, Brechin
- Strathmartine Primary School, Strathmartine
- Strathmore Primary School, Forfar
- Tannadice Primary School, Forfar
- Tealing Primary School, Tealing
- Timmergreens Primary School, Arbroath
- Warddykes Primary School, Arbroath
- Whitehills Primary School, Forfar
- Woodlands Primary School, Carnoustie

=== Secondary schools ===
- Arbroath Academy, Arbroath
- Arbroath High School, Arbroath
- Brechin High School, Brechin
- Carnoustie High School, Carnoustie
- Forfar Academy. Forfar
- Monifieth High School, Monifieth
- Montrose Academy, Montrose
- Webster's High School, Kirriemuir

== Argyll and Bute ==
=== Primary schools ===
- Achahoish Primary School, Achahoish
- Ardrishaig Primary School, Ardrishaig
- Arinagour Primary School, Coll
- Arrochar Primary School, Tarbet
- Barcaldine Primary School, Connel
- Bowmore Primary School, Islay
- Bunessan Primary School, Isle of Mull
- Cardross Primary School, Cardross
- Carradale Primary School, Carradale
- Castlehill Primary School, Campbeltown
- Clachan Primary School, Clachan, by Tarbert
- Colgrain Primary School, Helensburgh
- Craignish Primary School, Ardfern
- Dalintober Primary School, Campbeltown
- Dalmally Primary School, Dalmally
- Dervaig Primary School, Isle of Mull
- Drumlemble Primary School, Drumlemble
- Dunbeg Primary School, Dunbeg
- Dunoon Primary School, Dunoon
- Easdale Primary School, Seil by Oban
- Furnace Primary School, Furnace by Inveraray
- Garelochhead Primary School, Garelochhead
- Gigha Primary School, Isle of Gigha
- Glassary Primary School, Lochgilphead
- Glenbarr Primary School, Tarbert
- Hermitage Primary School, Helensburgh
- Innellan Primary School, Innellan
- Inveraray Primary School, Inveraray
- Iona Primary School, Iona
- John Logie Baird Primary School, Helensburgh
- Keills Primary School, Islay
- Kilchattan Primary School, Colonsay
- Kilchrenan Primary School, Taynuilt
- Kilcreggan Primary School, Helensburgh
- Kilmartin Primary School, Lochgilphead
- Kilmodan Primary School, Glendaruel
- Kilninver Primary School, by Oban
- Kirn Primary School, Dunoon
- Lismore Primary School, Lismore
- Lochdonhead Primary School, Isle of Mull
- Lochgilphead Joint Campus, Lochgilphead
- Lochgoilhead Primary School, Lochgoilhead
- Lochnell Primary School, Connel
- Luing Primary School, Luing
- Luss Primary School, by Alexandria
- North Bute Primary School, Port Bannatyne, Isle of Bute
- Park Primary School, Oban
- Port Charlotte Primary School, Port Charlotte, Islay
- Port Ellen Primary School, Port Ellen, Islay
- Rhu Primary School, Rhu, by Helensburgh
- Rhunahaorine Primary School, Tayinloan
- Rockfield Primary School, Oban
- Rosneath Primary School, Helensburgh
- Rothesay Joint Campus, Isle of Bute
- Salen Primary School, Isle of Mull
- Sandbank Primary School, Dunoon
- Small Isles Primary School, Craighouse, Jura
- St. Andrew's Primary School, Rothesay, Isle of Bute
- St. Columba's Primary School, Oban
- St. Joseph's Primary School, Helensburgh
- St. Mun's Primary School, Dunoon
- Strachur Primary School, Strachur
- Strath of Appin Primary School, Appin
- Strone Primary School, Strone, by Dunoon
- Tarbert Academy, Tarbert
- Taynuilt Primary School, Taynuilt
- Tayvallich Primary School, Tayvallich
- Tighnabruaich Primary School, Tighnabruaich
- Tiree High School, Tiree
- Tobermory High School, Tobermory
- Toward Primary School, Toward, Dunoon
- Ulva Primary School, Ulva Ferry, Isle of Mull

=== Secondary schools ===
- Campbeltown Grammar School, Campbeltown
- Dunoon Grammar School, Dunoon
- Hermitage Academy, Helensburgh
- Islay High School, Bowmore, Islay
- Lochgilphead Joint Campus, Lochgilphead
- Oban High School, Oban
- Rothesay Academy, Rothesay, Isle of Bute
- Tarbert Academy, Tarbert
- Tiree High School, Tiree
- Tobermory High School, Tobermory

=== Special schools ===
- Drummore Learning Centre, Oban
- Parklands Special School, Helensburgh

== Clackmannanshire ==
=== Nursery schools ===
- Sauchie ELC Centre, Sauchie
- Tulach ELC Centre, Tullibody

=== Primary schools ===
- Abercromby Primary School, Tullibody
- Alva Primary School, Alva
- Banchory Primary School, Tullibody
- Clackmannan Primary School, Clackmannan
- Coalsnaughton Primary School, Coalsnaughton
- Craigbank Primary School, Sauchie
- Deerpark Primary School, Sauchie
- Fishcross Primary School, Fishcross
- Menstrie Primary School, Menstrie
- Muckhart Primary School, Muckhart
- Park Primary School, Alloa
- Redwell Primary School, Alloa
- St. Bernadette's R.C. Primary School, Tullibody
- St. Mungo's R.C. Primary School, Alloa
- St. Serf's Primary School, Tullibody
- Strathdevon Primary School, Dollar
- Sunnyside Primary School, Alloa
- Tillicoultry Primary School, Tillicoultry

=== Secondary schools ===
- Alloa Academy, Alloa
- Alva Academy, Alva
- Lornshill Academy, Alloa

=== Special schools ===
- Lochies School, Sauchie

== Dumfries and Galloway ==
=== Primary schools ===
- Ae Primary School, Dumfries
- Amisfield Primary School, Dumfries
- Applegarth Primary School, Lockerbie
- Auchencairn Primary School, Castle Douglas
- Beattock Primary School, Moffat
- Belmont Primary School, Stranraer
- Borgue Primary School, Kirkcudbright
- Brownhall Primary School, Dumfries
- Brydekirk Primary School, Annan
- Caerlaverock Primary School, Dumfries
- Calside Primary School, Dumfries
- Canonbie Primary School, Canonbie
- Cargenbridge Primary School, Dumfries
- Carrutherstown Primary School, Dumfries
- Carsphairn Primary School, Carsphairn
- Castle Douglas Primary School, Castle Douglas
- Castle Kennedy Primary School, Castle Kennedy
- Closeburn Primary School, Thornhill
- Collin Primary School, Dumfries
- Colvend Primary School, Dalbeattie
- Creetown Primary School, Creetown
- Crossmichael Primary School, Castle Douglas
- Cummertrees Primary School, Annan
- Dalbeattie Primary School, Dalbeattie
- Dalry Primary School, Castle Douglas
- Drummore Primary School, Stranraer
- Duncow Primary School, Dumfries
- Dunscore Primary School, Dumfries
- Eaglesfield Primary School, Lockerbie
- Eastriggs Primary School, Eastriggs
- Elmvale Primary School, Annan
- Garlieston Primary School, Garlieston
- Gatehouse Primary School, Gatehouse of Fleet
- Gelston Primary School, Castle Douglas
- Georgetown Primary School, Dumfries
- Glenluce Primary School, Glenluce
- Gretna Primary School, Gretna
- Hardgate Primary School, Castle Douglas
- Heathhall Primary School, Dumfries
- Hecklegirth Primary School, Annan
- Hightae Primary School, Lockerbie
- Hoddom Primary School, Ecclefechan
- Holywood Primary School, Dumfries
- Hottsbridge Primary School, Lockerbie
- Hutton Primary School, Lockerbie
- Johnstonebridge Primary School, Lockerbie
- Kelloholm Primary School, Sanquhar
- Kells Primary School, New Galloway
- Kirkbean Primary School, Dumfries
- Kirkcolm Primary School, Kirkcolm
- Kirkcowan Primary School, Kirkcowan
- Kirkcudbright Primary School, Kirkcudbright
- Kirkgunzeon Primary School, Dumfries
- Kirkinner Primary School, Kirkinner
- Kirkpatrick Fleming Primary School, Lockerbie
- Langholm Primary School, Langholm
- Laurieknowe Primary School, Dumfries
- Leswalt Primary School, Stranraer
- Lincluden Primary School, Dumfries
- Locharbriggs Primary School, Dumfries
- Lochmaben Primary School, Lockerbie
- Lochrutton Primary School, Dumfries
- Lockerbie Primary School, Lockerbie
- Loreburn Primary School, Dumfries
- Minigaff Primary School, Newton Stewart
- Moffat Primary School, Moffat
- Moniaive Primary School, Moniaive
- Nethermill Primary School, Dumfries
- New Abbey Primary School, Dumfries
- Newington Primary School, Annan
- Noblehill Primary School, Dumfries
- North West Community Campus, Dumfries
- Palnackie Primary School, Castle Douglas
- Park Primary School, Stranraer
- Penninghame Primary School, Newton Stewart
- Penpont Primary School, Thornhill
- Portpatrick Primary School, Portpatrick
- Port William Primary School, Port William
- Rephad Primary School, Stranraer
- Sandhead Primary School, Stranraer
- Sanquhar Primary School, Sanquhar
- Shawhead Primary School, Dumfries
- Sheuchan Primary School, Stranraer
- Springfield Primary School, Gretna
- Springholm Primary School, Castle Douglas
- St. Andrew's R.C. Primary School, Dumfries
- St. Columba's R.C. Primary School, Annan
- St. Joseph's R.C. Primary School, Stranraer
- St. Michael's Primary School, Dumfries
- St. Mungo Primary School, Lockerbie
- St. Ninian's R.C. Primary School, Newton Stewart
- St. Teresa's R.C. Primary School, Dumfries
- Troqueer Primary School, Dumfries
- Tundergarth Primary School, Lockerbie
- Twynholm Primary School, Kirkcudbright
- Wallace Hall Primary School, Thornhill
- Whithorn Primary School, Whithorn
- Wigtown Primary School, Wigtown

=== Secondary schools ===
- Annan Academy
- Castle Douglas High School
- Dalbeattie High School
- Dalry Secondary School, St John's Town of Dalry
- Douglas Ewart High School, Newton Stewart
- Dumfries Academy

Dumfries High School

- Kirkcudbright Academy
- Langholm Academy
- Lockerbie Academy
- Moffat Academy
- North West Community Campus, Dumfries
- St Joseph's College
- Sanquhar Academy
- Stranraer Academy
- Wallace Hall Academy, Thornhill

== Other schools in Scotland ==
- List of independent schools in Scotland
- List of state schools in Scotland (city council areas)
- List of state schools in Scotland (council areas excluding cities, E–H)
- List of state schools in Scotland (council areas excluding cities, I–R)
- List of state schools in Scotland (council areas excluding cities, S–W)

== See also ==
- List of schools in the United Kingdom
- Education in the United Kingdom
- Education in Scotland
- Education Scotland
