= List of listed buildings in Tarves, Aberdeenshire =

This is a list of listed buildings in the parish of Tarves in Aberdeenshire, Scotland.

== List ==
Name	Location	Date Listed	Grid Ref. (Note: Sometimes known as OSGB36, the grid reference (where provided) is based on the British national grid reference system used by the Ordnance Survey. • "Guide to National Grid". Ordnance Survey. • "Get-a-map". Ordnance Survey.)	Geo-coordinates	Notes	LB Number (Note: Historic Environment Scotland assign a unique alphanumeric identifier to each designated site in Scotland, for listed buildings this always begins with "LB", for example "LB12345".)	Image
Gates On Avenue ("The Golden Gates") E.S.E. Of Haddo House				57°23′57″N 2°12′29″W	Category B	15978	Upload Photo
Howff Of Schivas				57°25′13″N 2°10′23″W	Category B	15984	Upload Photo
Schivas Walled Garden				57°25′14″N 2°10′29″W	Category C(S)	15985	Upload Photo
Aberdeen Arms Hotel				57°22′15″N 2°13′16″W	Category C(S)	16007	Upload Photo
Shethin Farmhouse				57°23′01″N 2°11′27″W	Category B	16010	Upload Photo
Mains Of Haddo, Farmhouse And Office				57°23′33″N 2°13′32″W	Category B	16016	Upload Photo
House of Schivas				57°25′17″N 2°10′23″W	Category B	15982	Upload Photo
West Block Of Farm Steading Schivas				57°25′22″N 2°10′20″W	Category C(S)	15986	Upload Photo
Tarves Manse				57°22′14″N 2°13′05″W	Category B	16008	Upload Photo
Tolquhon Monument, Tarves Churchyard				57°22′15″N 2°13′10″W	Category A	19770	Upload Photo
Monument Terminating Avenue E.S.E. Of Haddo House				57°23′49″N 2°12′02″W	Category B	15979	Upload Photo
Old Inn, S.E. Corner Of Tarves Square				57°22′15″N 2°13′14″W	Category C(S)	16006	Upload Photo
North Ythsie Farmhouse				57°22′03″N 2°11′26″W	Category B	16012	Upload Photo
Keithfield Lodge, Gates And Gatepiers Haddo House				57°23′26″N 2°15′02″W	Category C(S)	16015	Upload Photo
House Of Schivas, Large Sundial				57°25′17″N 2°10′23″W	Category B	15983	Upload Photo
Parish Church Of Tarves (St. Englat)				57°22′16″N 2°13′10″W	Category B	16004	Upload Photo
Bede House, Boghouse, Tarves				57°22′04″N 2°12′47″W	Category C(S)	16009	Upload Photo
South Lodge, Haddo House				57°23′12″N 2°12′31″W	Category C(S)	16013	Upload Photo
Bridge Of Auchedly Over River Ythan				57°23′44″N 2°09′54″W	Category C(S)	15981	Upload Photo
Pair Of Stags, Flanking Avenue E.S.E. Of Haddo House				57°23′50″N 2°12′05″W	Category B	19768	Upload Photo
Tolquhon Castle				57°20′53″N 2°12′48″W	Category A	15980	Upload Photo
Tarves Churchyard				57°22′15″N 2°13′09″W	Category C(S)	16005	Upload Photo
South Ythsie Farmhouse				57°21′58″N 2°11′27″W	Category C(S)	16011	Upload Photo
Mains Of Haddo, North Front Of Steading				57°23′34″N 2°13′29″W	Category B	16014	Upload Photo
Hill Of Ysthie, Monument To Prime Minister The 4Th Earl Of Aberdeen				57°22′25″N 2°11′38″W	Category C(S)	13883	Upload another image See more images

== Key ==
The scheme for classifying buildings in Scotland is:

- Category A: "buildings of national or international importance, either architectural or historic; or fine, little-altered examples of some particular period, style or building type."
- Category B: "buildings of regional or more than local importance; or major examples of some particular period, style or building type, which may have been altered."
- Category C: "buildings of local importance; lesser examples of any period, style, or building type, as originally constructed or moderately altered; and simple traditional buildings which group well with other listed buildings."

In March 2016 there were 47,288 listed buildings in Scotland. Of these, 8% were Category A, and 50% were Category B, with the remaining 42% being Category C.

== See also ==
- List of listed buildings in Aberdeenshire
