= Meldrum Academy =

Secondary school in Scotland

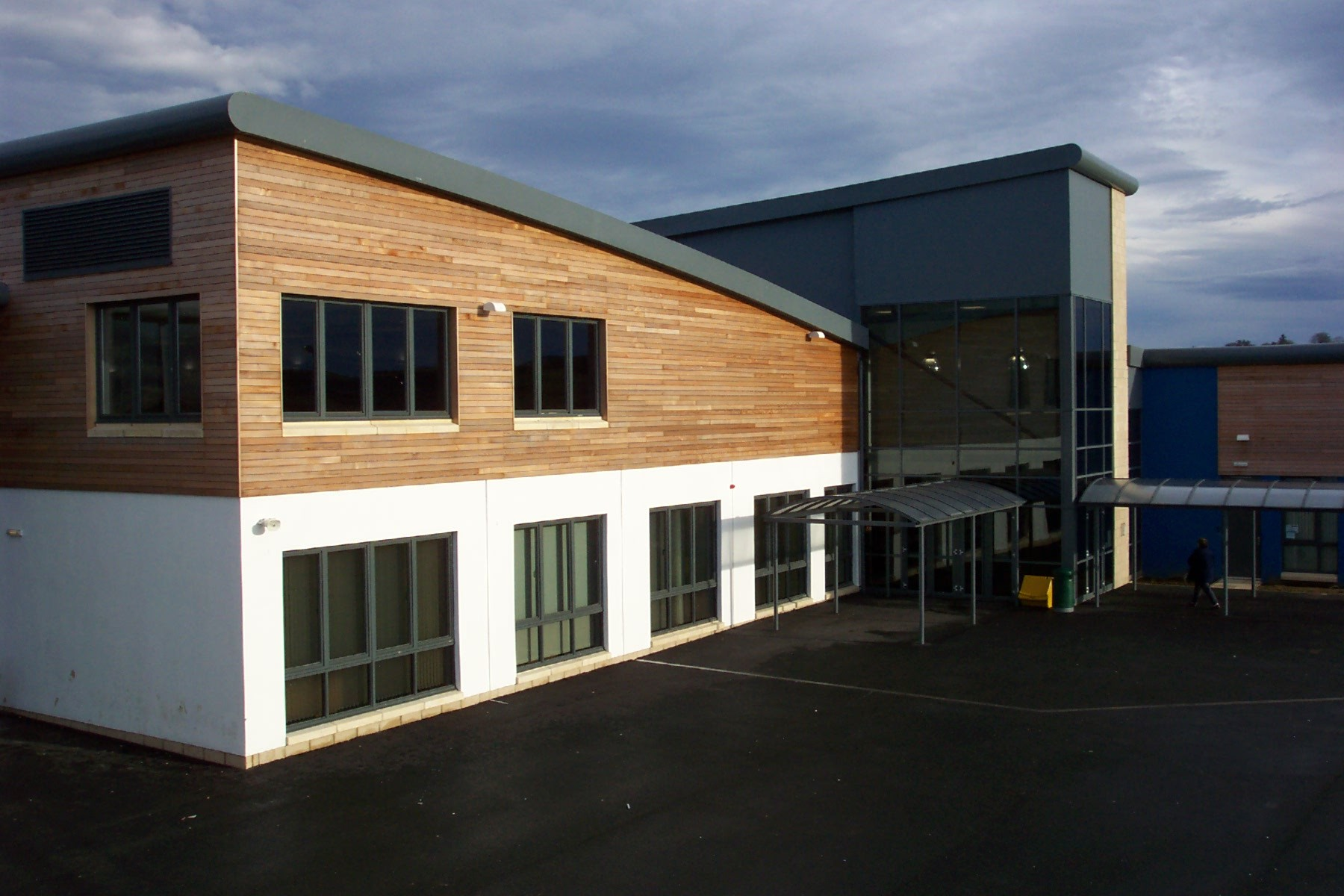

Location
- Colpy Road; Oldmeldrum, AB51 0NT; Scotland
- 57.3371°N 2.3322°W

Information
- Motto: Working Together for Success
- Established: 2002
- Local authority: Aberdeenshire Council
- Head teacher: Ian Jackson
- Gender: Coeducational
- Age: 11 to 18
- Enrolment: 1,050 (2024/25)
- Houses: Bruce Glennie Slessor Telford Wallace
- School years: S1-S6
- Website: Meldrum Academy

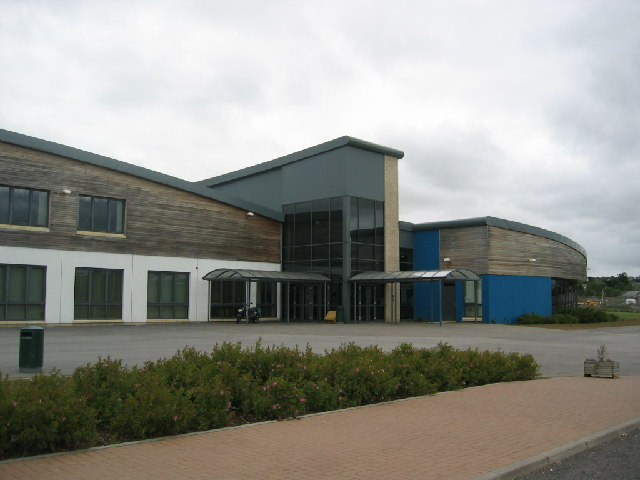
Academy, c. 2005

Meldrum Academy is a secondary school in Oldmeldrum, Aberdeenshire, Scotland, operated by Aberdeenshire Council.

== History ==
Meldrum Academy was established in 2002, and opened by HRH The Princess Royal on 3 August 2002, in the presence of the Lord Lieutenant, Angus Farquharson of Finzean. The academy was created to reduce pressures on the Ellon Academy and the Inverurie Academy. It initially admitted S1 and S2 pupils only, with S2 pupils transferring from nearby Ellon and Inverurie academies. With 350 new students, it was considered to be the region's first "super-school", and the first to be created under a private finance initiative. Facilities constructed included a library, computing infrastructure, performance theatre-style large assembly hall, gymnasium with spectator gallery, and music and drama studios. Andrew Sutherland was the first head teacher until 2008.

In 2005, the academy was part of a pilot sports initiative, 'Girls in Sport and Physical Activity' across Scotland. In 2006 the school reached full student occupancy.

In 2022 the academy was the first Aberdeenshire school and one of 90 secondary schools across five European countries including Scotland to trial an initiative of strong leadership in digital education.

== Activities ==
The five school houses are Bruce, Glennie, Slessor, Telford and Wallace.

A school community garden allows for agricultural and horticultural student learning. In 2022, an accessible path was added to assist students with mobility issues.

In January 2022, the Meldrum Academy Pipe Band was formed, and has performed at a number of events in the area including at Haddo House and Pitmedden Garden. Band members wear the Aberdeenshire Council tartan.

The school is also the start and finish of the Barra Half marathon to the nearby Barra Hill, in its inaugural 2026 year.

== Feeder schools ==
There are twelve feeder schools:

- Barthol Chapel Primary School, to the north. In 2024, 29 students.
- Cultercullen Primary School, to the east. In 2025, 50 students.
- Daviot Primary School, to the west. In 2024, 81 students.
- Logie Durno Primary School, to the west. In 2024, 45 students.
- Meldrum Primary School. In 2026, about 200 students.
- Methlick Primary School, to the north-east.
- Old Rayne Primary School, to the west. In 2025, 59 students.
- Pitmedden Primary School, to the east. In 2024, 163 students.
- Rayne North Primary School, to the west. In 2025, 65 students.
- Rothienorman Primary School, to the north-west. In 2025, 121 students.
- Tarves Primary School, to the north-east. In 2026, 167 students.
- Udny Green Primary School, to the east. In 2024, 61 students.

== See also ==
- List of state schools in Scotland (council areas excluding cities)
