= Diamond Bridge =

21st century bridge in Aberdeen, Scotland

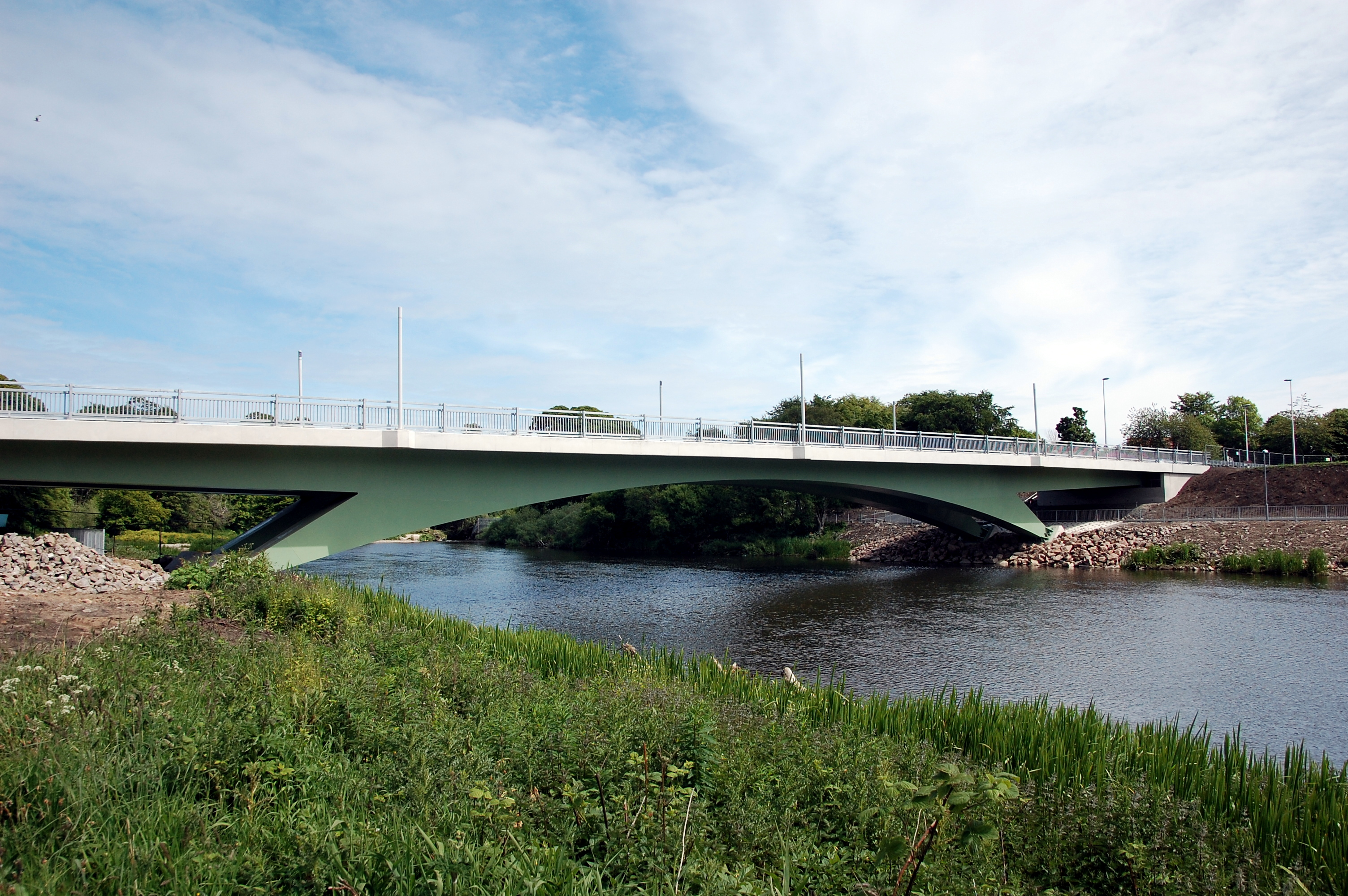
- Bridge across the River Don
- Coordinates: 57.176272°N 2.118360°W
- Carries: B988
- Crosses: River Don
- Locale: Aberdeen
- Named for: River Dee
- Preceded by: Grandholm Bailey Bridge
- Followed by: Brig o' Balgownie

Characteristics
- Material: Steel

History
- Designer: Balfour Beatty
- Construction start: 17 November 2014
- Construction cost: £22,000,000
- Opened: 9 June 2016

Location
- Interactive map of Diamond Bridge

The Diamond Bridge, known during planning and construction as the Third Don Crossing, is a road bridge across the River Don in Aberdeen, Scotland. It opened to traffic on 9 June 2016. It is the third crossing of the river open to all traffic between the suburbs of Bridge of Don and Aberdeen City, after the Bridge of Don and Persley Bridge.

== History ==
Proposals for a third Don crossing have been made since the 1970s. The city council agreed to begin the project in 2003, and by 2004 decided on a preferred route. Construction began in November 2014 and the completed bridge was opened in June 2016.

A worker Ian Walker was killed by an excavator during construction of the Don Crossing on 13 January 2016, an incident that led to Balfour Beatty being fined £600,000.

== Route ==
A new 2.4 km (1.5 mi) road connects Fairview Street in Danestone to the bridge, which then crosses to Gordon's Mills Road in Tillydrone. The crossing allows traffic from northern suburbs to reach the city centre without having to join the confluence of two of Aberdeen's busiest roads, the A92 and A96, at the Haudagain roundabout. Along with the new crossing, the "Berryden Corridor" project aimed to address a pinch point on the city’s road network and improve traffic flow.

== Gallery ==
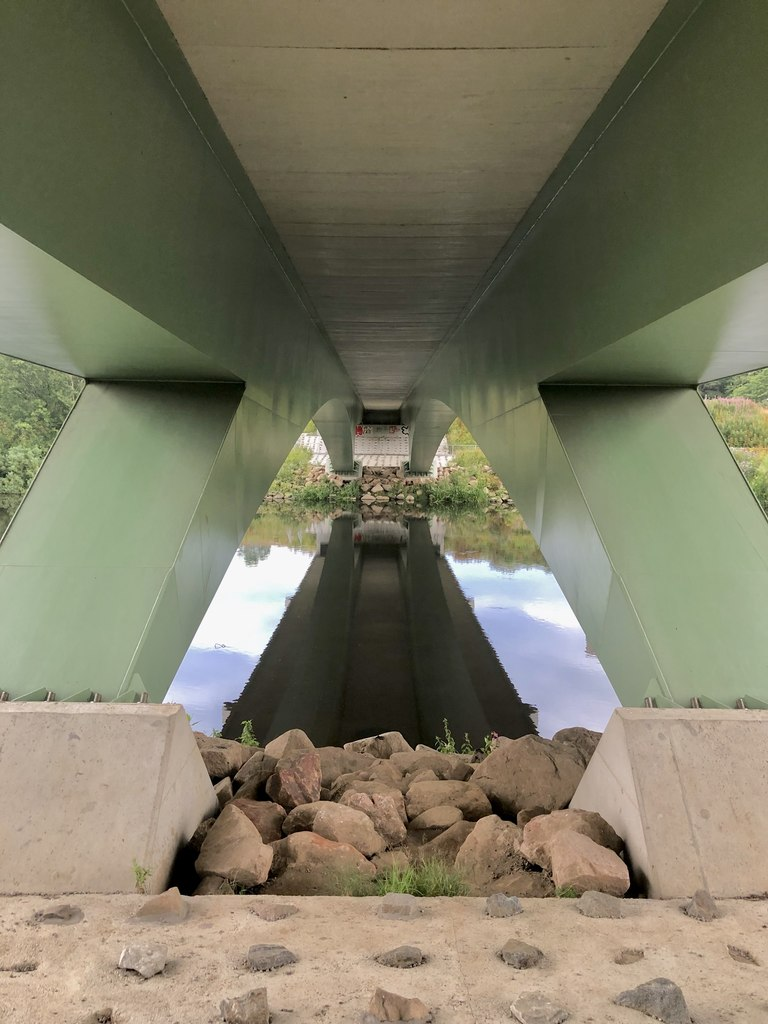
Underneath the bridge

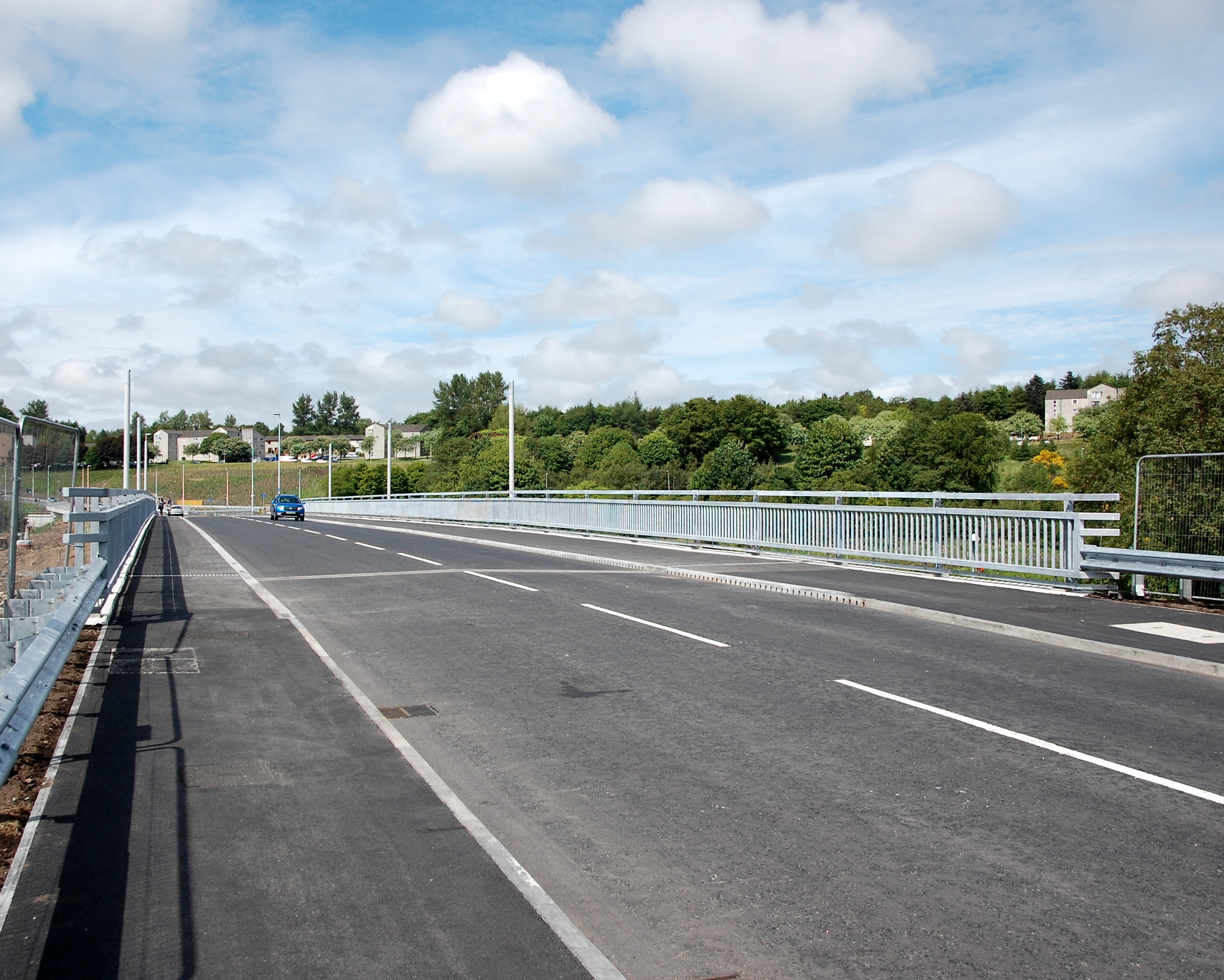
Bridge's surface

== See also ==
- List of bridges in Scotland
- Transport in Aberdeen
