= Brig o' Balgownie =

13th-century bridge in Aberdeen, Scotland

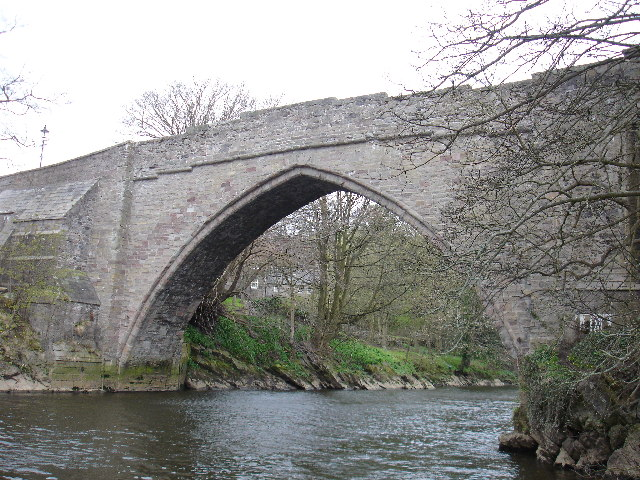
- The Brig o' Balgownie in April 2005
- Coordinates: 57.17725°N 2.09853°W
- OS grid reference: NJ 94141 09608
- Carries: Pedestrians
- Crosses: River Don, Aberdeenshire
- Locale: Aberdeen
- Other names: Balgownie Bridge; Bridge of Balgownie; Bridge of Don
- Maintained by: Aberdeen City Council
- Preceded by: Diamond Bridge
- Followed by: Bridge of Don

Characteristics
- Design: Arch
- Material: Sandstone and granite
- Width: 3.2 metres (10 ft)
- Height: 12 metres (39 ft)
- Longest span: 21 metres (69 ft)
- No. of spans: 1

History
- Designer: Uncertain, possibly Richard Cementarius (Note: Richard Cementarius died long before the bridge completed construction.)
- Construction start: Late 13th century (Note: Thought to have started construction c. 1272 and completed after a long interruption c. 1320.)
- Construction end: 1320; 706 years ago
- Rebuilt: 1607-1611

Listed Building – Category A
- Official name: Brig O' Balgownie Over River Don
- Designated: 12 January 1967
- Reference no.: LB20067

Location
- Interactive map of Brig o' Balgownie

The Brig o' Balgownie is a 13th-century bridge spanning the River Don in Old Aberdeen, Scotland. It is the oldest standing bridge in Scotland.

The bridge is constructed of granite and sandstone. Its single gothic arch has span of over 21 metres (69 ft) and an apex of 12 metres (39 ft) above the water-line.

== Etymology ==
The words brig and o' are Scots for "bridge" and "of". The name "Balgownie" comes from the surrounding area, Balgownie, which from an early time was a barony. The name itself has a Gaelic origin, but is a source of some debate. Some authorities believe that the first part of the name derives from Baile and means "town". However the very earliest references to the barony, or settlement, of Balgownie invariably have the word as Palgoueny, or Polgowny, or a number of minor variants, generally starting with Pol. Pol relates to a pool, probably the one known as the "black neuk". However it may be that P and B are interchangeable and the distinction may not affect the meaning. There are two possible suggestions for the second part, some say that gabhainn, genitive of gabhann, means "of a cattle-fold" whilst others have asserted that it derives from gobhainn which indicates a blacksmith, or just a smith.

The first recorded instance of the name of Polgowny dates from 1256, but it is in all likelihood older.

== History ==
Construction of the bridge was begun in the late 13th century by Richard Cementarius, but not completed until 1320 at the time of the Scottish War of Independence. After falling into disrepair in the mid 16th century it was extensively renovated from 1607 to 1611.

For five centuries the bridge was the only route from the north into Aberdeen until 1830 when the new Bridge of Don was built 500 yards (460 m) downstream. This made it an important asset to militaries and trade routes in the north-east of Scotland.

=== Who built the bridge ===
The familiar story is that the stone bridge was commissioned by either Bishop Henry Cheyne or Robert the Bruce, or indeed was begun by the former and completed by the latter, and that the work was done by Richard Cementarius. It is said that Cheyne started the work but fled Bruce's troops, and then Bruce finished the work later on. However, the earliest written version of the origins of the bridge is slightly at odds with later ones. The first written history of the bridge was by Sir Alexander Hay, in a charter of 1605. In the charter he wrote that the bridge "was built by command, and at the expense of, the deceased most invincible prince, Robert Bruce, king of the Kingdom of Scotland." This account only contains one element of what becomes a fairly consistent story. Parson Gordon was the first to record a fuller version of the story some sixty years after Hay. He wrote: "No man can certainly tell who builded the Bridge of Done. The commone and most probable reporte is that the renouned Prince Robert Bruisse, King of Scotland, at such tyme as he banished B. Henrie Cheyne from his sea, and drave him out of Scotland beside, did command for to sequester the bishops yeerlie revenue to be imployed towards pious uses, and that this bridge (which is lyke to be true) was builted with a part of that revenue."

Thus the two earliest versions of this story both put the onus for building the bridge on Robert the Bruce, and neither mention involvement by Bishop Cheyne. This story has been repeated a number of times over the centuries often with only minor changes. In 1780 Francis Douglas wrote that it "is said to have been built by Henry Cheyne, bishop of Aberdeen, about the year 1290, or by King Robert the Bruce, who perhaps completed what the bishop had begun." In the 19th century Camden wrote that "it was projected by Bishop Henry Cheyne … and built at his expense". In the 20th century Alexander Keith tells all elements of the story: that it was started by Bruce or Cheyne, but certainly completed by the former. He favours the Bruce version citing Hay and Boece as his evidence. The story about the involvement of Cementarius is an entirely new one, and seems to be no older than the 20th century. It was perhaps first stated by W. Douglas Simpson.

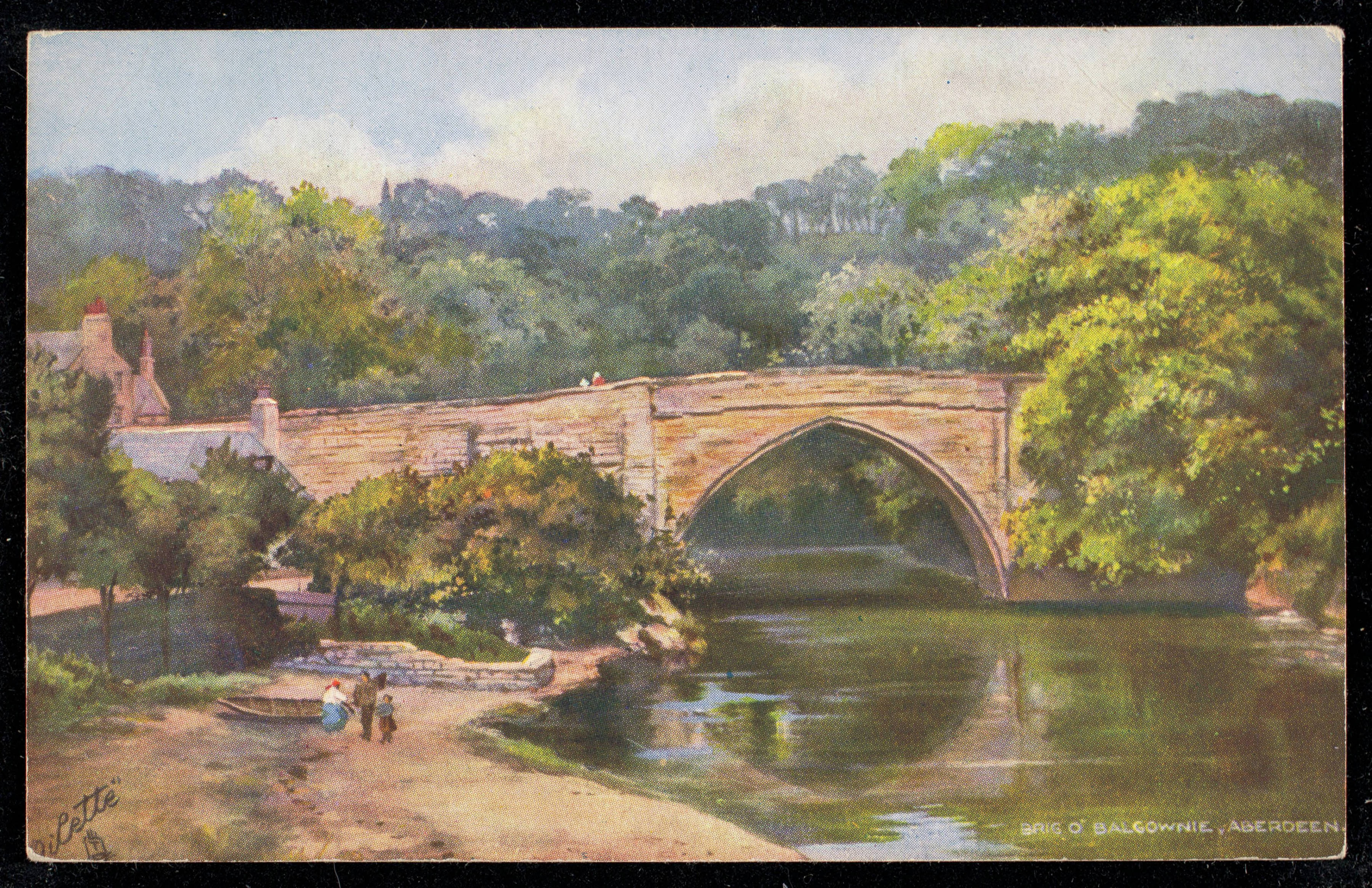
Painting of the bridge from the early 20th century

Richard Cementarius is often cited as the first Provost of Aberdeen, or rather the first Alderman. However, that can not be correct: what would be correct would be to say that he is the first person whose name has been connected with that office in some official document, and that therefore he is the first recorded Provost of Aberdeen.^{mynote19} However that does not seem to be true either. Certainly Richard is an historical figure: there is a contemporary reference to Richard in the Exchequer Rolls return for Aberdeen of 1264 which refers to "Magistro Ri. Cementario" in the context of work being carried out of Aberdeen Castle. What is important is that he is not specifically described as "provost". Other documents about him all refer to him as a burgess of the Burgh, but never as provost. Moreover, he seems to have been dead by 1294. In that year Malcolm of Palogoueny and Duncan the merchant, both described as burgesses, wrote a charter in which they acted as guarantors of the estate of the late Richard, also described as burgess. He had left monies and annual rents to the altar of St John the Apostle in the Church of St Nicholas. The altar itself he seems to have founded in 1277. So from these it is probable that he was alive in 1277 but dead by 1294, therefore any involvement that he had with building the bridge would have to have been before 1294. As we do not know when the bridge was built it is unclear if he could have been involved. But it is a modern story whose only real prop is the similarity between the arch in the bridge and an arch in Drum Castle, also ascribed to Cementarius, but not proved and that certainly needs more research. However, it may simply have reflected a common building style.

=== Maintenance ===
Before 1605 there was no regular means for funding maintenance of the bridge, and due to a lack of substantial monies some of the work repairs were necessarily temporary in nature. By 1605 the bridge was in a state of major deterioration when Sir Alexander Hay of Whytburgh established a fund for the maintenance of the bridge and various other entities also raised money to contribute to the bulk of repairs required, resulting in its complete renovation between 1607 and 1611. The first actual use of Hay's fund was for purchasing new cobblestones in 1616, and the fund has been maintained since by Aberdeen Council.

== In popular culture ==
The bridge is mentioned in Lord Byron's Don Juan poem in the tenth canto, "The Dee, the Don, Balgounie's brig's black wall".

== See also ==
- List of bridges in Scotland
- Transport in Aberdeen

== Footnotes ==
1. Alexander, W. (1954). The Place Names of Aberdeenshire. Aberdeen Third Spalding Club. xliii. See also, Milne, J. (1912). Celtic Place Names of Aberdeenshire. With a Vocabulary of Gaelic Words Not in Dictionaries. The Meaning and Etymology of the Gaelic Names of Places in Aberdeenshire. Aberdeen. pp. 42.
2. For example, see Alexander, W. (1954). The Place Names of Aberdeenshire. Aberdeen Third Spalding Club. p. 102. where the place name Pitgersie (meaning shoe maker's place) can also be expressed as Balgerscho (or a number of minor variants) where the first part of the name differs it does not affect the meaning of the name. However, Alexander also notes (p.xlvii) that Pit often refers to a town in the same sense as Bal, so it is possible that Pol was a different element with a different meaning.
3. Milne, J. (1912). Celtic Place Names …. p. 33. gives 'town of the cattlefold'.
4. Alexander, W. (1954). Place Names …. p. 15.
5. In the ecclesiastical statutes of St Machar's issued in 1256 the rights of the salmon fishing at Palgoueny were given to the deacon of the Cathedral, Innes, C. (1845). Registrum Episcopatus Aberdonensis, Volume II. Aberdeen Spalding Club. p. 39.
6. Anderson, P.J., ed. (1980). Charters and Other Writs Illustrating the History of the Royal Burgh of Aberdeen, MCLXXI - MDCCCIV. Aberdeen New Spalding Club. p. 352.
7. Innes, C., ed. (1842). Parson Gordon's Aberdoniae Vtrivsque Descriptio. A Description of Both Touns of Aberdeen. Edinburgh, Spalding Club. p. 26.
8. Douglas, F. (1826). A General Description of the East Coast of Scotland, from Edinburgh to Cullen; Including a brief account of the Universities of St. Andrews and Aberdeen, of the Trades and Manufacturers carried on in the large Towns, and the Improvements of the Country. In a Series of Letters to a Friend, 2nd edition. Aberdeen. p. 135.
9. Camden, W. (1818). Annals of Aberdeen, from the Reign of King William the Lion, to the end of the Year 1818; with an Account of the City, Cathedral, and the University of Old Aberdeen, Volume I. London. p. 420. Camden goes on to note that the story is in all likelihood false and he favours the Bruce version, as he relies on Hay's charter as evidence.
10. Keith, Alexander (1980). A Thousand Years of Aberdeen. Aberdeen. p. 31. Keith quotes the following from Boerce, 'out of joy that he was received into the King's favour, upon his return home, he applied all the rents of his see, which during his absence had accresced to a considerable sum, towards building the stately bridge over the River Don'. However, in Moir, J., ed. (1894). Boece's Murthlacensium et Aberdonensium Episcoporum Vitae. Aberdeen New Spalding Club. pp. 16–18., in the part where he deals with Cheyne there is no mention whatsoever of his part in the building of the bridge suggesting Keith's quote is entirely fraudulent. Curiously in the 20th Century the 1320s seem to have taken precedence over the 1280s as having been when the bridge was built, see Shepherd, I. (1996). Aberdeen and North East Scotland. Edinburgh. p. 60. who gives the date 1329 without footnote.
11. Wyness, F. (1972). City by the Grey North Sea. Aberdeen. p. 121.
12. The first time this was given was in MacDonald Munro, A. (1897). Memorials of the Aldermen, Provosts and Lord Provosts of Aberdeen. Aberdeen. pp. XX.
13. J. Cooper, ed. (1892). Cartularium Ecclesiae Sancti Nicholai Aberdonensis, Volume II. Aberdeen. p. 314.
14. J. Cooper, ed. (1892). Cartularium Ecclesiae Sancti Nicholai Aberdonensis, Volume II. Aberdeen. pp. 41 and 181.
