= Barthol Chapel =

Village in Aberdeenshire, Scotland

Coordinates: 57.397°N 2.310°W

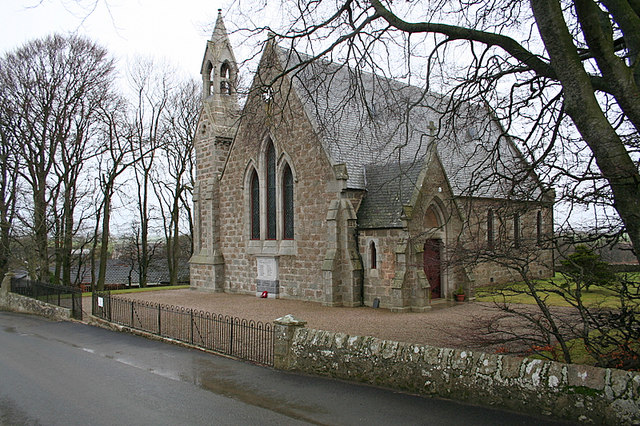
- Barthol Chapel kirk

- Location within Aberdeenshire
- OS grid reference: NJ814241
- Council area: Aberdeenshire
- Lieutenancy area: Aberdeenshire
- Country: Scotland
- Sovereign state: United Kingdom
- Post town: INVERURIE
- Postcode district: AB51
- Dialling code: 01651
- Police: Scotland
- Fire: Scottish
- Ambulance: Scottish
- UK Parliament: Gordon and Buchan
- Scottish Parliament: Aberdeenshire East

Barthol Chapel is a small village in the Formartine area of Aberdeenshire, Scotland, named after the Catholic saint St Bartholomew. The village has a school with a small football pitch and a community hub, located in the former kirk. Local speech traditionally includes the Doric dialect of North East Scotland. Nearby villages include Methlick, Fyvie, Oldmeldrum and Tarves.
