= Richard Cementarius =

Richard Cementarius (a.k.a. Richard the Mason) was a 13th-century Scottish architect and became the first Provost of Aberdeen in 1272. He held the title of Kings Master Mason to King Alexander III of Scotland.

He is believed to have designed the old tower of Drum Castle and is known to be the architect of the nearby Brig o' Balgownie, both of which contain distinctive pointed arches characteristic of his work.

Civic offices
New office	Lord Provost of Aberdeen; 1272–1273	Succeeded by Mathew Greatheued
