= Alexander Forbes Irvine =

Scottish landowner, advocate, philosopher and amateur astronomer (1818–1892)

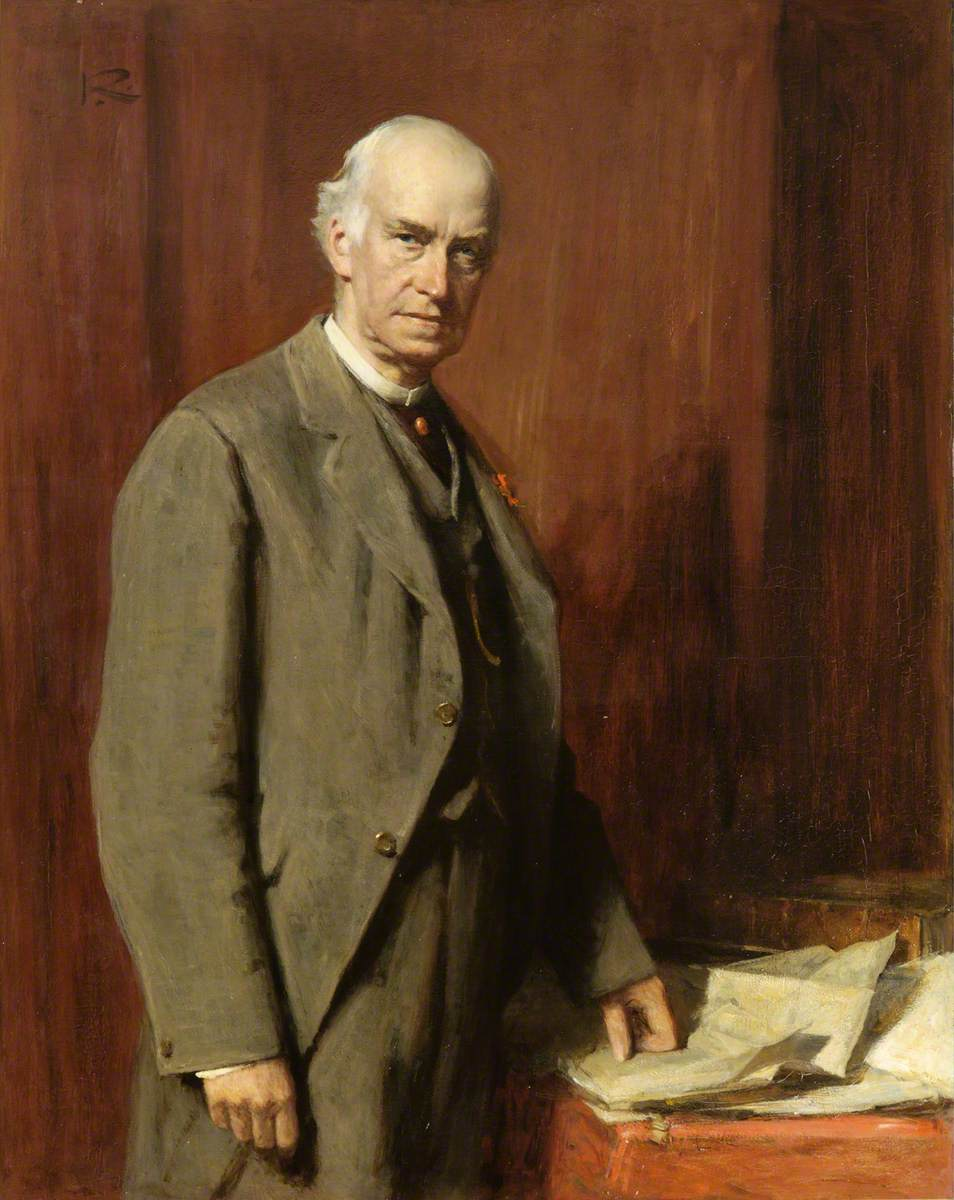
- Born: 18 February 1818; Schivas House, Tarves, Aberdeenshire, Scotland
- Died: 4 April 1892 (aged 74); Drum Castle, Scotland
- Education: Marischal College, University of Aberdeen; University of Edinburgh
- Occupations: Landowner, advocate, philosopher, amateur astronomer
- Known for: Prominent member of Clan Irvine, Dean of the Faculty of Advocates, Principal Clerk of the Justiciary Court, Sheriff of Argyll, Fellow of the Royal Society of Edinburgh
- Spouse: Anna Margaretta Forbes-Leslie (m. 1848)
- Children: 2
- Parent(s): Margaret Hamilton and Alexander Forbes Irvine, 19th Laird of Drum

Alexander Forbes Irvine, 20th Laird of Drum FRSE JP DL LLD (18 February 1818 – 4 April 1892) was a Scottish landowner, advocate, philosopher and amateur astronomer. He was a prominent member of Clan Irvine and held the family seat of Drum Castle until his death.

== Life ==
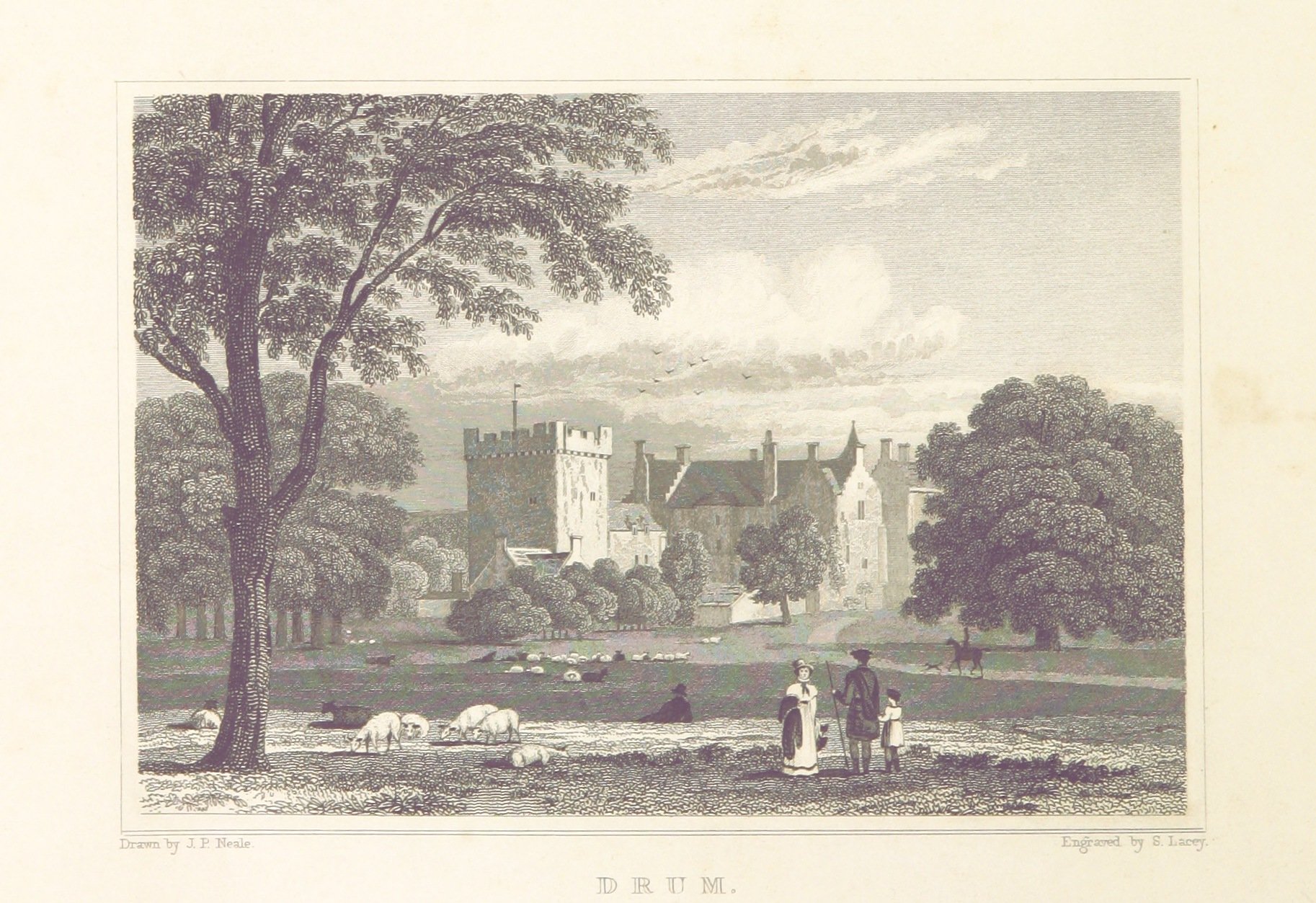
Drum Castle in 1829 (by John Preston Neale)

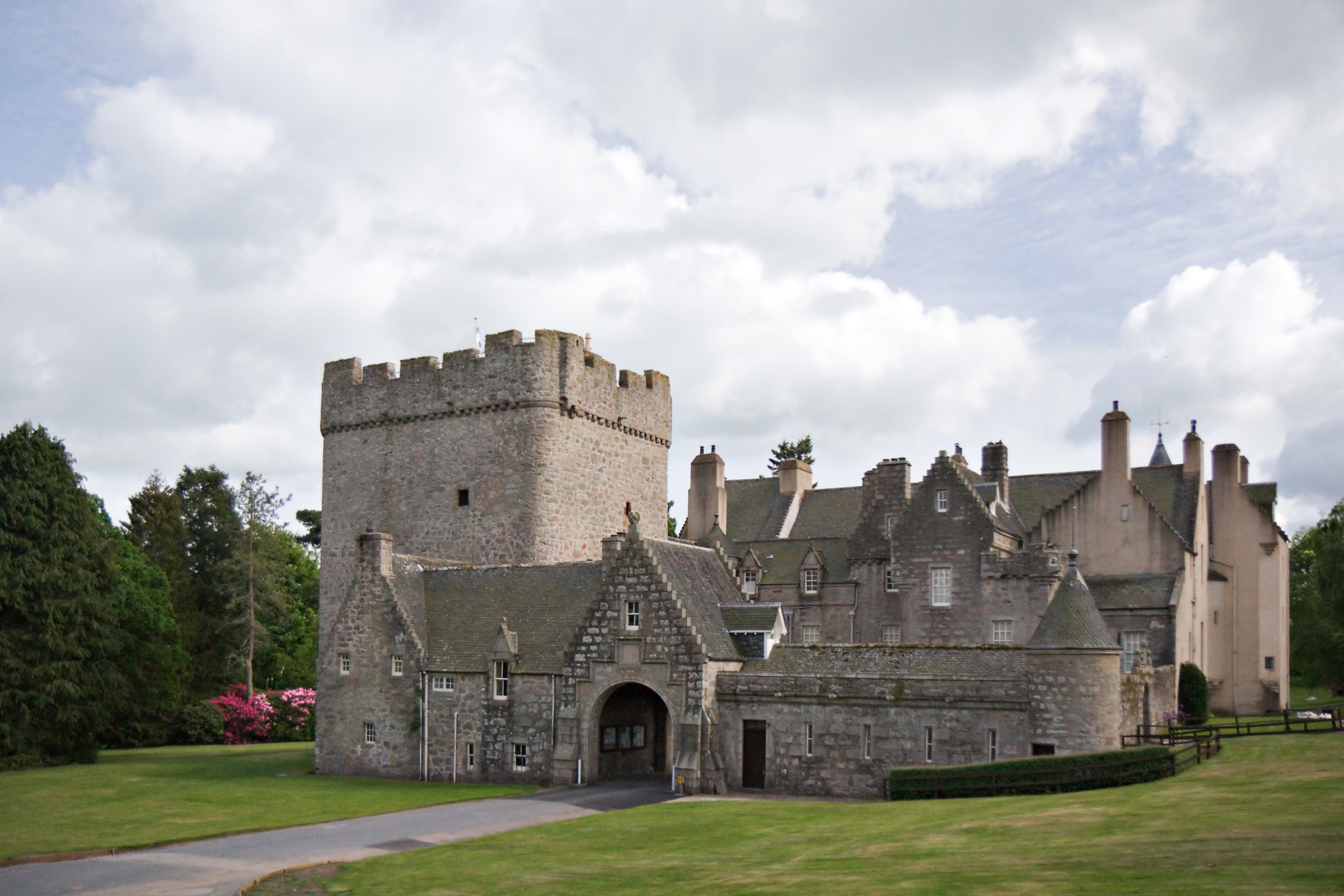
Drum Castle in 2007

Irvine was born at Schivas House near the village of Tarves in Aberdeenshire on 18 February 1818, the son of Margaret Hamilton of the Hamiltons of Little Earnick, and Alexander Forbes Irvine, 19th Laird of Drum. He was a friend of his near neighbour, Cosmo Innes, and their careers followed very parallel paths. Other friends included William Forbes Skene of Rubbislaw and Sir David Lindsay.

He was home tutored rather than attending school, then studied law first at Marischal College in the University of Aberdeen then at the University of Edinburgh. He passed the Scottish bar as an advocate in 1848 and rose to be Dean of the Faculty of Advocates. He was Principal Clerk of the Justiciary Court from 1867 to 1874, and Sheriff of Argyll from 1874 to 1891.

Irvine inherited the Drum Estate in 1861, on the death of his father. In 1875/1876, he arranged for a restoration of the courtyard, and the addition of an arched entrance and angle tower. He was also partly responsible for a restoration of the chapel.

In 1878, Irvine was elected a Fellow of the Royal Society of Edinburgh. His proposers were Sir Alexander Grant, Charles Neaves, Lord Neaves, Edward Sang and Peter Guthrie Tait. He twice served as Vice President to the Society: 1883 to 1887 and 1890 to 1892.

In 1886, he co-founded the New Spalding Club. In 1887 the University of Edinburgh awarded him an honorary doctorate (LLD).

Irvine died at Drum Castle on 4 April 1892, "the head of one of the oldest families in Great Britain".

== Family ==
In 1848 Irvine married Anna Margaretta Forbes-Leslie, daughter of Lieutenant-Colonel Jonathan Leslie of Rothienorman, a noted amateur archaeologist.

Their children were Alexander Charles Quentin Hamilton Irvine, and Francis Hugh Forbes Irvine, 21st Laird of Drum.

== Artistic recognition ==
Irvine was painted by George Reid PRSA.
