= Duncan Mearns =

Scottish minister

Duncan Mearns (1779–1852) was a Scottish minister who served as Moderator of the General Assembly of the Church of Scotland in 1821. He was professor of divinity at Aberdeen University from 1816.

== Life ==
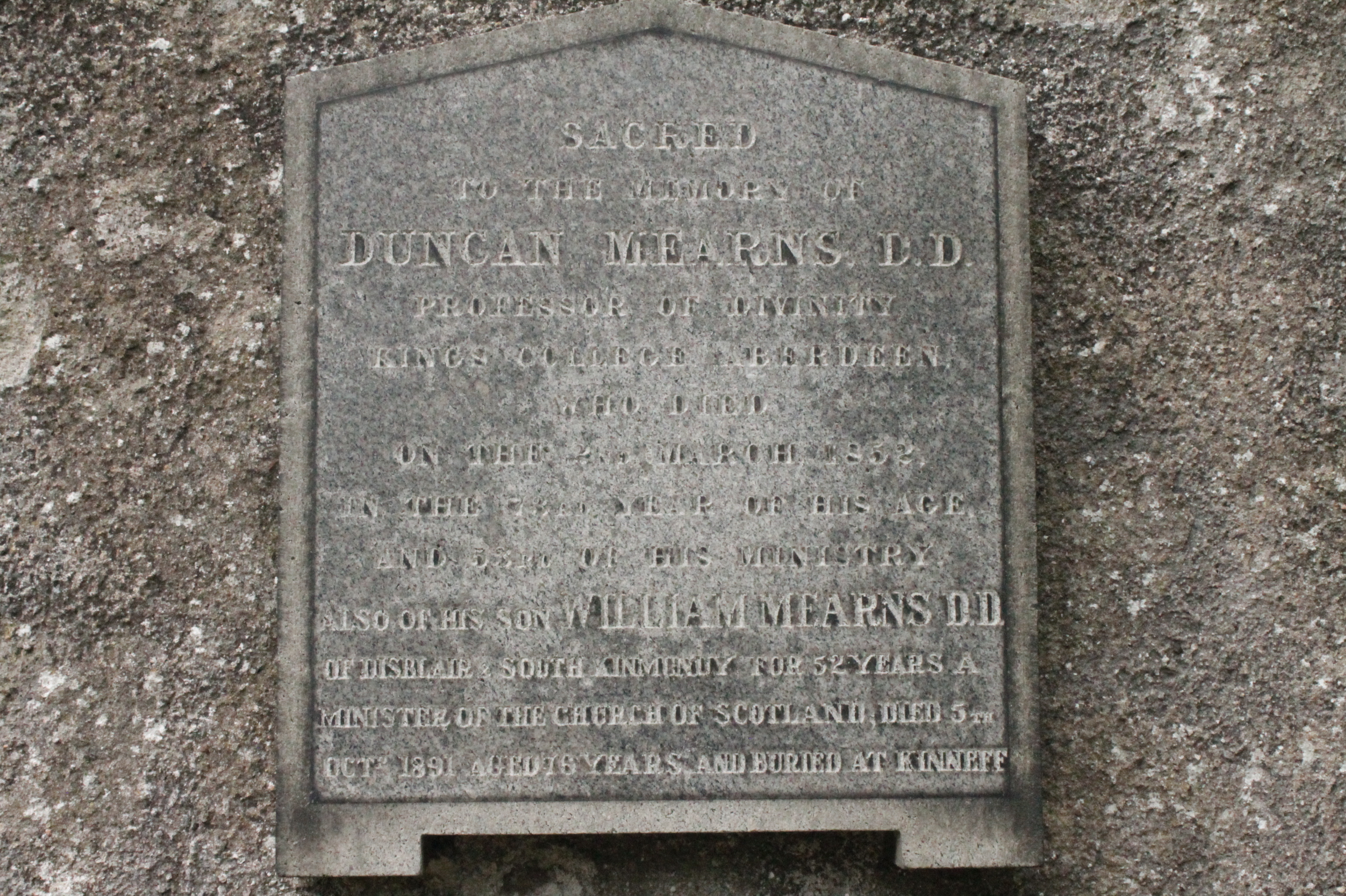
The grave of Rev Prof Duncan Mearns, St Machar's Cathedral

He was born in the manse at Cluny in Aberdeenshire on 23 August 1779 the son of Rev Alexander Mearns, and his wife, Anne Morison, daughter of James Morison of Disblair, who had served as Provost of Aberdeen in 1745. Duncan entered King's College, Aberdeen with a bursary in 1791 (aged 12) to study divinity under Rev Prof Gilbert Gerard and Rev Prof George Campbell. He graduated MA in March 1795, aged 15.

He was licensed to preach in the Church of Scotland in the summer of 1799 and found a patron soon after in the Earl of Aberdeen, and he was ordained as minister of Tarves in Aberdeenshire in November 1799.

In October 1816 he became professor of divinity, replacing his mentor Prof Gilbert Gerard. In 1821 he was elected Moderator of the General Assembly of the Church of Scotland. In 1823 he was created Chaplain in Ordinary in Scotland to King George IV. In 1830 he was living at 1 Chaplainry on the grounds of Aberdeen University.

He died after a long illness on 2 March 1852. He is buried in the churchyard of St Machar's Cathedral in Old Aberdeen. The grave lies against the east wall of the church.

== Family ==
In 1808 in Udny manse he married Elizabeth (Eliza) Forsyth, daughter of William Forsyth of Huntly. They had two sons and six daughters including Rev William Morison Mearns DD (died 1891), minister of Kinneff. His daughter Anne married Rev Prof Robert Macpherson (1806-1867), who succeeded him in the chair of divinity at Aberdeen. His daughter Jane was married to Dr Hercules Scott, who became professor of moral philosophy at Aberdeen.

== Publications ==
- The Knowledge Requisite for the Attainment of Eternal Life (1825)
- Scripture Characters (posthumously in 1853)
