= House of Schivas =

16th-century tower house in Aberdeenshire, Scotland

- Near Methlick, Aberdeenshire, Scotland

Site information
- Type: Tower house
- Condition: Restored

Location
- Coordinates: 57.4214°N 2.1730°W

Site history
- Built: 16th century
- Materials: Stone

House of Schivas is a 16th-century L-plan tower house located about three miles east of Methlick, in the valley of the River Ythan, Aberdeenshire, Scotland.

== History ==
The land was owned by Schivas of that Ilk in the 14th century, before passing through heiresses to the Lipp family and then to the Maitland family. George, Lord Gordon came into possession of the lands in 1467, although Thomas Gray of Scheves was in occupation by 1509. It is thought that this family built the present castle.

By 1721 the Forbes family owned the castle and carried out internal alterations. By the late 19th century it had become a farmhouse. After being burned out in 1900, the building was restored in 1902 for Lord Aberdeen by the architect Sydney Mitchell. Thomas Catto, 1st Baron Catto later had the castle embellished by J Fenton Wyness, an antiquarian architect.

The original building has been attributed to Thomas Leper, around 1585. The north-east tower, three storeys high, was added by the Forbeses in about 1750, along with a western extension to the main block in 1780.

== Structure ==
House of Schivas is a tall tower house with a modern courtyard replacing the original. A wide circular stair tower projecting from the north front of the main block gives access to all floors, while a stair tower in the re-entrant angle rises from the first floor level. There is also a modern timber re-entrant angle turret.

The wing is offset slightly to the east, probably to provide additional protection for the entrance to the re-entrant angle. The main doorway has four groups of shot holes of differing forms around it. The kitchen is located in the vaulted basement, from which a vaulted passage leads to two cellars.

The hall is panelled in sequoia wood, and has aumbries, a garderobe and a chapel recess with a crucifix and the monogram I.H.S.

It is a category B listed building.
