= Bridge of Don (bridge) =

19th century bridge in Aberdeen, Scotland

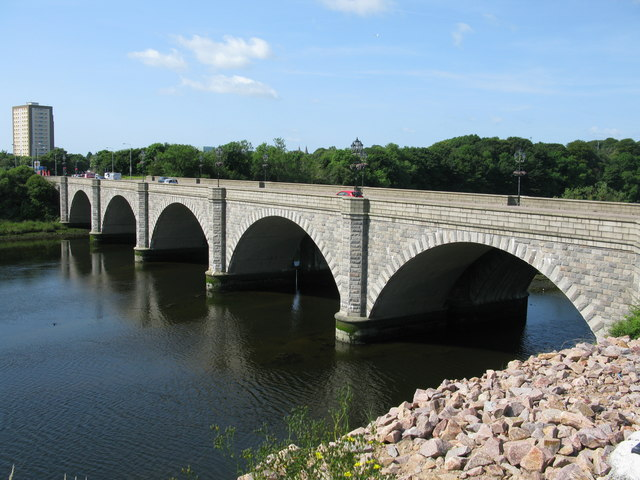
- Bridge of Don in 2017
- Coordinates: 57.17548°N 2.09060°W
- OS grid reference: NJ 94621 09426
- Carries: A956
- Crosses: River Don
- Locale: Aberdeen
- Preceded by: Brig o' Balgownie

Characteristics
- Material: Granite
- Width: 66 feet (20 m)
- Longest span: 75 feet (23 m)
- No. of spans: 5

History
- Construction start: 1827
- Construction end: 1830

Listed Building – Category B
- Official name: Bridge Of Don, King Street
- Designated: 12 January 1967
- Reference no.: LB20069

Location
- Interactive map of Bridge of Don

Bridge of Don is a five-arch bridge of granite, built between 1827 and 1830, crossing the River Don just above its mouth in Aberdeen, Scotland.

== History ==
In 1605 Alexander Hay executed a Charter of Mortification for the maintenance of the 13th century Brig o' Balgownie further upstream, which later became the Bridge of Don Fund, which financed several bridges in the north-east of Scotland. This fund having accumulated a value of over £20,000, the patrons of the fund, the town council, sought an Act of Parliament to permit construction of a new bridge in 1825.

The original design by John Gibb and John Smith was modified by Thomas Telford, and construction work started in 1827. Problems with the foundations meant it had to be partly taken down and have additional piles sunk. It was opened free to the public with no toll in 1830 and later gave its name to the suburb of the city on the north bank.

It was listed as a Category B listed building in 1967.

== Design ==
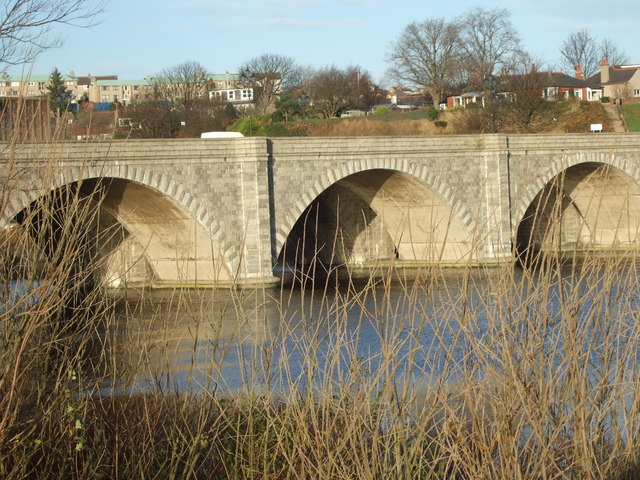
The two different bridges can be seen here

The bridge has five spans of dressed granite, and rounded cutwaters that carry up to road level to form pedestrian refuges. The spans are 75 feet (23 m), with a rise of 25 feet (7.6 m).

It was widened in 1958-59, from 24 feet (7.3 m), to 66 feet (20 m) by the construction of a new concrete bridge adjacent to the old one.

It now carries four lanes of the A956 road, and is the last bridge on the River Don before it meets the North Sea. The bridge is just downstream from a substantial island in the river. Around the area of the bridge is the Donmouth Local Nature Reserve, designated as a LNR in 1992. Near to the bridge are a number of World War II era coastal defences, including a pill box.

== See also ==
- List of bridges in Scotland
- Transport in Aberdeen
