= Tarves =

Settlement in Aberdeenshire, Scotland

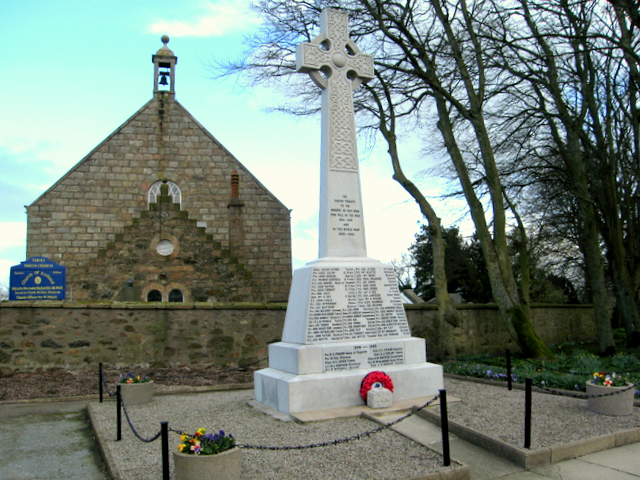
- Tarves war memorial and church

- Location within Aberdeenshire
- Population: 1,080 (2020)
- Council area: Aberdeenshire
- Country: Scotland
- Sovereign state: United Kingdom
- Post town: ELLON
- Postcode district: AB41
- Dialling code: 01651
- Police: Scotland
- Fire: Scottish
- Ambulance: Scottish
- UK Parliament: Gordon and Buchan
- Scottish Parliament: Aberdeenshire East

Tarves (/ˈtɑːrvɪs/) is a settlement in Aberdeenshire, Scotland, situated in the Formartine area. It is 5.8 miles (9.3 km) from Oldmeldrum to the south-west, and 5.0 miles (8.0 km) Methlick to the north.

== History ==
Tarves is situated close to:

- Cromlech South Ythsie Druid stone circle (57.363925°N 2.192818°E), 1.17 miles (1.88 km) to the east;
- late-16th-century Tolquhon Castle, 1.61 miles (2.59 km) to the south;
- 1732 Haddo House, former home of the Earls of Aberdeen, 1.61 miles (2.59 km) to the north; and
- 1862 Prop of Ythsie (57.373500°N 2.194028°W), a tower to the memory of the 4th Earl of Aberdeen, 1 mile (1.6 km) to the east.

A Bronze Age hoard of weapons was found near Tarves in the nineteenth century and was donated by the Earl of Aberdeen to the British Museum in 1858. Dating to between 1000 and 850 BC, the hoard was made entirely from bronze and consists of three swords, a pommel, a chape and two pins (two items of which were not part of the original gift and are now lost).

The Tolquhon Tomb memorial is the graveyard of the Church of Scotland Tarves Parish Church. A war memorial from World War I and World War II records those from the parish who died in the wars.

Much of the Tarves settlement was planned and laid out by the Marquess of Aberdeen in the 19th century.

Agricultural productivity was always being examined, including in 1905, a commission of Scottish tenant farmers including one from Tarves, went to Denmark to inspect the practicalities of 'condensed farming', including crop rotations through fields.

In 1914, shorthorn cattle were being bred on several farms including those of William S. Marr and the Duthies. "Shorthorn King" William Duthie at Collynie were considered one of the best in the country, who died at the age of 82 in 1923. The 1944 death of his famous shorthorn breeder nephew (J)ohn Duthie Webster was acknowledged as far as Australia. Clydesdales were part of the farm life at this time. Prize-winning bulls were still being produced in the 1950s, mainly by James Durno. (The Uppermill farm after five Durno generations was advertised for sale in 2020.)

In 1939 the structure of the British Army in 1939 included at Tarves the Gordon Highlanders, 7th (Mars and Mearns) Battalion, 27th Infantry Brigade, 9th (Highland) Infantry Division, Scottish Command.

During World War II one local soldier who had joined the Gordon Highlanders became one of the bodyguard to Field Marshall Bernard Montgomery. Another local "became the RAF's most decorated air gunner" during the war, having flown 55 missions as an Avro Lancaster rear gunner of No. 207 Squadron RAF of Bomber Command.

In May 1952, an RAF military de Havilland Canada DHC-1 Chipmunk T.10 aircraft left RAF Dyce. About 2 miles (3.2 km) north-west of Tarves on the grounds of the Haddo House Home Farm, the aircraft failed to recover from a spin, and the squadron leader and cadet pilot both died in the impact on a farm.

Research in 2004 suggested Elvis Presley's ancestors of the 18th and 19th centuries were living in Tarves and other villages.

In late 2025, as a result of new housing developments, the village population grew to over 1,000 residents, making Tarves a town.

== Tarves today ==
Tarves Primary School and Nursery in 2026 catered for 167 school students, and 19 pre-school students. Once completing schooling in the town, students continue at Meldrum Academy.

With a town centre of The Square, there is the school, and a church nearby. Apart from the Aberdeen Arms public hotel, and post office, Carnegie Reading Room, Melvin Hall community hall, there is the Tarves Heritage Centre. Opened in 2004, the centre was part of a Victorian-era school building.

People living in Tarves may work in Aberdeen which is only 18.1 miles (29.1 km) away to the south.

== Notable persons ==
- Catherine Gordon (1718–1779), wife of 3rd Duke of Gordon, born at Haddo.
- Alexander Irvine (1818–1892), Laird of Drum, advocate and philosopher.
- George Mackie (1919–2015), British Liberal and Liberal Democrat politician. Born in Tarves.
- Duncan Mearns (1779–1852), minister of Tarves (1799–1816), later Moderator of the General Assembly of the Church of Scotland.
- William Smyth (1857–1932), Canadian merchant and political figure. Born in Tarves.
- John Strachan (1875–1958), farmer and traditional singer. Resided at Tarves for a short period.

== See also ==
- People from Tarves
