= Drum Castle =

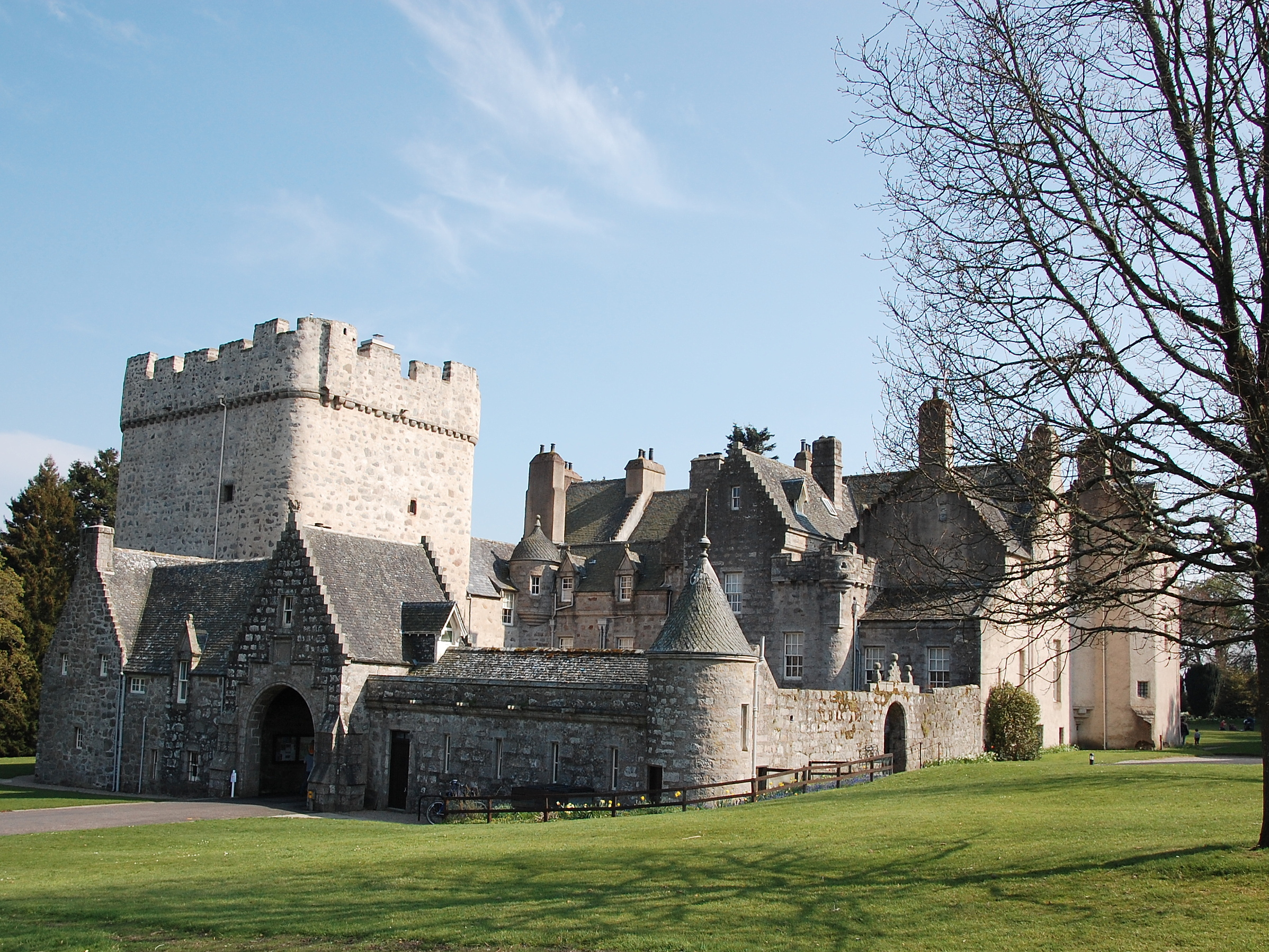
- Drum Castle in 2016

- Location within Aberdeenshire

General information
- Type: Tower house
- Location: Drumoak, Aberdeenshire, Scotland
- Coordinates: 57.09503°N 2.33794°W

Inventory of Gardens and Designed Landscapes in Scotland
- Official name: Drum Castle
- Designated: 1 July 1987
- Reference no.: GDL00141
- Construction started: 13th Century
- Owner: National Trust for Scotland

Design and construction
- Architect: possibly Richard Cementarius

Drum Castle is a castle near Drumoak in Aberdeenshire, Scotland. For centuries it was the seat of the chief of Clan Irvine. The place-name Drum is derived from Gaelic druim, 'ridge'. The site is located approximately 6 1/2 miles (10.5 kilometres) northeast of Banchory and 3 miles (5 kilometres) west of Peterculter. The property is now owned by the National Trust for Scotland and is open to the public.

== History ==
The original 13th-century tower of Drum Castle has been suggested as the work of medieval architect Richard Cementarius, who built the Brig o' Balgownie, the first Bridge of Don, in Old Aberdeen. It is believed to be one of the three oldest tower houses in Scotland (and notably unaltered).

The castle and its grounds were granted to William de Irwyn in 1323 by Robert the Bruce, and remained in the possession of Clan Irvine until 1975. William de Irwyn (of the Irvings of Bonshaw clan) was armour bearer/secretary (and neighbour) to King Robert the Bruce.

When Mary, Queen of Scots, was travelling near Aberdeen in August 1564 she sent a messenger to the Laird of Drum asking him to make provisions for her, and may have visited the castle. A large wing was added in 1619 by the 9th laird of Drum, and further alterations were made during the Victorian era. In June 1636, Sir Alexander Irvine of Drum and his wife Magdalene Scrimgeour were censured for harbouring the outlaw Gilderoy. Drum played a role in the Covenanting Rebellion (as did nearby Muchalls Castle) leading to its being attacked and sacked three times.

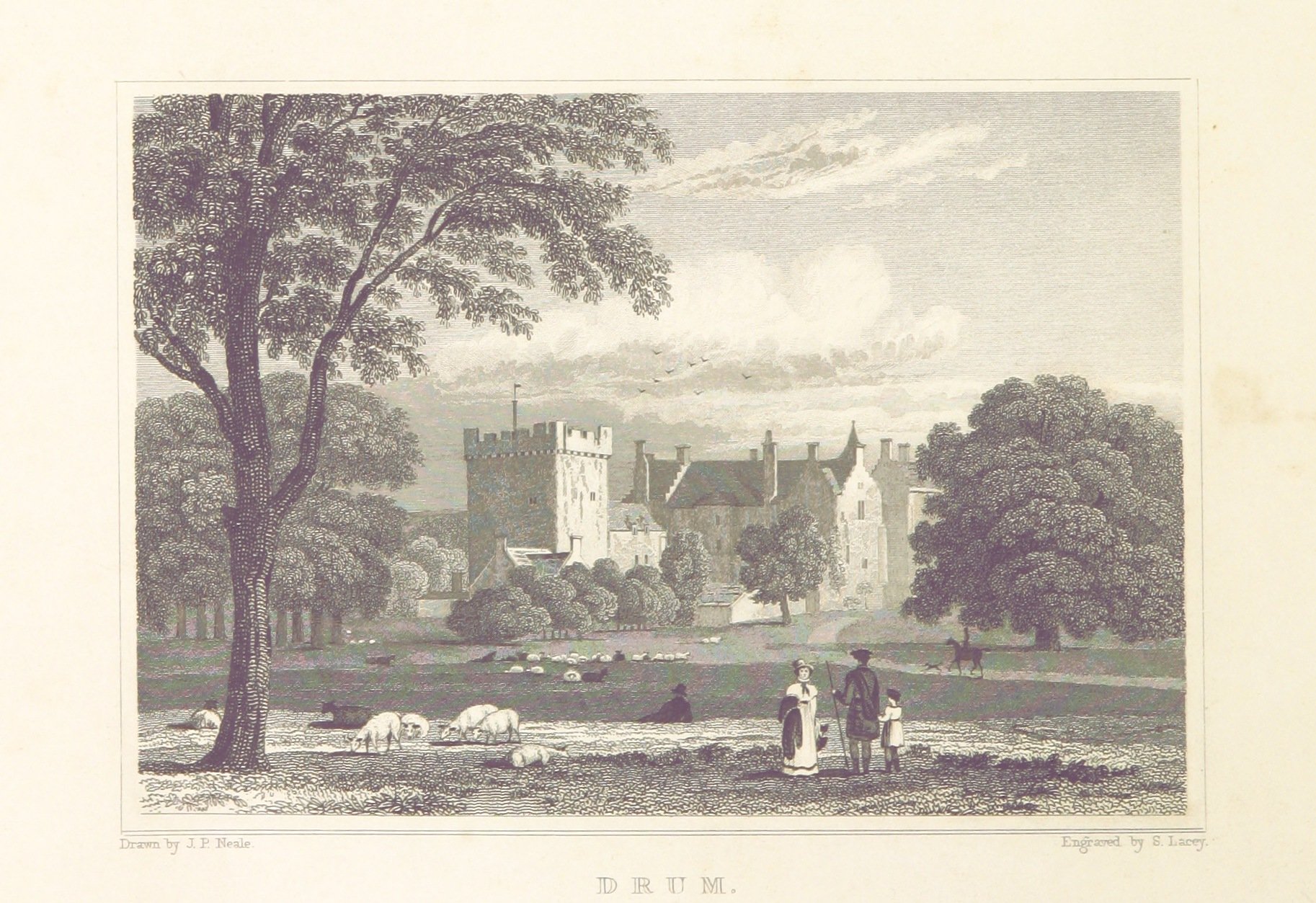
The castle in 1829 (by John Preston Neale)

In the 19th century, it was the home of Alexander Forbes Irvine of Drum. He had inherited the estate in 1861, on the death of his father. In 1875/1876, he arranged for a restoration of the courtyard, and the addition of an arched entrance and angle tower. He was also partly responsible for a restoration of the chapel.

There was an older church located here; it was modified to create the chapel in the 1500s and 1600s. In 1857, the west window was enlarged and the cross was added; a new roof was also installed and some restoration of the interior was completed.

The site was once served by Drum railway station on the Deeside Railway. Service was discontinued in 1951.

== Recent status ==
The castle has been a Category-A Listed property since 1987. The report states that the agreement with the National Trust was made in 1964 by Mr H.Q. Forbes Irvine, the 24th Laird, and that the agreement came into force in 1976, after 650 years of ownership by the Irvine Lairds. The summary states that the tower was built in 1280–1300, that the Jacobean Wing was added in 1619 and that modifications were made ca. 1800, 1840 and 1875. The Chapel is Category-B Listed as are the Walled Garden and East Lodge; in 1987, the garden was "derelict".

The chapel, dining hall and estate may be hired for weddings and corporate functions. The current (early 2020) NTS website, however, discusses its Garden of Historic Roses, spread out over four distinct areas. The grand Victorian library with over 4,000 books was one of the attractions; the castle was also offering a "programme of temporary exhibitions throughout the year". A tourism website added that the castle "contains superb furniture and paintings. In the 16th-century chapel are a beautiful stained glass window and the Augsburg silver Madonna". The site has a playground, a small shop and a tearoom.

The castle, gardens and estate are open to visitors throughout the year. During 2019, 47,446 people visited the castle.

== Area's ancient history ==
Prehistoric habitation of the local area is known through archaeological sites such as Balbridie. Roman legions marched from Raedykes to nearby Normandykes as they sought higher ground evading the bogs of Red Moss and other low-lying mosses associated with the Burn of Muchalls. That march used the Elsick Mounth, one of the ancient trackways crossing the Grampian Mountains; the situation of the Elsick Mounth terminating at a ford to the River Dee is thought to have been instrumental in the strategic siting of Drum Castle as a point to monitor traffic on the Elsick Mounth lying west of Netherley.

== Gallery ==
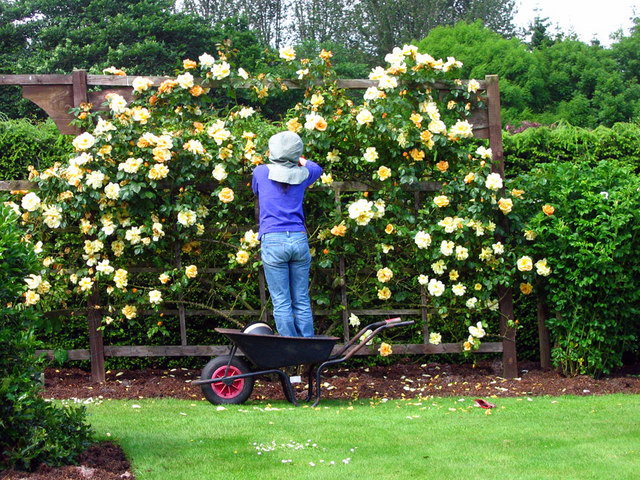
The Rose Garden at Drum Castle

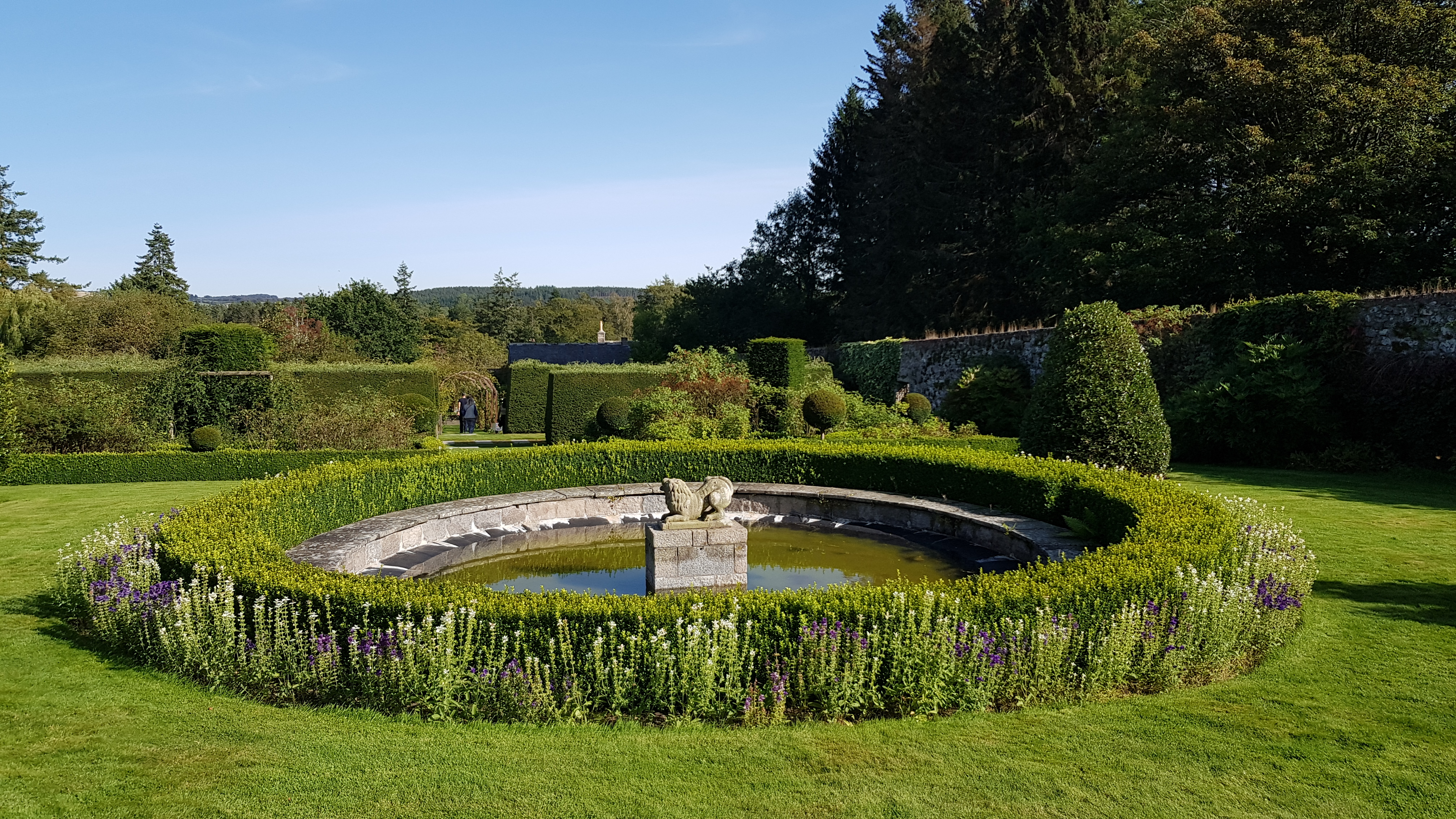
Walled Garden, Drum Castle

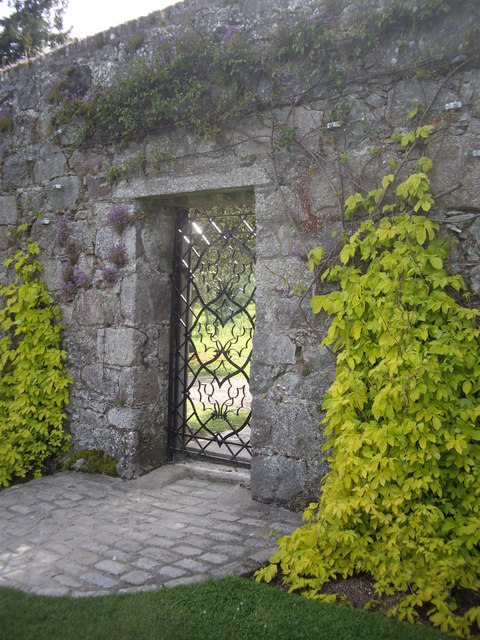
Gateway of the Walled Garden at Drum Castle

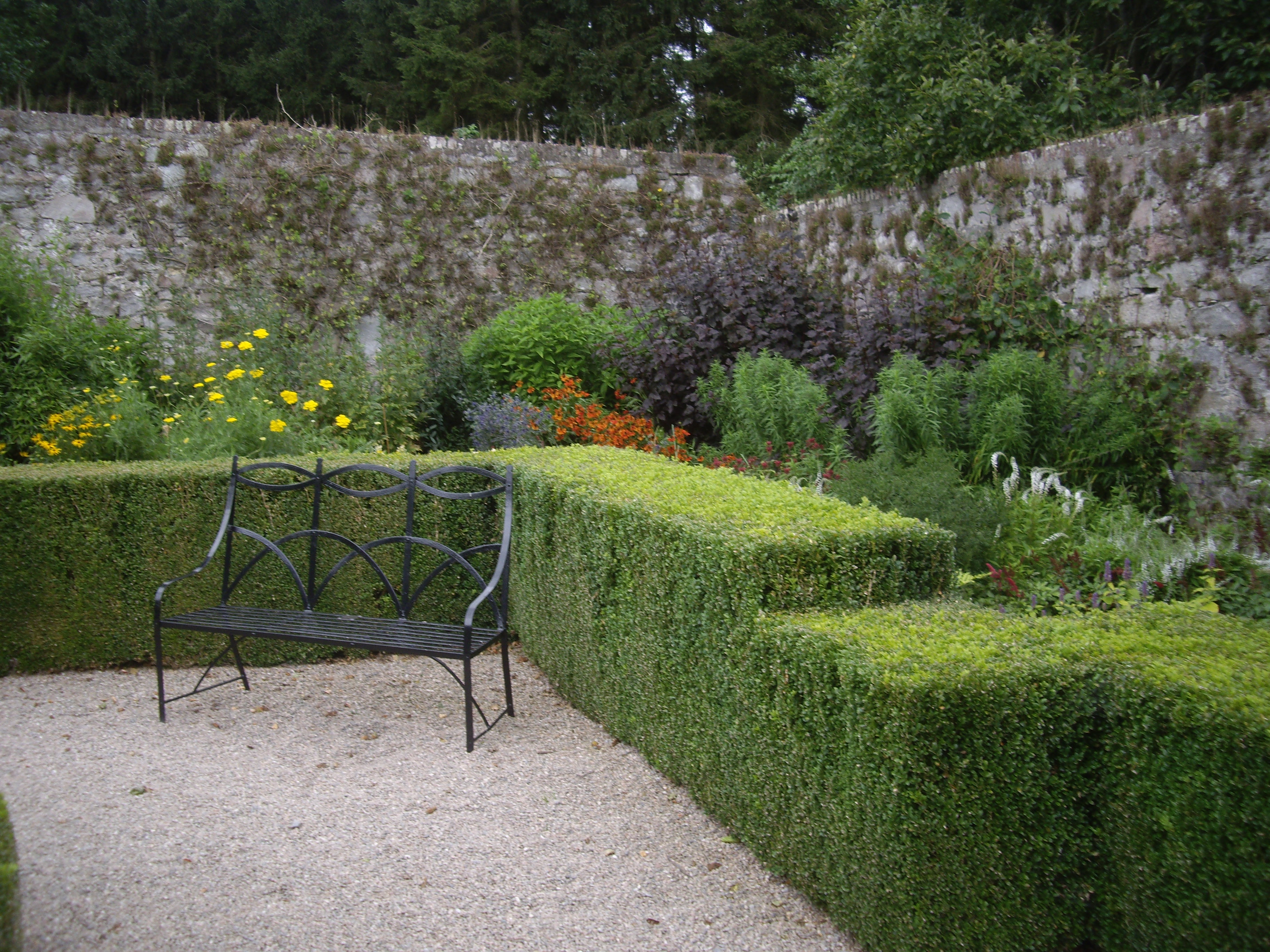
North-East corner of the Walled Garden at Drum Castle

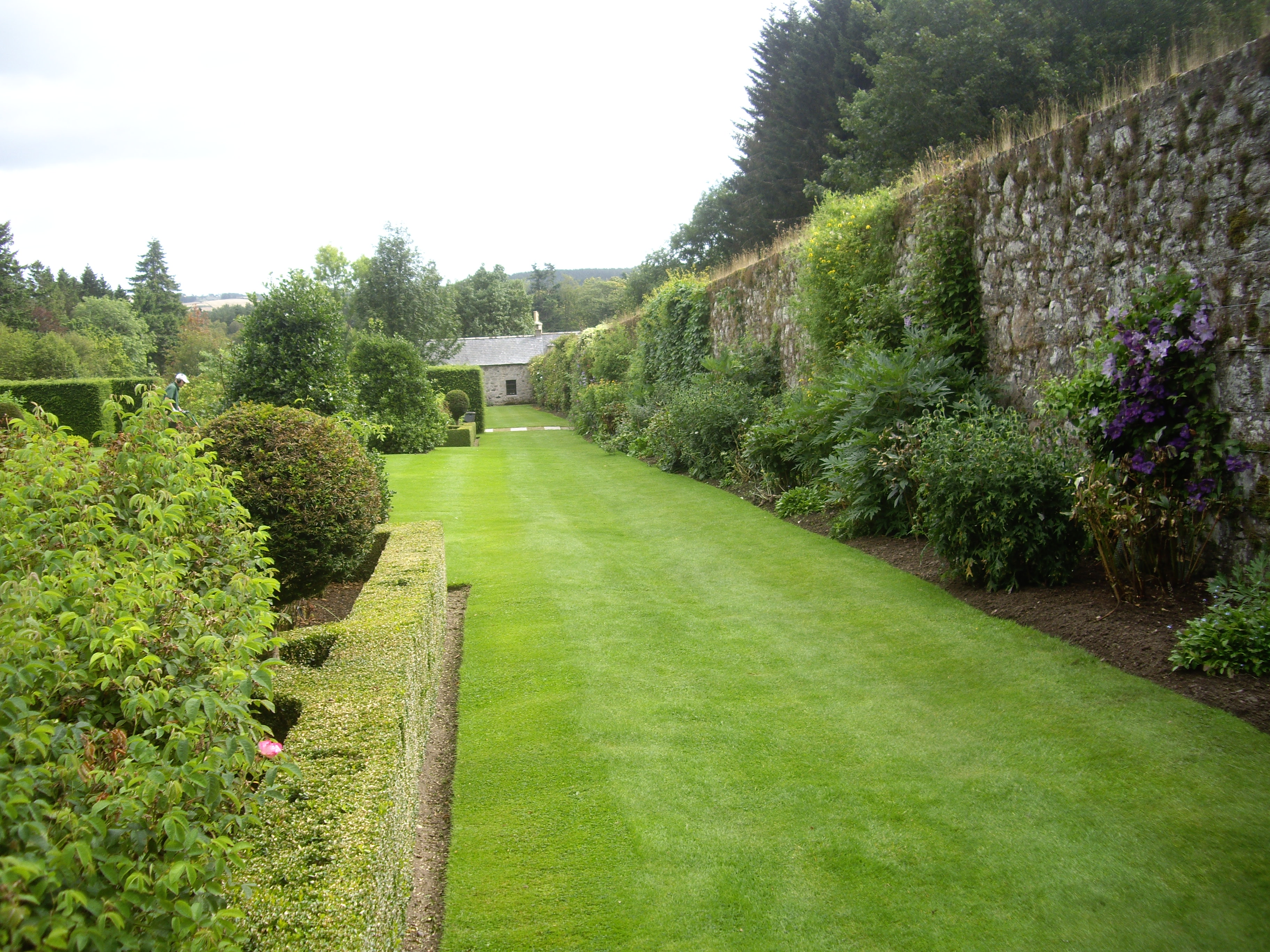
Southern boundary of the Walled Garden at Drum Castle

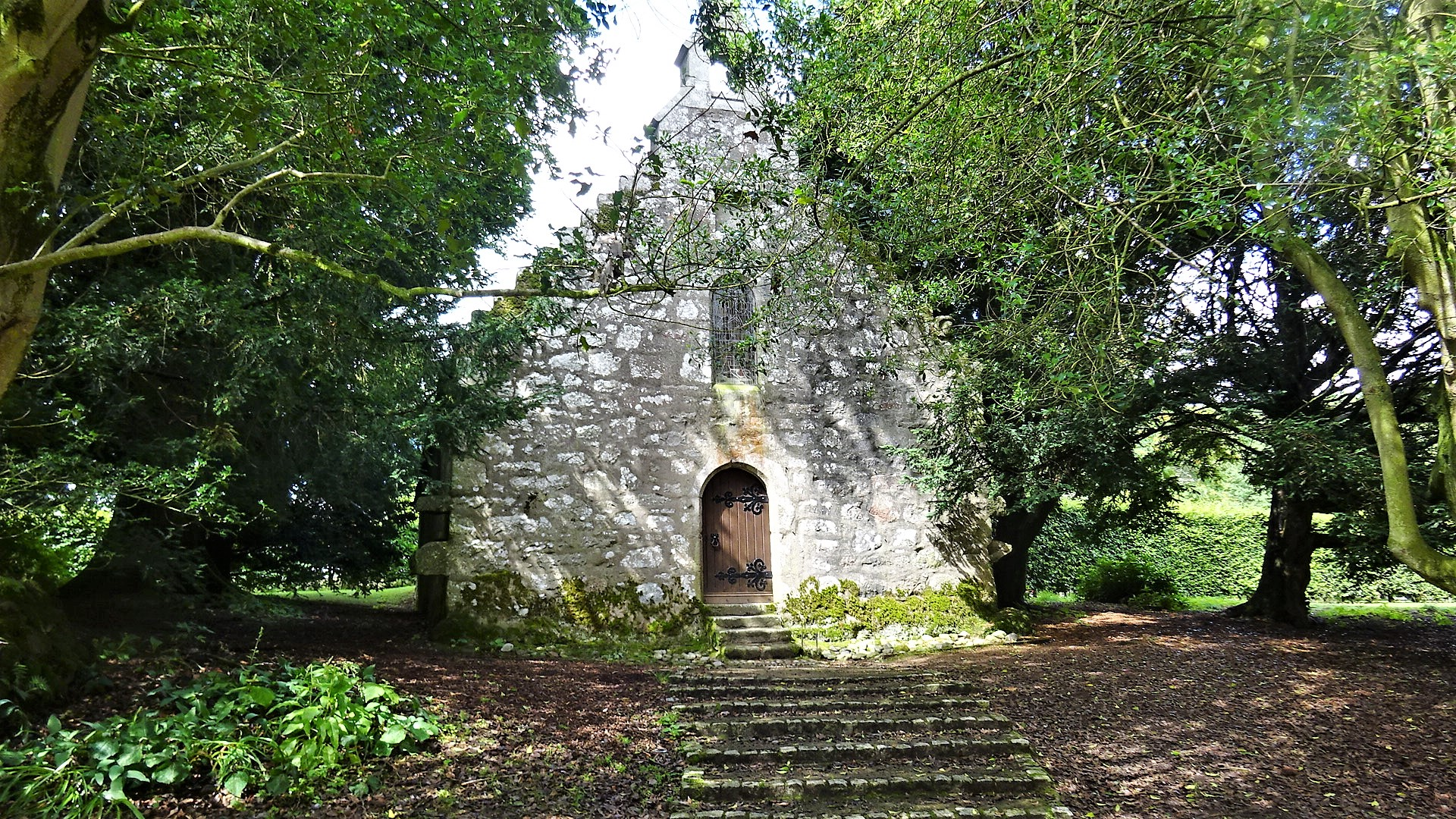
Drum Castle Chapel

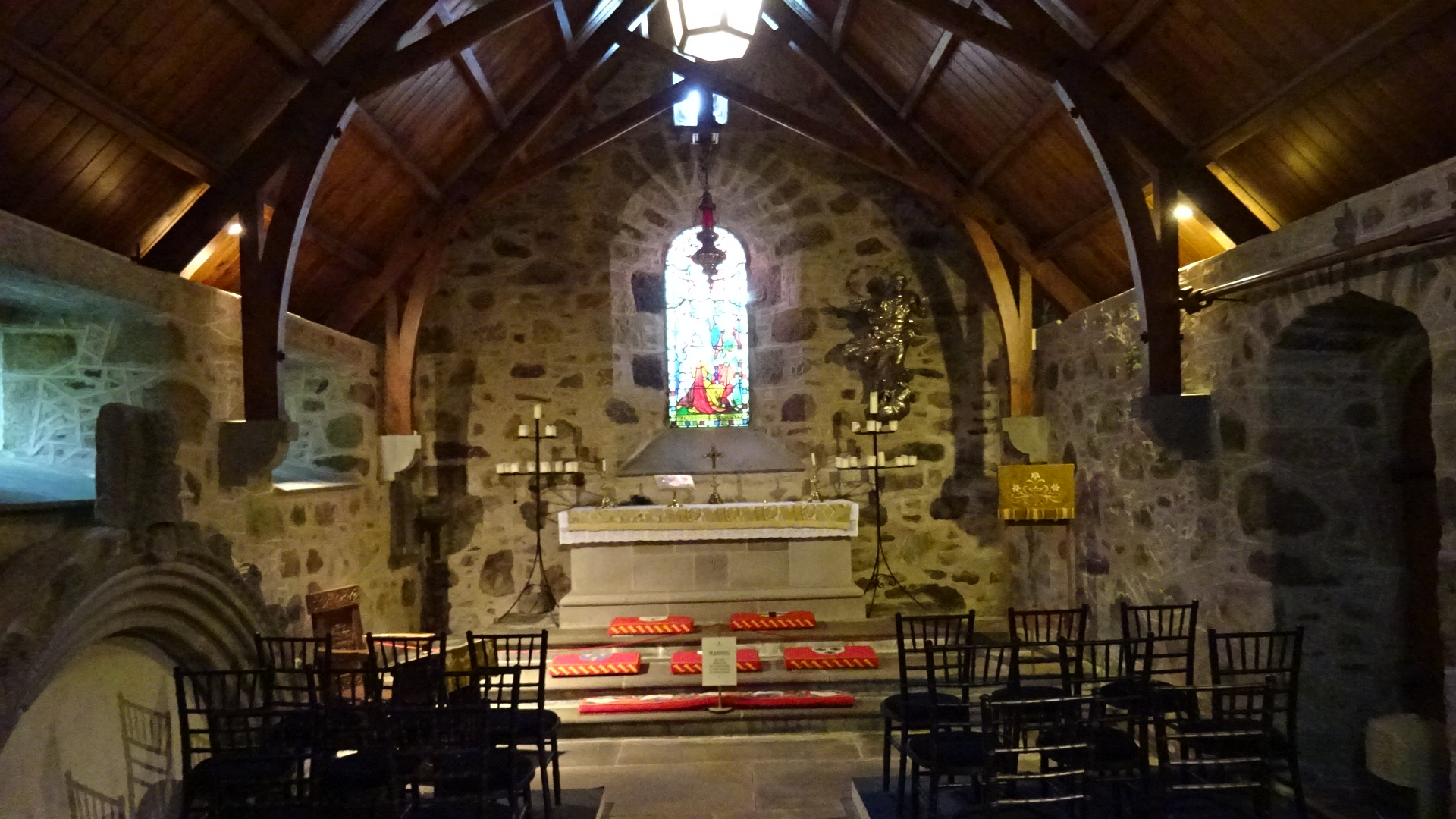
Drum Castle chapel Interior & Altar
