= Tobermory High School =

Coordinates: 56°37′28″N 6°4′7″W

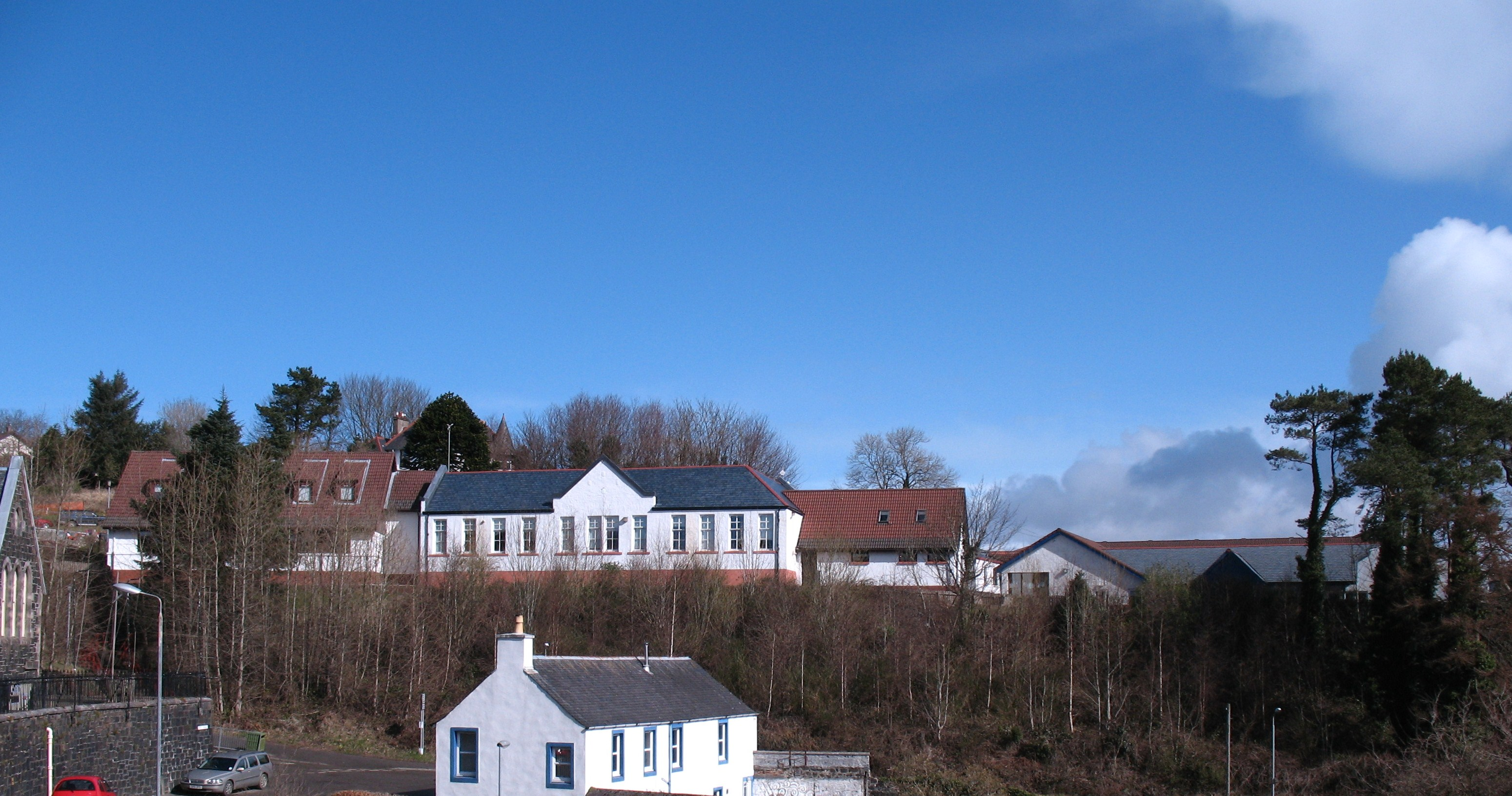
- Tobermory, Isle of Mull, PA75 6PB; Scotland

Information
- Type: Local Authority, All-through School
- Local authority: Argyll & Bute Council
- Head teacher: Shelley Carmichael
- Age: 3 to 18
- Publication: THS Press
- Website: tobermoryhighschool.co.uk

Tobermory High School (Scottish Gaelic: Àrd-sgoil Thobar Mhoire) is the only secondary school on the Isle of Mull. It is located in Tobermory, at the northern end of the island.

Its feeder primary schools are at Tobermory, Salen, Dervaig, Lochdon (near Craignure), and Ulva Ferry. Although it is an Argyll and Bute council school, it also takes pupils from Kilchoan on the mainland, which is linked to Tobermory by ferry.

The former head of the school is Jennifer McGhee who retired in October 2020. Richard Gawthrope then became the head teacher of Tobermory High School, starting the job in October 2020 following 12 years as deputy head teacher at the school. In 2022, Richard Gawthrope moved on from Tobermory High School and Shelley Carmichael took over as head teacher.
