= Old Rayne =

Village in Aberdeenshire, Scotland

Coordinates: 57.34°N 2.54°W

Old Rayne: Scottish Gaelic: Raon
- Location within Aberdeenshire
- OS grid reference: NJ675284
- Council area: Aberdeenshire
- Lieutenancy area: Aberdeenshire
- Country: Scotland
- Sovereign state: United Kingdom
- Post town: INSCH
- Postcode district: AB52
- Dialling code: 01464
- Police: Scotland
- Fire: Scottish
- Ambulance: Scottish
- UK Parliament: Gordon and Buchan
- Scottish Parliament: Aberdeenshire West

Old Rayne is a small village in Aberdeenshire, Scotland, approximately 9 miles (14 kilometres) north west of Inverurie and 14 mi (23 km) south east of Huntly along the A96 road.

== Geography ==
Old Rayne is bordered by the River Ury.

== Etymology ==
The word "Rayne" comes from the Scottish Gaelic Raon meaning "a field of good ground". In the area around Old Rayne are other settlements including Kirton of Rayne, Rayne North and Potts of Rayne.

== Prehistory ==
A bronze age stone circle dating from approx 3000BC lies 500m south east of the village. Excavations in 1856 unearthed cremations, pottery, and a greenstone archer's wristguard.

== History ==
The lands of Rayne were granted to the bishops of Aberdeen in 1137. The Bishops then built a residence in Old Rayne, the Bishop's Manor. This was a stone building with a moat that would have been very expensive to build at that time. It was thought by Boece, in Historia Gentis Scotorum, to have been built by Alexander de Kininmund, bishop between 1329 and 1344. However excavations in 1990 and 2008, in advance of development, found that there was already a building on the site in the early 14th century.

Old Rayne became a burgh of barony in 1492 and it was part of the lands taken from the bishops of Aberdeen under the Act of Annexation of 1587. The archaeological work indicates that the Bishop's Manor was then abandoned and quarried, with stones reused in buildings elsewhere in the village.

== Lourin Fair and ORCA ==
The village hosts Lourin Fair, a traditional country fair dating back some 500 years, held annually on the third Saturday in August. Lourin Fair is well attended and quite unusual including traditional elements such as Clydesdale Horse competition/parade; bothy concert; pipe band; It's a knockout; homecraft & produce competition; demonstrations; traditional children's games; vintage vehicles and tea/coffee with "fancy pieces".

The fair is organised by the Old Rayne Community Association (ORCA), a registered charity raising funds for community projects; the upkeep of the village hall and supporting local organisations including Toddlers; Playgroup; Scouts; Bowling and Ospreys football.

== Language ==
Old Rayne natives speak the Aberdeenshire Doric dialect of Scots.

== Religion ==
The nearest church is Rayne Church, Church of Scotland. The parish is "Culsalmond and Rayne linked with Daviot".

== Education ==
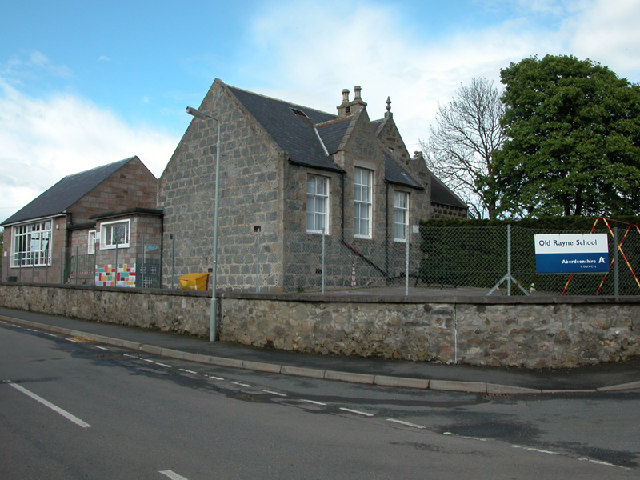
Old Rayne Primary School in 2005

There is one primary school, located centrally in the village, with the associated secondary school Meldrum Academy, a short bus journey away to Oldmeldrum.

== Famous residents ==
- Robert Forbes (1708–1775), was a native of Old Rayne, a bishop of the Non-juring Scottish Episcopal Church, and an early historian of the Jacobite rising of 1745.
