= Ellon Academy =

School in Ellon, Aberdeenshire, Scotland

Coordinates: 57°21′32″N 2°3′32″W

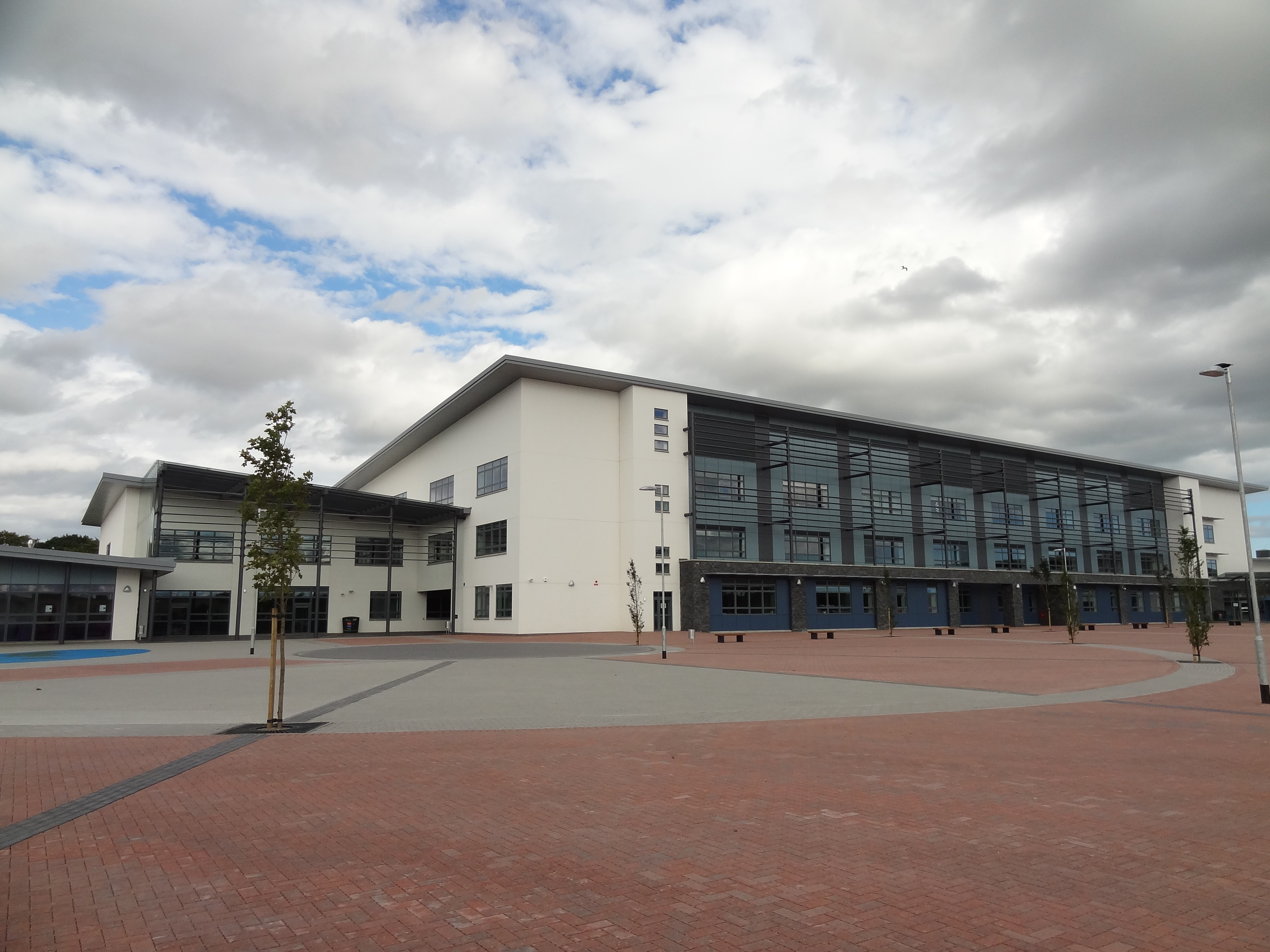

Location
- Kelly Pearl Way; Ellon, Aberdeenshire, AB41 8LF; Scotland

Information
- Type: State coeducational secondary
- Motto: Famam extendite factis (Extend your reputation by deed)
- Established: 22 May 1876; 150 years ago
- Local authority: Aberdeenshire Council
- Rector: Thom Sherrington
- Staff: 89 FTE
- Years: S1 - S6
- Enrolment: 1150
- Colour: Black
- Feeder schools: Arnage Primary; Auchterellon Primary; Ellon Primary; Foveran Primary; Meiklemill Primary; Newburgh Primary; Slains Primary; Tipperty Primary; Hatton (Cruden) Primary
- Website: ellonacademy.aberdeenshire.sch.uk
- Last updated: 11 January 2024

Ellon Academy is a secondary comprehensive school in the Aberdeenshire town of Ellon. In August 2015, the school moved to its new purpose-built campus to the south of the town.

== History ==
Founded as Ellon Public School, the building was opened on 22 May 1876. It was responsible for the education of both primary and secondary students; in 1962 the two were split into separate sites. Ellon Public School was overseen by headmaster William Cooper. It had 6 classrooms, male and female. During the early years, the overcrowding problem, that has haunted the school for years, started to become clear, and it was decided that a second storey would be built. During the 24-year wait for the construction to begin, Ellon Public School became Ellon Secondary School. The second floor was completed in 1911.

It turned out to be only a temporary cure for the growing problem of congestion. With more pupils coming in every year, the school was facing a crisis. In the late 1930s, the famous bell tower, and headmaster's office, were destroyed to make room for a second extension.

The name Ellon Academy was first used from 23 August 1948, with a second building on a separate site being constructed in 1979.

In 2002, to reduce pressures on the Ellon Academy and the Inverurie Academy, the Meldrum Academy was established.

In 2005, the Education and Recreation department of Aberdeenshire Council began investigating the consolidation of the school at a single site. In September 2009, the Scottish Government announced that the academy would be one of fourteen secondary schools in Scotland to be rebuilt as part of a £1.25 billion programme.

In 2015, the school was relocated to the new purpose-built Ellon Academy Community Campus on Kelly Pearl Way to the south of the town. The old building was demolished.

== Today ==
The school has an estimated 1,068 pupils and a teaching staff of 89 FTE. The school is headed by Head Teacher Thom Sherrington, who succeeded Pauline Buchan in 2024.

Ellon Academy won the Scottish Executive Education Award in 2002 in the category "Schools for All".

Ellon Academy was made a case point during a First Minister's Questions, where it was criticized for its split campus layout and general disrepair. This prompted a visitation from Labour MSPs, and later from STV and BBC television crews.

In November 2008, Ellon Academy was awarded the Eco-Schools Green Flag, the organisation's highest award, which accredits schools for their actions helping the environment. In January 2011, Ellon Academy was awarded a second Green Flag.

In June 2010, Ellon Academy was shortlisted in the Global Citizenship Award category of the 2010 Scottish Education Awards.

On 14 September 2012, Ellon Academy broke the world record for the largest "Superman" dance. This was part of the recent 80's themed "Party In the Park" school fundraiser. Ellon academy also holds the world record for the longest sandcastle by Peter Stewart

On 10 June 2013 Head Librarian Jan Murdoch was named Educational Supporter of the Year 2013 at the Scottish Education Awards in Glasgow.

== Notable former pupils ==
- Johanna Basford (born 1983), illustrator, artist and business woman.
- Yvie Burnett (born 1968), vocal coach The X-Factor, Britain's Got Talent.
- Rebecca Dempster (born 1991), footballer.
- Evelyn Glennie (born 1965), virtuosa percussionist.
- Gillian Martin, Scottish politician since 2016.
- Tom Patey (1932—1970), climber, mountaineer and writer.
- Andrew Wilson (born 1980), rugby union player.
