= Methlick =

Village in Aberdeenshire, Scotland

Coordinates: 57.425°N 2.240°W

Methlick: Scottish Gaelic: Maothulach
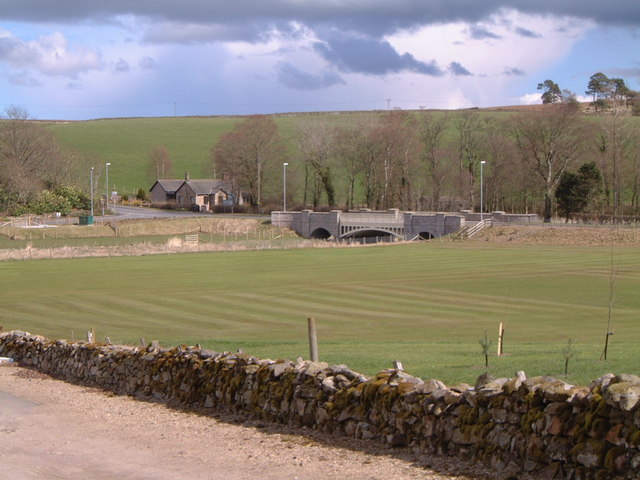
- Methlick Bridge, the cast-iron span erected in 1844 and refurbished in 2003

- Location within Aberdeenshire
- Population: 530 (2020)
- OS grid reference: NJ857372
- Council area: Aberdeenshire
- Lieutenancy area: Aberdeenshire
- Country: Scotland
- Sovereign state: United Kingdom
- Post town: ELLON
- Postcode district: AB41
- Dialling code: 01651
- Police: Scotland
- Fire: Scottish
- Ambulance: Scottish
- UK Parliament: Gordon and Buchan
- Scottish Parliament: Aberdeenshire East

Methlick (Scottish Gaelic: Maothulach) is a village in the Formartine area of Aberdeenshire, Scotland, situated on the River Ythan 11.2 km north-west of Ellon.

== Services ==
Methlick is served by a parish church, a general store, a garage, a Chinese takeaway, a hotel, and a village hall. There is a primary school, with secondary pupils travelling to Meldrum Academy in Oldmeldrum 11.3 kilometres (7.0 mi) away. Methlick also features a play park, renovated in 2013, providing a range of play equipment for all ages. Methlick Community Council has dedicated time to fundraise and build an all-weather multi-use games area (MUGA) within their King George V Park. These facilities are free for anyone within and outside of the Methlick community to use.

== Transport ==
The village is situated at the intersection of the B9005 road from Ellon to Fyvie and the B9170 road from Inverurie to New Deer, both routes crossing the River Ythan at Methlick Bridge.

Methlick is served by several bus services operated by Stagecoach North Scotland, including routes connecting the village with Aberdeen, Ellon and Inverurie.

== Community ==
Methlick Community Council represents local views to the principal local authority, Aberdeenshire Council.

A community website provides local information, news and events.

== Places of interest ==
Haddo House, a stately home and arts venue with theatre and concert hall, lies 2.7 kilometres (1.7 mi) to the southeast of Methlick.

Gight Castle, ancestral home of Lord Byron, lies 4.3 kilometres (2.7 mi) to the west.

== Sport ==
Methlick has a cricket team, Methlick Cricket Club, which competes in the Aberdeenshire Cricket Association and plays its home matches at Lairds in the village.

Methlick has a football club, Methlick Football Club, which competes in local welfare football competitions under the North East Scotland Football Association.

== Notable people ==
- Evelyn Glennie, percussionist, who grew up on the family farm near Methlick.
