= List of United Kingdom locations: Co-Col =

The United Kingdom

This is part of the list of United Kingdom locations: a gazetteer of place names in the United Kingdom showing each place's locality and geographical coordinates.

== Co ==
=== Coa ===
Location	Locality	Coordinates (links to map & photo sources)	OS grid reference
Coad's Green	Cornwall	50.55°N 04.41°W	SX2976
Coal Aston	Derbyshire	53.30°N 01.46°W	SK3679
Coal Bank	Darlington	54.58°N 01.45°W	NZ3521
Coalbrookdale	Shropshire	52.63°N 02.50°W	SJ6604
Coalbrookvale	Blaenau Gwent	51.77°N 03.17°W	SO1909
Coalburn	South Lanarkshire	55.58°N 03.88°W	NS8134
Coalburns	Gateshead	54.94°N 01.81°W	NZ1261
Coalcleugh	Northumberland	54.79°N 02.31°W	NY8045
Coaley	Gloucestershire	51.70°N 02.33°W	SO7701
Coaley Peak	Gloucestershire	51.70°N 02.30°W	SO7901
Coalford	City of Aberdeen	57.08°N 02.29°W	NO8299
Coalhall	East Ayrshire	55.44°N 04.46°W	NS4419
Coalhill	Essex	51.64°N 00.52°E	TQ7597
Coalmoor	Shropshire	52.65°N 02.50°W	SJ6607
Coalpit Field	Warwickshire	52.47°N 01.47°W	SP3686
Coalpit Heath	South Gloucestershire	51.51°N 02.47°W	ST6780
Coalpit Hill	Staffordshire	53.07°N 02.27°W	SJ8253
Coal Pool	Walsall	52.59°N 01.98°W	SK0100
Coalport	Shropshire	52.61°N 02.45°W	SJ6902
Coalsnaughton	Clackmannan	56.13°N 03.73°W	NS9295
Coaltown of Balgonie	Fife	56.17°N 03.12°W	NT3099
Coaltown of Burnturk	Fife	56.25°N 03.09°W	NO3207
Coaltown of Wemyss	Fife	56.14°N 03.09°W	NT3295
Coalville	Leicestershire	52.71°N 01.37°W	SK4213
Coalway	Gloucestershire	51.78°N 02.61°W	SO5810
Coanwood	Northumberland	54.92°N 02.50°W	NY6859
Coarsewell	Devon	50.37°N 03.82°W	SX7054
Coat	Somerset	50.97°N 02.78°W	ST4520
Coatbridge	North Lanarkshire	55.86°N 04.04°W	NS7265
Coatdyke	North Lanarkshire	55.85°N 03.99°W	NS7564
Coate	Swindon	51.53°N 01.74°W	SU1882
Coate	Wiltshire	51.34°N 01.94°W	SU0461
Coates	Cambridgeshire	52.55°N 00.08°W	TL3097
Coates	Gloucestershire	51.69°N 02.03°W	SO9800
Coates	Lancashire	53.91°N 02.18°W	SD8847
Coates	Lincolnshire	53.33°N 00.63°W	SK9183
Coates	Midlothian	55.83°N 03.26°W	NT2161
Coates	Nottinghamshire	53.31°N 00.77°W	SK8281
Coates	West Sussex	50.94°N 00.59°W	SU9917
Coatham	Redcar and Cleveland	54.61°N 01.08°W	NZ5925
Coatham Mundeville	Darlington	54.57°N 01.56°W	NZ2820

=== Cob ===
Location	Locality	Coordinates (links to map & photo sources)	OS grid reference
Cobb	Devon	50.71°N 02.95°W	SY3391
Cobbaton	Devon	51.01°N 03.98°W	SS6126
Cobbler's Green	Norfolk	52.47°N 01.35°E	TM2892
Cobbler's Plain	Monmouthshire	51.69°N 02.76°W	SO4700
Cobbs	Cheshire	53.36°N 02.58°W	SJ6185
Cobb's Cross	Gloucestershire	51.99°N 02.35°W	SO7633
Cobbs Fenn	Essex	51.96°N 00.57°E	TL7733
Cobby Syke	North Yorkshire	53.99°N 01.71°W	SE1955
Coberley	Gloucestershire	51.84°N 02.05°W	SO9616
Cobhall Common	Herefordshire	52.01°N 02.80°W	SO4535
Cobham	Kent	51.38°N 00.39°E	TQ6768
Cobham	Surrey	51.32°N 00.40°W	TQ1160
Cobholm Island	Norfolk	52.60°N 01.70°E	TG5107
Cobler's Green	Essex	51.84°N 00.43°E	TL6819
Cobley	Dorset	50.97°N 01.97°W	SU0220
Cobley Hill	Worcestershire	52.33°N 01.98°W	SP0171
Cobnash	Herefordshire	52.23°N 02.80°W	SO4560
Cobridge	City of Stoke-on-Trent	53.02°N 02.19°W	SJ8748
Cobscot	Shropshire	52.93°N 02.47°W	SJ6838

=== Coc ===
Location	Locality	Coordinates (links to map & photo sources)	OS grid reference
Cock Alley	Derbyshire	53.22°N 01.38°W	SK4170
Cockayne	North Yorkshire	54.38°N 01.05°W	SE6298
Cockayne Hatley	Bedfordshire	52.12°N 00.16°W	TL2649
Cock Bank	Wrexham	52.99°N 02.97°W	SJ3545
Cock Bevington	Warwickshire	52.16°N 01.92°W	SP0552
Cockburnspath	Scottish Borders	55.92°N 02.36°W	NT7770
Cock Clarks	Essex	51.68°N 00.61°E	TL8102
Cockden	Lancashire	53.80°N 02.19°W	SD8734
Cock & End	Suffolk	52.14°N 00.51°E	TL7253
Cockenzie and Port Seton	East Lothian	55.96°N 02.96°W	NT4075
Cocker Bar	Lancashire	53.69°N 02.75°W	SD5022
Cockerham	Lancashire	53.96°N 02.82°W	SD4652
Cockermouth	Cumbria	54.65°N 03.36°W	NY1230
Cockernhoe	Hertfordshire	51.89°N 00.37°W	TL1223
Cockersdale	Leeds	53.75°N 01.65°W	SE2329
Cockerton	Darlington	54.53°N 01.58°W	NZ2715
Cockett	Swansea	51.62°N 03.99°W	SS6294
Cockfield	Suffolk	52.15°N 00.77°E	TL9054
Cockfield	Durham	54.61°N 01.81°W	NZ1224
Cockfosters	Barnet	51.64°N 00.16°W	TQ2796
Cock Gate	Herefordshire	52.28°N 02.79°W	SO4665
Cock Green	Essex	51.84°N 00.45°E	TL6919
Cockhill	Somerset	51.07°N 02.54°W	ST6231
Cock Hill	North Yorkshire	53.98°N 01.22°W	SE5155
Cocking	West Sussex	50.94°N 00.76°W	SU8717
Cocking Causeway	West Sussex	50.96°N 00.74°W	SU8819
Cockington	Devon	50.45°N 03.56°W	SX8963
Cocklake	Somerset	51.23°N 02.81°W	ST4349
Cockleford	Gloucestershire	51.82°N 02.05°W	SO9614
Cockley Beck	Cumbria	54.39°N 03.17°W	NY2401
Cockley Cley	Norfolk	52.60°N 00.64°E	TF7904
Cockley Hill	Kirklees	53.64°N 01.72°W	SE1817
Cockmannings	Bromley	51.380°N 00.128°E	TQ482667
Cock Marling	East Sussex	50.93°N 00.67°E	TQ8818
Cocknowle	Dorset	50.62°N 02.10°W	SY9381
Cock of Arran	North Ayrshire	55.71°N 05.26°W	NR949516
Cockpole Green	Berkshire	51.52°N 00.86°W	SU7981
Cocks	Cornwall	50.32°N 05.14°W	SW7652
Cocks Green	Suffolk	52.18°N 00.74°E	TL8858
Cockshead	Ceredigion	52.17°N 04.00°W	SN6355
Cockshoot	Herefordshire	52.03°N 02.61°W	SO5838
Cockshutford	Shropshire	52.46°N 02.61°W	SO5885
Cockshutt (Cockshutt-cum-Petton)	Shropshire	52.85°N 02.84°W	SJ4329
Cockshutt (Highley)	Shropshire	52.44°N 02.39°W	SO7383
Cock Street	Kent	51.22°N 00.53°E	TQ7750
Cock Street	Suffolk	51.98°N 00.85°E	TL9636
Cockthorpe	Norfolk	52.93°N 00.94°E	TF9842
Cockwells	Cornwall	50.15°N 05.47°W	SW5234
Cockwood	Devon	50.61°N 03.45°W	SX9780
Cockwood	Somerset	51.17°N 03.11°W	ST2242
Cockyard	Derbyshire	53.30°N 01.94°W	SK0479
Cockyard	Herefordshire	51.99°N 02.86°W	SO4133

=== Cod ===
Location	Locality	Coordinates (links to map & photo sources)	OS grid reference
Coddenham	Suffolk	52.14°N 01.11°E	TM1354
Coddenham Green	Suffolk	52.15°N 01.08°E	TM1155
Coddington	Herefordshire	52.07°N 02.42°W	SO7142
Coddington	Nottinghamshire	53.07°N 00.76°W	SK8354
Coddington	Cheshire	53.08°N 02.82°W	SJ4555
Codford St Mary	Wiltshire	51.15°N 02.04°W	ST9739
Codford St Peter	Wiltshire	51.15°N 02.05°W	ST9640
Codicote	Hertfordshire	51.84°N 00.24°W	TL2118
Codicote Bottom	Hertfordshire	51.83°N 00.25°W	TL2017
Codmore	Buckinghamshire	51.70°N 00.59°W	SP9702
Codmore Hill	West Sussex	50.97°N 00.50°W	TQ0520
Codnor	Derbyshire	53.03°N 01.38°W	SK4149
Codnor Breach	Derbyshire	53.01°N 01.40°W	SK4047
Codnor Gate	Derbyshire	53.04°N 01.38°W	SK4150
Codnor Park	Derbyshire	53.05°N 01.35°W	SK4351
Codrington	South Gloucestershire	51.50°N 02.40°W	ST7278
Codsall	Staffordshire	52.62°N 02.19°W	SJ8703
Codsall Wood	Staffordshire	52.64°N 02.23°W	SJ8405
Codsend	Somerset	51.13°N 03.60°W	SS8839

=== Coe ===
Location	Locality	Coordinates (links to map & photo sources)	OS grid reference
Coedcae	Blaenau Gwent	51.77°N 03.17°W	SO1909
Coedcae	Torfaen	51.76°N 03.07°W	SO2608
Coed-Cwnwr	Monmouthshire	51.68°N 02.85°W	ST4199
Coed Duon (Blackwood)	Caerphilly	51.66°N 03.20°W	ST1797
Coedely	Rhondda, Cynon, Taff	51.55°N 03.42°W	ST0185
Coed Eva	Torfaen	51.63°N 03.05°W	ST2793
Coedkernew	City of Newport	51.54°N 03.05°W	ST2783
Coed Llai (Leeswood)	Flintshire	53.12°N 03.09°W	SJ2759
Coed Mawr	Gwynedd	53.20°N 04.15°W	SH5670
Coed Morgan	Monmouthshire	51.79°N 02.94°W	SO3511
Coedpoeth	Wrexham	53.05°N 03.07°W	SJ2851
Coed-talon	Flintshire	53.11°N 03.10°W	SJ2658
Coedway	Shropshire	52.71°N 02.97°W	SJ3414
Coed-y-bryn	Ceredigion	52.07°N 04.40°W	SN3545
Coed-y-caerau	City of Newport	51.61°N 02.89°W	ST3891
Coed-y-fedw	Monmouthshire	51.76°N 02.81°W	SO4408
Coed y Garth	Ceredigion	52.52°N 03.94°W	SN6894
Coed y go	Shropshire	52.83°N 03.08°W	SJ2727
Coed-y-paen	Monmouthshire	51.67°N 02.97°W	ST3398
Coed-y-parc	Gwynedd	53.17°N 04.08°W	SH6166
Coed-yr-ynys	Powys	51.87°N 03.23°W	SO1520
Coed Ystumgwern	Gwynedd	52.78°N 04.10°W	SH5823
Coed-y-wlad	Powys	52.67°N 03.15°W	SJ2209
Coelbren	Powys	51.78°N 03.66°W	SN8511

=== Cof ===
Location	Locality	Coordinates (links to map & photo sources)	OS grid reference
Coffee Hall	Milton Keynes	52.01°N 00.74°W	SP8636
Coffinswell	Devon	50.50°N 03.56°W	SX8968
Cofton	Devon	50.61°N 03.47°W	SX9680
Cofton Common	Birmingham	52.39°N 01.98°W	SP0177
Cofton Hackett	Worcestershire	52.37°N 02.00°W	SP0075

=== Cog ===
Location	Locality	Coordinates (links to map & photo sources)	OS grid reference
Cog	The Vale of Glamorgan	51.40°N 03.20°W	ST1668
Cogan	The Vale of Glamorgan	51.44°N 03.19°W	ST1772
Cogenhoe	Northamptonshire	52.23°N 00.80°W	SP8260
Cogges	Oxfordshire	51.77°N 01.47°W	SP3609
Coggeshall	Essex	51.86°N 00.68°E	TL8522
Coggeshall Hamlet	Essex	51.85°N 00.68°E	TL8521
Coggins Mill	East Sussex	51.02°N 00.26°E	TQ5927

=== Coi ===
Location	Locality	Coordinates (links to map & photo sources)	OS grid reference
Coig Peighinnean	Western Isles	58.49°N 06.25°W	NB5264
Coig Peighinnean Bhuirgh	Western Isles	58.41°N 06.45°W	NB4056
Coilleag	Western Isles	57.06°N 07.31°W	NF7810
Coillore	Highland	57.34°N 06.40°W	NG3537
Coire an Fhuarain	Western Isles	58.19°N 06.71°W	NB2332
Coisley Hill	Sheffield	53.35°N 01.38°W	SK4184
Coity	Bridgend	51.51°N 03.55°W	SS9281

=== Cok ===
Location	Locality	Coordinates (links to map & photo sources)	OS grid reference
Cokenach	Hertfordshire	52.00°N 00.02°E	TL3936
Cokhay Green	Derbyshire	52.83°N 01.57°W	SK2926

=== Col ===
Location	Locality	Coordinates (links to map & photo sources)	OS grid reference
Colan	Cornwall	50.40°N 05.01°W	SW8661
Colaton Raleigh	Devon	50.67°N 03.31°W	SY0787
Colbost	Highland	57.44°N 06.65°W	NG2149
Colburn	North Yorkshire	54.37°N 01.69°W	SE2098
Colby	Cumbria	54.57°N 02.52°W	NY6620
Colby	Isle of Man	54.09°N 04.70°W	SC2370
Colby	Norfolk	52.83°N 01.29°E	TG2231
Colchester	Essex	51.88°N 00.89°E	TL9925
Colchester Green	Suffolk	52.16°N 00.80°E	TL9255
Colcot	The Vale Of Glamorgan	51.41°N 03.28°W	ST1169
Cold Ash	Berkshire	51.41°N 01.26°W	SU5169
Cold Ashby	Northamptonshire	52.37°N 01.04°W	SP6576
Cold Ash Hill	Hampshire	51.08°N 00.80°W	SU8432
Cold Ashton	South Gloucestershire	51.44°N 02.37°W	ST7472
Cold Aston	Gloucestershire	51.86°N 01.82°W	SP1219
Coldbackie	Highland	58.49°N 04.38°W	NC6159
Cold Blow	Pembrokeshire	51.77°N 04.72°W	SN1212
Coldblow	Bexley	51.43°N 00.15°E	TQ5073
Cold Brayfield	Milton Keynes	52.15°N 00.65°W	SP9252
Coldbrook	Powys	52.01°N 03.24°W	SO1536
Cold Christmas	Hertfordshire	51.82°N -00.00°E	TL3816
Cold Cotes	North Yorkshire	54.13°N 02.44°W	SD7171
Coldean	Brighton and Hove	50.85°N 00.11°W	TQ3308
Coldeast	Devon	50.56°N 03.68°W	SX8175
Coldeaton	Staffordshire	53.10°N 01.79°W	SK1456
Cold Elm	Gloucestershire	51.98°N 02.23°W	SO8432
Colden	Calderdale	53.74°N 02.06°W	SD9628
Colden Common	Hampshire	50.99°N 01.33°W	SU4722
Coldfair Green	Suffolk	52.19°N 01.55°E	TM4361
Coldham	Staffordshire	52.66°N 02.22°W	SJ8508
Coldham	Cambridgeshire	52.59°N 00.11°E	TF4302
Coldham's Common	Cambridgeshire	52.20°N 00.14°E	TL4758
Cold Hanworth	Lincolnshire	53.33°N 00.45°W	TF0383
Cold Harbour	Berkshire	51.49°N 00.80°W	SU8378
Coldharbour	Havering	51.48°N 00.18°E	TQ5278
Coldharbour	Cornwall	50.28°N 05.16°W	SW7548
Coldharbour	Devon	50.89°N 03.33°W	ST0612
Coldharbour	Dorset	50.62°N 02.49°W	SY6581
Cold Harbour	Dorset	50.70°N 02.14°W	SY9089
Coldharbour	Gloucestershire	51.72°N 02.65°W	SO5503
Coldharbour	Greenwich	51.431°N 00.052°W	TQ427722
Cold Harbour	Hertfordshire	51.83°N 00.34°W	TL1416
Cold Harbour	Kent	51.34°N 00.68°E	TQ8764
Coldharbour	Kent	51.22°N 00.24°E	TQ5750
Cold Harbour	Lincolnshire	52.89°N 00.58°W	SK9534
Cold Harbour	Oxfordshire	51.50°N 01.09°W	SU6379
Coldharbour	Surrey	51.17°N 00.37°W	TQ1443
Cold Harbour (Great Hinton)	Wiltshire	51.32°N 02.15°W	ST8958
Cold Harbour (Warminster)	Wiltshire	51.20°N 02.20°W	ST8645
Cold Hatton	Shropshire	52.78°N 02.56°W	SJ6221
Cold Hatton Heath	Shropshire	52.78°N 02.55°W	SJ6321
Cold Hesledon	Durham	54.81°N 01.37°W	NZ4047
Cold Hiendley	Wakefield	53.62°N 01.44°W	SE3714
Cold Higham	Northamptonshire	52.17°N 01.03°W	SP6653
Coldingham	Scottish Borders	55.88°N 02.16°W	NT9066
Cold Inn	Pembrokeshire	51.71°N 04.75°W	SN1005
Cold Kirby	North Yorkshire	54.24°N 01.18°W	SE5384
Coldmeece	Staffordshire	52.88°N 02.22°W	SJ8532
Cold Moss Heath	Cheshire	53.13°N 02.36°W	SJ7660
Cold Newton	Leicestershire	52.64°N 00.95°W	SK7106
Cold Northcott	Cornwall	50.64°N 04.54°W	SX2086
Cold Norton	Essex	51.66°N 00.65°E	TL8400
Coldoch	Stirling	56.15°N 04.11°W	NS6998
Cold Overton	Leicestershire	52.68°N 00.80°W	SK8110
Coldra	City of Newport	51.59°N 02.93°W	ST3589
Coldred	Kent	51.16°N 01.24°E	TR2746
Coldridge	Devon	50.84°N 03.86°W	SS6907
Cold Row	Lancashire	53.88°N 02.96°W	SD3744
Coldstream	Scottish Borders	55.64°N 02.25°W	NT8439
Coldvreath	Cornwall	50.38°N 04.84°W	SW9858
Coldwaltham	West Sussex	50.93°N 00.54°W	TQ0216
Cold Well	Staffordshire	52.69°N 01.92°W	SK0511
Cole	Somerset	51.09°N 02.48°W	ST6633
Colebatch	Shropshire	52.47°N 03.01°W	SO3187
Colebrooke	Devon	50.78°N 03.74°W 50.84°N 03.42°W	SS7700 ST0006
Coleby	Lincolnshire	53.12°N 00.55°W	SK9760
Coleby	North Lincolnshire	53.66°N 00.65°W	SE8919
Cole End	Essex	52.00°N 00.27°E	TL5636
Cole End	Warwickshire	52.49°N 01.72°W	SP1989
Coleford	Devon	50.79°N 03.74°W	SS7701
Coleford	Gloucestershire	51.78°N 02.62°W	SO5710
Coleford	Somerset	51.23°N 02.45°W	ST6849
Coleford Water	Somerset	51.08°N 03.27°W	ST1133
Colegate End	Norfolk	52.44°N 01.22°E	TM1988
Cole Green (Brent Pelham)	Hertfordshire	51.95°N 00.07°E	TL4331
Cole Green (Hertingfordbury)	Hertfordshire	51.78°N 00.14°W	TL2811
Colehall	Birmingham	52.49°N 01.79°W	SP1488
Cole Henley	Hampshire	51.24°N 01.34°W	SU4650
Colehill	Dorset	50.79°N 01.97°W	SU0200
Coleman Green	Hertfordshire	51.79°N 00.27°W	TL1912
Coleman's Hatch	East Sussex	51.07°N 00.06°E	TQ4533
Colemere	Shropshire	52.88°N 02.84°W	SJ4332
Colemore	Hampshire	51.06°N 01.00°W	SU7030
Colemore Green	Shropshire	52.57°N 02.44°W	SO7097
Coleorton	Leicestershire	52.74°N 01.40°W	SK4017
Coleorton Moor	Leicestershire	52.74°N 01.40°W	SK4016
Cole Park	Richmond Upon Thames	51.44°N 00.33°W	TQ1673
Colerne	Wiltshire	51.43°N 02.27°W	ST8171
Colesbourne	Gloucestershire	51.81°N 02.01°W	SO9913
Colesbrook	Dorset	51.04°N 02.28°W	ST8027
Cole's Cross	Dorset	50.81°N 02.86°W	ST3902
Colesden	Bedfordshire	52.18°N 00.36°W	TL1255
Coles Green	Worcestershire	52.15°N 02.35°W	SO7651
Coles Green	Suffolk	52.02°N 01.04°E	TM0941
Cole's Green	Suffolk	52.20°N 01.33°E	TM2862
Coleshill	Buckinghamshire	51.64°N 00.64°W	SU9495
Coleshill	Oxfordshire	51.63°N 01.66°W	SU2393
Coleshill	Warwickshire	52.49°N 01.72°W	SP1989
Coles Meads	Surrey	51.24°N 00.18°W	TQ2751
Colestocks	Devon	50.79°N 03.29°W	ST0900
Colethrop	Gloucestershire	51.78°N 02.26°W	SO8210
Coley	Bath and North East Somerset	51.29°N 02.60°W	ST5855
Coley	Berkshire	51.44°N 00.97°W	SU7172
Coley	Calderdale	53.73°N 01.81°W	SE1227
Coley Park	Berkshire	51.44°N 00.99°W	SU7072
Colgate	West Sussex	51.07°N 00.24°W	TQ2332
Colham Green	Hillingdon	51.51°N 00.45°W	TQ0781
Colindale	Barnet	51.58°N 00.25°W	TQ2189
Colinsburgh	Fife	56.21°N 02.85°W	NO4703
Colinton	City of Edinburgh	55.89°N 03.26°W	NT2168
Colintraive	Argyll and Bute	55.91°N 05.15°W	NS0374
Colkirk	Norfolk	52.79°N 00.83°E	TF9126
Coll	Argyll and Bute	56.63°N 06.58°W	NM190588
Coll	Western Isles	58.27°N 06.33°W	NB460397
Collafield	Gloucestershire	51.82°N 02.49°W	SO6614
Collafirth	Shetland Islands	60.39°N 01.23°W	HU4268
Collam	Western Isles	57.81°N 06.80°W	NG1591
Collamoor Head	Cornwall	50.70°N 04.59°W	SX1793
Collaton	Devon	50.23°N 03.81°W	SX7139
Collaton St Mary	Devon	50.42°N 03.60°W	SX8660
College Milton	South Lanarkshire	55.76°N 04.21°W	NS6155
College of Roseisle	Moray	57.67°N 03.46°W	NJ1366
College Park	Hammersmith and Fulham	51.52°N 00.24°W	TQ2282
College Town	Berkshire	51.34°N 00.78°W	SU8561
Collennan	South Ayrshire	55.55°N 04.63°W	NS3432
Collessie	Fife	56.30°N 03.16°W	NO2813
Colleton Mills	Devon	50.91°N 03.90°W	SS6615
Collett's Bridge	Cambridgeshire	52.63°N 00.18°E	TF4806
Collett's Green	Worcestershire	52.15°N 02.26°W	SO8251
Collier Row	Havering	51.58°N 00.16°E	TQ5090
Colliers End	Hertfordshire	51.86°N 00.01°W	TL3720
Collier's Green	East Sussex	50.97°N 00.53°E	TQ7822
Colliers Hatch	Essex	51.69°N 00.16°E	TL5002
Collier Street	Kent	51.17°N 00.44°E	TQ7145
Collier's Wood	Merton	51.41°N 00.17°W	TQ2770
Colliery Row	Durham	54.83°N 01.50°W	NZ3249
Collieston	Aberdeenshire	57.34°N 01.95°W	NK0328
Collin	Dumfries and Galloway	55.06°N 03.53°W	NY0276
Collingbourne Ducis	Wiltshire	51.27°N 01.65°W	SU2453
Collingbourne Kingston	Wiltshire	51.29°N 01.65°W	SU2455
Collingham	Leeds	53.90°N 01.42°W	SE3845
Collingham	Nottinghamshire	53.14°N 00.76°W	SK8361
Collington	Herefordshire	52.23°N 02.52°W	SO6460
Collingtree	Northamptonshire	52.18°N 00.90°W	SP7555
Collingwood	Northumberland	55.06°N 01.57°W	NZ2775
Collins End	Oxfordshire	51.49°N 01.06°W	SU6578
Collins Green	Cheshire	53.44°N 02.67°W	SJ5594
Collins Green	Worcestershire	52.21°N 02.39°W	SO7357
Collipriest	Devon	50.88°N 03.49°W	SS9511
Colliston	Angus	56.59°N 02.65°W	NO6045
Colliton	Devon	50.82°N 03.30°W	ST0804
Collycroft	Warwickshire	52.48°N 01.48°W	SP3588
Collyhurst	Manchester	53.49°N 02.22°W	SD8500
Collyweston	Northamptonshire	52.60°N 00.53°W	SK9902
Colmonell	South Ayrshire	55.12°N 04.91°W	NX1485
Colmslie	Scottish Borders	55.64°N 02.78°W	NT5139
Colmsliehill	Scottish Borders	55.66°N 02.78°W	NT5141
Colmworth	Bedfordshire	52.20°N 00.39°W	TL1058
Colnbrook	Berkshire	51.48°N 00.53°W	TQ0277
Colne	Cambridgeshire	52.35°N 00.01°E	TL3775
Colne	Lancashire	53.85°N 02.16°W	SD8940
Colne Bridge	Kirklees	53.67°N 01.74°W	SE1720
Colne Edge	Lancashire	53.86°N 02.18°W	SD8841
Colne Engaine	Essex	51.93°N 00.69°E	TL8530
Colnefields	Cambridgeshire	52.37°N 00.01°E	TL3777
Colne Point	Essex	51.77°N 01.04°E	TM102127
Colney	Norfolk	52.61°N 01.21°E	TG1807
Colney Hatch	Barnet	51.60°N 00.16°W	TQ2791
Colney Heath	Hertfordshire	51.73°N 00.26°W	TL2005
Colney Street	Hertfordshire	51.70°N 00.33°W	TL1502
Coln Rogers	Gloucestershire	51.77°N 01.88°W	SP0809
Coln St Aldwyns	Gloucestershire	51.74°N 01.79°W	SP1405
Coln St Dennis	Gloucestershire	51.78°N 01.88°W	SP0810
Colonsay	Argyll and Bute	56.07°N 06.21°W	NR381952
Colpitts Grange	Northumberland	54.89°N 02.03°W	NY9855
Colpy	Aberdeenshire	57.37°N 02.60°W	NJ6432
Colsay	Shetland Islands	59.95°N 01.36°W	HU358186
Colscott	Devon	50.90°N 04.33°W	SS3614
Colshaw	Staffordshire	53.20°N 01.94°W	SK0467
Colsterdale	North Yorkshire	54.22°N 01.80°W	SE1381
Colsterworth	Lincolnshire	52.80°N 00.63°W	SK9224
Colston	Pembrokeshire	51.91°N 04.93°W	SM9828
Colston	City of Glasgow	55.89°N 04.24°W	NS6069
Colston Bassett	Nottinghamshire	52.89°N 00.96°W	SK7033
Colstrope	Buckinghamshire	51.58°N 00.87°W	SU7888
Coltfield	Moray	57.64°N 03.49°W	NJ1163
Colt Hill	Hampshire	51.25°N 00.94°W	SU7451
Colthouse	Cumbria	54.37°N 03.00°W	SD3598
Colthrop	Berkshire	51.39°N 01.23°W	SU5366
Coltishall	Norfolk	52.73°N 01.36°E	TG2720
Coltness	North Lanarkshire	55.78°N 03.91°W	NS8056
Colton	Cumbria	54.26°N 03.06°W	SD3186
Colton	Leeds	53.78°N 01.45°W	SE3632
Colton	Norfolk	52.63°N 01.10°E	TG1009
Colton	North Yorkshire	53.88°N 01.17°W	SE5444
Colton	Staffordshire	52.77°N 01.92°W	SK0520
Colton	Suffolk	52.26°N 00.73°E	TL8766
Colton Hills	Staffordshire	52.55°N 02.14°W	SO9095
Colt Park	Cumbria	54.12°N 03.11°W	SD2770
Colt's Green	South Gloucestershire	51.52°N 02.37°W	ST7481
Colt's Hill	Kent	51.16°N 00.34°E	TQ6443
Col Uarach	Western Isles	58.26°N 06.35°W	NB4539
Columbia	Sunderland	54.88°N 01.51°W	NZ3155
Columbjohn	Devon	50.78°N 03.49°W	SX9599
Colva	Powys	52.16°N 03.17°W	SO2053
Colvister	Shetland Islands	60.65°N 01.06°W	HU5197
Colwall	Herefordshire	52.07°N 02.39°W	SO7342
Colwall Green	Herefordshire	52.06°N 02.36°W	SO7541
Colwall Stone	Herefordshire	52.07°N 02.36°W	SO7542
Colwell	Northumberland	55.06°N 02.07°W	NY9575
Colwich	Staffordshire	52.78°N 01.98°W	SK0121
Colwick	Nottinghamshire	52.95°N 01.09°W	SK6140
Colwinston	The Vale Of Glamorgan	51.46°N 03.52°W	SS9475
Colworth	West Sussex	50.81°N 00.70°W	SU9102
Colworth Ho	Bedfordshire	52.22°N 00.56°W	SP9860
Colwyn Bay	Conwy	53.28°N 03.71°W	SH8678
Colyford	Devon	50.72°N 03.07°W	SY2492
Colyton	Devon	50.73°N 03.07°W	SY2493
