= Tong, Lewis =

Coordinates: 58.244°N 6.349°W

Tong: Scottish Gaelic: Tunga
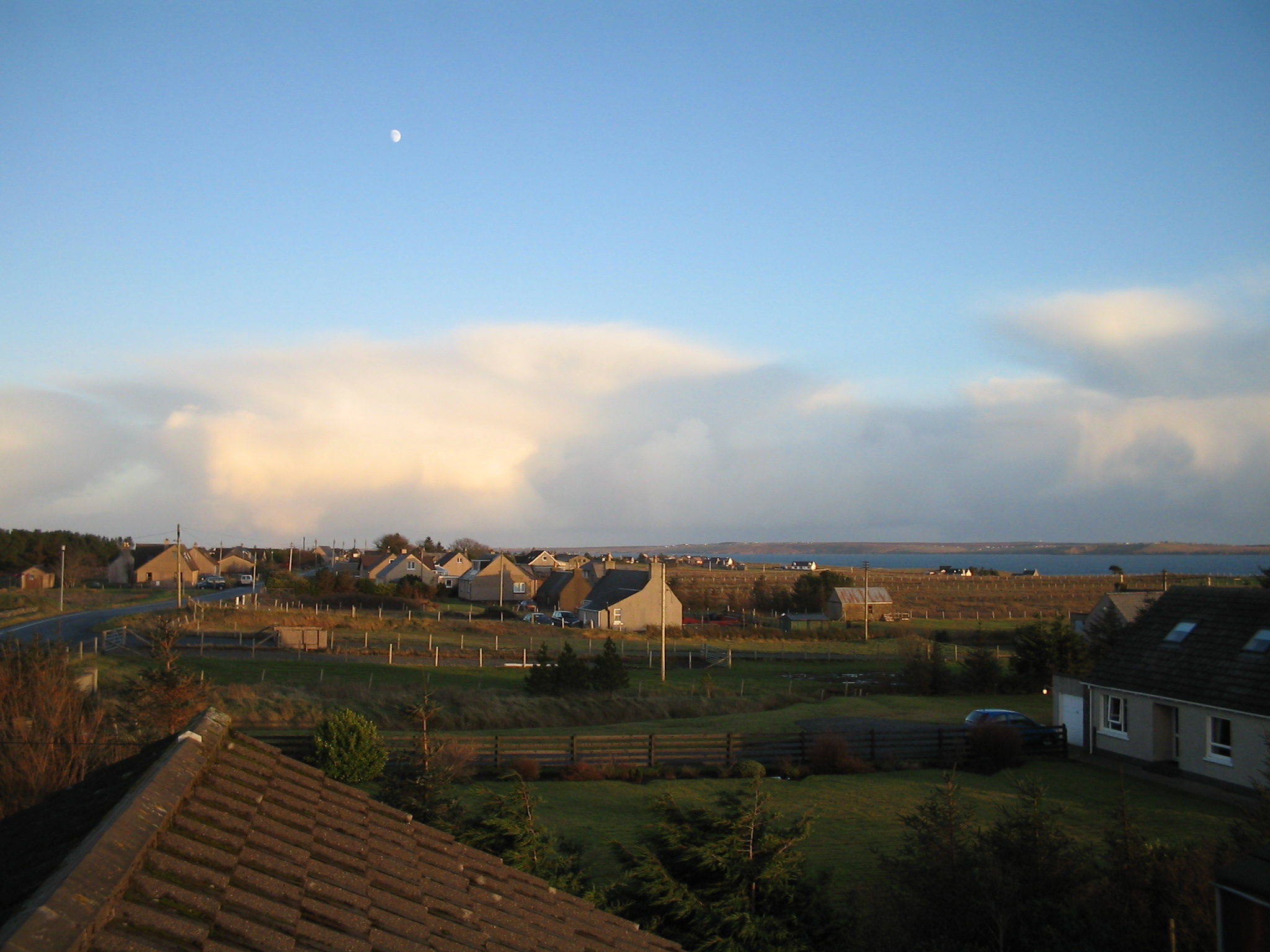

- Location within the Outer Hebrides
- Population: 527 (2001)
- Language: Scottish Gaelic; English
- OS grid reference: NB448365
- Civil parish: Stornoway
- Council area: Na h-Eileanan Siar
- Lieutenancy area: Western Isles
- Country: Scotland
- Sovereign state: United Kingdom
- Post town: ISLE OF LEWIS
- Postcode district: HS2
- Dialling code: 01851
- Police: Scotland
- Fire: Scottish
- Ambulance: Scottish
- UK Parliament: Na h-Eileanan an Iar
- Scottish Parliament: Na h-Eileanan an Iar

Tong (Scottish Gaelic: Tunga from Old Norse: Tunga) is a village on the Isle of Lewis, Scotland, 4 miles (6 kilometres) northeast of the main town of Stornoway on the B895 road to Back and Tolsta. The population of the village is 527 (2001 census). Fishing forms part of the local economy.

The mainland of Scotland is 40 nautical miles (75 kilometres) away via a two-hour ferry ride.

== History ==
Until the 13th century, Lewis – and Tong with it – was part of Norway. Fishing, farming and weaving made up Tong's economy by the 1800s. Later in the century, landlords throughout much of Lewis ousted their tenants to install sheep farms and deer forests, industries which used huge swathes of land with few farmers. Many families moved to Tong, causing "horrific overcrowding." Scottish historian James Hunter quotes a mainland land manager's 1828 description: “It is worse than anything I ever saw in Donegal [in Ireland] where I always considered human wretchedness to have reached its very acme.”

Between 1919 and 1921, Tong, along with nearby Coll and Gress, was the scene of several land raids. (See the Coll, Lewis article for more).

During the land raids, men raided estates with absentee landlords by planting crops and marking out farms on land used for sheep herding. Tong in particular was considered particularly radical; John Maclean, a Scottish socialist, who visited the area after World War I, "saw it as a "hotbed of insurrection" during a visit after World War I, and even through the 1990s, Tong’s residents were called "Bolshiveeks" by a Stornoway slang dictionary.

Tong's economy struggled in the early 1900s – crops were failing, the herring industry lost its main clients due to American Prohibition and the Russian Revolution, the 1918 flu epidemic killed many, and World War I killed thousands more of Hebridean men and the government failed to keep its promises of land for the survivors, pulverizing the summer social seasons where young people found their future spouses over putting the sheep out to graze. Though emigration was long a trend on Lewis, all these factors increased the rate significantly.

Circa 2016, Tong received much attention due to the candidacy of U.S. President Donald Trump, whose mother was born in Tong. The land nearby is described as flat and marshy with fields of peat, with fishing and sheep farming still parts of the local economy.

== Facilities ==
The village has a community centre with a football pitch and a primary school. Its religious establishments include a Free Church of Scotland mission house and a Scottish Episcopal Church meeting house.

== Culture and sport ==
Every July the Lewis Highland Games and "Western Isles Strongest man" competition are held at the community centre with heavy events such as tossing the caber, Highland dancing, bagpipe competitions and other attractions taking place on the football pitch. The Lewis Highland Games have been held at Tong since 1977 and is the second oldest Games on the isle of Lewis. "Western Isles Strongest man" competition was held for 10 consecutive years from 2002 to 2011, but due to financial difficulties and lack of interest, both Lewis Highland Games and Western Isles Strongest Man competition ended defunct by 2012.

The local football club is Tong FC.

== Notable people ==
- Sìne NicFhionnlaigh, who potentially composed the song "Fear a' bhàta", lived in Tong in the 1800s
- Mary Anne MacLeod, mother of U.S. president Donald Trump, was born and raised in Tong
- Alasdair White, fiddler with the Battlefield Band, was born in Tong

== Gallery ==
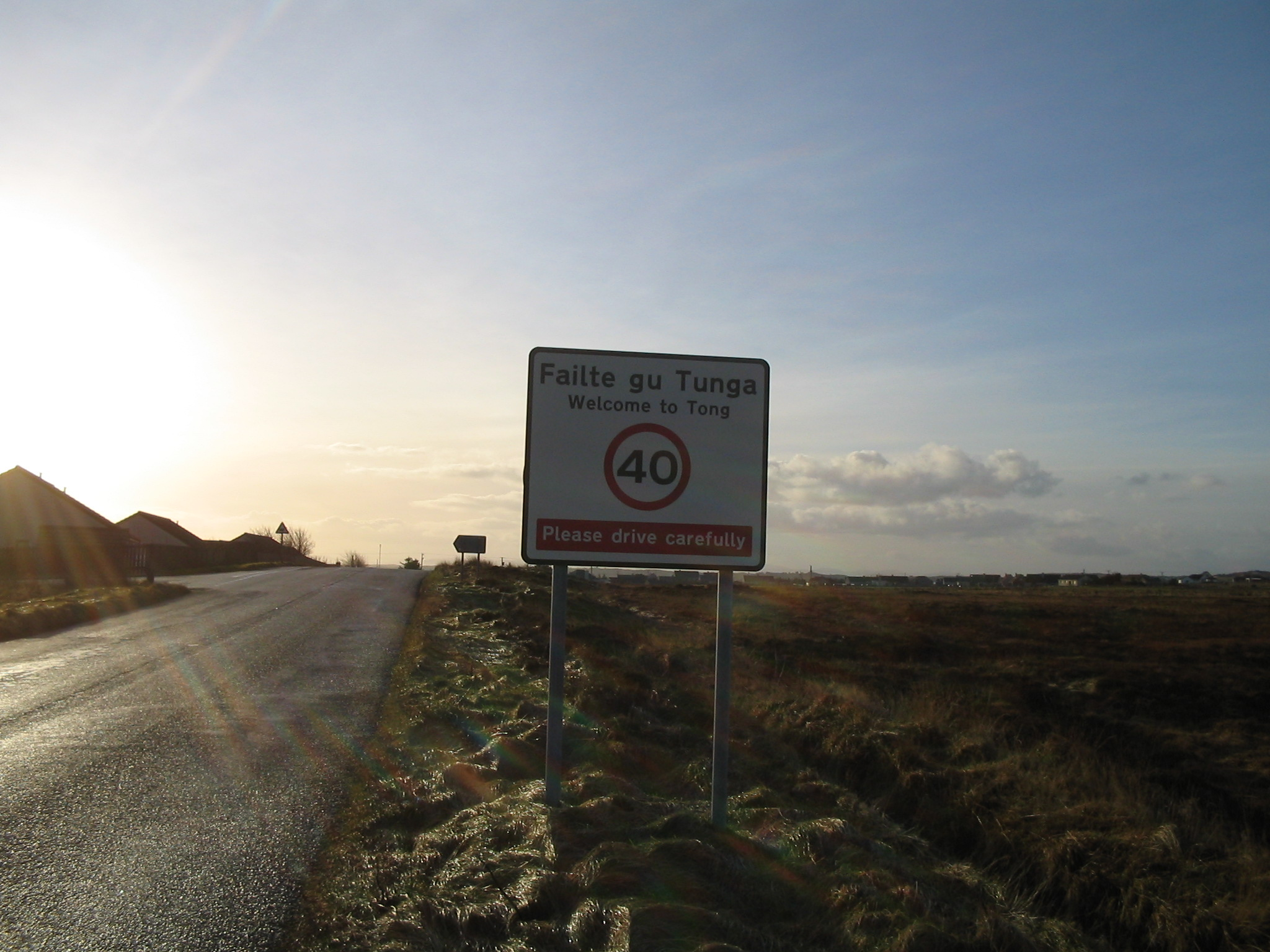
Fàilte gu Tunga (entering Tong from direction of Coll)

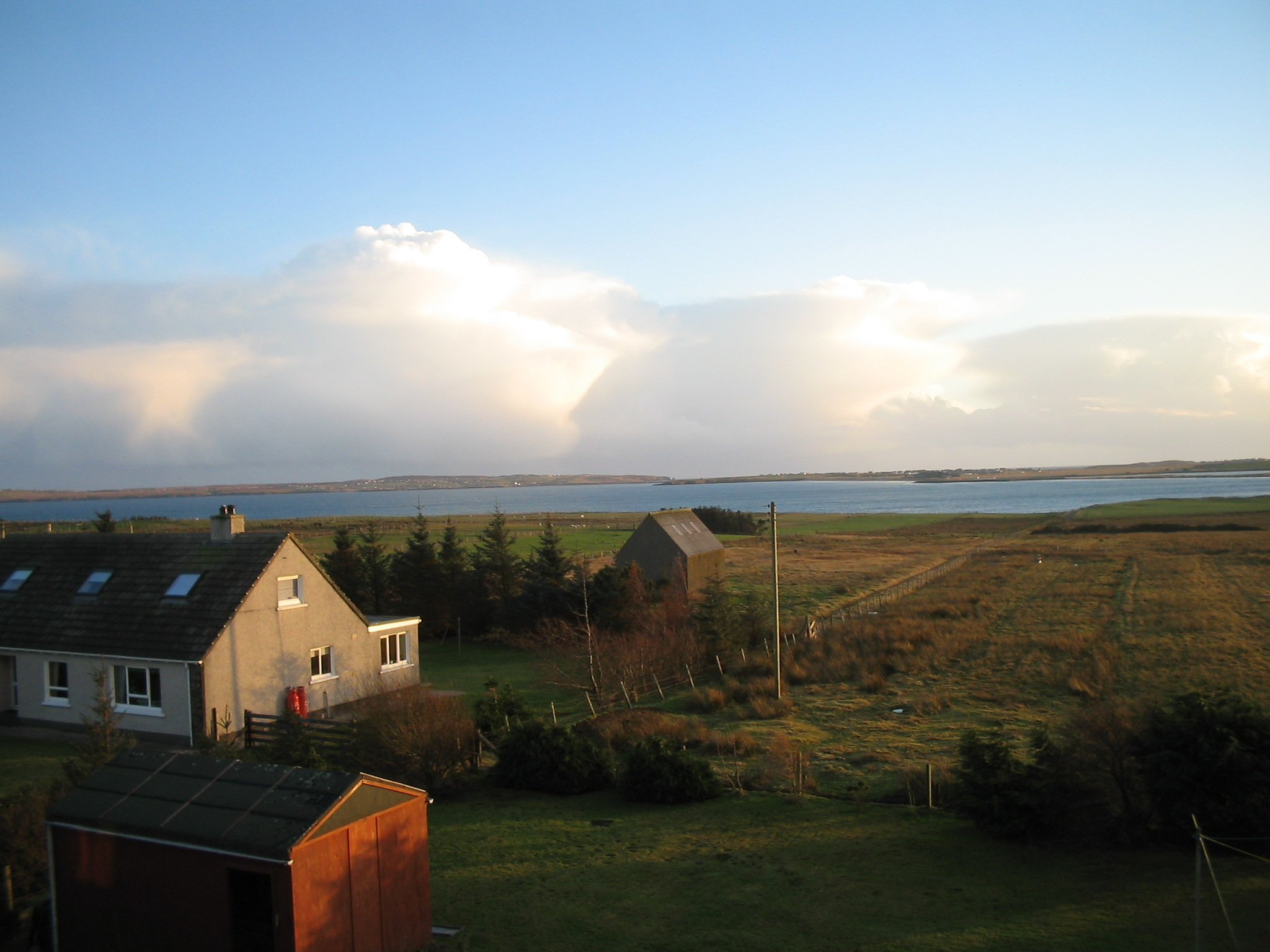
View towards Point (An Rubha), Broadbay (Loch a Tuath) and Stornoway Airport (Port-adhair Steòrnabhagh)

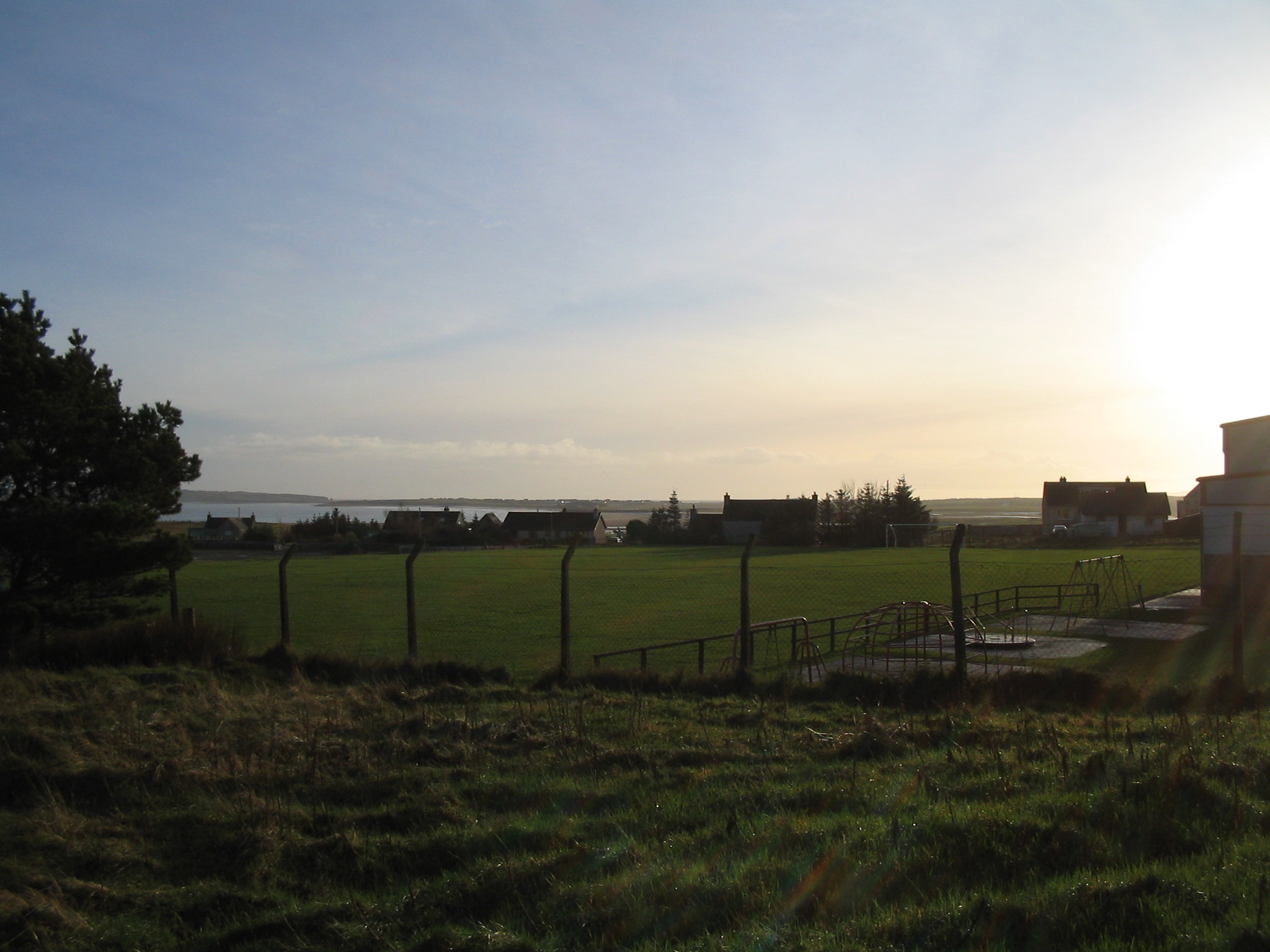
Tong football pitch and community centre

Tong Community Centre

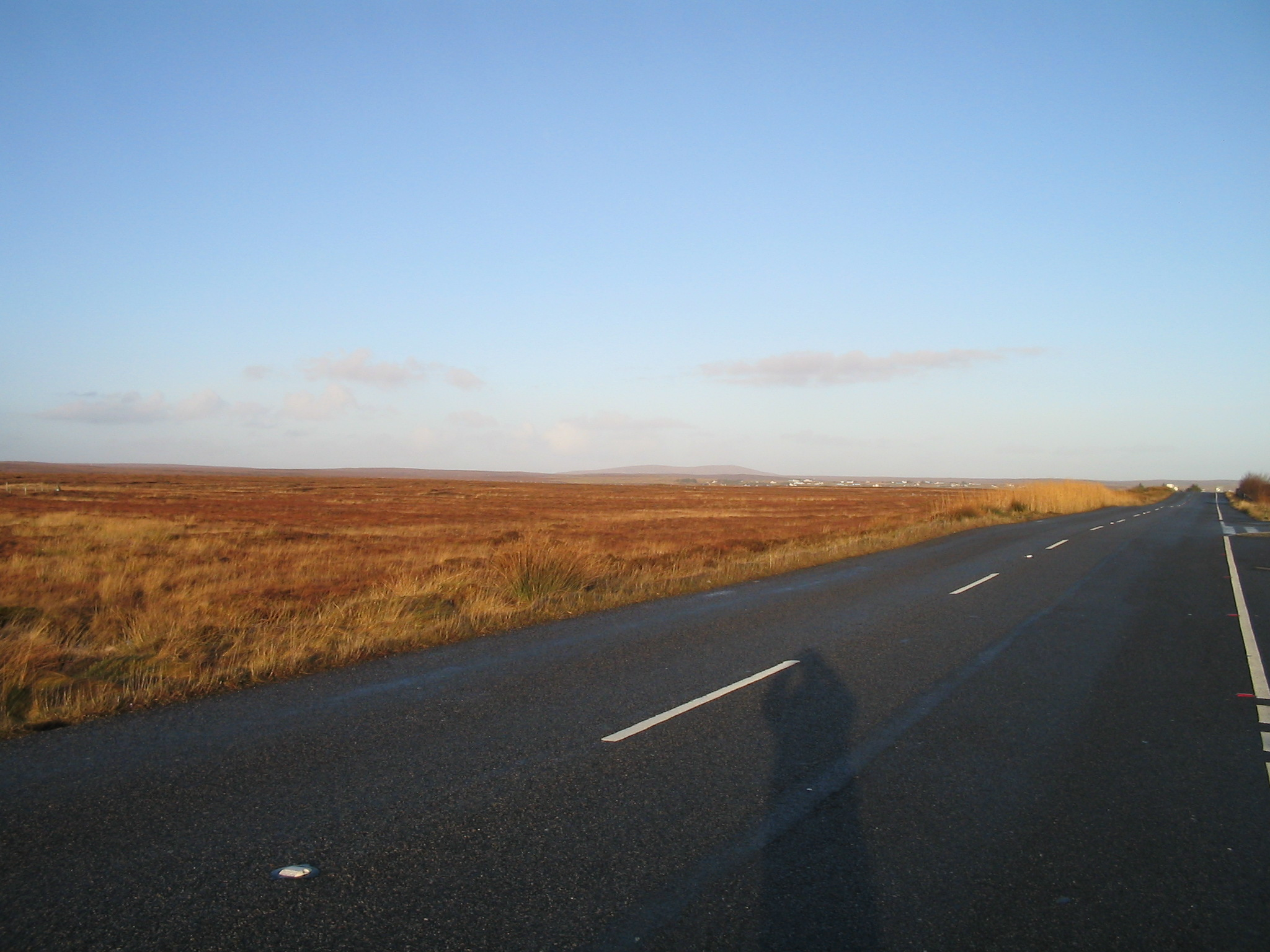
Main Road looking towards Coll

Towards Coll

Towards the crossroads

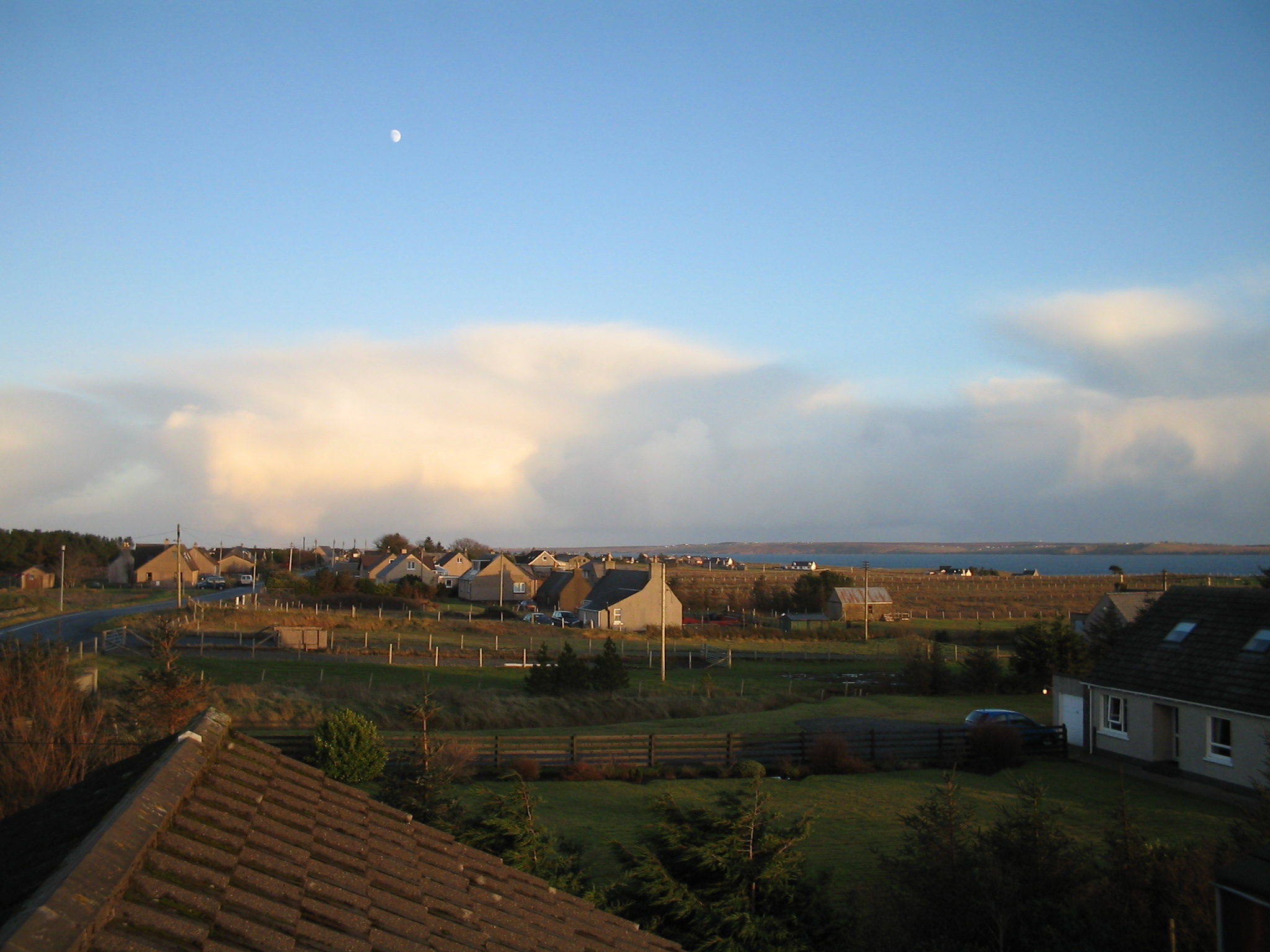
Into the village (Point across the bay in the background)
