= Cole Green =

Cole Green may refer to:

- Cole Green (baseball) (born 1989), American baseball player
- Cole Green, Brent Pelham, a location in Hertfordshire, England
- Cole Green, Hertfordshire, a hamlet in Hertingfordbury, Hertfordshire, England
  - Cole Green railway station, a closed station
