= Colpitts =

Colpitts is a surname. The ancestors of the Colpitts surname lived among the ancient Anglo-Saxon culture. The name comes from when they lived in Newcastle. The name means "at the coal pits," and is found in the area around the great coal mines in Newcastle and the surrounding area in Shropshire.

Notable people with the surname include:

- A. Russell Colpitts (born 1906), farmer and political figure in New Brunswick, Canada
- Edwin H. Colpitts (1872–1949), communications pioneer best known for his invention of the Colpitts oscillator
  - Colpitts oscillator, design for an LC electronic oscillator circuit

== See also ==
- Colpitts Grange, village in Northumberland, England
