= Whitecairns =

Coordinates: 57.255°N 2.130°W

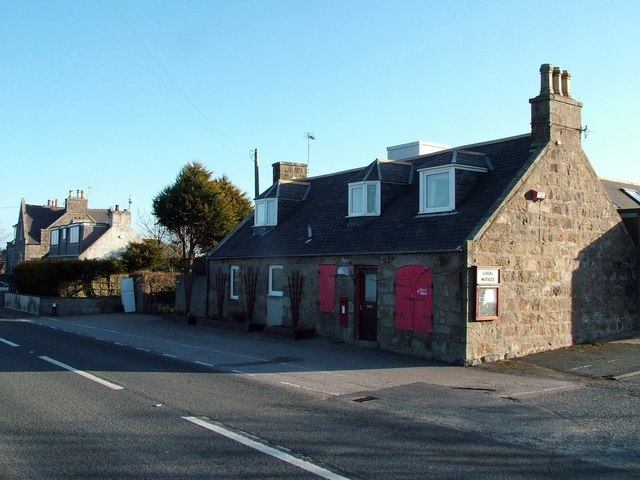
- The Old Shop, Whitecairns

- Location within Aberdeenshire
- OS grid reference: NJ922182
- Council area: Aberdeenshire
- Lieutenancy area: Aberdeenshire
- Country: Scotland
- Sovereign state: United Kingdom
- Post town: ABERDEEN
- Postcode district: AB23
- Dialling code: 01358 01651
- Police: Scotland
- Fire: Scottish
- Ambulance: Scottish
- UK Parliament: Gordon and Buchan
- Scottish Parliament: Aberdeenshire East

Whitecairns is a village in the Formartine area of Aberdeenshire, Scotland, lying 3.6 kilometres (2.2 mi) north of Potterton and 9.7 kilometres (6.0 mi) south of Pitmedden on the B999 road.

== Transport ==
Whitecairns is no longer served by local bus services operating within Aberdeenshire. The nearest bus stop is Potterton or Belhelvie.

== Decoy airfield ==
During the Second World War, Harestone Moss, close to Whitecairns, was used as a decoy airfield for RAF Dyce aerodrome.

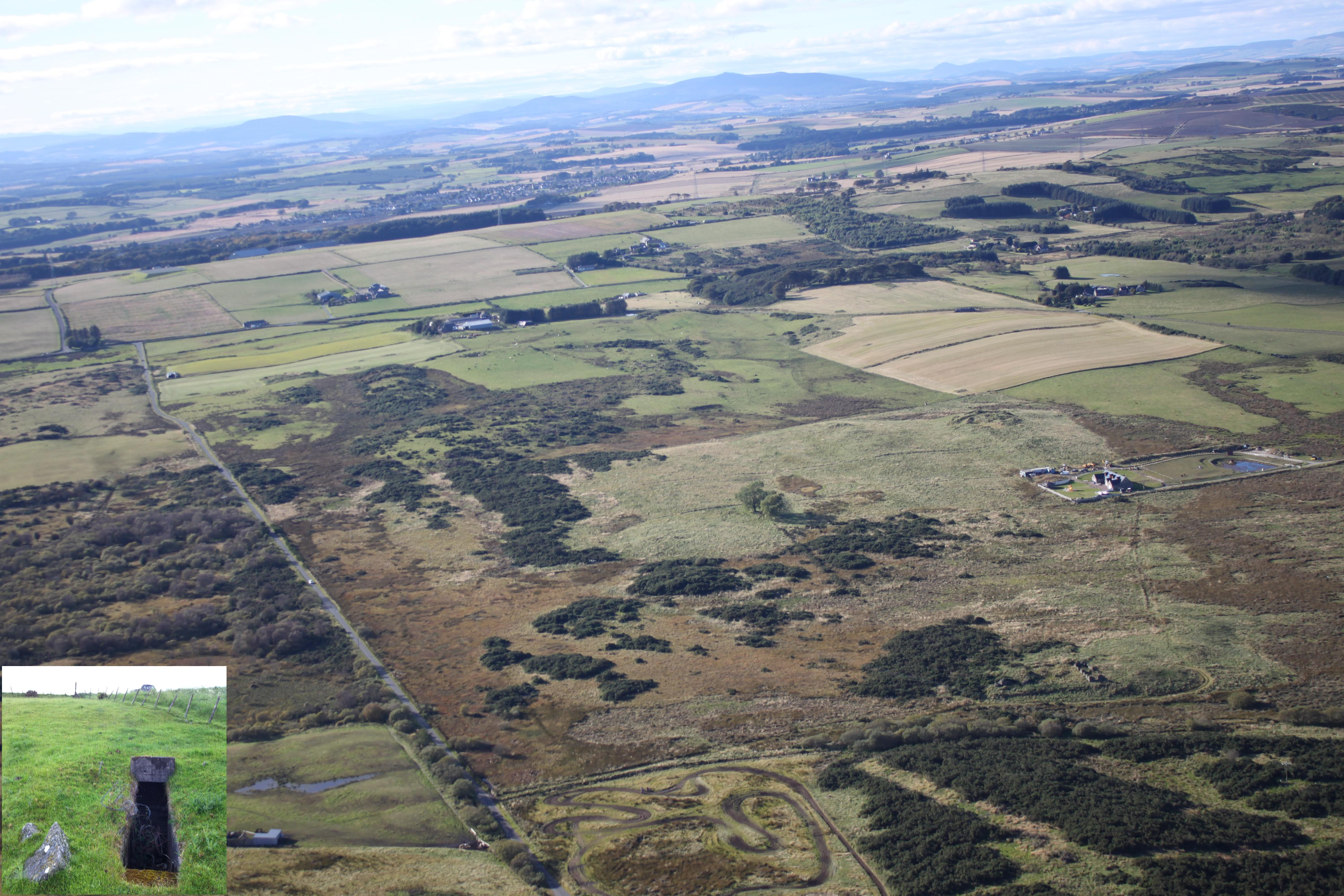
Decoy control bunker at Easter Craigie

The site included a decoy control bunker and generating plant used to power dummy airfield lighting.
