= Ashgrove =

Ashgrove can refer to:

- Ashgrove, Queensland, Australia
- Electoral district of Ashgrove - a former electoral district of the Legislative Assembly of Queensland, Australia
- Ashgrove, Bath and North East Somerset, England
- Ashgrove, Aberdeen, one of the Areas of Aberdeen, Scotland
- Ashgrove, Moray, Scotland
- "The Ash Grove", a Welsh folk song
- Ashgrove (album), an album by Dave Alvin
- Ashgrove (film), a 2022 Canadian drama
