= Gress =

Coordinates: 58.300°N 6.283°W

Gress: Scottish Gaelic: Griais
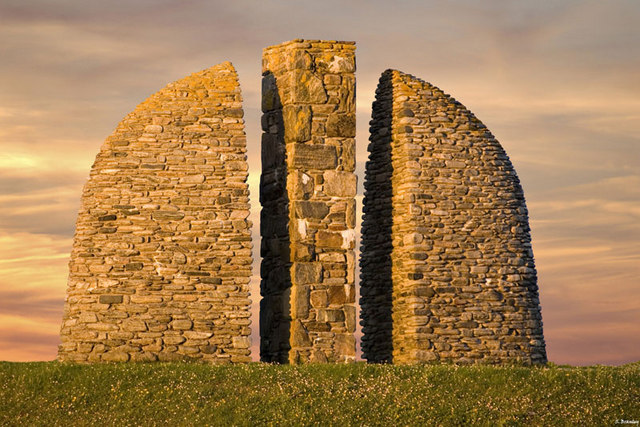
- The Gress Raiders Memorial, Gress

- Location within the Outer Hebrides
- Language: Scottish Gaelic; English
- OS grid reference: NB490425
- Civil parish: Stornoway
- Council area: Na h-Eileanan Siar
- Lieutenancy area: Western Isles
- Country: Scotland
- Sovereign state: United Kingdom
- Post town: ISLE OF LEWIS
- Postcode district: HS2
- Dialling code: 01851
- Police: Scotland
- Fire: Scottish
- Ambulance: Scottish
- UK Parliament: Na h-Eileanan an Iar
- Scottish Parliament: Na h-Eileanan an Iar

Gress (Scottish Gaelic: Griais), a hamlet on the Isle of Lewis in Scotland, is adjacent to the larger village of Back. Gress is within the parish of Stornoway. Between 1919 and 1921, Gress – along with nearby Coll and Tong – was the scene of several land raids.

== Historical sites ==
The corn mill at Gress was built in the 19th century and used until the early 20th century. The two-storey building is in a state of ruin. There is a millstone still present. Other sites include the Star Inn, considered one of the oldest buildings in Stornoway (dating back to 1756) and the Lews Castle.

== Geography and geology ==
Gress is situated on the B895, between Stornoway and North Tolsta.

== Nature ==
The moorland to the north of Gress is a breeding site for Arctic and great skua in the summer. The Iceland gull and the brent goose can be seen at Gress. The garden tiger moth has also been seen at Gress.

== See also ==
- Lewis and Harris
- History of the Outer Hebrides
