= Lewis & Harris Football Association =

Lewis & Harris League
- Country: Scotland
- Confederation: UEFA
- Divisions: 1
- Number of clubs: 9
- Level on pyramid: N/A
- Promotion to: None
- Relegation to: None
- Domestic cups: Moldova Lewis Cup; Jock Stein Cup; Western Isles Cup; Acres Boys Club Cup; Eilean an Fhraoich Cup; Highland Amateur Cup
- Current champions: Point (11th title) (2026)
- Website: Official website

The Lewis & Harris Football Association oversees the Lewis & Harris League, an annual football competition featuring clubs from the Lewis and Harris islands, situated off the coast of Scotland. Differing from traditional winter schedules, this league, like many other northern amateur leagues, operates during the summer months.

Comprising eight clubs from Lewis and one from Harris, the league holds full licensing from the Scottish Amateur Football Association. Participating clubs also engage annually in the Highland Amateur Cup, with member clubs having clinched the title eight times throughout its history.

== Member clubs ==
Note: Table lists in alphabetical order.

Team	Location	Ground
Back	Isle of Lewis (Back)	Col Uarach
Carloway	Isle of Lewis (Carloway)	Cnoc a' Choilich
Harris	Harris (Tarbert)	Rally Park
Lochs	Isle of Lewis (Lochs)	Creagan Dubh
Ness	Isle of Lewis (Ness)	Fivepenny
Point	Isle of Lewis (Point)	Garrabost
Stornoway Athletic	Isle of Lewis (Stornoway)	Goathill Park
Stornoway United	Isle of Lewis (Stornoway)	Goathill Park
Westside	Isle of Lewis (Barvas)	Barvas Hall

Lewis & Harris Football Association teams

== Lewis & Harris League ==
List of Lewis & Harris League champions
Season	Champions (number of titles)	Runners-up	Third place
1980	Ness (1)	Point (1)	Stornoway Rovers (1)
1981	Point (1)	Ness (1)	Stornoway Athletic (1)
1982	Ness (2)	Stornoway Athletic (1)	Tolsta (1)
1983	Harris (1)	Point (2)	Ness (1)
1984	Ness (3)	Back (1)	Stornoway Athletic (2)
1985	Ness (4)	Point (3)	Stornoway Athletic (3)
1986	Ness (5)	Point (4)	Stornoway Athletic (4)
1987	Ness (6)	Stornoway Athletic (2)	Lochs (1)
1988	Stornoway Athletic (1)	Ness (2)	Lochs (2)
1989	Ness (7)	Lochs (1)	Stornoway Athletic (5)
1990	Ness (8)	Stornoway Athletic (3)	Stornoway Rovers (2)
1991	Ness (9)	Stornoway Athletic (4)	Lochs (3)
1992	Ness (10)	Point (5)	Stornoway Athletic (6)
1993	Point (2)	Ness (3)	Harris (1)
1994	Ness (11)	Back (2)	Point (1)
1995	Lochs (1)	Back (3)	Ness (2)
1996	Point (3)	Ness (4)	Harris (2)
1997	Point (4)	Stornoway Athletic (5)	Harris (3)
1998	Point (5)	Stornoway Athletic (6)	Harris (4)
1999	Ness (12)	Point (6)	Harris (5)
2000	Back (1)	Harris (1)	Point (2)
2001	Harris (2)	Ness (5)	Lochs (4)
2002	Point (6)	Harris (2)	Back (1)
2003	Lochs (2)	Back (4)	Point (3)
2004	Point (7)	Back (5)	Lochs (5)
2005	Lochs (3)	Stornoway Athletic (7)	Back (2)
2006	Stornoway Athletic (2)	Lochs (2)	Point (4)
2007	Lochs (4)	Back (6)	Stornoway Athletic (7)
2008	Lochs (5)	Back (7)	Carloway (1)
2009	Lochs (6)	Back (8)	Carloway (2)
2010	Lochs (7)	Back (9)	Westside (1)
2011	Back (2)	Carloway (1)	Westside (2)
2012	Stornoway Athletic (3)	Back (10)	Lochs (6)
2013	Carloway (1)	Stornoway Athletic (8)	Westside (3)
2014	Westside (1)	Lochs (3)	Carloway (3)
2015	Lochs (8)	Point (7)	Westside (4)
2016	Lochs (9)	Point (8)	Westside (5)
2017	Carloway (2)	Westside (1)	Point (5)
2018	Point (8)	Lochs (4)	Westside (6)
2019	Westside (2)	Point (9)	Carloway (4)
2020	No competition (due to COVID-19 pandemic)		
2021	Point (9)	Back (11)	Westside (7)
2022	Point (10)	Ness (6)	Westside (8)
2023	Westside (3)	Back (12)	Point (6)
2024	Stornoway Athletic (4)	Point (10)	Westside (9)
2025	Back (3)	Westside (2)	Point (7)
2026	Point (11)	Stornoway Athletic (9)	Harris (6)

=== Total titles won ===
Rank	Club	Winners	Runners-up	Winning seasons
1	Ness	12	6	1980, 1982, 1984, 1985, 1986, 1987, 1989, 1990, 1991, 1992, 1994, 1999
2	Point	11	10	1981, 1993, 1996, 1997, 1998, 2002, 2004, 2018, 2021, 2022, 2026
3	Lochs	9	4	1995, 2003, 2005, 2007, 2008, 2009, 2010, 2015, 2016
4	Stornoway Athletic	4	9	1988, 2006, 2012, 2024
5	Back	3	12	2000, 2011, 2025
5	Westside	3	2	2014, 2019, 2023
7	Harris	2	2	1983, 2001
7	Carloway	2	1	2013, 2017

== Moldova Lewis Cup ==
List of Moldova Lewis Cup finals
Season	Winners	Score	Runners–up
2015	Lochs	^{*}1–1	Point
2016	Lochs	3–1	Carloway
2017	Ness	3–2	Stornoway Athletic
2018	Lochs	2–1	Carloway
2019	Westside	3–1	Point
2020	No competition (due to COVID-19 pandemic)		
2021	No competition (due to COVID-19 pandemic)		
2022	Back	^{*}1–1	Westside
2023	Back	6–1	Westside
2024	Back	3–1	Ness
2025	Point	4–3	Harris
2026	Harris	1–0	Back

^{*} Won on penalties

== Jock Stein Cup ==
List of Jock Stein Cup finals
Season	Winners	Score	Runners–up
2015	Point	1–0	Westside
2016	Point	3–1	Westside
2017	Point	4–0	Westside
2018	Ness	3–2	Westside
2019	Stornoway Athletic	4–0	Lochs
2020	No competition (due to COVID-19 pandemic)		
2021	Back	^{*}2–2	Point
2022	Back	2–1	Point
2023	Back	3–1	Ness
2024	Westside	2–1	Back
2025	Carloway	2–1	Point
2026	Westside	3–1	Point

^{*} Won on penalties

== Western Isles Cup ==
The Western Isles Cup is a competition open to all clubs in the Western Isles, including teams from the Uist & Barra Amateur Football Association.

The competition was previously known as the Co-op Cup due to sponsorship by the Co-op. From 2025, the tournament has been sponsored by MAL Civils, a civil engineering company based in the west of Scotland.

List of Western Isles Cup finals
Season	Winners	Score	Runners–up
2015	Barra	^{*}1–1	Point
2016	Westside	2–1	Iochdar Saints
2017	Westside	3–0	Carloway
2018	Lochs	^{*}3–3	Westside
2019	Point	^{*}1–1	Westside
2020	No competition (due to COVID-19 pandemic)		
2021	No competition (due to COVID-19 pandemic)		
2022	Westside	2–1	Ness
2023	Barra	^{*}3–3	Westside
2024	Westside	6–5	Harris
2025	Back	4–3	Point

^{*} Won on penalties

== Acres Boys Club Cup ==
List of Acres Boys Club Cup finals
Season	Winners	Score	Runners–up
2015	Lochs	2–1	Carloway
2016	Carloway	4–3	Westside
2017	Point	1–0	Westside
2018	Lochs	3–1	Westside
2019	Westside	2–0	Lochs
2020	No competition (due to COVID-19 pandemic)		
2021	No competition (due to COVID-19 pandemic)		
2022	No competition (due to COVID-19 pandemic)		
2023	Westside	2–1	Back
2024	Westside	3–0	Point
2025	Back	^{*}3–3	Harris
2026	Stornoway Athletic	2–1	Westside

^{*} Won on penalties

== Eilean an Fhraoich Cup ==
Eilean an Fhraoich Cup, also known as EAF Cup, is a distinctive competition within the Lewis and Harris Football League. What sets this cup apart is that players represent their home village, regardless of which football club they are signed to. Notably, the town clubs do not enter the competition.

The name Eilean Fraoch, which translates to "Heather Isle" in Scottish Gaelic, is another name for the Isle of Lewis.

List of Eilean Fraoch Cup finals
Season	Winners	Score	Runners–up
2015	Westside	4–2	Back
2016	Carloway	4–2	Lochs
2017	Carloway	5–0	Ness
2018	Westside	3–1	Lochs
2019	Back	2–0	Point
2020	No competition (due to COVID-19 pandemic)		
2021	No competition (due to COVID-19 pandemic)		
2022	No competition (due to COVID-19 pandemic)		
2023	Carloway	3–2	Westside
2024	Westside	5–2	Harris
2025	Westside	5–3	Point
2026	Harris	3–2	Back

== Representative team ==
Select Team colours
Change colours

A 'select' team representing Lewis & Harris periodically enters cup competitions organized by the North Caledonian Football Association.

This team is not the same as the Western Isles representative team, which competes at the Island Games and usually selects players from both the Lewis & Harris and Uist & Barra amateur leagues.

As of 2017, the squad is managed by Kevin Anderson. The team, to date, has triumphed in one cup competition - when they won 1–0 against Golspie Sutherland in the final of the North Caledonian Cup at Dalmore Park, Alness. The match, contested in November 2014, was broadcast with live commentary on BBC Radio nan Gàidheal.

=== Honours ===
- North Caledonian Cup: 2014–15
