= Eriskay F.C. =

Amateur football club based in Eriskay, Scotland

- Full name: Eriskay Football Club
- Founded: 1960
- Ground: Cnoc Na Monadh
- Coordinates: 57°4′45″N 7°18′18″W
- Chairman: Stephen MacDonald
- Manager: Cherry MacAulay
- League: Uist & Barra Amateur Football Association
Home colours

Eriskay FC is an amateur association football club based on the island of Eriskay in the Outer Hebrides of Scotland. They compete in the Uist & Barra Amateur Football Association league.

== History ==
Eriskay FC was established in 1960 by local fishermen. The club features one of the smallest player selection pools in football, as the playing squad often making up more than 10% of the island's total population (around 150 people).

The team has played in green and white striped kits since their foundation as they were inspired by Celtic FC. After their foundation, the club began playing in a Sunday league, leaving time for mass in mornings.

The club enjoyed its most success during the 1960s.

== Ground ==
The club plays its home matches at Cnoc Na Monadh. In 2015, FIFA designated the ground one of the world's eight most unique football pitches.

== 2025 season ==
=== Uist & Barra Amateur League ===
April–September 2025	Eriskay FC	Draw	Barra FC	Cnoc Na Monadh, Eriskay
		(Report)

April–September 2025	Eriskay FC	Draw	Iochdar Saints	Cnoc Na Monadh, Eriskay
		(Report)

April–September 2025	Eriskay FC	Draw	Benbecula	Cnoc Na Monadh, Eriskay
		(Report)

April–September 2025	Eriskay FC	Draw	North Uist United	Cnoc Na Monadh, Eriskay
		(Report)

Note: Eriskay F.C. finished the 10-match league season in 6th place with 0 wins, 4 draws, and 6 defeats.

=== Highland Amateur Cup ===
19 April 2025 Preliminary Round (Western Isles Section)	Eriskay FC	3–6	Westside	Cnoc Na Monadh, Eriskay
11:30		(Report)	Ali Barvas Kenneth Mitchell Gordon Campbell AJ Morrison Ross Macdonald

=== Summer Cup ===
June 2025 Group 1	Benbecula	2–3	Eriskay FC	Sgoil Lionacleit pitch, Benbecula
		(Report)

June 2025 Group 1	Eriskay FC	5–0	Southend	Cnoc Na Monadh, Eriskay
		(Report)

14 June 2025 Summer Cup Final	Eriskay FC	1–2	Barra	Neutral Ground, Benbecula
15:00		(Report)

=== Co-op Cup ===
3 May 2025 Round 1	Iochdar Saints	Loss	Eriskay FC	Dark Island Pitch, Benbecula
		(Report)

== 2026 season ==
13 April 2026	Eriskay	4–1	North Uist United	Cnoc Na Monadh, Eriskay
	Micheal Iain MacInnes; Dominic MacAulay; Craig Ferguson	(Report)

18th April 2026 Highland Amateur Cup	Athletic	6–3	Eriskay FC	Goathill Park
11:00 GMT		Report

== Current squad ==
As of the 2026 Uist & Barra Amateur Football Association season. Note: Flags indicate national team as defined under FIFA eligibility rules; some limited exceptions apply. Players may hold more than one non-FIFA nationality.

No.	Pos.	Nation	Player
1	GK	SCO	Scott MacAulay
2	DF	SCO	Stephen Campbell
3	DF	SCO	Cameron MacSween
4	DF	SCO	DJ MacMillan
5	DF	SCO	Norman MacInnes
6	DF	SCO	Cailean MacQuarrie
7	MF	SCO	Callum Campbell
8	MF	SCO	Micheal Iain MacInnes
9	MF	SCO	Jordan MacPherson
10	MF	SCO	Jonathan Beaton
11	MF	SCO	Jamie Ford
12	MF	SCO	Jamie MacSween

No.	Pos.	Nation	Player
14	FW	SCO	Dominic MacAulay
15	FW	SCO	Craig Ferguson
16	DF	SCO	Ryan MacKinnon
17	MF	SCO	Angus John MacIntyre
18	FW	SCO	Angus MacAllister
19	DF	SCO	Angus MacLellan
20	MF	SCO	Kevin MacAulay
21	MF	SCO	John MacDonald
22	MF	SCO	Ryan MacDonald
23	FW	SCO	Neil MacRury
24	FW	SCO	Seumas MacLean
17	DF	SCO	Liam MacKinnon (captain)

== Notable former players ==
- Martin Compston

== Records ==
- Highest league position: 1st in the Uist and Barra League
- Lowest league position: 6th in the Uist and Barra League
- Best Highland Amateur Cup performance: First Round
- Best Summer Cup performance: Runners-up – 2025
- Biggest home win: 5–0 vs Southend F.C. – June 2025
- Biggest away win: 5–1 vs Southend F.C. – July 2024
