= Uist & Barra Amateur Football Association =

- Country: Scotland
- Confederation: UEFA
- Divisions: 1
- Number of clubs: 6
- Level on pyramid: N/A
- Domestic cups: Billy McNeill Cup; Summer Cup; Co-op Cup; Highland Amateur Cup
- Current champions: Barra
- Website: Official website

The Uist & Barra Amateur Football Association (UBFA) is a football (soccer) league competition for amateur clubs in Uist and Barra in the Hebrides of northwestern Scotland. The association is affiliated to the Scottish Amateur Football Association. Teams in this division also take part in the Highland Amateur Cup and in the Co-op Cup along with clubs from the Lewis & Harris Football Association. Like several other Highland and island leagues, fixtures are played over summer rather than the traditional winter calendar.

The association is composed of a single division of six clubs.

== League Membership ==
In order to join the association, clubs need to apply and are then voted in by current member clubs.

== Member clubs ==
The following clubs play in the Uist & Barra League, Billy McNeill Cup and the Summer cup.

- Benbecula
- Southend
- Iochdar Saints
- North Uist
- Eriskay
- Barra

== Past winners ==
Year	Uist & Barra League	Billy McNeill Cup	Summer cup	Notes
2024	Barra	Barra	Barra	
2025	Barra	Barra	Barra	
