= Potterton =

Village near Aberdeen, Scotland

Coordinates: 57.230°N 02.093°W

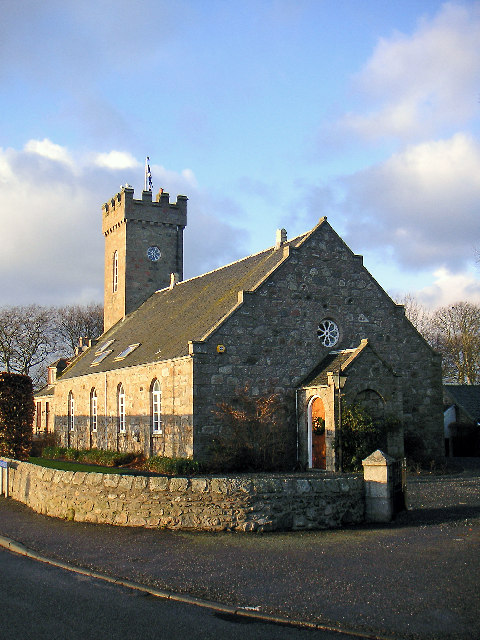
- Potterton Church

- Location within Aberdeenshire
- Population: 850 (2020)
- OS grid reference: NJ943154
- Council area: Aberdeenshire
- Lieutenancy area: Aberdeenshire
- Country: Scotland
- Sovereign state: United Kingdom
- Post town: ABERDEEN
- Postcode district: AB23
- Dialling code: 01358
- Police: Scotland
- Fire: Scottish
- Ambulance: Scottish
- UK Parliament: Gordon and Buchan
- Scottish Parliament: Aberdeenshire East

Potterton is a village in Aberdeenshire, Scotland, 2 miles (3 km) southwest of Balmedie and 6 miles (10 km) north of Aberdeen city centre. The population was 1,159 in 1991, 886 in 2001 and 899 in 2011.

== Development ==
In April 2024, Barratt & David Wilson Homes North Scotland submitted a planning application to Aberdeenshire Council for the construction of 194 homes on land near Manse Road and Denview Road in Potterton. The proposal included 48 affordable homes and represented an investment of around £50 million. The application was subject to council approval.
