= Broad Bay, Lewis =

Bay in Scotland

Coordinates: 58°15′N 6°15′W

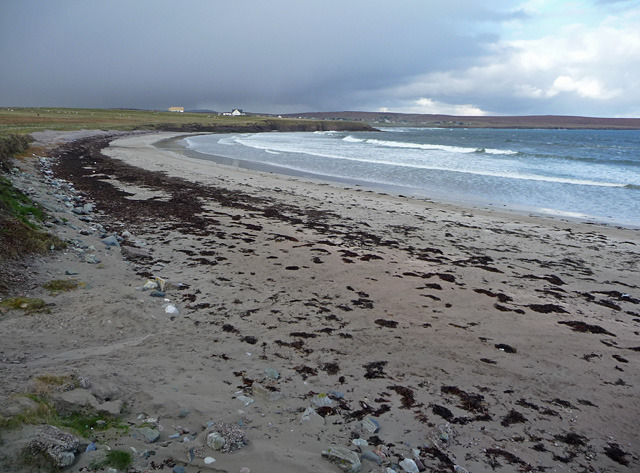
Tràigh Rèbac within Broad Bay

Broad Bay (Scottish Gaelic: Loch a Tuath, meaning "north loch") is a bay which is situated on the coast of Isle of Lewis, and separates Back and Point.
