= Colpy =

Hamlet in Aberdeenshire, Scotland

Coordinates: 57°22′47″N 2°35′49″W

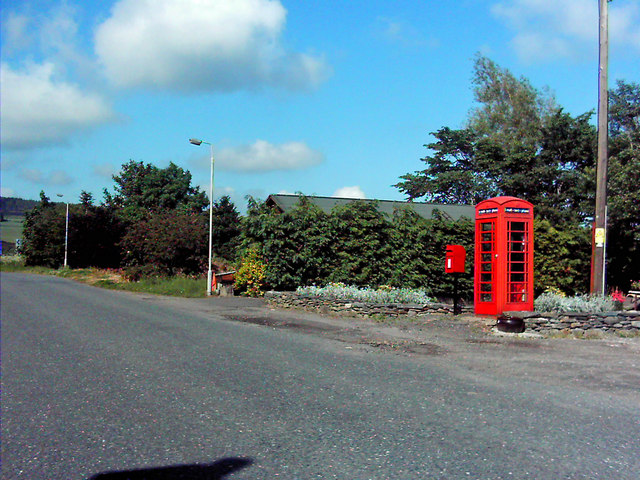
Postbox by the roadside

Colpy is a hamlet in Aberdeenshire, Scotland, situated 3 miles (5 kilometres) north of Insch.
