= Collamoor Head =

Coordinates: 50.7114°N 4.5891°W

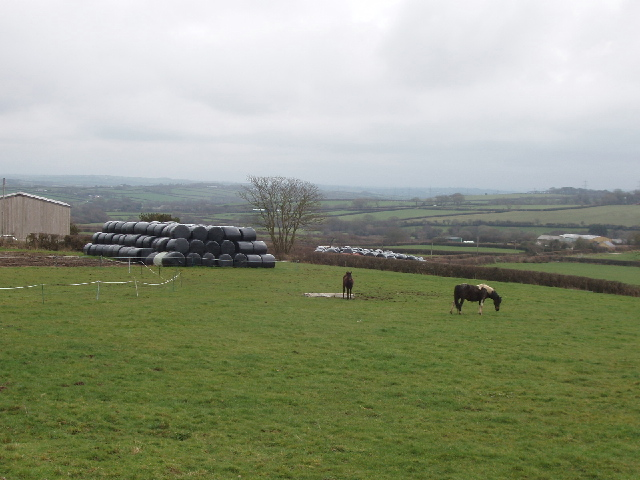
- Newham Farm, Collamoor Head

- Location within Cornwall
- OS grid reference: SX173934
- Civil parish: Otterham
- Unitary authority: Cornwall
- Ceremonial county: Cornwall
- Region: South West
- Country: England
- Sovereign state: United Kingdom
- Post town: Camelford
- Postcode district: PL
- Police: Devon and Cornwall
- Fire: Cornwall
- Ambulance: South Western

Collamoor Head is a junction on the A39 road where it is met from the west by the B3263 road in Cornwall, England. It is in the parish of Otterham.
