= Back, Lewis =

Village in the Outer Hebrides, Scotland

Coordinates: 58.282°N 6.292°W

Back: Scottish Gaelic: Am Bac
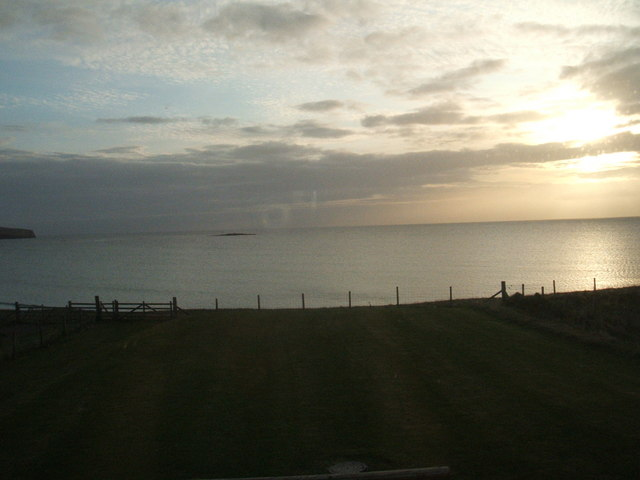
- Morning view from Broad Bay House, Back

- Location within the Outer Hebrides
- Language: Scottish Gaelic; English
- OS grid reference: NB484405
- Civil parish: Stornoway
- Council area: Na h-Eileanan Siar
- Lieutenancy area: Western Isles
- Country: Scotland
- Sovereign state: United Kingdom
- Post town: ISLE OF LEWIS
- Postcode district: HS2
- Dialling code: 01851
- Police: Scotland
- Fire: Scottish
- Ambulance: Scottish
- UK Parliament: Na h-Eileanan an Iar
- Scottish Parliament: Na h-Eileanan an Iar

Back (Scottish Gaelic: Am Bac) is a district and a village in the parish of Stornoway on the east coast of the Isle of Lewis in the Outer Hebrides, Scotland, situated on a coastal area known as Loch a'Tuath, or Broad Bay. The village/district utilises the motto "Tre Dhilseachd Buaidh" (Through Loyalty Success) as seen on the crest of Back FC.

== District villages ==
The district of Back comprises a number of villages, all of which are on the coast of Broadbay. These are: Gearraidh Ghuirm, Upper Coll, Coll, Inner Coll, Vatisker, Back and Gress.

== Transport ==
The district of Back is located approximately five miles from Stornoway by road, and is accessed by the B895 from its junction with the A857 north of Stornoway.

The District of Back is served by the W5 bus route (Mon-Saturday only).

== Back school - Sgoil a'Bhac ==
Sgoil a'Bhac, is a primary and former secondary education school. However, secondary education was discontinued in the early 2010's with future secondary pupils being educated within the Nicolson Institute in Stornoway.

The school currently caters for pupils aged 5 to 11 years, with an enrollment of approx. 190-200 pupils. In addition, the school has a nursery department for pre-school children. The school is structured around two divisions - a 'mainstream' English language division, and a Gaelic medium division in which half the pupils in the school are enrolled, receiving their primary education almost exclusively in the (Scottish) Gaelic language.

Sgoil a'Bhac is a true community school: the school is used for community events every other week. The school also maintains a relationship with the local Free Church of Scotland. The school has a background in Football and Badminton.

== Local community facilities and groups ==
The Hut - Community Hall: a small community hall with a kitchen that provides hall and room hire to local groups and for local meetings and children's parties etc.

Gress Angling Association - are the lease holders and managers of the angling rights to the Gress River. The Angling Association manage and maintain the river and fishing records, and offer children's fishing events and activities. The river is a significant salmon, sea trout and brown trout river, that is tidal for approx. a mile of its course. The river can be fished from June–October (not on Sundays), and a fee is payable either as an annual membership, or as a day ticket. The river operates a catch and release. Information and tickets from: Sportsworld, 1 - 3 Francis Street, Stornoway.

Loch a Tuath News - is a community run monthly magazine that provides local district news, local features and history, and which covers the Tong district as well as Back. The magazine has a Facebook page, and copies can be obtained in local shops and supermarkets as well as by subscription.

Còisir Sgìre a' Bhac - a local traditional Gaelic choir that has enjoyed significant success at the annual Royal National Mod over many years.

The Coll Centre - sports groups, activities and facilities.

== Tourism ==
Although not as well known or visited as some of the main tourism locations in the Outer Hebrides, the District of Back, and its neighbouring districts in Tong and Tolsta have some of the finest beaches in the islands. The District of Back has extensive sandy beaches at Coll, Vatisker and Gress. The District's beaches are being increasingly recognized as excellent surf and water sport locations, year round.

The District's rivers are good for salmon, sea trout and brown trout - there are two small fishable rivers in Coll (The Angus River and Coll River), and the main river at Gress. Permits are required to fish these rivers, but surrounding the district in the moorland areas are a number of lochs (mostly good for brown trout) that can be fished without angling association permits. See Gress Angling Association above for more details.

Due to over-fishing and trawling in the recent past, the District's coast and beaches have a very depleted white fish population.

Wildlife - the area is home to significant populations of coastal and estuary birdlife, raptors and moorland birds. The unique corncrake can also be heard in the district during summer months, as can the cuckoo - making quite a potent nighttime mixture of bird calls - which are added to by the sound of snipe drumming over the estuary and moorlands. Broad Bay has a significant population of seals and other sea mammals.

Tourist Accommodation:

There are a number of quality B&Bs and self-catering facilities in the district.

== Religion ==
The local church is a Free Church of Scotland. Each service is delivered either in English, or Scottish Gaelic. Ministers serving the congregation have included Rev Donald MacMaster (the first incumbent) and Rev Iain D. Campbell. The Rev Calum Iain MacLeod is the current minister at Back Free Church.

== Sport ==
Back Football Club
- Full name: Back FC
- Nicknames: The Blues, Bacachs
- Founded: 1933
- Ground: Coll Centre; Upper Coll; Back; Isle of Lewis
- Chairman: The Clubs Board
- Manager: James 'Bommie' Macurthur
- League: Lewis and Harris Football League

Football is the most popular sport in Back, with some community members attending games. Back F.C. was formed in 1933 and play beside the beach at Upper Coll.

The club have won many trophies since they began, including the highly sought after Eilean Fhraoich Cup on 17 occasions. Only those who live in the district or have close family are eligible to play in the cup.

Andy Gray, who went on to play for the national side, Scotland, as well as Rangers F.C., Wolves F.C., Aston Villa F.C. and Everton F.C., where he won the UEFA Cup Winners' Cup, played for the club as a youth.
