= Cold Blow =

Hamlet in Pembrokeshire, Wales

Coordinates: 51.783°N 4.723°W

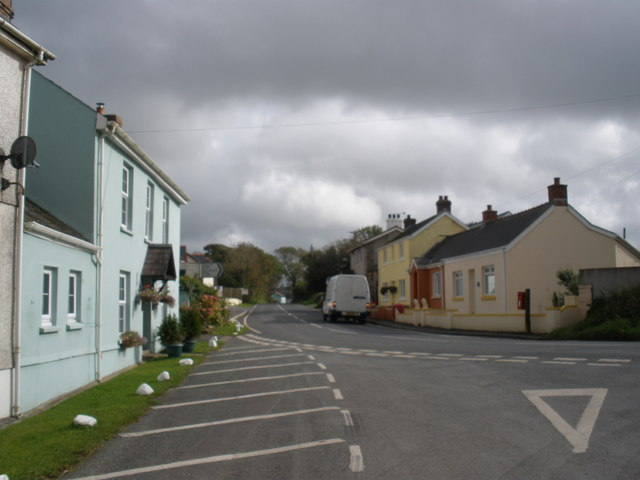
- The B4315 in the village centre

- Location within Pembrokeshire
- OS grid reference: SN123128
- Community: Templeton
- Principal area: Pembrokeshire
- Country: Wales
- Sovereign state: United Kingdom
- Post town: Narberth
- Police: Dyfed-Powys
- Fire: Mid and West Wales
- Ambulance: Welsh

Cold Blow (or Coldblow) is a hamlet about 2 miles (3.2 km) southeast of Narberth in Pembrokeshire, southwest Wales. It lies on the B4315 Princes Gate to Templeton road and is in the community of Templeton.

== Description ==
The hamlet lies on the B4315 road between Princes Gate and Templeton in rural south Pembrokeshire near a junction with the B4314, an early route (now a minor road) to Narberth. There is a mixture of new and old houses and a caravan site.

== History ==
From 1787 Cold Blow would have been known to travellers on the Ireland mail coach from London and Bristol which passed through the hamlet on the way to Milford Haven.

The road through Cold Blow (then referred to as Coldblowgate) was a turnpike when Richard Fenton mentioned it in 1811. In 1822 it was listed as a notable crossroads and an early 19th-century milestone near Cold Blow carrying painted cast-iron plates has been Grade II listed by Cadw.

Leigh's Guide to Wales in 1835 describes Cold Blow:

Consists of only a few houses. It is said to derive its name from the coldness of the wind usually felt there.

The local inn was the Windsor Castle. The hamlet, but not the inn, is mentioned in an 1840 travel guide.

While Cold Blow is now in the local government community and parish of Templeton; it was in the parish of Narberth (South) until 1863.
