= Coll, Lewis =

Coordinates: 58.276°N 6.323°W

Coll: Scottish Gaelic: Col
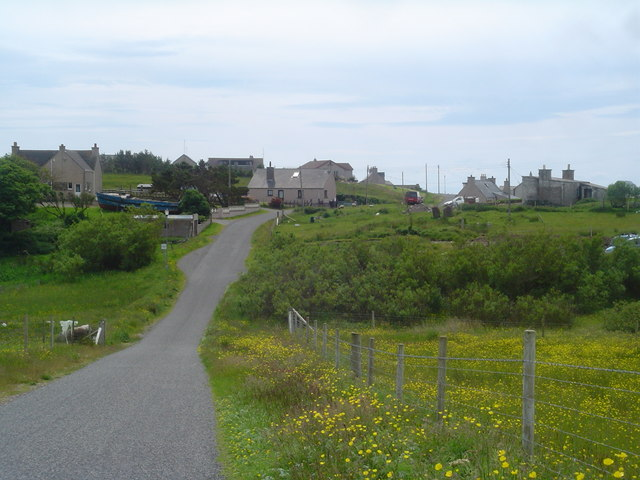
- The single track road which winds through the villages of Inner Coll and Vatisker

- Location within the Outer Hebrides
- Language: Scottish Gaelic; English
- OS grid reference: NB465400
- Civil parish: Stornoway
- Council area: Na h-Eileanan Siar
- Lieutenancy area: Western Isles
- Country: Scotland
- Sovereign state: United Kingdom
- Post town: ISLE OF LEWIS
- Postcode district: HS2
- Dialling code: 01851
- Police: Scotland
- Fire: Scottish
- Ambulance: Scottish
- UK Parliament: Na h-Eileanan an Iar
- Scottish Parliament: Na h-Eileanan an Iar

Coll (Scottish Gaelic: Col) is a farming settlement near Stornoway, on the Isle of Lewis in the Outer Hebrides, Scotland. Coll is situated on the B895, between Stornoway and New Tolsta, and is also within the parish of Stornoway.

== History ==
From 1888 to 1921, Coll and the nearby farmlands of Tong and Gress were the scene of several land raids. This made them the focus of a wider conflict between the people of Lewis, its owners, and the government.

During the 19th century Lewis, like many rural areas of Scotland, became impoverished and depopulated. This was the result of deliberate evictions of tenant farmers by the landowners (the Highland Clearances), harsh living conditions, outright famine in some years, and voluntary emigration in hopes of a better life elsewhere. Towards the start of the 20th century the British government attempted to reverse this trend, by providing land for small farm settlements, allotments or crofts, and by improving the conditions of land tenure. There was also a political promise that servicemen returning from World War I should have “a land fit for heroes to live in” and enjoy priority for such settlements.

This policy was not contentious in England, but Scottish landowners were generally hostile, and able to frustrate it. The Isle of Lewis was exceptional in being owned in its entirety by wealthy industrialists prepared to invest heavily to develop the area – from 1844 by the Matheson family (founders of Jardine Matheson) then from 1917 by William Hesketh Lever, Lord Leverhulme the soap magnate. But as industrialists, their vision of the island's future was industrial – fisheries, tweed manufacture, and the like. They were utterly opposed to land re-settlement, seeing this as perpetuating an outmoded way of life. Meanwhile, the landless people of Lewis found themselves existing in overcrowded, squalid conditions, alongside empty arable acres given over to sheep, deer-stalking or grouse-shooting.

Vigorous agitation for land reform broke out in Ireland from 1880 and soon spread to Scotland. It involved rent strikes, destruction of livestock and farm property, physical occupation of the land, and violence against agents of the landowners. Notable conflicts occurred in Skye, North & South Uist, Tiree and Lewis, with part of the farm of Coll being occupied in a land raid of January 1888. This phase of agitation died down when the Highland economy recovered from its 1880s slump and when optimism grew about government action towards land reform.

The government did pass supportive legislation, but progress in actually allocating land was very slow, and further slowed by the outbreak of war in 1914. But after the war, there was strong public support for the returning servicemen, high expectations, and pressure to make good the political promise. Expectation soon turned into anger at official delay, and land raids resumed.

On Lewis, Lord Leverhulme the new landowner had ambitious plans for the island and these – and the substantial investment and employment he was bestowing – initially made him popular. But when his opposition to land settlement schemes became generally known in March 1919, the farmlands of Tong, Coll and Gress were raided.

By autumn the raiders were persuaded to leave, but in January 1920 they made new raids on Coll and Gress, and this time began to build houses there. Leverhulme's response was to stop all his development work, initially just in that district, then throughout Lewis. This caused uproar. His specific objection to re-settlement of Coll and Gress was that they were needed as dairy farms to supply the town of Stornoway. His condition for resumption of development was for the raiders to withdraw; by way of compromise he offered to make land available on the west coast of the island. He also wrung from the government an agreement that they would not use their compulsory powers in support of land settlement on Lewis for ten years, provided his development works continued. On this basis, the raiders were again persuaded to leave in autumn 1920.

Several farms on the west coast of Lewis were indeed re-settled, just in time to forestall land raids there, but in spring 1921 Coll and Gress were again raided, and again Leverhulme responded by halting his developments. The government thus felt released from its undertaking not to invoke compulsory powers. Faced with this official determination, Leverhulme conceded to resettlement of the entire farms of Coll and Gress, and part of Orinsay in the south of Lewis, rather than lose them piecemeal by legal action.

Conflict on Lewis continued around the farm of Galson (near the northern tip of the island), but by this stage Leverhulme was giving up on his plans for Lewis, and turning his attention to adjoining Harris. He was also becoming seriously overstretched financially. In 1925, he died and his many projects on Harris and Lewis were abruptly ended.

== See also ==
- Camastianavaig - site of the "Battle of the Braes"
- Glendale, Skye

== Bibliography ==
The making of the crofting community James Hunter, John Donald, Edinburgh 1976

Fit for heroes? Land settlement in Scotland after World War I Leah Leneman, Aberdeen University Press 1989

Lord of the Isles Nigel Nicolson, Weidenfeld & Nicolson, London 1960
