= Cockshead =

Village in Ceredigion, Wales

Coordinates: 52°10′50″N 4°00′05″W

- Location within Ceredigion
- OS grid reference: SN 6325 5546
  - Cardiff: 59.9 mi (96.4 km)
  - London: 171.9 mi (276.6 km)
- Community: Llanddewibrefi
- Principal area: Ceredigion
- Country: Wales
- Sovereign state: United Kingdom
- Post town: Tregaron
- Postcode district: SY25
- Police: Dyfed-Powys
- Fire: Mid and West Wales
- Ambulance: Welsh
- UK Parliament: Ceredigion Preseli
- Senedd Cymru – Welsh Parliament: Ceredigion

Cockshead is a small village in the community of Llanddewi Brefi, Ceredigion, Wales, which is 59.9 miles (96.3 km) from Cardiff and 171.9 miles (276.5 km) from London. Cockshead is represented in the Senedd by Elin Jones (Plaid Cymru) and is part of the Ceredigion constituency in the House of Commons.

== See also ==
- List of localities in Wales by population
