= Coed Morgan =

Village in Monmouthshire, Wales

Coordinates: 51°47′53″N 2°56′05″W

Coed Morgan is a village and rural area in Monmouthshire, south east Wales, in the United Kingdom.

== Location ==
Coed Morgan is situated four miles east of Abergavenny close to the villages of Llanddewi Rhydderch and Llanarth.

== History and amenities ==
Coed Morgan is set in rolling Monmouthshire countryside with a range of agricultural uses.
