= Coalcleugh =

Hamlet in Northumberland, England

Coordinates: 54.804°N 2.305°W

- Location within Northumberland
- OS grid reference: NY805455
- Unitary authority: Northumberland
- Ceremonial county: Northumberland
- Region: North East
- Country: England
- Sovereign state: United Kingdom
- Post town: HEXHAM
- Postcode district: NE47
- Police: Northumbria
- Fire: Northumberland
- Ambulance: North East
- UK Parliament: Hexham

Coalcleugh is a hamlet in Northumberland, England. It is situated in the Pennines between Penrith and Hexham. In the past it was well known as a lead mining centre. All of Coalcleugh's lead ore was smelted at Allenheads Mill at Dirtpot. At 1750ft (530m) above sea level, it is said to be the highest hamlet in England.

== Governance ==
Coalcleugh is in the parliamentary constituency of Hexham.
