= Cole Henley =

Hamlet in Hampshire, England

Coordinates: 51.256210°N 1.32853°W

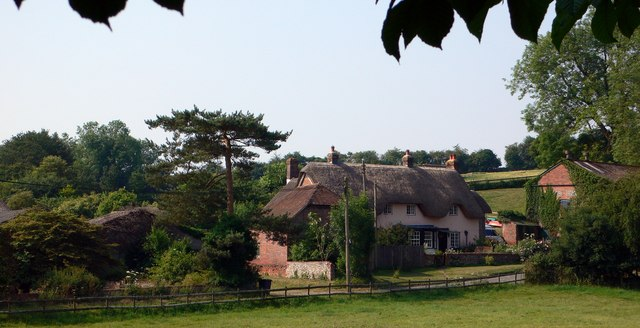
- Cottages at Cole Henley

- Location within Hampshire
- OS grid reference: SU4695550997
- Civil parish: Whitchurch
- District: Basingstoke and Deane
- Shire county: Hampshire
- Region: South East
- Country: England
- Sovereign state: United Kingdom
- Post town: WHITCHURCH
- Postcode district: RG28 7
- Dialling code: 01256
- Police: Hampshire and Isle of Wight
- Fire: Hampshire and Isle of Wight
- Ambulance: South Central
- UK Parliament: Basingstoke

Cole Henley is a hamlet in the Basingstoke and Deane district of Hampshire, England. Its nearest town is Whitchurch, which lies approximately 3.1 miles (5.0 km) south-east from the hamlet, just off the A34 road.

== Governance ==
The hamlet is part of the civil parish and ward of Whitchurch, part of Basingstoke and Deane borough council. The borough council is a Non-metropolitan district of Hampshire County Council.
