= Cornhill, Aberdeen =

Area of Aberdeen, Scotland

Coordinates: 57.159°N 2.134°W

Cornhill
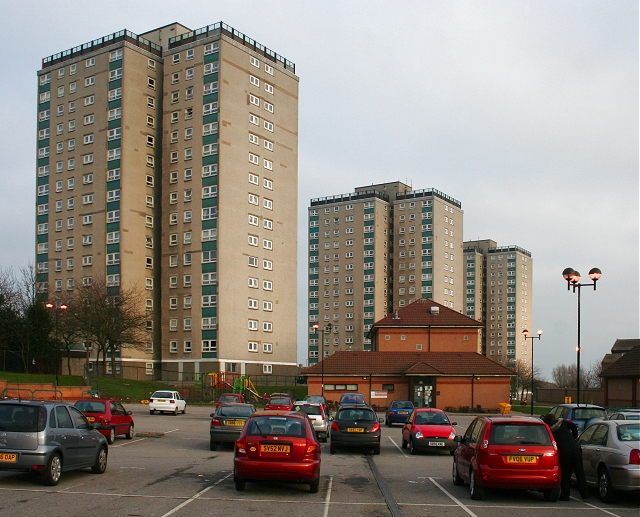
- Tower blocks in Cornhill

- Location within the Aberdeen City council area Location within Scotland
- Council area: Aberdeen City
- Lieutenancy area: Aberdeen
- Country: Scotland
- Sovereign state: United Kingdom
- Postcode district: AB
- Police: Scotland
- Fire: Scottish
- Ambulance: Scottish

Cornhill is an area of Aberdeen, Scotland.

At the west there is a bar (Murdos), the small Cornhill Shopping Centre whose main store is a Aldi supermarket, to the south it stretches as far as Forresterhill Hospital and to the east its area covers as far as Ashgrove.

Socially Cornhill consists mainly of council housing including three tower blocks; Cairncry Court, Cornhill Court, and Rosehill Court.

The Royal Cornhill Hospital offers specialised treatment in regard to psychiatric matters for residents of northern Scotland.
