= Colpitts Grange =

Coordinates: 54.894°N 2.025°W

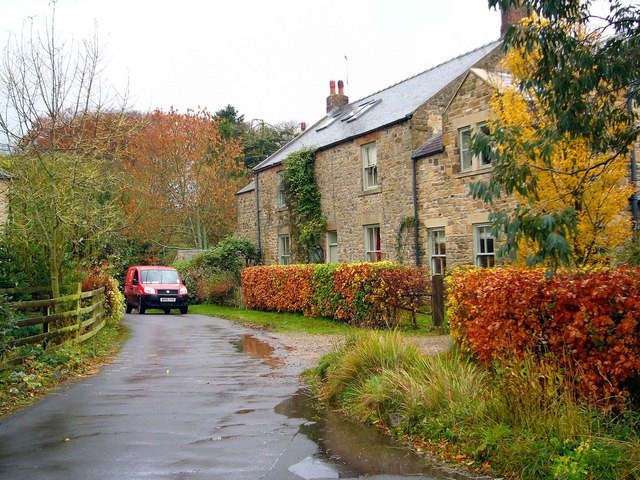

- Location within Northumberland
- OS grid reference: NY985555
- Civil parish: Slaley
- Unitary authority: Northumberland
- Ceremonial county: Northumberland
- Region: North East
- Country: England
- Sovereign state: United Kingdom
- Post town: HEXHAM
- Postcode district: NE47
- Police: Northumbria
- Fire: Northumberland
- Ambulance: North East
- UK Parliament: Hexham

Colpitts Grange is a hamlet in the civil parish of Slaley, in Northumberland, England. It is about 7 miles (11 km) to the south-east of Hexham.

== Governance ==
Colpitts Grange is in the parliamentary constituency of Hexham.
