= Cole Green, Hertfordshire =

Hamlet in Hertfordshire, England

Coordinates: 51°47′15″N 0°08′35″W

Cole Green
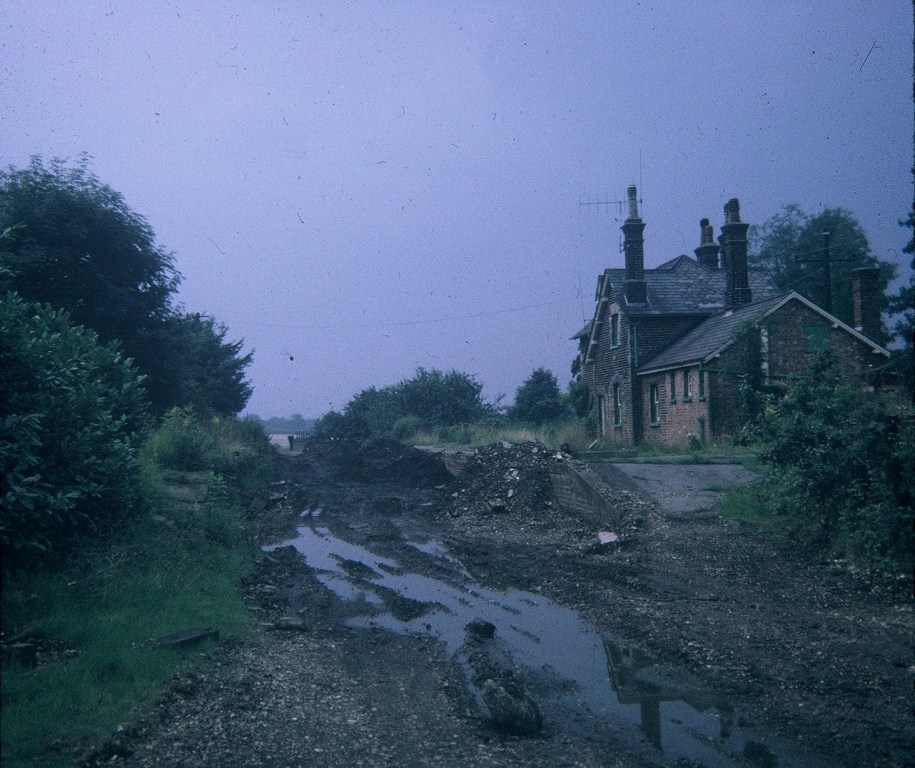
- Cole Green Station in 1968, prior to demolition

- Location within Hertfordshire
- District: East Hertfordshire
- Shire county: Hertfordshire
- Region: East
- Country: England
- Sovereign state: United Kingdom
- Post town: Hertford
- Postcode district: SG14
- Police: Hertfordshire
- Fire: Hertfordshire
- Ambulance: East of England
- UK Parliament: North East Hertfordshire

Cole Green is a hamlet in Hertfordshire, England. It is 1 mile (1.6 km) south-east of Welwyn Garden City just off the A414. It is in the Hertingfordbury Ward of East Herts District Council. Residents of note include Sky Sports boxing commentator Nick Halling.

It formerly had a railway station on the Hertford and Welwyn Junction Railway.
