= Alexander Steuart =

Scottish inventor (1884 – 1960)

Alexander Steuart PRSSA FRSE (1884 – 1960) was a 20th century Scottish inventor and horologist. In 1921 he patented the Steuart Clock an early accurate electric clock.

== Life ==
He was born in Broxburn, West Lothian on 12 September 1884, the son of Daniel Rankin Steuart and his wife Margaret Osborne. He was educated at George Watson's College. He was then apprenticed as an electrical engineer at King & Co on Prince Regent Street in Leith. He then studied Electrical Engineering at Heriot-Watt College in Edinburgh. Around 1905 he went to Bolivia as a mining engineer. He then worked in the automobile industry for around a decade, working largely on instrument design, working variously in Singapore, Glasgow and Birmingham.

Around 1920 he returned to Edinburgh and set up a radio and electric clock shop at 85 Pitt Street (now called Dublin Street). From 1930 he ran Jenners Department Store's electrical department on Princes Street.

In 1938 he succeeded Alexander Robert Horne as President of the Royal Scottish Society of Arts. In 1941 he was elected a Fellow of the Royal Society of Edinburgh. His proposers were Sir Thomas Henry Holland, Alexander Robert Horne, Richard Stanfield, Sir Thomas Hudson Beare, John Barber Todd, James Robert Milne, Thomas Rowatt and Francis Gibson Baily.

In the Second World War he was seconded to the design of aircraft instrumentation for the Ministry of Aircraft Production.

In the British Empire Exhibition of 1924/25 he exhibited an electric regulator and electric turret movement.

He died on 11 September 1960 at the Western General Hospital in Edinburgh, the day before his 76th birthday.

== Family ==
In 1911 he married Barbare Helene Mieras.

== Publications ==
- An Electric Clock with Detached Pendulum (1924)
