= Aberdeen Tramways =

Aberdeen Tramways may refer to:

- Aberdeen Corporation Tramways (1898–1958)
- Aberdeen District Tramways (1874–1898), predecessor of the above
- Aberdeen Suburban Tramways (1904–1927)
