= Paul Bunge Prize =

The Paul Bunge Prize is an international award for seminal and lasting contributions to the history of scientific instruments. Endowed in 1993 by the late Hans R. Jenemann (1920–1996), glass chemist at Schott AG in Mainz, and collector and historian of antique chemical balances. The name of the prize commemorates the leading German maker of precision balances in the nineteenth century Paul Bunge (1839–1888). The Prize is given by the Hans R. Jenemann Foundation and jointly administered by the German Chemical Society and the Deutsche Bunsen-Gesellschaft für Physikalische Chemie.

== Bunge Prize Laureates ==
- 2026 David Singerman, Charlottesville, USA
- 2025 Paola Bertucci, New Haven, USA
- 2024 Peter Heering, Flensburg; Rebekah Higgitt, Edinburgh, UK
- 2023 Robert W. Smith, Alberta, Canada
- 2022 Matthew L. Jones, New York, USA
- 2021 Liba Taub, Cambridge, UK
- 2020 Simon Werrett, London, UK
- 2019 Sara J. Schechner, Cambridge, MA
- 2018 Anthony John Turner, Le Mesnil-le-Roi, France
- 2017 Simon Schaffer, Cambridge, UK
- 2016 Robert G. W. Anderson, Cambridge, UK
- 2015 Brian Gee (posthumously), Chelsea, UK
- 2014 Cyrus C. M. Mody, Houston, TX
- 2013 Marco Beretta, Bologna, Italy
- 2012 David Pantalony, Ottawa, Canada
- 2011 Matteo Valleriani, Berlin, Germany
- 2010 Henning Schmidgen, Weimar, Germany
- 2009 Jutta Schickore, Bloomington, IN
- 2008 Alison Morrison-Low, Edinburgh, UK
- 2007 Charlotte Bigg, Berlin, Germany
- 2006 Davis Baird, Columbia, SC; Inge Keil, Augsburg, Germany
- 2005 Myles W. Jackson, Salem, OR
- 2004 Jobst Broelmann, Munich, Germany; Carsten Reinhardt, Regensburg, Germany
- 2003 Sean F. Johnston, Glasgow, UK
- 2002 Paolo Brenni, Florence, Italy
- 2001 Jim Bennett, Oxford, UK
- 2000 Alan Q. Morton, London, UK; Richard J. Sorrenson, Bloominton, IN
- 1999 Nicolas Rasmussen, Sydney, Australia
- 1998 Robert Bud, London, UK; Deborah J. Warner, Washington, DC
- 1997 Silvio A. Bedini, Washington, DC
- 1996 David A. King, Frankfurt/Main, Germany
- 1995 Gerald L'Estrange Turner, Oxford, UK
- 1994 Otto Sibum, Cambridge, UK; Matthias Dörries, Munich, Germany
- 1992–1993 Klaus Hentschel, Hamburg, Germany; Mara Miniati, Florence, Italy

== Literature ==
- Charlotte Bigg & Christoph Meinel (eds.), Paul Bunge Prize: History of Scientific Instruments, 1993-2023 (Frankfurt/Main: GDCh & DBG, 2023), 96 pp.
