= Mungo Ponton =

British photography pioneer

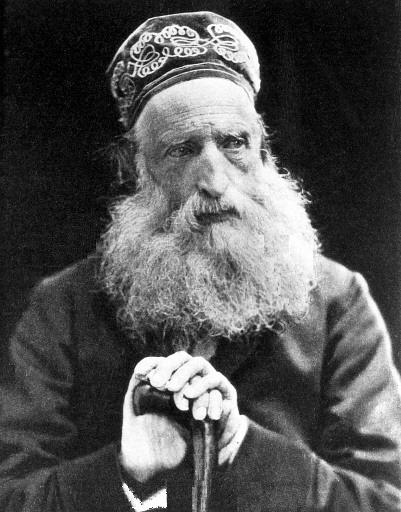
Mungo Ponton

Mungo Ponton FRS FRSE (20 November 1801 – 3 August 1880) was a Scottish inventor who in 1839 created a method of permanent photography based on potassium dichromate.

== Life and family ==
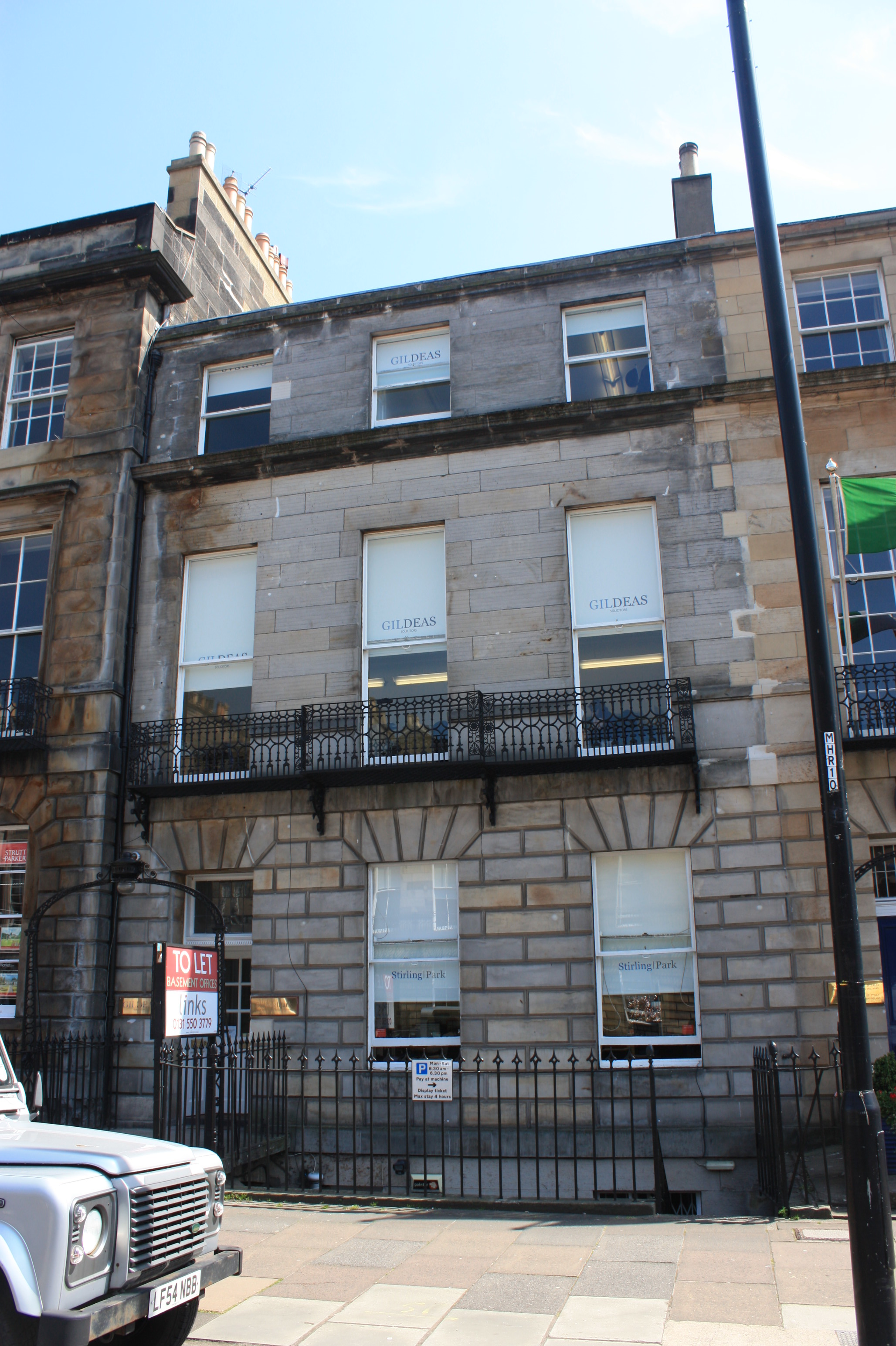
Ponton's house at 30 Melville Street, Edinburgh

Ponton was born in the Balgreen district of west Edinburgh, the son of John Ponton, a farmer. He was named after the explorer Mungo Park, then a new Scottish hero.

In 1815 he was apprenticed as a lawyer to James Balfour WS (of Pilrig House), working at chambers at 17 Broughton Street in the eastern New Town of Edinburgh. He finished his apprenticeship at GL Finlay WS at 18 Queen Street. He was created a Writer to the Signet on the 8th of December 1825. He then went into a partnership with AW Goldie to create Goldie & Ponton WS based at 58 India Street in the western New Town.

He married Helen Scott Campbell on 24 June 1830 and together they had seven children. In the 1830s Ponton was listed as living at 30 Melville Street, a large new terraced townhouse in Edinburgh's west end, presumably the family's home. From 1838 he became the Resident Law Officer and Secretary to the National Bank of Scotland at 42 St Andrew Square.

His first wife died on 7 August 1842, and on 7 November 1843 he married his second wife, Margaret Ponton (possibly related), with whom he had a son. They continued to live at 30 Melville Street.

Ponton suffered a breakdown around 1845 and moved to Bristol, England for its milder climate. He married his third wife, Jean McLean, on 1 August 1871.

Ponton died at his home in Clifton, Bristol on 3 August 1880.

== Inventor ==
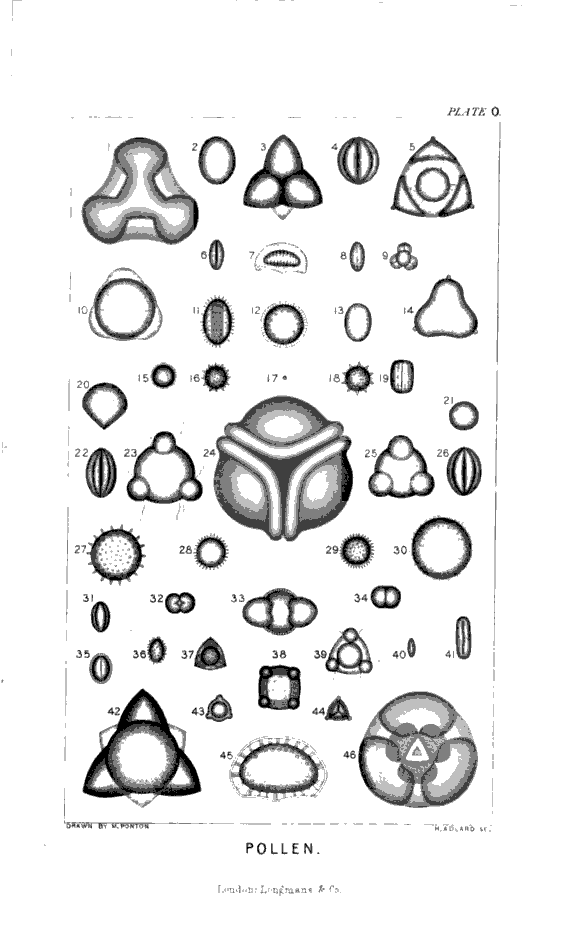
A plate of drawings of pollen from Ponton's book The Beginning: Its When and Its How (1871)

Ponton's fame predates his photographic discoveries, even if he is mainly remembered for his contributions to photography.

On 20 June 1834, Ponton became a Fellow of the Royal Society of Edinburgh. His proposers were John Shank More, James Nairne, Thomas Stewart Traill, David Boswall Reid, Robert Allan and James Finlay Weir Johnston. In 1838, the Scottish Society of Arts awarded Ponton the silver medal for his contributions to the development of the electrical telegraph.

In 1839, while experimenting with an early photographic process published that year by Henry Fox Talbot, Ponton discovered the light-sensitising effect of potassium dichromate. He presented his findings to the Scottish Society of Arts on 29 May. Ponton did not attempt to patent his photographic process and published his findings in the Edinburgh New Philosophical Journal. Others experimented with his discovery, including Talbot, Edmond Becquerel, Alphonse Poitevin, and John Pouncy, some of whom patented their photographic techniques. Dichromate sensitisation provided the basis for the carbon print and gum bichromate photographic processes, as well as some photoresists used in the printing industry and other industrial applications.

Ponton continued to work on photography and in 1845 the Society again awarded him a silver medal for his process for measuring the hourly variation in temperature on photographic paper. That year he also developed a variation on the calotype process to allow shorter exposure times.

== Publications ==
- The Great Architect; as Manifested in the Material Universe (1866)
- Earthquakes and Volcanoes: Their History, Phenomena, and Probable Causes (1868)
- The Beginning: Its When and Its How (1871)
- Glimpses of the Future Life (1873)
- Songs of the Soul: Philosophical Moral and Devotional (1877)

== External sources ==
- "Mungo Ponton". The Online Books Page, University of Pennsylvania.
