= John Atwell (engineer) =

Scottish engineer

Sir John William Atwell CBE PRSE FREng FIMechE (24 November 1911 – 5 July 1999) was a Scottish engineer.

== Life ==
John Atwell was born in Glasgow in 1911, the son of William Atwell (d. 1953) and his wife, Sarah Workman. He was educated at Hyndland Secondary School in Glasgow before serving an apprenticeship with Yarrow Shipbuilders in Scotstoun.

In 1939, he was awarded an MSc from King's College, Cambridge, where he studied as a Caird Travelling Scholar. During the Second World War, he worked as a manager at Stewarts & Lloyds, one of the largest shell manufacturers in Britain at the time.

Atwell was elected a Fellow of the Royal Society of Edinburgh in 1963. His proposers included Sir Samuel Curran, John Currie Gunn, Sir David Stirling Anderson, and Frederick Malloch Bruce. He served as Treasurer of the Society from 1977 to 1982 and as President from 1982 to 1985. In recognition of his service, he was awarded the Society’s Bicentenary Medal in 1992.

From 1968 to 1970, he served as Chairman of the Weir Group. He was awarded an honorary doctorate (LLD) by University of Strathclyde in 1973.

Atwell was appointed a Commander of the British Empire (CBE) in 1970 and was knighted by Queen Elizabeth II in 1976. He died in Glasgow; his remains were cremated.

== Family ==
In 1945, he married Dorothy Baxter, sister of his friend, Allan Baxter.

== Sources ==
- C D Waterston; A Macmillan Shearer (July 2006). Former Fellows of The Royal Society of Edinburgh, 1783–2002: Part 1 (A–J) (PDF). RSE Scotland Foundation. ISBN 090219884X. Archived from the original (PDF) on 24 January 2013.
