= Maurice Say =

British electrical engineer

Prof Maurice George Say FRSE (1902–1992) was a 20th-century British electrical engineer who served as the head of electrical engineering at Heriot-Watt College for 30 years. Friends knew him as Dick Say and in authorship he is M. G. Say.

== Life ==
He was born in London on 8 June 1902 the son of Henry Robert Say and his wife, Elizabeth Sarah Eckersall. He was educated at Colfe's Grammar School in Horn Park east of London. He then studied electrical engineering at Imperial College, London under Prof T Mather, G W O Howe and Parker Smith, graduating BSc in 1921. Continuing as a postgraduate he studied commutator machines and gained an MSc before gaining a doctorate (PhD) on the topic of railway electrification (assisted by Sir Philip Dawson).

After a brief spell in industry he joined the Royal Technical College in Glasgow in 1926. In 1933 he received a professorship from Heriot-Watt in Edinburgh, remaining there for the remainder of his career.

In 1935 he was elected a Fellow of the Royal Society of Edinburgh. His proposers were James Cameron Smail, Alexander Robert Horne, Sir Thomas Hudson Beare, and John Brown Clark.

In 1960/61 he presented the Faraday Lectures to the Institution of Electrical Engineers. In 1960 he also presented the Bernard Price Memorial Lecture in South Africa.

He retired in 1963 just before Heriot Watt was given university status. They awarded him an honorary doctorate (DSc) in 1985.

== Death ==
He died on 14 November 1992.

== Family ==
In 1926, he married Eileen Mary Ashworth. They had a daughter, Monica Ashworth Say (born on 5 November 1927 in Glasgow), and a son, David Giles Ashworth Say (born on 11 May 1939 in Glasgow).

== Publications ==
- Performance and Design of A/C Machines (1936)
- Electrical Engineers Reference Book (1945) and many later editions
- Analogue and Digital Computers (1960)
- Unified Theory of Electromagnetic Machines (1971)
- A/C Machines (1983)
- D/C Machines (1986) (co-written with Eric Openshaw Taylor)
