= Eric Taylor =

Eric Taylor may refer to:

- Eric Taylor (artist) (1909–1999), British artist
- Eric Taylor (gridiron football) (born 1981), American and Canadian football defensive tackle
- Eric Taylor (football manager) (1912–1974), English football manager
- Eric Taylor (musician) (1949-2020), American singer and songwriter
- Eric Taylor (screenwriter) (1897–1952), Hollywood screenwriter
- Eric Openshaw Taylor (died 1987), British electrical engineer and scientific author
- Eric Taylor (Friday Night Lights), a character on Friday Night Lights
