= Eric Openshaw Taylor =

British electrical engineer

Prof Eric Openshaw Taylor FRSE PRSSA FIEE (c.1900–1987) was a 20th-century British electrical engineer and scientific author. He was an early advocate of the use of nuclear power to create electricity.

== Life ==
He studied Electrical Engineering at the University of London graduating BSc.

He became Professor of Electrical engineering at Heriot-Watt University in Edinburgh.

In 1944 he was elected a Fellow of the Royal Society of Edinburgh. His proposers were Maurice Say, James Cameron Smail, Nicholas Lightfoot and James Sandilands.

In 1956 he succeeded Robert Waldron Plenderleith as President of the Royal Scottish Society of Arts.

He died at Furze Hill in southern England on 16 October 1987.

== Publications ==
- Power Systems Economics
- Utilisation of Electric Energy
- Performance and Design of A/C Commutator Motors
- Watt, Faraday and Parsons
- Electromechanical Energy Conversion
- Direct Current Machines (with Maurice George Say)
- Nuclear Reactors for Power Generation
- Electric Power Distribution
- Nuclear Power Plant
