= James Robert Milne =

Scottish physicist

James Robert Milne PRSSA FRSE (c. 1880 – 3 February 1961) was a 20th-century Scottish physicist. He served as president of the Royal Scottish Society of Arts from 1923 to 1925.

== Life ==
He graduated with a BSc from the University of Edinburgh in 1899.

He was an early radio engineer and ran the Edinburgh and District Radio Society from around 1900.

In 1904 he was elected a Fellow of the Royal Society of Edinburgh. His proposers were James Gordon MacGregor, Cargill Gilston Knott, William Peddie, and George Chrystal. He lived at 11 Melville Crescent in Edinburgh's West End.

In 1908 he was elected a Fellow of the Royal Scottish Society of Arts. In 1923 he succeeded Richard Stanfield as President of the society. In 1925 he was succeeded by Robert Stuart Pilcher.

From 1912 to 1946 he lectured in physics at the University of Edinburgh.

He died in Edinburgh on 3 February 1961.
