= Robert Stuart Pilcher =

Early 20th century British transport engineer and author

Robert Stuart Pilcher CBE FRSE (1882–1961) was an early 20th century British transport engineer and influential author on transport policy. He gives his name to the Pilcher: a pullman-style tram serving in Manchester from the 1930s.

== Life ==
He was born in Liverpool on 28 January 1882. The son of Annie and Edward Pilcher of Irish ancestry, living at 11 Tancred Road. He was educated at Wallasey in Cheshire then was apprenticed as a tram engineer at the Montreal Street Railway Company in Canada.

Returning to Britain he became General Manager and Chief Engineer of Aberdeen Corporation Tramways in 1906. In 1918 he moved to the Edinburgh Corporation Tramways. The Aberdeen system was a conventional Overhead Electric system, the Edinburgh system being cable-hauled. On the unification of Leith with Edinburgh in 1920 Pilcher became responsible for the upgrading of the Edinburgh system, abandoning mechanical haulage and introducing electrification to match the Overhead Electric system already in use in Leith.

From 1925 to 1927 he was President of the Royal Scottish Society of Arts. In 1928 he was elected a Fellow of the Royal Society of Edinburgh. His proposers were Richard Stanfield, Thomas Hudson Beare, Francis Gibson Baily and Arthur Pillans Laurie. Soon after election, in 1929, he left Edinburgh to become General Manager of Manchester Corporation Transport, a far larger transport system.

In 1943 he was created a Commander of the Order of the British Empire.

He died on 7 August 1961.

== Family ==
In 1909 he married Louise Conway Gordon Niven or Neven.

== Publications ==
- Road Transport Operation: Passengers (1930)
- Road Passenger Transport (1937)
