= Frederick Bruce =

Frederick Bruce may refer to:

- F. F. Bruce (Frederick Fyvie Bruce, 1910–1990), Scottish Biblical scholar
- Frederick Bruce (diplomat) (1814–1867), British diplomat
- Frederick Malloch Bruce (1912–1997), Scottish electrical engineer and educationalist

== See also ==
- Frederick Nanka-Bruce (1878–1953), physician, journalist and politician in the Gold Coast
- Frederick Bruce-Lyle (1953–2016), Ghanaian-born judge who served in the Caribbean
