= David Stirling Anderson =

Scottish engineer and educationalist

Sir David Stirling Anderson FRSE
- Born: 25 September 1895; Glasgow, Scotland
- Died: 18 January 1981 (aged 85); Helensburgh, Scotland
- Spouse(s): Grace Boyd (m. 1932; died 1974) Lorna Ticehurst (m. 1974)

David Stirling Anderson (25 September 1895 – 18 January 1981) was a 20th-century Scottish engineer and educationalist.

== Life ==
He was born in Glasgow on 25 September 1895, the son of Alexander Anderson and his wife, Sarah Stirling. In the First World War he served as a 2nd Lieutenant in the Royal Air Force.

He graduated from the Royal College of Science and Technology (now Strathclyde University) in 1921. From 1924 he was Head of Derby Technical College and in 1930 became Principal of Birmingham College of Advanced Technology. In 1946 he returned to Glasgow to head his alma mater, the Royal Technical College. In 1951 he was elected a Fellow of the Royal Society of Edinburgh. His proposers were James Cameron Smail, Hugh Bryan Nisbet, Maurice Say and William Marshall Smart. He was knighted by Queen Elizabeth II in 1957 for services to education.

He died in Helensburgh on 18 January 1981.

== Family ==
He married twice: firstly in 1932 to Grace Boyd, and following her death in 1974 he married Lorna Ticehurst.
