= RSSA =

RSSA may refer to:

- Royal Scottish Society of Arts
- Royal Society of South Africa
- Royal Society of South Australia
