= Sibum =

Sibum is a surname. Notable people with the surname include:

- Bas Sibum (born 1982), Dutch football manager and player
- Otto Sibum (born 1956), German historian of science
