= Robert Waldron Plenderleith =

Scottish engineer and museum curator (1901-1974)

Robert Waldron Plenderleith FRSE (1901–1974) was a 20th-century Scottish engineer and museum curator. From 1953 to 1956 he was President of the Royal Scottish Society of Arts. He was also President of the Astronomical Society of Edinburgh 1959/60 and Chairman of the Edinburgh Scientific Film Society 1963 until death. In authorship he is known as R. W. Plenderleith.

== Life ==
Robert Plenderleith was born in Coatbridge on 24 November 1901. He was the son of Robert James Plenderleith who was art master at Harris Academy in Dundee and Robert was consequently educated there. His elder brother was Harold Plenderleith FRSE. Harold's career was somewhat parallel to Robert's but greatly overshadowed that of Robert.

He was too young to serve in the First World War (unlike Harold). He studied engineering at St Andrews University from 1918, graduating BSc in 1922. He then trained with the British Electric Plant Co. and the Harland Engineering Company before beginning as an engineer surveyor at the National Boiler Company in 1926.

In 1935 his private interests brought him the position of Assistant Keeper at the Royal Scottish Museum on Chambers Street in Edinburgh and in March 1957 he became full Keeper of the Technology Department of the Museum.

In the Second World War he served as District Transport Manager for the Glasgow district, organising transport for military forces.

In 1957 he was elected a Fellow of the Royal Society of Edinburgh. His proposers were Douglas Allan, Hugh Bryan Nisbet, Sir J. Donald Pollock, David Alan Stevenson II and James Cameron Smail.

In 1965 he made a memorable visit to the Science Museum, London to critique the Freedom 7 space exhibition, which had held the astronaut Alan Shepard.

He retired in 1966 and died at home, 25 Findhorn Place in Edinburgh on 22 November 1974, a few days before his 73rd birthday.

== Publications ==
- An Old Scottish Yard and Ell Measure (1959)
- Discovery of an Old Astrolabe (1960)
