= Alan Ogilvie =

Alan Ogilvie may refer to:

- David Ogilvie (cricketer) (Alan David Ogilvie, born 1951), Australian cricketer
- Alan Grant Ogilvie (1887–1954), Scottish geographer
