= Myles Jackson =

American historian (born 1964)

Myles W. Jackson
- Born: November 25, 1964; Paterson, New Jersey
- Education: Ph.D. in History and Philosophy of Science
- Alma mater: Cambridge University
- Occupation: Professor
- Organization(s): The Institute for Advanced Study, New Jersey, USA

Myles W. Jackson (born 25 November 1964 in Paterson, New Jersey) is the inaugural Ernst and Elisabeth Albers-Schönberg Professor in the History of Science at the Institute for Advanced Study in Princeton, New Jersey. He was the Executive Officer of the School of Historical Studies at the Institute for Advanced Study (IAS) from 2023 to 2026. He was the inaugural Albert Gallatin Research Excellence Professor of the History of Science at New York University Gallatin, professor of history in the Faculty of Arts and Science at New York University, professor in the Division of Medical Bioethics at NYU Langone School of Medicine, faculty affiliate of the Engelberg Center on Innovation Law and Policy at NYU School of Law, and director of science and society at the College of Arts and Science at NYU. He was also the inaugural Dibner Family Professor of the History and Philosophy of Science and Technology at Polytechnic Institute of New York University from 2007 to 2012. The chair is named after Bern Dibner (1897–1988), an electrical engineer, industrialist, historian of science and technology and alumnus of Polytechnic Institute of Brooklyn.

He received his Ph.D. in the history and philosophy of science from Cambridge University in 1991. Before joining the faculty of New York University, he taught at Harvard, the University of Pennsylvania, and the University of Chicago. He has been a senior fellow of the Dibner Institute for the History of Science and Technology at MIT and the Max Planck Institute for the History of Science in Berlin, Germany.

He is the author of numerous articles on the history, philosophy, and sociology of science and technology, with a particular emphasis on the cultural history of nineteenth-century German physics. He has also authored two books, Harmonious Triads: Physicists, Musicians, and Instrument Makers in Nineteenth-Century Germany and Spectrum of Belief: Joseph von Fraunhofer and the Craft of Precision Optics, which won the Paul Bunge Prize of the German Chemical Society for the best work on the history of scientific instruments in 2005 and the Hans Sauer Prize for the best work on the history of inventors and inventions in 2007. Spectrum of Belief has been translated into German, Fraunhofers Spektren: Die Präzisionsoptik als Handwerkskunst. He has co-edited a collection of essays entitled Music, Sound, and the Laboratory, with the University of Chicago Press published in 2013. He is the editor of Perspectives on Science: Gene Patenting (MIT Press, 2015). And his monograph, The Genealogy of a Gene: Patents, HIV/AIDS, and Race, was published by MIT Press in 2015 (paperback 2017). He has just completed a book entitled Broadcasting Fidelity: German Radio and the Rise of Early Electronic Music (Princeton University Press, 2024), which explores the collaborations between physicists, electrical engineers, physiologists, and musicians that led to improving the fidelity of early German radio broadcasts during the 1920s and '30s and inventing an early electronic musical instrument, the trautonium.

He was elected member of the Erfurt Academy of Sciences in 2009, of the German National Academy of Sciences - Leopoldina (Halle) in December 2011, and as a corresponding member of the Académie Internationale d'Histoire des Science in 2012., Saxon Academy of Science and Humanities of Leipzig in 2026, and the American Philosophical Society in 2026. He has worked on issues of genetic privacy and the effects of intellectual property law and the patenting of human genes on research in molecular biology and served as an expert for the ACLU in their lawsuit against Myriad Genetics on the BRCA 1 and 2 gene patents. He has been the recipient of an Alexander-von-Humboldt Fellowship in 1999–2000, and in 2010 he received the Francis Bacon Prize in the History of Science and Technology from Caltech, where he was the Francis Bacon Visiting professor of History of Science and Technology in 2012. In 2014 he received the Reimar Lüst/Humboldt Prize of the Alexander von Humboldt Foundation and was named Bosch Public Policy Fellow of the American Academy in Berlin. He was a fellow at the Wissenschaftskolleg (Institute for Advanced Study) in Berlin for the academic year 2016–17. He was a member of the Board of Directors of the American Friends of the Alexander von Humboldt Foundation from 2019 to 2022. He was elected to acatech, the German Academy of Science and Engineering in 2023.
