= Alan Grant Ogilvie =

Scottish geographer (1887–1954)

Alan Grant Ogilvie OBE FRSE FRSGS (1887–10 February 1954) was a Scottish geographer after whom the University of Edinburgh's Ogilvie Chair in Human Geography is named. He was President of the Royal Scottish Geographical Society from 1946 to 1950 and President of the Institute of British Geographers from 1951 to 1952.

== Life ==
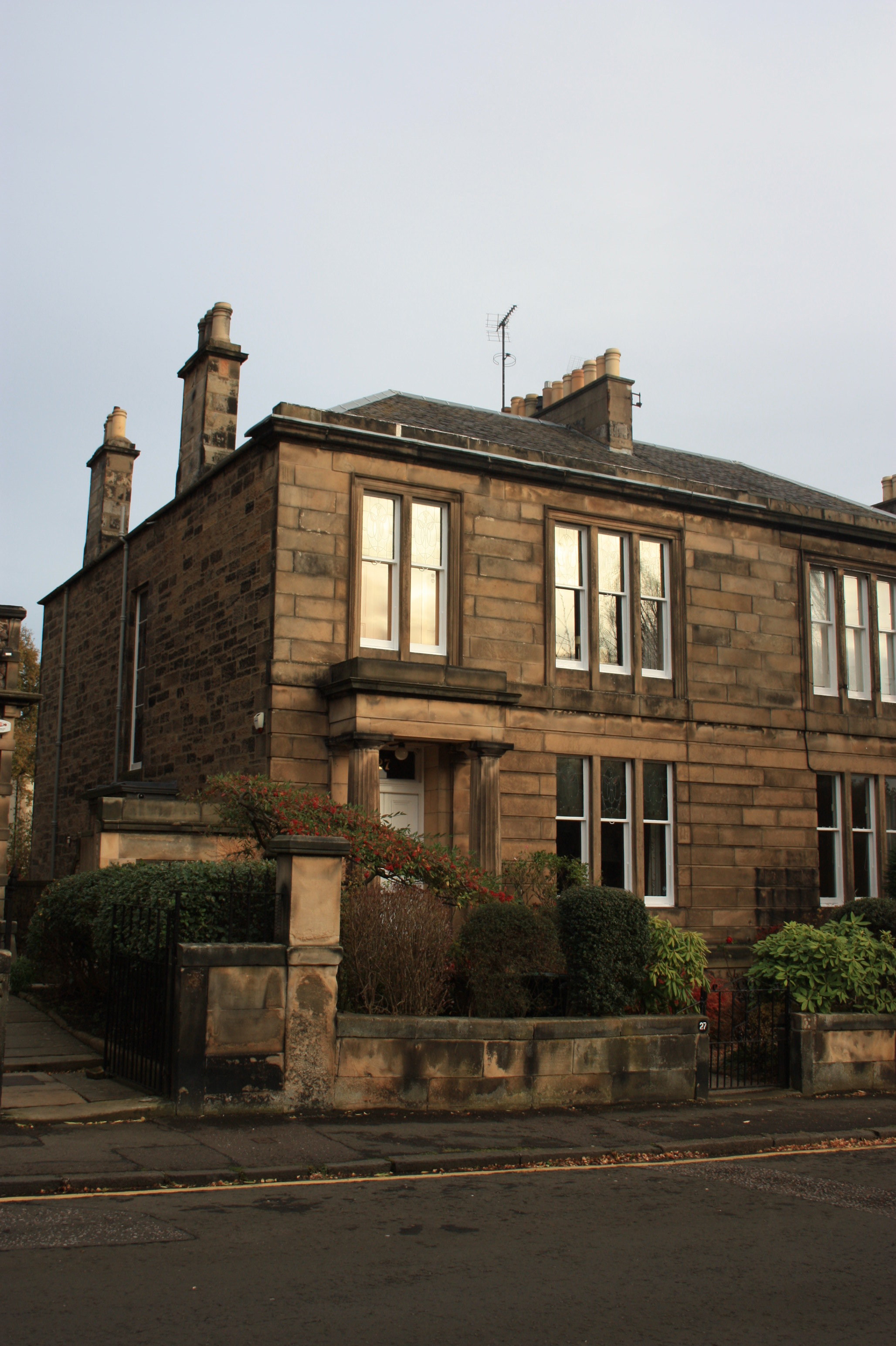
27 Blacket Place, Edinburgh

He was born in Edinburgh in 1887 the son of Sarah Ogston Gill and Francis Grant Ogilvie. They lived at 27 Blacket Place, Edinburgh.

He was educated at Westminster School in London as a boarder. He then went to the University of Oxford graduating with an MA in 1909. In 1912 he began working as a demonstrator in the geography department at the University.

In the First World War he served as a lieutenant in the Royal Field Artillery. In January 1917 he was seconded to the Royal Engineers to undertake accurate mapping of the Dardanelles and Macedonia.

After the war he became a Reader in Geography at the University of Manchester. In 1923 he returned to his home town as a lecturer at the University of Edinburgh having received a Professorship in 1931; one of the students he supervised at Edinburgh was Catherine Snodgrass. In 1924 he was elected a Fellow of the Royal Society of Edinburgh. His proposers were Sir Francis Grant Ogilvie (his father), John Walter Gregory, Francis Gibson Baily and John Horne.

He died in office on 10 February 1954. As a memorial the University named the Chair in Geography for him.

== Family ==
In 1919 he married Evelyn Decima Willes (died 1952).

== Publications ==
- Morocco and its Future (1912)
- Geography of the Central Andes (1922)
