= History of Aberdeen =

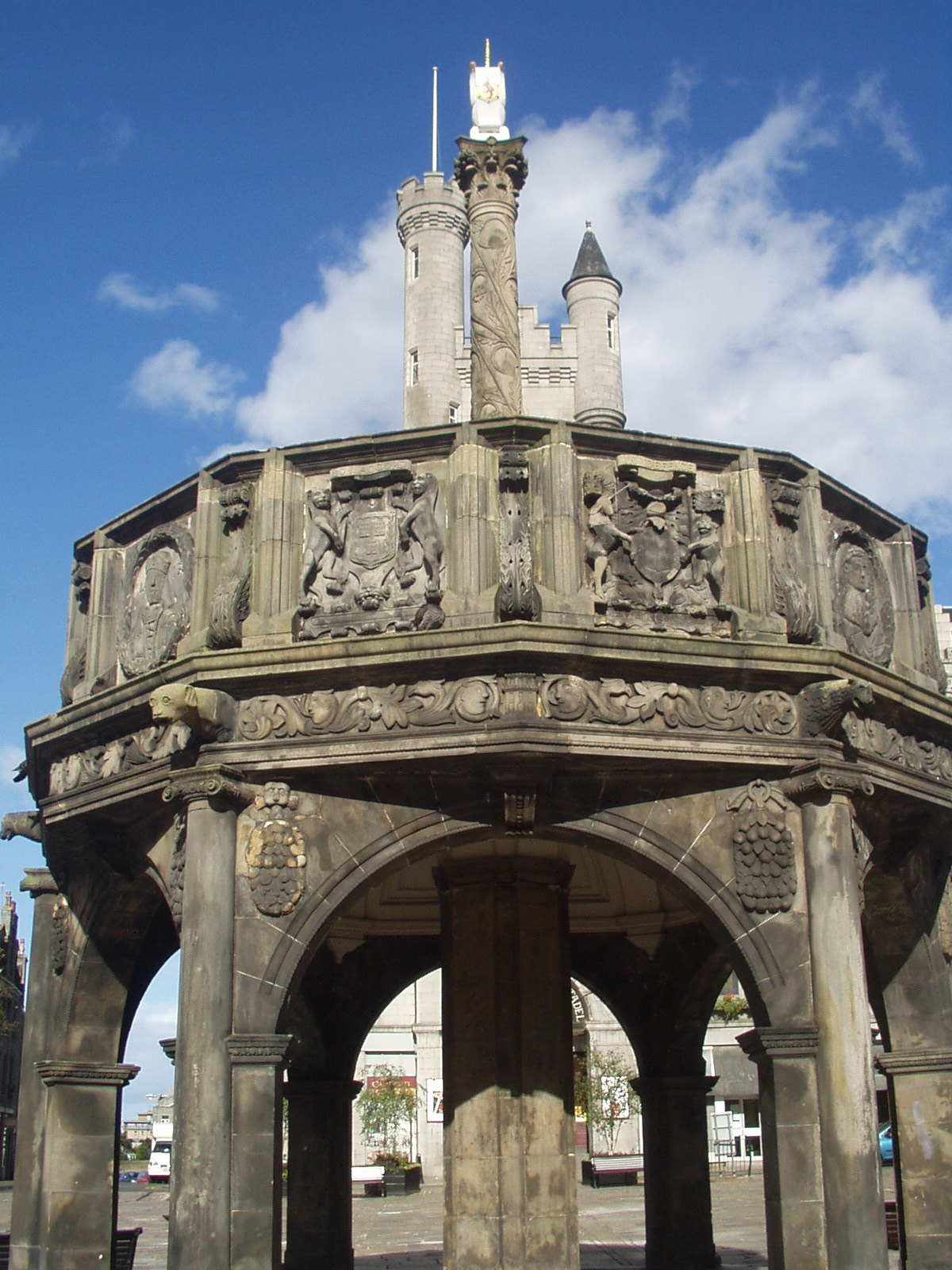
Aberdeen Market Cross

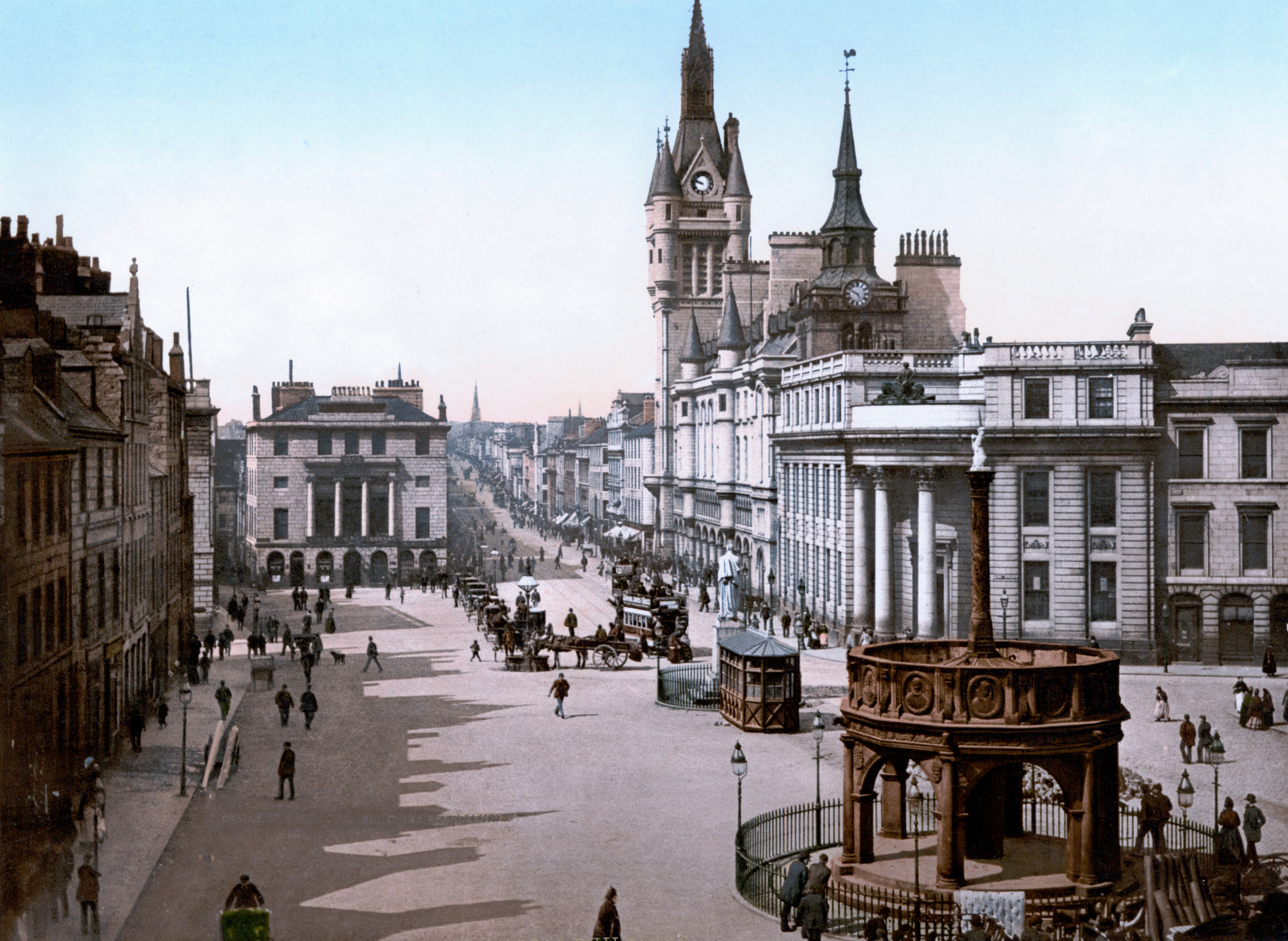
Aberdeen around 1900

There has been a human presence in the area of Aberdeen since the Stone Age. Aberdeen as a city, grew up as two separate burghs: Old Aberdeen, the university and cathedral settlement, at the mouth of the River Don; and New Aberdeen, a fishing and trading settlement where the Denburn entered the Dee estuary.

== Pre-1136 ==
Aberdeen was first settled by hunter-gatherers around 6000 BC, who established themselves around the mouths of the river Dee and river Don. Around 2000 BC the Beaker People, who built the mysterious stone circles that can be found in the Aberdeenshire area, arrived from the Rhine lands.

400 BC saw Celtic migration to the area from the north of Scotland.

The Romans arrived in Aberdeenshire in the first century AD. Agricola, the Roman governor of Britannia, led a force of some 40,000 men into Caledonia in 84 AD. They fought and defeated the united armies of the Picts in the Battle of Mons Graupius, near the peak of Bennachie in Aberdeenshire.

After the Romans left, the natives of Aberdeenshire began to convert to Christianity. Old Aberdeen's first church was built around 580. St Kentigern sent St Machar to convert the Picts to Christianity. St Machar's Cathedral today is named after him. It became the official seat of the Bishopric of Aberdeen.

== 1136 to the 18th century ==
In 1136, David I began the development of New Aberdeen north of the River Dee. Aberdeen's oldest surviving charter was granted by King William the Lion about 1179, confirming the corporate rights granted by David I, which gave trade privileges to the burgesses. The city received other royal charters later, particularly the Great Charter of 1319.

After the execution of William Wallace in 1305, his body was cut up and sent to different corners of the country to warn other dissenters. His left quarter ended up in Aberdeen and is buried in the walls of the cathedral.

In 1319, the Great Charter of Robert the Bruce transformed Aberdeen into a property owning and financially independent community. Bruce had a high regard for the citizens of Aberdeen who had sheltered him in his days of outlawry, helped him win the Battle of Barra and slew the English garrison at Aberdeen Castle. He granted Aberdeen with the nearby Forest of Stocket. The income from this land has formed the basis for the city's Common Good Fund, which is used to this day for the benefit of all Aberdonians.

Aberdeen's medieval council registers (then known as "common books") survive from 1398 onwards and are exceptional for their quantity and continuity among surviving Scottish burgh records. The earliest eight volumes, from 1398 to 1511, have been included in the UNESCO UK Memory of the World Register, and have been edited in a digital edition.

Old Aberdeen was burned by Edward III of England in 1336, but was soon rebuilt and extended. For many centuries the city was subject to attacks by the neighbouring lords, and was strongly fortified, but the gates were all removed by 1770. Royal charters from 1489 and 1498 created a free burgh to be administered by the church. In 1497 a blockhouse was built at the harbour mouth as a protection against the English. During the Wars of 1644-47 between the Royalists and Covenanters the city was impartially plundered by both sides. In 1644, it was taken and sacked by Royalist troops consisting of Irishmen and Highlanders after the Battle of Aberdeen. The sack of Aberdeen in 1644 by the Royalist general Montrose during the English Civil War involved uncharacteristic large-scale rape. 1647 saw the outbreak of bubonic plague, and a quarter of the population died. In 1715 the Earl Marischal proclaimed the Old Pretender at Aberdeen, and in 1745 the Duke of Cumberland resided for a short time in the city before attacking the Young Pretender.

== 18th and 19th centuries ==
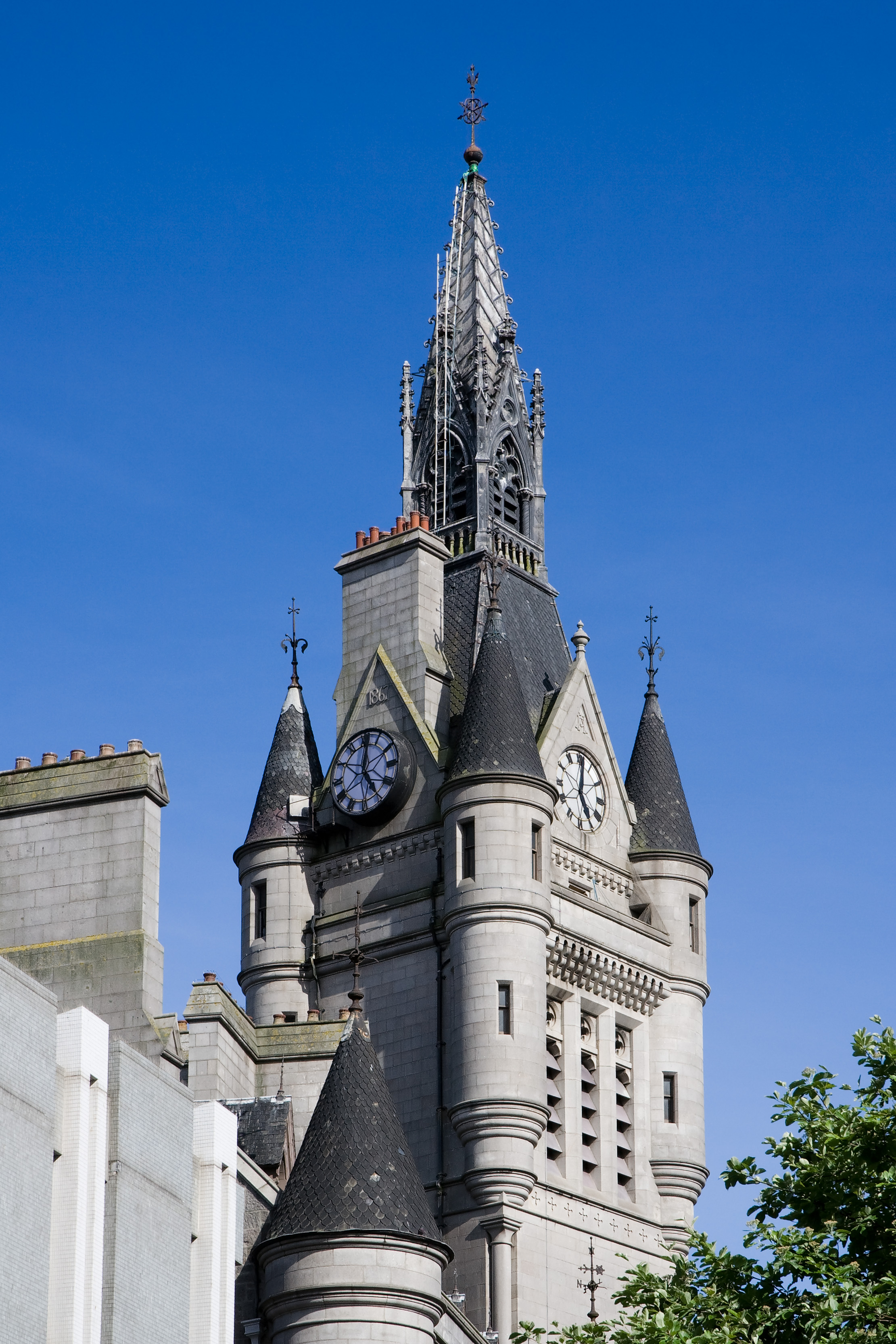
The tower of the Aberdeen Town House

The 18th century saw the beginnings of social services for the Infirmary at Woolmanhill which was opened in 1742 and the Lunatic Asylum in 1779.

In the late 18th century, the council embarked on a scheme of road improvements, and by 1805 George Street, King Street and Union Street were open, the latter a feat of extraordinary engineering skill involving the partial levelling of St Catherine's Hill and the building of arches to carry the street over Putachieside. The Denburn Valley was crossed by Union Street with a single span arch of 130 ft (40 m). Along these new streets was built the nucleus of the Granite City, many of whose buildings were designed by John Smith and Archibald Simpson.

The 19th century was a time of considerable expansion. The increasing economic importance of Aberdeen and the development of the shipbuilding and fishing industries brought a need for improved harbour facilities. During this century much of the harbour as it exists today was built: Thomas Telford's extension to the North Pier in 1810–1815, Victoria Dock (completed 1848), and the South Breakwater. Such an expensive building programme had repercussions, and in 1817 the city was in a state of bankruptcy. However, a recovery was made in the general prosperity which followed the Napoleonic Wars. Improvements in street lighting came in 1824 with the advent of gas, and a vast improvement was made to the water supply in 1830 when water was pumped from the Dee to a reservoir in Union Place. An underground sewerage system was begun in 1865 to replace the open sewers which previously ran along certain streets.

The city was the headquarters of the Great North of Scotland Railway, located at 89 Guild Street, which was formed in 1846, becoming one of the constituents of the London and North Eastern Railway in 1923. The city was formerly served by Aberdeen Corporation Tramways, which closed in 1958.

The Guild Street drill hall was completed in 1860.

The Aberdeen United Trades Council was established in 1868, and soon became a prominent force in the city, sponsoring candidates for the council and campaigning for shorter working hours.

Aberdeen Town House was completed in 1874 and the city was first incorporated in 1891.

In 1899 the city was separated for administrative purposes from the county of Aberdeenshire, and became a "county of a city".

== 20th century ==
By 1921 the population was 158,969.

George VI visited in 1925 to inaugurate the Memorial Court attached to Aberdeen Art Gallery.

In 1943 during World War II, a Luftwaffe raid dropped 129 bombs on Aberdeen resulting in 125 deaths and considerable damage to the city. This event is referred to as the Aberdeen Blitz.

In 1964 a food poisoning outbreak occurred, this was due to the sale of contaminated meat from a shop (William Low) which was on Union Street. The disease was typhoid. After the food poisoning outbreak the food shop closed and in the late 1980s. The name of the report of the government enquiry is the "Milne Report".

In 1930 Aberdeen's status as a county of a city was confirmed by the Local Government (Scotland) Act 1929. In 1975, counties of cities were abolished. The area of the former county of a city was then combined with nearby rural and suburban areas of Aberdeenshire and Kincardineshire to form a district in the new Grampian Region, and a separate lieutenancy area, known as the City of Aberdeen. When districts and regions were abolished in 1996 the former district became a unitary council area, known as Aberdeen City.

Today, although Old Aberdeen still has a separate charter and history, it and New Aberdeen are no longer truly distinct. The area of the city now includes the former burghs of Old Aberdeen, New Aberdeen, Woodside and the Royal Burgh of Torry to the south of the Dee.

== See also ==
- Aberdeen typhoid outbreak 1964
- Etymology of Aberdeen
- History of Aberdeen F.C.
