= Catherine Snodgrass =

Scottish geographer

Catherine Park Snodgrass was a Scottish geographer who spent much of her career as a lecturer at the University of Edinburgh.

== Biography ==
Snodgrass was born in Bonnyrigg, in Midlothian, in July 1917, on a farm; her parents came from farming families. After attending Esbank Girls' School, George Watson's Ladies' College, and St George's School, Edinburgh, she studied mathematics and natural history at the University of Edinburgh, and gained her MA in 1924. The following year she received her teaching credentials from St George's Training College, and then taught math and geography at Edinburgh's St Oran's School while continuing her education, including for the two-year diploma in geography under Alan Grant Ogilvie. She won a variety of honors and medals as a student and early in her career, including the Silver Medal from the Royal Scottish Geographical Society in 1925, and Carnegie Research Scholarships in 1929-1931 and in 1935. She finished her PhD in 1931 and was appointed temporary assistant lecturer that same year. She became a full lecturer in 1945. In the 1940s she worked on the Third Statistical Account of Scotland. She took early retirement in 1957, and in ill health gave up her position as editor of the Scottish Geographical Magazine in 1967. She died on 13 December 1974.

=== Teaching and academics ===
Snodgrass was "thorough, exacting and most devoting"; students had to combine proper fact-based scholarship with an insight into the social context of the subject, and treat social matters with "care, sympathy and understanding". Her doctoral work was grounded in her family's farming background. In the 1930s and 40s she worked on land use planning, as did many geographers in wartime England, working with the Land Utilisation Survey of Britain.
