= George Buchanan (engineer, born 1790) =

Scottish civil engineer and land surveyor

- Born: c. 1790; Montrose
- Died: 30 October 1852
- Education: University of Edinburgh
- Spouse: Charlotte Barnard (sister-in-law of Michael Faraday)
- Engineering career
- Discipline: civil
- Institutions: President of the Royal Scottish Society of Arts; Fellow of the Royal Society of Edinburgh

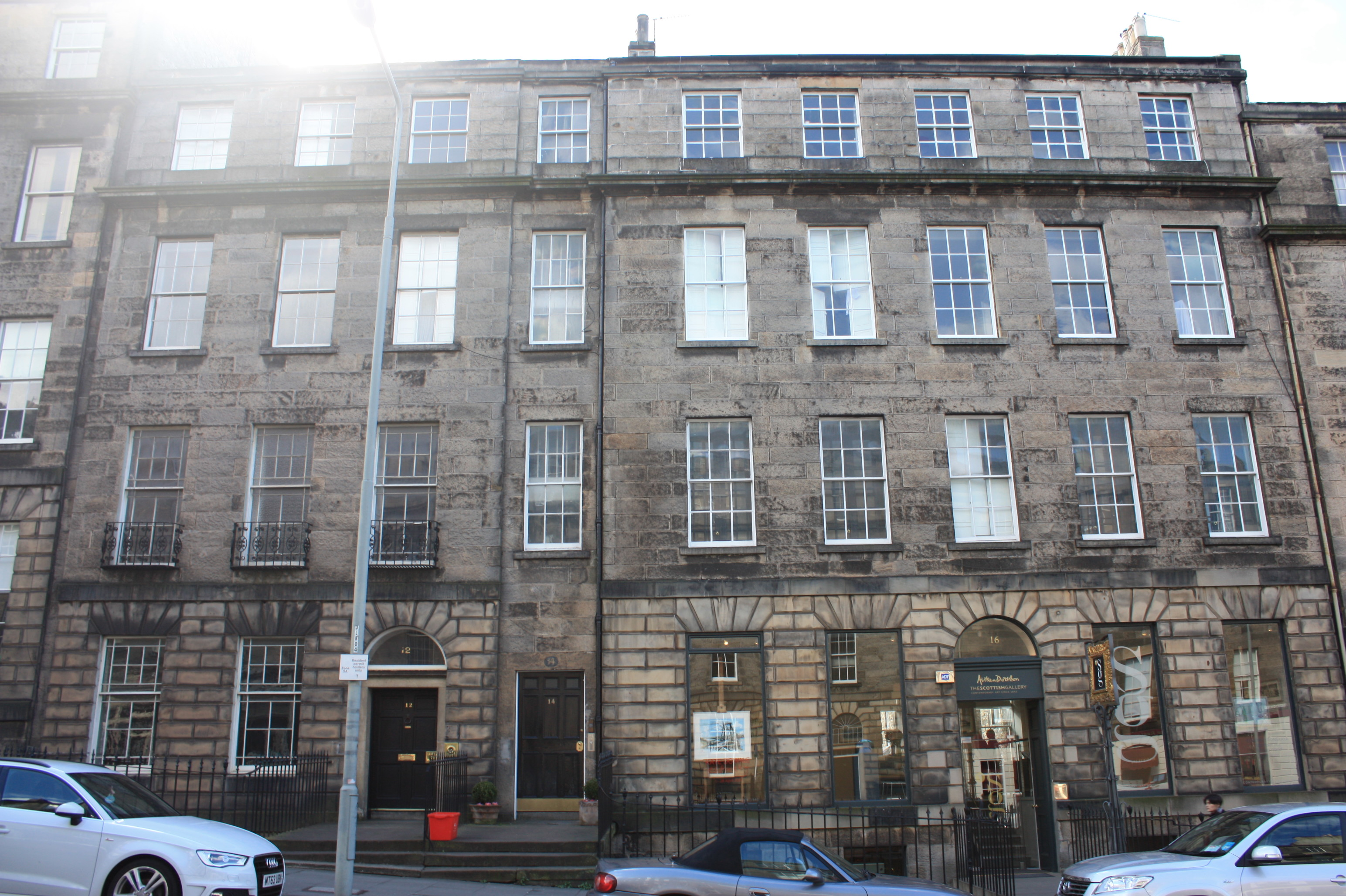
14 Dundas Street, Edinburgh, where Buchanan had a flat

George Buchanan FRSE FRSSA (c. 1790, Montrose – 30 October 1852) was a Scottish civil engineer and land surveyor who worked primarily on bridges and harbours. He supervised the construction of the Scotland Street tunnel and the Granton to Edinburgh tunnel.

== Life ==
Buchanan was third son of David Buchanan (1745-1812), a printer and publisher at Montrose, and was born about 1790. His father was a Glasite and an accomplished classical scholar, who published numerous edition of the Latin classics, which were in high repute for the accuracy.

He was educated at the University of Edinburgh where he was a favourite pupil of Sir John Leslie. About 1812, he began business as a land surveyor, however his inclination toward scientific topics soon led him to devote himself to the profession of a civil engineer. In this capacity, he was engaged in several public works of importance, in construction of harbours an bridges, and made a considerable local reputation.

In 1822, on the invitation of the directors of the School of Arts, he delivered a course of lectures on mechanical philosophy in the Freemasons' Hall, remarkable for the original and striking experiments. Buchanan afterwards gave one or two courses of lectures on natural philosophy, but his increasing business as an engineer interfered with any further educational work.

In 1827, he drew up a report on the South Esk estuary at Montrose in relation to a question then in dispute concerning salmon fishing. This report attracted the attention and gained the marked commendation of Lord-justice-clerk Charles Hope, Lord Granton, then solicitor-general, who afterwards, as long as he remained at the bar, always gave the advice in any case involving scientific evidence to 'secure Buchanan.' Subsequently, in all the important salmon-fishing questions which arose, and which embraced nearly every estuary in Scotland, Buchanan's services were enlisted, the point be generally to determine where the river ended and the sea began. He was considered a legal authority on salmon fishing disputes.

When the tunnel of the Edinburgh and Granton railway was being constructed under the New Town, and the adjacent buildings were considered in imminent danger, Buchanan was commissioned by the Sheriff of Edinburgh to supervise the works on behalf of the city. In 1848, he began the work of erecting the tall chimney, nearly 400 feet (120 m) in height, of the Edinburgh Gasworks, and carried cut a series of experiments to assure its stability. He communicated an account of this work in detail in two papers read before the Royal Scottish Society of Arts. Buchanan was the author of several scientific treatises. He published a 'Report on the Theory and Application of Leslie's Photometer'. He communicated a series of papers in 1851 to the Edinburgh Courant newspaper on pendulum experiments relating to the Earth's rotation, and was a regular contributor to the 'Transactions of the Royal Scottish Society of Arts.' He also contributed the article on 'furnaces' to the eighth edition of the Encyclopædia Britannica.

He was a fellow of the Royal Society of Edinburgh, and was elected president of the Royal Scottish Society of Arts for the session 1647–48.

In the 1830s he was living at 14 Dundas Street in Edinburgh's New Town.

In 1833 he was elected a Fellow of the Royal Society of Edinburgh, being proposed by Robert Stevenson. In 1847 he was elected President of the Royal Scottish Society of Arts.

He died of lung disease on 30 Oct. 1852.

== Family ==
David Buchanan (1779-1848), and William Buchanan (1781-1863) were his elder brothers.

He married Charlotte Barnard, sister of Sarah Barnard, the wife of Michael Faraday.
