= Alison Morrison-Low =

Dr Alison Morrison-Low is a retired Principal Curator for Science at National Museums Scotland.

== Background ==
Morrison-Low is a director for the Brisbane Observatory Trust and has been a director for the Northern Lighthouse Heritage Trust, the British Society For The History Of Science and the Museum of Scottish Lighthouses.

In July 2016 she was an invited expert on for "The Invention of Photography", In Our Time, BBC Radio 4. She won the Saltire Society Research Book Prize in 2005 for "Weights and Measures in Scotland: A European Perspective", and in 2008 the Hans R. Jenemann Foundation's Paul Bunge Prize in 2008 for "Making Scientific Instruments in the Industrial Revolution".

In 2018 Morrison-Low became the first female president of the Royal Scottish Society of the Arts.

== Selected publications ==
- Stevenson, Sara; Morrison-Low, A D (2015), Scottish photography : the first thirty years, National Museums Scotland, ISBN 9781905267972
- Morrison-Low, Alison D; Scotland, National Museums (2015), Photography - a Victorian sensation, Edinburgh NMS Enterprises Limited - Publishing, ISBN 978-1905267958
- Morrison-Low, A D (2012), From earth-bound to satellite : telescopes, skills and networks, History of science and medicine library, vol. 23.; Scientific instruments and collections, vol. 2., Brill, ISBN 978-9004211506
- Morrison-Low, Alison D (2007), Making scientific instruments in the industrial Revolution, Science, Technology and Culture, 1700-1945, Ashgate, cop, ISBN 978-0754657583
- Connor, R D; Simpson, A D C; Morrison-Low, A D; Scotland, National Museums of (2004), Weights and measures in Scotland : a European perspective, National Museums of Scotland, ISBN 9781901663884
- Stevenson, Sara; Morrison-Low, A D (1995), Light from the dark room : a celebration of Scottish photography, a Scottish-Canadian collaboration, National Galleries of Scotland, ISBN 9780903598583
- Burnett, John E; Morrison-Low, Alison D; Anderson, R G W; Mollan, R Charles (1989), "Vulgar and mechanick" : the scientific instrument trade in Ireland, 1650-1921, Royal Dublin Society Historical Studies in Irish Science and Technology, vol. 8, National Museums of Scotland, ISBN 9780860270263
