= Bogside, North Lanarkshire =

Coordinates: 55.764479°N 3.865578°W

Bogside
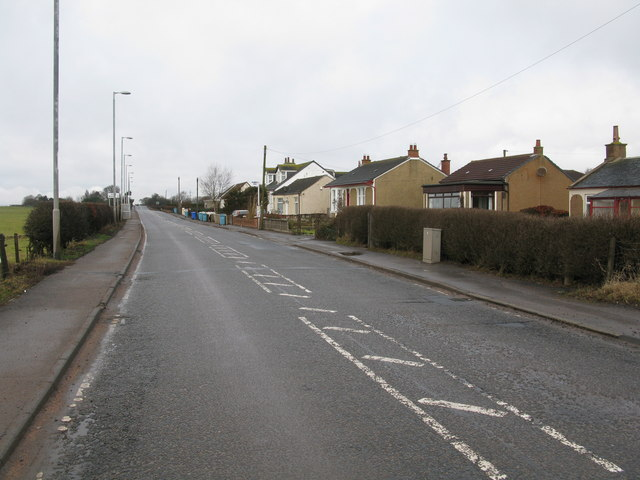

- Location within North Lanarkshire
- OS grid reference: NS829539
- Council area: North Lanarkshire
- Lieutenancy area: Lanarkshire
- Country: Scotland
- Sovereign state: United Kingdom
- Post town: WISHAW
- Postcode district: ML2
- Dialling code: 01698
- Police: Scotland
- Fire: Scottish
- Ambulance: Scottish
- UK Parliament: Motherwell and Wishaw
- Scottish Parliament: Motherwell and Wishaw

Bogside is a hamlet two miles north-east of Wishaw in North Lanarkshire, Scotland, on the border of South Lanarkshire.

The hamlet is situated on two main roads, A73 and A721, so many of Central Scotland's communities can be accessed from there. It contains only a few houses and a motorstore.

== Notable people ==
- Daniel Rankin Steuart lived at 11 Melville Crescent in Edinburgh's West End.
