= Frederick Hallard =

Frederick Hallard FRSE PRSSA (11 May 1821 – 12 January 1882) was a Scottish advocate and legal author. He served as senior Sheriff-Substitute for Midlothian 1855 to 1882 and was director of the Edinburgh Philosophical Institution and president of the Royal Scottish Society of Arts.

== Life ==
He was born in Edinburgh on 11 May 1821 the son of Nicholas Michael Hallard, a French teacher, living on Minto Street in Edinburgh's south side. His father had previously been a soldier in the French Revolutionary War but had emigrated to Britain along with other Royalist refugees during the period of persecutions, and found his way to Edinburgh. Aged four he was returned to his father's native town of Avranches in Normandy to begin his education (which is father should be under the French system now the wars were over). His later education was in Paris before returning to Edinburgh in 1837.

He then studied law at the University of Edinburgh and passed the Scottish Bar as an advocate in 1844. In 1865-66 he served as president of the Royal Scottish Society of Arts. He was also a member of the Speculative Society of Edinburgh. His address at this time was 7 Whitehouse Terrace.

In 1867 he was elected a Fellow of the Royal Society of Edinburgh his proposer being Edward Sang.

He died at home 61 York Place, Edinburgh on 12 January 1882.

== Publications and Other Works of Note ==
Hallard served as a Reporter on The Jurist newspaper 1844–1855

- Thoughts on Some Points in our System of Judicial Procedure (1858)
- A Proposal to Facilitate the Abolition of Feudal Conveyancing (1860)
- The Inferior Judge in Scotland (1869)
- Journal of Frederick Hallard 1845-1855 (held by the Bodleian Library in Oxford University

== Family ==
He was married to Mary Carr Robertson.
