= Daniel Rankin Steuart =

Scottish industrial chemist

Daniel Rankin Steuart FRSE FIC FCS (10 March 1848 – 1 August 1925) was a 19th/20th century Scottish industrial chemist.

== Life ==
He was born in Bogside, North Lanarkshire on 10 March 1848, the son of Sarah Whitehead (1805-1888), and her husband the elderly Alexander Steuart (1789-1865).

He studied chemistry at the University of Edinburgh under Prof Alexander Crum Brown. He then undertook postgraduate studies in Glasgow and Munich before joining the Oakbank Oil Works under George Beilby. In 1877 he was appointed Chief Chemist of the newly created Broxburn Oil Company.

In 1916 he was elected a Fellow of the Royal Society of Edinburgh. His proposers were John Horne, Leonard Dobbin, Robert Kidston, and John Smith Flett. He lived at 11 Melville Crescent in Edinburgh's West End.

He retired in 1920 and died at 20 Hillview, Blackhall, Edinburgh on 1 August 1925.

== Family ==
In 1883 he married Margaret Osborne (d.1907). They had four sons and two daughters. Their son Alexander Steuart became a famous clock-maker. Their youngest son 2nd Lt James William Harvie Steuart served in the Royal Scots during the First World War and was severely wounded in the Battle of Arras in April 1917, eventually dying of his wounds on 12 May 1920. He is buried in Ecclesmachan Cemetery.

== Publications ==
- Bygone Days (1936)
