= Otto Sibum =

German historian of science

Heinz Otto Sibum (29 March 1956) is a German historian of science, Hans Rausing Professor and Director of the Office for History of Science at the University of Uppsala.

== Biography ==
H. Otto Sibum holds a doctoral degree in physics (Dr.rer.nat.) from Oldenburg University (1989) and his habilitation in history from the TU Braunschweig (2001). He has been Director of Research at the Max Planck Institute for History of Science in Berlin (1998 – 2007) as well as Research Associate at the Department of History and Philosophy of Science at Cambridge University (1991-1995). He was awarded best teacher at British Universities for his teaching of history of science at Cambridge University (1992) and has received various scholarly awards like the Paul-Bunge-Prize (1994) for the best publication in history of science, as well as the scientific excellence grant from the Max Planck Society, Germany (1998). He was a visiting researcher and professor at various institutions: Cambridge University, Tel Aviv University, Professeur invité (directeur de recherche) at the École des Hautes Études en Sciences Sociales, Paris (2008), visiting professor at the Max Planck Institute for History of Science (2008, 2009, 2010) and at Si-Mian Center for Advanced Studies in the Humanities at East China Normal University, Shanghai (2010).

== Research ==
Otto Sibum’s research covers the history of the physical sciences from the 18th century until present. His studies are dedicated to exploring new approaches in social and cultural history of the sciences. He has recently worked on laboratory practices, instruments and the historical experiment in research.

== Selected publications ==
- Ed, The Heavens on Earth. Observatories and Astronomy in Nineteenth-Century Science and Culture (co-editors David Aubin and Charlotte Bigg), Duke University Press 2010
- ”Historians and the Study of Material Culture”, AHR Conversation with L. Auslander, Amy Bentley, H. Leor, H. O. Sibum, C. Witmore, The American Historical Review, vol. 114, no. 5, 2009, 1355-1404.
- Ed, Science and the Changing Senses of Reality circa 1900, Special volume of Studies in History and Philosophy of Science, 39 (3) Amsterdam: Elsevier, 2008, 295 - 458
- Changing Tastes: How Things Tasted in the Early Modern Period and How They Taste Now, with Steven Shapin, Uppsala Universitet, 2011.
- “From the Library to the Laboratory and Back Again: Experiment as a Tool for Historians of Science”, with Fors, H., Principe, L., Ambix, 63(2): 85-97, 2016.
