= Hugh Bryan Nisbet =

Scottish chemist

Professor Hugh Bryan Nisbet CBE FRIC FRSE

Principal and Vice-Chancellor of Heriot-Watt University
- In office 1966–1967

Principal of Heriot-Watt College
- In office 1950–1966

Professor of Chemistry, Heriot-Watt College
- In office 1946–1950

Personal details
- Born: Edinburgh, Scotland
- Died: 21 November 1969 (aged 67) Edinburgh, Scotland
- Occupation: Chemist, university administrator

Hugh Bryan Nisbet (31 March 1902 – 21 November 1969) was a Scottish chemist who served as the first Principal of Heriot-Watt University. He had a specialist knowledge of petroleum.

== Life ==
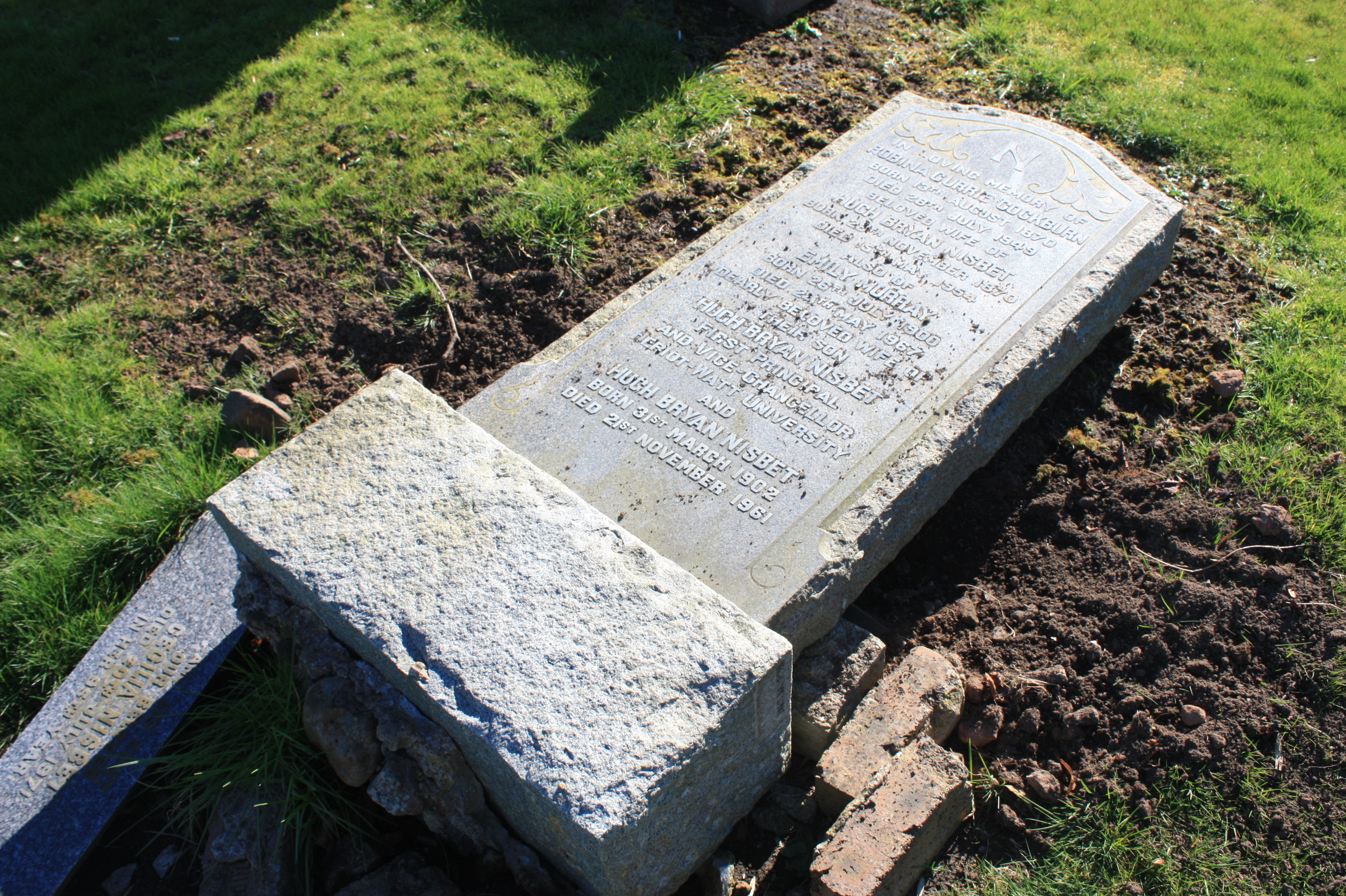
The grave of Hugh Bryan Nisbet, Morningside Cemetery, Edinburgh

He was born in Edinburgh on 31 March 1902 the son of Robina Currie (née Cockburn, 1870-1949) and Hugh Bryan Nisbet (1870-1954), a clerk. The family lived at 3 Maurice Place, off Blackford Avenue, in south Edinburgh. He attended George Heriot's School then studied science at the University of Edinburgh graduating with a BSc, and continuing as a postgraduate to gain his first doctorate (PhD).

In 1921 he began as a Demonstrator in Chemistry at Heriot-Watt College. He was elected a Fellow of the Royal Institute of Chemistry in 1926.

He was elected a Fellow of the Royal Society of Edinburgh in 1940. His proposers were Thomas Slater Price, James Cameron Smail, James Pickering Kendall, William Ogilvy Kermack and James Sandilands. He served as Vice President to the Society 1955 to 1958.

In 1950 he became Principal of Heriot Watt College and when it received university status in 1966 he became its first Principal and Vice Chancellor. He was made a Commander of the Order of the British Empire (CBE) in the New Years Honours list of 1963.

He died at home in Edinburgh on 21 November 1969. He is buried with his parents in Morningside Cemetery, Edinburgh. The grave is toppled and lies in the south-west section. A memorial service was held in his memory in Greyfriars Kirk.

== Family ==
In 1929 he was married to Emily Murray Donmall (1900-1967). Following her death, in 1968 he married Flora Pellow (née Bigsby) (1908-1998).

== Artistic recognition ==
His portrait by Alan Sutherland is held by Heriot-Watt University.
