= Aberdeen Corporation Tramways =

Tram system in Aberdeen, Scotland

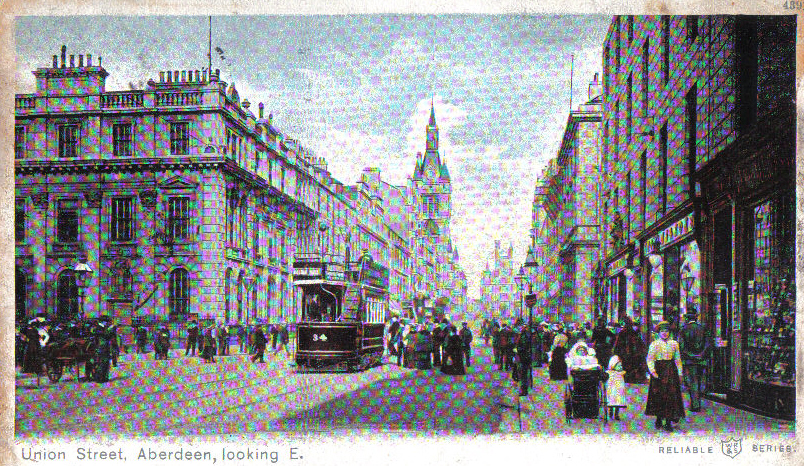
- Tram 34 on Union Street, Aberdeen ca. 1900

Operation
- Locale: Aberdeen
- Open: 27 August 1898
- Close: 3 May 1958
- Status: Closed
- Owner: Aberdeen City Council

Infrastructure
- Track gauge: 1,435 mm (4 ft 8 1/2 in)
- Propulsion system: Electric

Statistics
- Route length: 16.12 miles (25.94 km)

Aberdeen Corporation Tramways formerly served the City of Aberdeen, Scotland.

== The system ==
The city's tram system was the most northerly municipal tramway in the United Kingdom. It started on 26 August 1898 when the Aberdeen Corporation purchased the assets of Aberdeen District Tramways. The council paid the purchase price of £84,735 (equivalent to £9,520,000 in 2025), representing £15 per share, and they also took over the temporary loans amounting to £10,000 (equivalent to £1,120,000 in 2025)and the mortgages of £9,050 (equivalent to £1,020,000 in 2025).

From 1906 to 1918 the system fell under the care of R. S. Pilcher who served as general manager and chief engineer.

The system was electrified, with trams using the standard trolley poles until 1935 when bow collectors were fitted to take power from the overhead wires. The trams were double deck and painted in a dark green and cream livery, often with the words "Corporation Transport" painted prominently on the sides.

In the late 1930s the city purchased 18 trams from Nottingham Corporation Tramways, which closed in 1936. Further secondhand trams were later obtained from Manchester. The last new trams for the city were built by R Y Pickering of Wishaw in 1949.

The city's best known service was route 1, from Bridge of Don to Bridge of Dee, the numbering of which is preserved by the current number 1 bus service serving the same areas. The city's last tram operated on 3 May 1958, being replaced by diesel buses.

A short stretch of track that served as a terminus for the Sea Beach route remains alongside the Beach Boulevard where, following their final day in service, the entire fleet was burned. This remainder formerly ran right across to the former Constitution Street depot (now Aberdeen Science Centre), however the western end is now occupied by a hotel.

== Routes ==
No.	From	To	Via	Notes
1	Bridge of Dee	Bridge of Don	Union Street	Known as "The Bridges"
2	Castle Street	Mannofield	Great Western Road	Withdrawn 2 March 1951.
3	Castle Street	Castle Street	Union Street, Queen's Cross, Fountainhill Road, Rosemount Place, Rosemount Viaduct, Union Terrace	Circular Route
4	Castle Street	Hazlehead	Queen's Road	Subsequently operated by buses. Withdrawn in 1986 following bus deregulation.
5	Castle Street	King's Gate	Union Terrace	
6	Castle Street	Castle Street	Union Terrace, Rosemount Viaduct, Rosemount Place, Fountainhill Road, Queen's Cross, Union Street	Circular Route
7	St Nicholas Street	Woodside, Scatterburn	George Street, Great Northern Road	
9	Castle Street	Sea Beach	Constitution Street	
	Castle Street	Fonthill Road	Crown Street	Included a branch via Whinhill Road that terminated at Duthie Park. Withdrawn on 30 May 1931 and replaced with the number 6 bus.

The tram system was supported by 14 bus routes numbered No. 4, No. 8 and No. 11 through to No. 22, No. 4 being an extension of the No. 4 tram route.

== Business ==
The table shows the annual mileages run, passengers carried and revenue taken on tram car services.

Year	Tramcar Mileage	Passengers	Revenue
1899-1900		7,364,731	£30,781
1900-01	688,611	8,361,711	£35,452
1901-02	794,641	9,099,715	£37,931
1902-03	966,859	12,152,774	£50,936
1903-04	1,379,723	15,538,167	£64,071
1904-05	1,617,525	17,142,896	£70,430
1905-06	1,520,229	17,222,967	£70,507
1906-07	1,529,682	17,676,008	£72,605
1907-08	1,566,119	17,517,304	£71,930
1908-09	1,553,978	17,608,695	£71,679
1909-10	1,585,137	17,508,636	£71,121
1910-11	1,585,137	17,152,548	£73,470
1911-12	1,643,247	19,054,847	£73,470
1912-13	1,738,966	19,990,711	£80,166
1913-14	1,832,587	20,966,394	£85,266
1914-15	1,909,009	24,048.816	£88,002
1915-16	1,963,615	26,593,730	£94,328
1916-17	2,003,245	27,141,275	£100,068
1917-18	2,169,667	32,739,528	£116,378
1918-19	2,214,484	40,019,565	£140,895
1919-20	2,437,811	44,988,484	£169,737
1920-21			£191,470
1921-22			£183,995
1922-23	2,392,918	39,885,812	£184,750
1923-24	2,434,898	40,072,746	£183,521
1924-25	2,675,785		£189,246
1925-26	2,792,572	40,471,662	£177,568
1926-27	2,564,718		£143,906
1927-28	2,702,548	39,557,263	£153,267
1928-29	2,807,796	41,584,677	£161,964
1929-30	2,892,538	42,968,627	£167,636
1930-31	2,858,639	41,700,576	£162,314
1931-32	2,528,090		£145,729
1932-33	2,528,090		£148,425
1933-34	2,593,165	38,256,224	£151,612
1934-35	2,660,295	37,831,049	£150,016
1935-36	2,707,511	38,750,234	£153,768
1936-37	2,708,803		£152,565
1937-38	2,747,003		£152,565
1938-39		41,358,062	£166,478
1939-40			£200,315

== Depots ==
By 1914, the company had 77 passenger cars with depot accommodation for 72, with 30 at Queen’s Cross, 17 at Woodside, 6 at Mannofield, 13 at Constitution Street and 6 at Market Street.

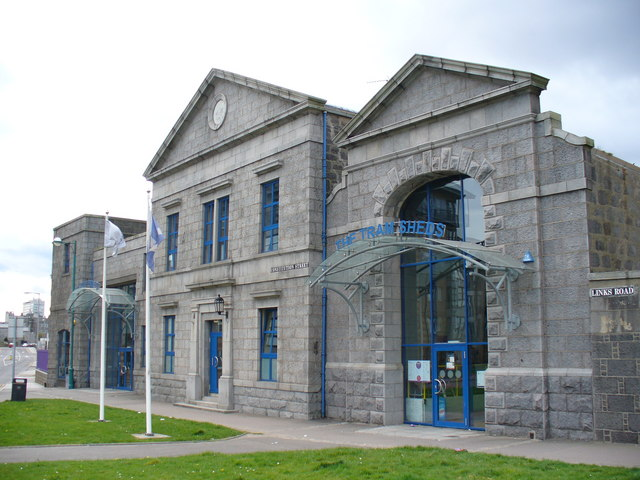
Former Constitution Street depot of 1885/1901

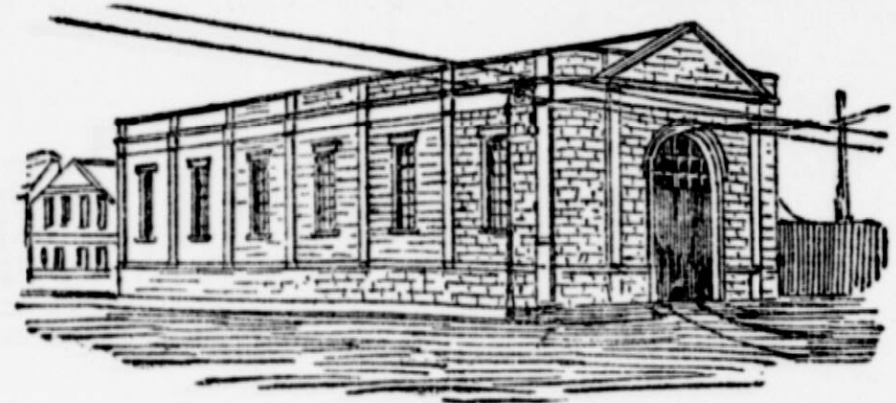
The Market Street depot of 1904

The depots and workshops were:

- Queen's Cross Depot (grid reference NJ 92362 05887). This depot was acquired from the Aberdeen District Tramways. In 1910 it was extended in size. It was extended again in 1951. The building was purchased by Grampian Television in 1960 and converted into their television studios and headquarters. In 2003 Grampian Television relocated their studios and offices to new premises; the former tram depot was subsequently demolished by 2004 with new flats built on the site.
- Woodside Depot (grid reference NJ 92779 08627). This depot was acquired from the Aberdeen District Tramways. Electrification of the depot took place during 1900. On closure this was eventually demolished and replaced with housing and a community centre.
- Mannofield Depot (grid reference NJ 91826 04535). This depot was acquired from the Aberdeen District Tramways. In 1901 the corporation agreed to it being rebuilt and equipped for electric tramcars. The tender for construction was won by Robert Beattie and Son of Holland Street. After closure it became William Wilson’s showrooms.
- Constitution Street Depot (grid reference NJ 94951 06915). Designed by Jenkins and Marr in 1885 as a public swimming baths. Converted to a tramway depot in 1901 for the sum of £45,000 (equivalent to £4,782,146 in 2025). Remodelled by the City Architects Department in 1920. This depot was put up for sale for £20,000 (equivalent to £475,400 in 2025) in 1954. Now the home of Aberdeen Science Centre.
- Market Street Depot (grid reference NJ 94596 05564). It was built from plans prepared by W. Dyack, C.E. burgh surveyor, and constructed by Alexander Cheyne, Holburn Street in Grey Rubislaw granite with picked dressings of Corennie red granite. The walls were finished with rustic ashlar. It was 114 feet (35 m) in length and 40 feet (12 m) in width. It was opened in autumn 1904 and is now a Category B listed building. After closure the site was redeveloped in 1997-98 incorporating the tram car shed as a large business office facility.
- Central Depot, King Street (grid reference NJ 94236 07404) Category C listed. A new central depot was required by 1914 and following a report to the Tramways Committee by W. Dyack, burgh surveyor, and R.S. Pilcher, tramway manager, the company decided to acquire the King Street Barracks site which was 2½ acres in area and develop an additional central depot at a total estimated cost of £26,000 (equivalent to £2,593,900 in 2025). This scheme required the conversion of the site and building two new car sheds and workshops etc. The plan was to accommodate 22 tramcars and 6 motor omnibuses in a shed 275 feet (84 m) by 45 feet (14 m) alongside the buildings facing St Peter Street with three separate lines of tramway. To anticipate future requirements, provision was made for an extension to the shed for housing an additional 24 cars.
- Crown Street workshops and depot (grid reference NJ 94028 05394). A building of 1903-04 comprising workshops, tram car depot, and electricity works and offices. Category C listed. The generating station opened in March 1903 and the tram depot in 1904.

== Officials ==
=== General Managers ===
- Robert Stuart Pilcher 1906 - 1919 (formerly traffic manager for Burton upon Trent Corporation Tramways, afterwards general manager of Edinburgh Corporation Transport Department)
- William Forbes 1919 - 1929 (assistant manager at Aberdeen from 1909, afterwards manager of the Cardiff Corporation Tramways)
- James Lowe Gunn 1929 - 1934 (formerly general manager of the Greenock and Port Glasgow Tramway, afterwards general manager of Nottingham Corporation Tramways)
- Alfred A. Smith 1934 - 1952
- Frederick Y. Frazer 1953 - 1963

=== Traffic Superintendents ===
- David Moonie 1898 - 1905 (from Aberdeen District Tramways)
- James D. Caird 1905 - 1908 (afterwards superintendent of the Halifax Corporation Tramways)
- Walter P. Young 1908 - 1912 (afterwards traffic superintendent of the Oldham Tramways)
- William Forbes 1912 - 1918 (afterwards general manager)
- Robert McLeod 1918 - 1919
- Charles Symon 1927 - 1834
- M.R. Shepherd 1934 - 1951
- Alexander Main from 1951

== Successors ==
Following the closure of the tram system, Aberdeen Corporation continued to operate buses. Following the Local Government (Scotland) Act 1973, the fleet passed to the new Grampian Regional Council in 1975, becoming Grampian Regional Transport. The dark green and cream livery was retained. Following the Transport Act 1985 the company was subsequently privatised, becoming the GRT Group, which later became FirstGroup. As of 2009, buses in Aberdeen are operated by First Aberdeen.

There were proposals for a new tramway system in 2013, but they were rejected in September 2014.

== See also ==
- History of Aberdeen
- National Tramway Museum
- Scottish Tramway and Transport Society
- Aberdeen Suburban Tramways
