= John Shank More =

Scottish lawyer and professor (1784–1861)

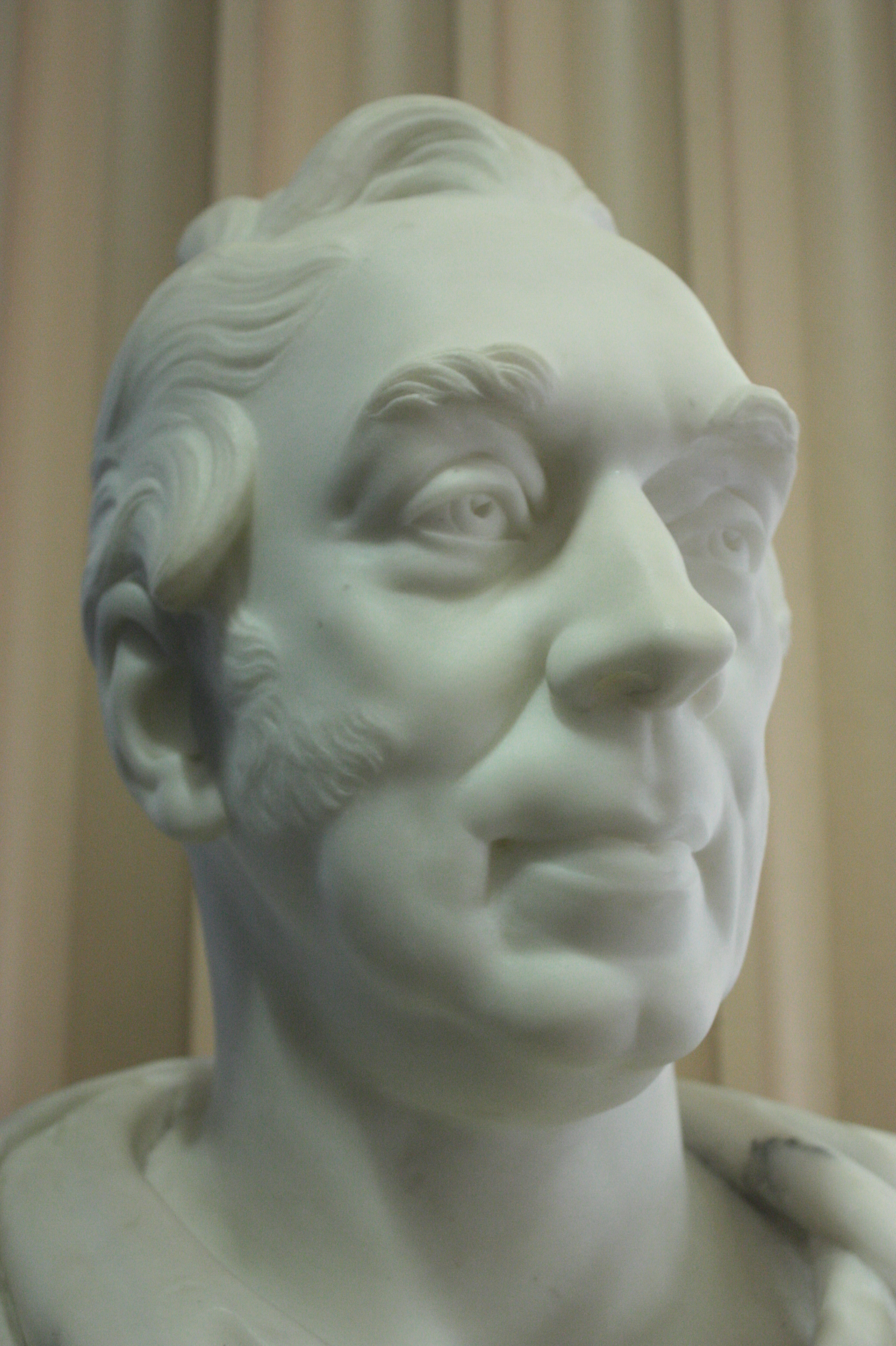
Bust of John Schank More, by J B Jones 1849, Old College, University of Edinburgh

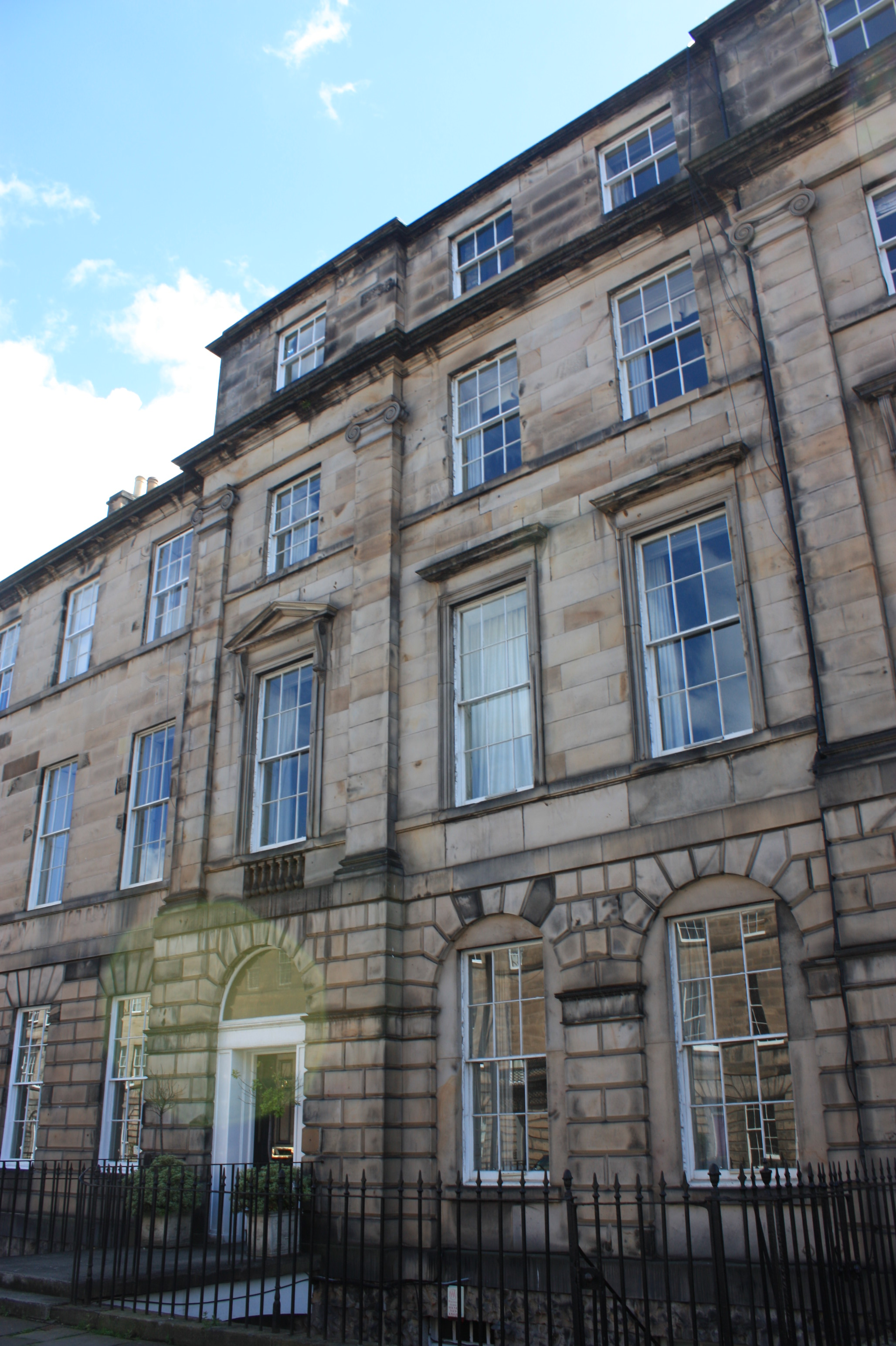
John Shank More's house, 19 Great King Street, Edinburgh

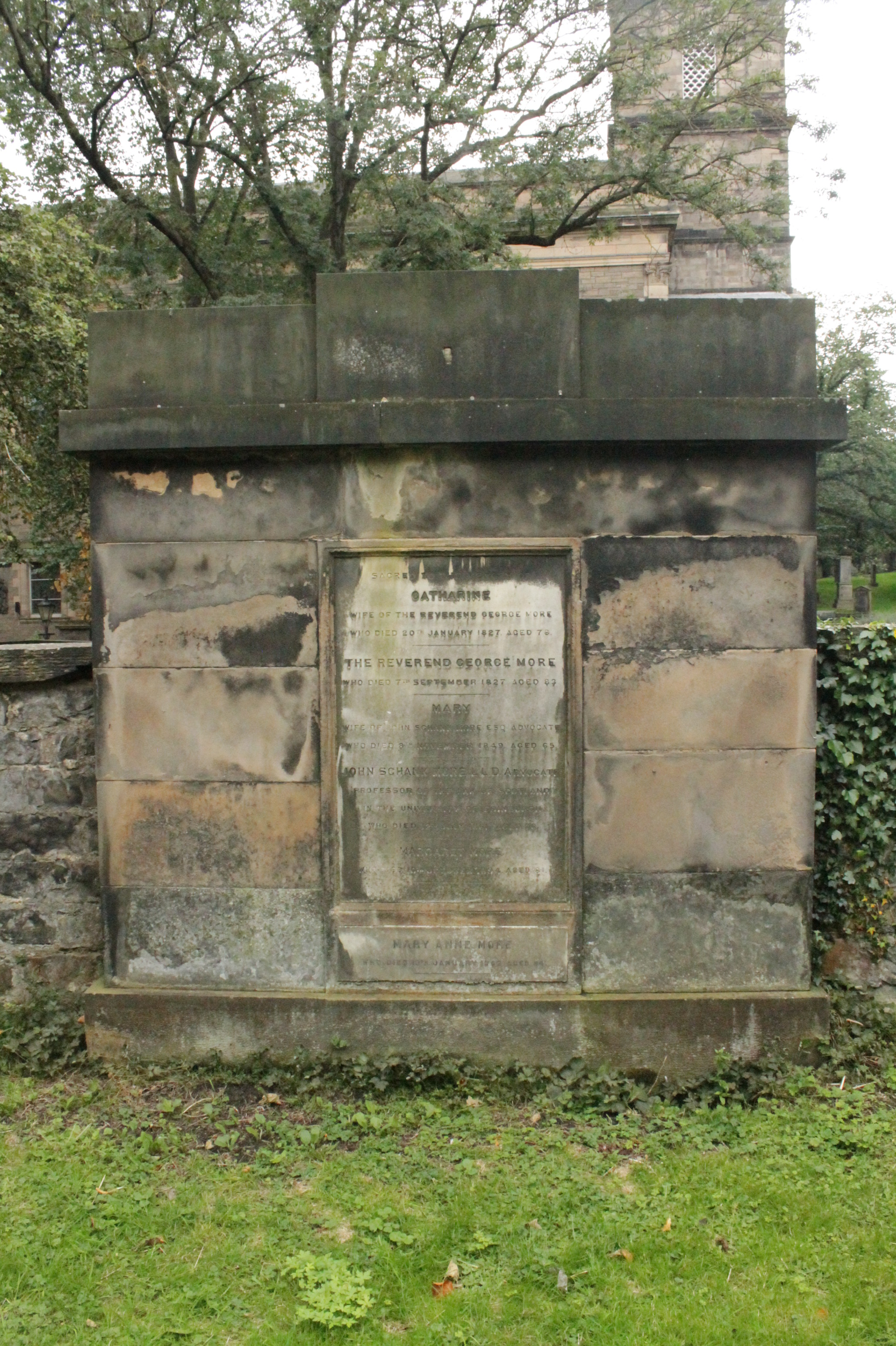
The grave of John Shank More, St John's churchyard, Edinburgh

John Shank More (sometimes written as John Schank More) LL.D FRSE RSA (1784–1861) held the Chair as Professor of Scots Law at the University of Edinburgh from 1843 to 1861. He was involved in the anti-slavery movement and was vice-president of the Royal Scottish Society of Arts.

== Life ==
More was born in North Shields in County Durham, the son of Reverend George More (1744-1827), for some time Presbyterian minister at South Shields, and his wife Catharine (1749-1827). His parents retired to Edinburgh around 1805, living at 82 Nicolson Street. His parents later moved to 4 Hill Square.

He was called to the Bar in 1806.

He married Mary Gillespie (1784-1849) in 1811. They initially lived near his parents at 32 Nicolson Street. In the 1820s he was living at 19 Great King Street.

He edited John Erskine's Principles and Stair's Institutions. He was considered "a suitably learned man who inspired some affection in his students despite the dullness of his lecturing style".

He was involved in the sudden departure of Karl Pearson's father from the University of Edinburgh.

In 1820 he was elected a Fellow of the Royal Society of Edinburgh. His proposers were Thomas Thomson, Sir David Brewster and James Bonar.

In the 1830s he is listed as living at 19 Great King Street, in a Georgian townhouse in Edinburgh's New Town.

He was President of the Royal Scottish Society of the Arts 1844–45.

== Death ==
He died at home 19 Great King Street in Edinburgh on 12 July 1861 and is buried in his parents' grave in the churchyard of St John's Episcopal Churchyard at the west end of Princes Street. The grave lies on the lower terrace just west of the main stair. His wife Mary is buried with him, as is his daughter Margaret (1813-1894).

== Description ==
He is described as follows:

".... dear old modest Professor More, who never looked at the class, but glanced up at the end of every utterance to the upper left-hand corner of the class room, said in most sober tone:

“And so” (head up) “as the sun can never set on the British Dominions” (head up) “so that sun can never rise upon a British slave.”

The worthy gentleman blushed as he looked for the last time at the corner, when for once the room resounded with a round of applause, possibly ironical to some extent, but kindly as well.

There is one story connected with his name which may bear repetition.

A junior counsel had been asked for his opinion on the memorial of a client. He wrote below it:

“Your case does not seem to me to have a leg to stand upon. Perhaps it would be as well to take in the assistance of one Shank More.”

It is also told of him that his good nature led him on the occasion of an examination, when in answer to his question the student had said, “Yes” firmly, he gently responded: “Right, but rather ‘no’.”

, p. 234

== Bibliography ==
- Armour, H., & Wigham, J. (1851). To John Shank More, Professor of the Law of Scotland in the University of Edinburgh. H. Armour.
