= Aberdeen District Tramways =

Horse-drawn tramway services in Aberdeen

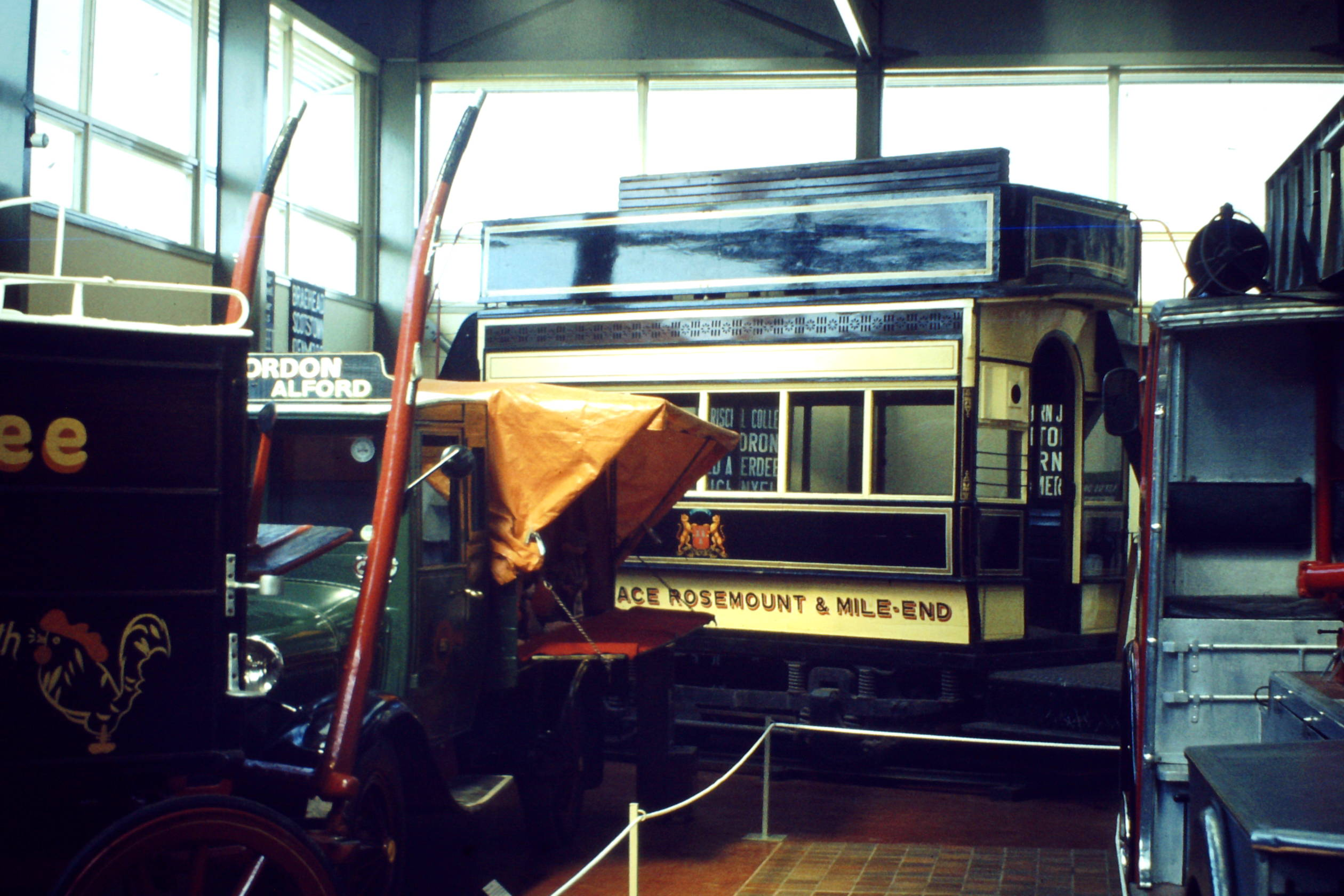
- Horse Car No 1. in the Grampian Transport Museum

Operation
- Locale: Aberdeen
- Open: 31 August 1874
- Close: 27 August 1898
- Status: Closed

Infrastructure
- Track gauge: 1,435 mm (4 ft 8 1/2 in)
- Propulsion system: Horse

Statistics
- Route length: 10.95 miles (17.62 km)

The Aberdeen District Tramways operated a horse-drawn tramway services in Aberdeen between 1874 and 1898.

== History ==
Aberdeen District Tramways Act 1872
- Act of Parliament
- Parliament of the United Kingdom
- Long title: An Act to authorise the construction of Tramways in certain parts of the City of Aberdeen and its suburbs; and for other purposes.
- Citation: 35 & 36 Vict. c. cxciv

Dates
- Royal assent: 10 August 1872

Other legislation
- Repealed by: Aberdeen Corporation (Water, Gas, Electricity and Transport) Order Confirmation Act 1937

Status: Repealed

Text of statute as originally enacted

The Aberdeen District Tramways Act 1872 (35 & 36 Vict. c. cxciv) received royal assent on 10 August 1872. However, the unsettled state of labour and iron markets delayed the start of construction until 6 April 1874. The engineer was Henry Gore of London who advised of the likely routes which would prove remunerative. The first routes constructed were from Queen's Cross via Union Street, St Nicholas St and George St to Kittybrewster, and by way of Union Street and King Street to the North Church. The estimated cost of this part of the undertaking was £11,000. The contractors for rail were E.T. Dill of Lombard Street, London, and for sleeper, Campbell & Co of Aberdeen. The paving works were undertaken by Murray, Urquhart & Co of Aberdeen. Initially there were six tramcars and a depot at Queen's Cross. The system was inspected by Mr. Willet CEng and opened on 31 August 1874.

The George Street line was extended to Kittybrewster station in 1876. An additional tramcar was obtained resulting in a total fleet of nine cars. The extension opened on 12 June 1876.

The tramway was extended to Mannofield, Woodside and King Street Market. These extensions opened on 1 September 1880.

An extension was built from Union Terrace to Queen's Cross via Rousemount, and the line in Union Street from King Street to Wellington Place was doubled. The company employed Mr Carter CEng of Edinburgh as the chief adviser and the work was carried out under the supervision of Mr. Proudfoot, the company's resident engineer. The line was formed from Queen's Cross junction to Rosemount Viaduct with steel girder rails 6 inches (15 cm) deep, and across the viaduct to the junction with Union Street with girder rails 7 inches (18 cm) deep. The space between the rails and for 18 inches (46 cm) either side were paved with granite setts, where formerly tarmacadam had been used. The works were completed in 20 weeks and the extension opened on 30 November 1888. Four new tramcars built by R & J Shinnie were purchased for the new service.

The tramway was extended at a cost of between £5,000 and £6,000 from Bloomfield to Bridge of Dee. After inspection by Major-General Charles Scrope Hutchinson R.E. this extension opened on 24 August 1894. This extension used 520 tons of rails which were delivered from Rotterdam by steamer. The purchase was consigned through Messrs Dick, Kerr & Co, of London

The company fleet grew to around 40 tramcars. Initial vehicles were obtained from the Starbuck Car and Wagon Company but from 1883 the company turned to a local manufacturer, R & J Shinnie of Union Row, Aberdeen, who provided subsequent tramcars.

David Moonie was the superintendent of the company from 1874 and continued when the company was taken over by Aberdeen Corporation Tramways until 1905

== Closure ==
Aberdeen Corporation took over the company on 26 August 1898 and formed the Aberdeen Corporation Tramways to continue the service and modernise it. The council paid the purchase price of £84,735, representing £15 per share, and they also took over the temporary loans amounting to £10,000 and the mortgages of £9,050.

Horse car number 1 survived and is restored in the Grampian Transport Museum.
