= Frederick Malloch Bruce =

Scottish electrical engineer and educationalist

Prof Frederick Malloch Bruce FRSE FPS FIEE (1912-1997) was a Scottish electrical engineer and educationalist. He developed electrode profiles described as Bruce profiles.

== Life ==
He was born in Aberdeen on 13 July 1912. He was educated in Aberdeen.

He studied Electrical Engineering at Kings College, Newcastle graduating BSc in 1933. He was then apprenticed to C. A. Parsons and Company in Tyneside.

In the Second World War he was in the Supply Armaments Research Department, working on small arms and aircraft weaponry.

In 1946 he moved to the Nelson High Power Laboratories in Stafford. In 1948 he returned to Scotland as Professor of Electrical Engineering at the Royal Technical College in Glasgow, under David Stirling Anderson.

In 1962 he was elected a Fellow of the Royal Society of Edinburgh. His proposers were Donald Pack, George Hibberd, Patrick Ritchie, and Ernest Geoffrey Cullwick.

He retired in 1972 due to ill-health and died peacefully in his sleep at Cranleigh in Surrey on 23 July 1997.

== Family ==
He was married to Frances.
