= Alexander Robert Horne =

Scottish engineer and author

Prof Alexander Robert Horne FRSE OBE MIME PRSSA (1881–1953) was a Scottish engineer and author.

== Life ==
He was born in Leven, Fife in 1881. He was educated at George Heriot's School in Edinburgh.

He was apprenticed as an engineer to James Milne & Sons Ltd of Milton House Works in the Canongate in Edinburgh probably around 1896. He then went t the University of London to formally train as an engineer.

In 1910 he obtained a post as Professor of Engineering at Robert Gordons College in Aberdeen, aged only 29. Here he lived at 374 Great Western Road in Aberdeen. In 1920 he was elected a Fellow of the Royal Society of Edinburgh. His proposers were Sir Thomas Hudson Beare, Richard Stanfield, George Adam Smith and John Taylor Ewen.

In 1929 he moved to Heriot Watt University as Professor of Mechanical Engineering and stayed there until retiral in 1945.

He died in Edinburgh on 17 May 1953.

== Positions of Note ==
- President of the Royal Scottish Society of Arts
- President of the Aberdeen Association of Civil Engineers

== Publications ==
- This Modern World and the Engineer (1934) co-written with Charles Galton Darwin
- The Age of Machinery
- The Story of the Orkney and Zetland Association 1896–1946

== Family ==
He was married to Nina Helena Horne. They had a son Edward A Horne.
