= Thomas Rowatt =

Scottish engineer

Thomas Rowatt (1879–1950) was a Scottish engineer who became Keeper then Director of the Royal Scottish Museum.

== Life ==
He was born in Kew on 7 November 1879 to Scottish parents. His grandfather Thomas Rowatt (d.1880) was involved with James Young in the Scottish shale oil industry.

His family moved to Scotland in his youth and he was educated at Ewart High School in Newton Stewart. He studied Engineering at the Wohler Schule in Frankfurt-on-Main and at Heriot-Watt College in Edinburgh. He served his apprenticeship at Carrick & Ritchie, crane builders, at the Waverley Engineering Works on Easter Road, Edinburgh.

In 1901 he became an assistant at the Royal Scottish Museum. In 1909 he was promoted to Assistant Keeper in the Technology Department. In 1921 he replaced Alexander Gait as Keeper of Technology and in 1934 succeeded Edwin Ward as Director of the Museum.

In the First World War he served with the Royal Engineers attached to the Royal Naval Division at Antwerp. Redeployed to Gallipoli in 1915 he won the Military Medal for bravery.

In 1935 he was elected a Fellow of the Royal Society of Edinburgh. His proposers were Percy H. Grimshaw, Alexander Stephen, Sir Thomas Hudson Beare and John Brown Clark.

He was President of the Watt Club 1937/8.

He retired in 1945 and died on 7 April 1950.
