= Aberdeen Suburban Tramways =

Tramway operator in Scotland

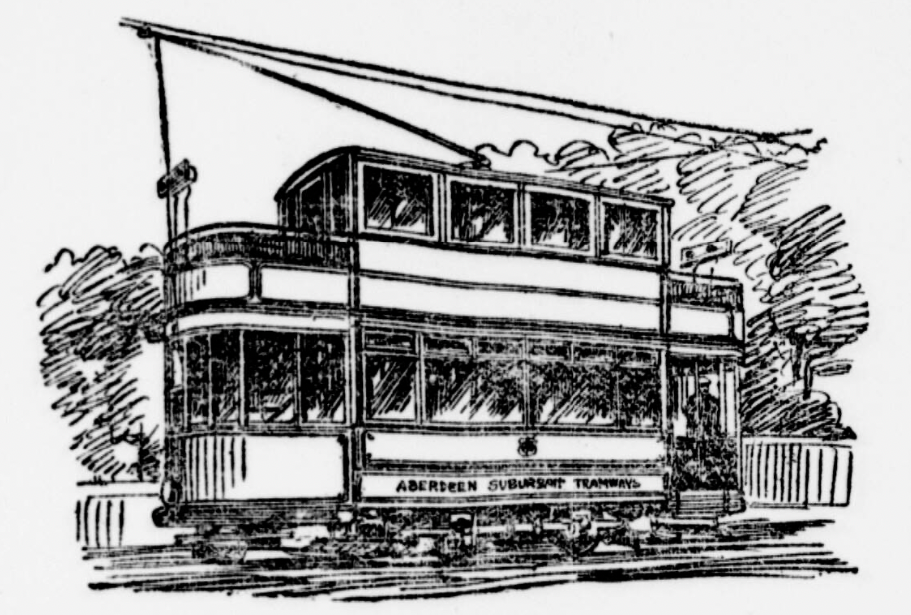
- From the Aberdeen Weekly Journal Wednesday 6 July 1904

Operation
- Locale: Aberdeen
- Open: 23 June 1904
- Close: 9 June 1927
- Status: Closed

Infrastructure
- Track gauge: 1,435 mm (4 ft 8 1/2 in)
- Propulsion system: Electric

Statistics
- Route length: 4.59 miles (7.39 km)

The Aberdeen Suburban Tramways operated two electric tramway services in Aberdeen between 1904 and 1927.

== History ==
The Aberdeen Suburban Tramways operated two separate tramway services in Aberdeen, which were essentially extensions from the terminus of Aberdeen Corporation Tramways routes.

The first was from the Great Western Road terminus to Bieldside church. This Deeside section opened for traffic on 23 June 1904. This section has cost £18,000 (equivalent to £1,892,300 in 2025) to construct.

The second was from the Great Northern Road terminus to Stoneywood church. This Donside section was inspected by Colonel Von Donop of the Board of Trade on 8 July 1904, and the line opened immediately afterwards.

An alarming accident took place on 30 October 1904. Due to the points outside the Mannofield depot being set incorrectly, a tramcar left the main line at speed and entered the shed, breaking through the heavy wooden door, before colliding with an empty car in the shed. The tramcar was crowded and a number of passengers were shaken by the experience. A lady and her daughter left the tramcar and fell into the pit in the shed, and were severely injured.

In 1914 the company acquired a new tramcar built by the United Electric Car Company Ltd.

In June 1914 the company approached the Corporation to see if there was interest in them acquiring the company. The corporation was initially enthusiastic. Negotiations continued through 1915 and the company faced a difficult future with falling profits caused by the war conditions and increase in taxation. Profits for the 6 months to 31 January 1915 had fallen to £1,153 from £1,484 for the same period 12 months previously. In 1916 the corporation considered a report commissioned from the manager of the Glasgow Tramways, Mr. Dalrymple. He valued the suburban tramways at £38,000 (equivalent to £2,857,800 in 2025) and noted that the price being asked by the company was £45,000 (equivalent to £3,384,300 in 2025). He expressed a view that the system was half-worn but it would certainly be an acquisition to the city as a better service could be provided by having the Suburban Tramways under the control of the Corporation. On account of the First World War and the difficulty in persuading the UK Government that they should be allowed to borrow the money required, the acquisition scheme was postponed.

In 1918 fares were increased by ½d per stage (equivalent to £0.10 in 2025).

In December 1920 the corporation were in dispute with the company about the company’s care in operating over the Corporation tramway lines. A subcommittee had met with the Suburban Tramway Company and failed to come to terms with them. The town clerk gave notice for the termination of the present arrangements in June 1921. The Ministry of Transport sent Mr. C.D. Stanley to Aberdeen to resolve the dispute. As well as the issues in relation to operating over the Corporation tramway lines, there was a dispute as to the payment to be made by the Council to the company in lieu of wages, the Council wanting to pay at the rate which the Company paid their employees instead of at their own higher rate. The Company declined to accept this, contending that they paid their employees a proper wage, according to their grade, and that any money left over went into general expenses. Fortunately a compromise was found and the notice to terminate was withdrawn by the Corporation.

In early 1922 the company reported a profit for the six months to 31 January 1922 of £1,050. Further negotiations with the Corporation for the sale of the business resumed in early 1923, but these were broken off by the Corporation. The company wanted £43,000 (equivalent to £2,112,600 in 2025) but the Corporation were only willing to offer £33,500 (equivalent to £1,645,800 in 2025). Profit for the 6 months to 31 January 1924 rose to £2,285 (equivalent to £112,262 in 2025) and in the half year to 31 July 1924 it was £1,858 (equivalent to £97,663 in 2025).

In 1925 the Aberdeen Corporation Tramways decided to sell two tramcars to the Suburban Tramways company. It was also decided to allow a post office letter-box to be placed on the last Bieldside car for the convenience of people in the district between Bieldside and Mannonfield, as it would provide for a later postal service than they currently enjoyed.

== Depots ==
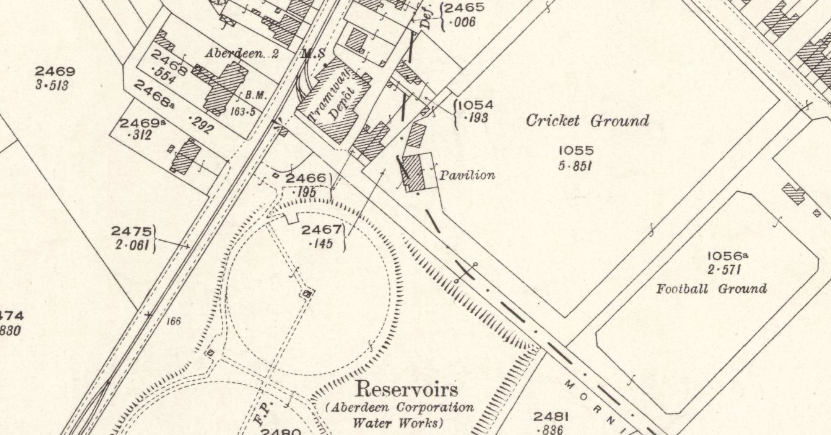
Mannofield depot on the OS 1:2,500 map of 1925

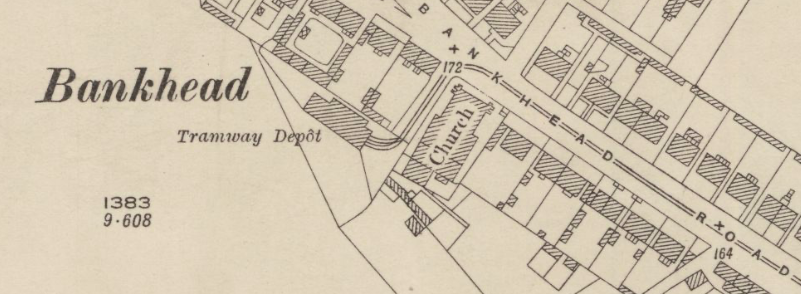
Bankhead depot on the OS 1:2,500 map of 1925

Depots were at Mannofield at the junction of St John's Terrace and Morningside Road (grid reference NJ 91664 04344) and Bankhead off Bankhead Avenue near Stoneywood Parish Church (grid reference NJ 89210 10208)

== Closure ==
In 1926 the company entered into negotiation with Aberdeen Corporation for the purchase of the tramway, but turned down an offer of £30,000. The running powers over the Corporation lines ceased on 8 June 1926.

In August 1927 it was announced that the company would be wound up. In September 1927 the assets of the company were put up for auction at the depts at Mannofield, Scatterburn and Bankhead, including 11 tramcars, one Ford Motor Lorry of 1921, tower wagons etc. The company also sold two 32-seater and one 27-seater Tilling-Stevens Charabancs of 1914, one 32-seater leyland saloon bus of 1922 and one 6-seater Renault touring car. The tramcars which cost between £700 and £1,000 when new were sold for between £16 and £7 each. The company had a fleet of 11 trams for these two services, from Brush Electrical Engineering Company and United Electric Car Company.

The services stopped running on 2 June 1927, a year after the corporation had terminated the through running arrangements.

== Remaining infrastructure ==
Car number 11 dating from 1914 was purchased in 1927 and converted to a summer house at The Firs, Kinharrachie, Ellon. It was rescued in 1984 and taken to the Grampian Transport Museum for restoration.

Part of the tracks still remain behind the takeaway at the bottom of Bankhead Avenue. And on the Bankhead Church opposite, is a tram rosette, used to hold up overhead in places where there were not poles. This tram rosette is in fact the most northerly in the United Kingdom.
