= Francis Grant Ogilvie =

Scottish educator, museum director and scientist

Sir Francis Grant Ogilvie CB FRSE

Principal of Heriot-Watt University
- In office 1886–1900
- Succeeded by: Arthur Pillans Laurie

Sir Francis Grant Ogilvie CB FRSE (8 August 1858 – 14 December 1930) was a Scottish educator, museum director, and scientist.

== Birth, parentage and early career ==
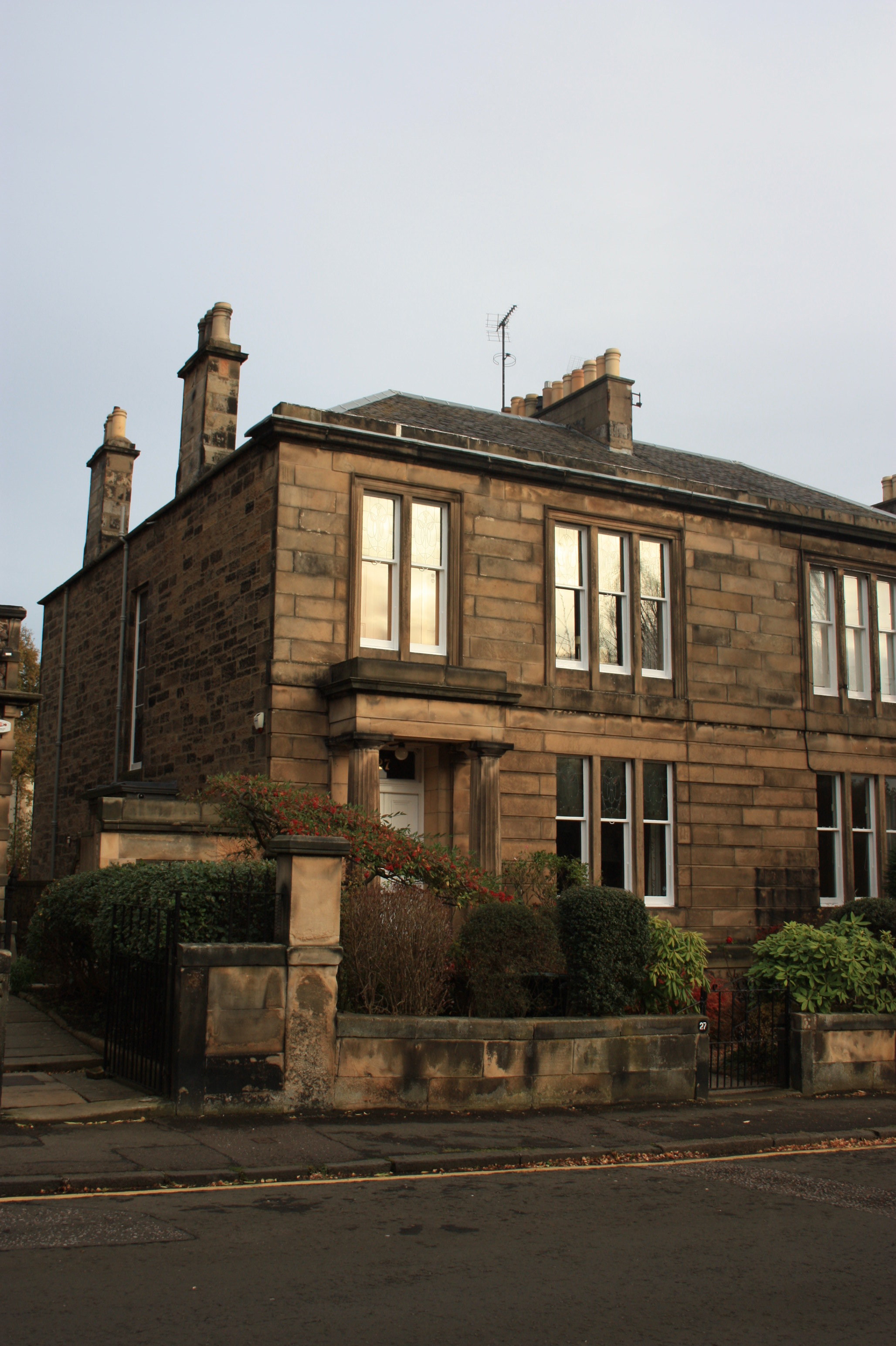
27 Blacket Place, Edinburgh

Ogilvie was born in Monymusk, Aberdeenshire, the eldest son of the Reverend Alexander Ogilvie, headmaster of Robert Gordon's College, Aberdeen, and his wife Maria Matilda (née Nicoll). His younger sister, Dame Maria Gordon, was an eminent scientist in the fields of geology and palaeontology.

He was educated at the Aberdeen Grammar School and University of Aberdeen (MA, 1879). After graduating, he "came to Edinburgh where in addition to Engineering he devoted much attention to Natural Science. He was a favourite pupil of Sir Archibald Geikie and a friend of Sir John Murray of Challenger fame, and throughout his life he was an ardent student of Physical Geology, and in particular of the relation of geology to scenery and the economic applications of geological investigations" (Proceedings of the Royal Society of Edinburgh).

He served as Assistant Professor of Natural Philosophy in the University of Aberdeen, 1880-1881, and lectured in applied mathematics and steam at the Mechanics Institute, Aberdeen, 1880-1882, graduating Bachelor of Science of the University of Edinburgh in 1881.

In May 1882, he was appointed science master at Gordon's College, Aberdeen, where he remained for four years before being appointed Principal of Heriot-Watt College in Edinburgh in May 1886. In addition, in 1887, he commenced work as Professor of Applied Physics at the college. Ogilvie's "work for the Heriot-Watt College gave a great stimulus to technological education, and many men [sic] who subsequently filled important posts were trained in that school. He knew most of his students personally, and in after life followed their careers with great interest" (Proceedings of the Royal Society of Edinburgh).

In 1888, he was elected a Fellow of the Royal Society of Edinburgh. His proposers were Sir John Murray, Alexander Buchan, George Chrystal and William Evand Hoyle.

He was married on 6 April 1886 to Sarah Ogston Gill, the daughter of Alexander Ogston Gill and his wife Barbara Smith Gill (née Marr). They lived at 27 Blacket Place in the south of Edinburgh, a large semi-detached Victorian villa.

== Later career ==
=== Museum director ===
In 1900, he was appointed director of the Edinburgh Museum of Science and Art. The museum passed under the Scottish Education Department in 1901, and Ogilvie, as director, became a member of the Department. From 1901 to 1903 he was president of the Royal Scottish Society of the Arts. In February 1903 he was transferred to London, to commence work as a Principal Assistant Secretary (Technology and Higher Education in Science and Art) under the United Kingdom's Board of Education.

=== Civil servant ===
In 1910, he was re-assigned by the president of the Board of Education to new duties as secretary of the board for the Science Museum, South Kensington, the Geological Museum and the Geological Survey, and in August 1911 was given additional responsibility as director of the Science Museum.

In 1920, he laid down his appointments under the Board of Education with the Science and Geological Museums, commencing work instead, in November 1920, as principal assistant secretary in the Department of Scientific and Industrial Research.

He finally retired from the Civil Service on pension in 1922.

He did, however, continue to serve as chairman of the Geological Survey Board from 1920 to 1930, as a member of the Senate of the University of London, from 1925 to 1929, and as president of the Museums Association in 1927-1928.

== Military career ==
Ogilvie joined the Volunteer Force, probably as a member of the Aberdeenshire Engineer Volunteers, in 1878. He was commissioned lieutenant in the 1st Aberdeenshire Engineer Volunteer Corps on 12 May 1883, before being appointed and promoted captain, to do duty with the Forth Division, Volunteer Submarine Miners - a unit which he raised and commanded for many years - with effect from 2 April 1887. He was promoted to major on 31 March 1888.

Awarded the Volunteer Long Service Medal in October 1900, he retired from the Volunteer Force shortly afterwards, on 1 November 1900.

Following the outbreak of First World War in 1914, Ogilvie was appointed as a scientific advisor to the Munitions Invention Department of the Ministry of Munitions. In 1916, however, he assumed duties as Assistant Controller in that ministry's Trench Warfare Research Department, being formally appointed to do duty as a temporary Major in the Army (graded for purposes of pay as an Assistant Director at the War Office), with effect from 1 July 1916. In 1917 he was re-deployed as Assistant Controller in the Chemical Warfare Department. He relinquished his Army commission on ceasing to be employed on military duties, and was granted the honorary rank of Major, with effect from 22 July 1918.

== Honours ==
He was elected as a Fellow of the Royal Society of Edinburgh on 16 January 1888, and served as President of the Royal Scottish Society of Arts, 1901-1903.

He was awarded a Doctor of Laws, honoris causa, from the University of Edinburgh in 1911.

He was appointed Companion of the Order of the Bath (CB) on 9 November 1906, and knighted in the 1920 New Year Honours.

== Death ==
On 13 December 1930, Ogilvie was travelling by train from London to Edinburgh to visit relatives, when he was taken suddenly ill. He died a few hours after arriving at his destination, on 14 December 1930.

His widow Sarah died, aged 87 years, on 17 February 1951, a fortnight after being knocked down by a van near her home in Edinburgh.

Their only son, Alan Grant Ogilvie, the first professor of geography at the University of Edinburgh, was born in Edinburgh in 1887.

== Assessment and characteristics ==
"Sir Francis Ogilvie [left] his mark on every one of the numerous official charges that were entrusted to him. Ardent, sincere, and painstaking, he had a very wide knowledge of men and affairs, and was a very prudent and sagacious counsellor, inclined to caution but never despondent or pessimistic. The high positions to which he attained showed how much his administrative ability was esteemed; and those who were brought into contact with him in the course of official work never failed to appreciate the breadth of his views, his mastery of detail, and his sympathy with all educational advances."

"Throughout his life [Ogilvie] was essentially an 'open-air' man, intensely fond of a tramp on the Braemar Hills or the woodlands of Surrey, and though his opportunities were limited, his geological studies continued till the close of his life; in fact he was engaged in mapping the Cretaceous rocks around Shere in Surrey, where he lived, during his years of retirement after active service in official posts. Although he has left few printed contributions to scientific literature, his influence on education and research was very great."

== Footnotes ==
Cultural offices
Preceded by William Isaac Last	Director of the Science Museum; 1911–1920	Succeeded by Colonel Sir Henry Lyons
