= Royal Scottish Society of Arts =

Learned society in Scotland

The Royal Scottish Society of Arts is a learned society in Scotland, dedicated to the study of science and technology. It was founded as The Society for the Encouragement of the Useful Arts in Scotland by Sir David Brewster in 1821 and dedicated to "the promotion of invention and enterprise". The Society was granted a Royal Charter in 1841.

== Background ==
For many years the promotion of invention and improvements of all sorts was the main business of the Society, and its meetings were the focus of a large and active cross-section of Edinburgh society – academics, gentry, professionals such as civil engineers and lawyers, and skilled craftsmen such as instrument makers, engravers and printers. The Society's published Transactions provide a record of changes in technology, and the Society's archive is held by the National Library of Scotland, and is a valuable resource to researchers.

In more recent times, the Society's meeting programme has been based on lectures given by expert and often distinguished speakers. The lectures cover a wide range of scientific and technical topics, and still with the original aim of keeping the membership informed about current concerns in science, engineering, medicine, and often with a topical edge.

Meetings of the Society are held in Edinburgh monthly, at 7pm on Monday evenings, from October or November to May or June. In addition, organised visits are made each year to a research, manufacturing or industrial establishment.

== Presidents of the Society ==
Presidents of the society have been:

- Duke of Buccleuch (1832–1836)
- Marquess of Tweeddale (1836–37)
- John Graham Dalyell (1837–40)
- Andrew Fyfe (1840–41)
- John Robison (1841–42)
- James L'Amy (1842–43)
- Thomas Stewart Traill (1843–44)
- John Shank More (1844–45)
- Sir George MacKenzie (1845–46)
- David Maclagan (1846–47)
- George Buchanan (1847–48)
- John Cay (1848–49)
- Thomas Grainger (1849–51)
- George Lees (1851–52)
- David Stevenson (1852–53)
- Rev P Holland (1853–54)
- David Rhind (1854–55)
- George Wilson (1855–57)
- Edward Sang (1857–58)
- Charles Piazzi Smyth (1858–59)
- Thomas Stevenson (1859–60)
- Alexander Bryson (1860–61)
- Patrick Newbigging (1861–62)
- Stevenson Macadam (1862–64)
- Charles Cowan (1864–65)
- Frederick Hallard (1865–66)
- George Robertson (1866–68)
- David Stevenson (1868–69)
- Robert William Thomson (1869–71)
- Thomas Ivory (1871–73)
- Prof Thomas Croxen Archer (1873–75)
- John Milne (1875–77)
- Dr Robert McNair Ferguson (1877–79)
- George Blanshard (1879–80)
- Henry Cadell (1880–82)
- Prof William Swan (1882–85)
- David Bruce Peebles (1885–87)
- Francis Brodie Imlach (1887–89)
- John H A MacDonald (1889–91)
- Alexander Leslie (1891–93)
- Dr William Taylor (1893–95)
- George Frederick Armstrong (1895–97)
- Andrew Beatson Bell (1897–99)
- William Ivison Macadam (1899–1901)
- Francis Grant Ogilvie(1901–03)
- Dawson Turner (1901–05)
- Thomas Hudson Beare (1905–1908)
- William Allan Carter (1908–11)
- William Graham Youll (1911–12)
- Col. Alex Ogilvie (1912–21)
- Richard Stanfield (1921–23)
- James Robert Milne FRSE (1923–25)
- Robert Stuart Pilcher (1925–27)
- W. A. Williams (1927–29)
- Edwin Seddon (1929–31)
- Henry Briggs (1931–34)
- Charles J. Cousland (1934–36)
- Alexander Robert Horne (1936–38)
- Alexander Steuart (1938–40)
- William G. Maxwell (1940–42)
- Robert Aitken (1942–44)
- George Herbert Liston-Foulis (1944–46)
- John T. Jeffrey (1946–48)
- Christopher Y. Johnson (1948–50)
- James Cameron Smail (1950–53)
- Robert Waldron Plenderleith (1953–56)
- Eric Openshaw Taylor (1956–58)
- James Wallace (1958–60)
- G. Struan Marshall (1960–63)
- John Lochore (1963–65)
- Norman G. Matthew (1965–68)
- Alistair G. Thomson (1968–71)
- J. Forbes Fowler (1971–74)
- John A.G. Copland (1974–77)
- Gordon R. Nicoll (1977–80)
- Malcolm W. Thomson (1980–83)
- Graeme H. Menzies (1983–86)
- Robert G. McLeod (1986–89)
- William P. Small (1989–93)
- Harry Ogden (1993–97)
- Allen D.C. Simpson (1997–2002)
- Stuart Monro (2002–05)
- Anthony Busuttil (2005–08)
- Robin Harper (2008–11)
- Ian Robson (2011–14)
- Stuart Monro (2015–16)
- Dr Alison Morrison-Low (2017–)

== Awards ==
The society awards the Makdougall Brisbane medal, founded by Sir Thomas Makdougall Brisbane. This award is not to be confused with the similarly named award given by the Royal Society of Edinburgh.

Recipients have included:

- 1865: Arthur Beverly, for his planimeter
- David Stevenson (1815–1886), civil engineer
- c. 1890: William Galt Black, for his wind gauge
- 1892: James Blyth, for his wind turbine
- 1910: David Thomas Gwynne-Vaughan
- c. 1923: Dawson Turner (1857–1928), pioneer radiologist and D.M.R. Crombie for their paper on An Investigation of the Ionised Atmosphere around Flames by means of an Electrified Pith Ball
- William Dyce Cay (1838–1925)
- 2016: Dr Alison Morrison-Low

== Arms ==
Coat of arms of Royal Scottish Society of Arts

Notes
Granted 11 May 1978
Crest
The head of the goddess Athena contournée helmeted Proper.
Torse
Sable and Or.
Escutcheon
Or between two eagle owls heads affrontée Proper a torch Sable paleways enflamed Gules on a chief Azure a saltire Argent all within a bordure Ermine.
Supporters
Dexter a scientist and sinister an artisan both in the habit of the early 19th century the former bearing in his dexter hand a balance and the latter in his sinister hand a perpendiculum.
Motto
Pro Scientia Et Arte
