= Francis Gibson Baily =

British electrical engineer

Francis Gibson Baily FRSE (1868–1945) was a British electrical engineer remembered for his research into electromagnetism. He was one of the first to suggest the use of water power to produce electricity and as such was the forefather of hydroelectricity. He emphasised the need to preserve natural beauty and also recognised the advantages of alternating current in generating schemes.

== Life ==
He was born in Paddington, London on 18 March 1868 the son of Walter Baily and his wife, Mary Ann Gibson. He was educated at University College School in London and the School of Mines in Clausthal in Germany and then won a place at Cambridge University to study Natural Science, graduating in 1889. He went to work in the new world of electricity, first at James Simpson & Co and then at Siemens in Germany (1890-1892).

In 1892 he returned to Britain to lecture at University College, Liverpool and in 1896 became Professor of Electrical Engineering at Heriot Watt College in Edinburgh.

In 1896 he was elected a Fellow of the Royal Society of Edinburgh. His proposers were Sir John Murray, George Chrystal, Alexander Crum Brown and Sir Francis Grant Ogilvie. He served as Vice President of the Society from 1929 to 1932.

In Edinburgh he lived at the newly built student residences at 11 Ramsay Gardens at the head of the Royal Mile.

In the First World War he served as a Captain in the Royal Engineers and was responsible for developing ultrasensitive microphones used during tunnelling.

He retired in 1933 and died in Juniper Green, south-west of Edinburgh, on 23 February 1945.

== Publications ==
- Hysteresis of Iron and Steel in a Rotating Magnetic Field (1894)
- The Distribution of Energy in Towns (1895)
- Trees and Shrubs for Housing Schemes and Roads (1938)
- The Development of Highland Water Power (1941)
- Small Water Power Schemes (1945)

== Family ==
In 1899 at St Giles Cathedral he married Margaret Naismith Osborne Pagan (1878-1967) an opera singer. They had one son and one daughter.
