= Paul Bunge =

Inventor of the short-beam analytical balance

- Born: c. 1839
- Died: 1888 (aged 48–49)
- Citizenship: German
- Engineering career
- Discipline: Mechanical engineering

Paul Bunge (c. 1839–1888) is credited as the inventor of the short-beam analytical balance in 1866. The eponymous Paul Bunge Prize is awarded each year for outstanding publications in the history of scientific instruments.

Though short-beam balances were in use before 1866, Bunge was the first engineer to document a theory for their operation and started manufacturing the balances in Hamburg. It was Florenz Sartorius who from 1870 started the mass production of the scientific balances in his business in Göttingen.
