= James Cameron Smail =

Dr James Cameron Smail FRSE FRSGS PRSSA CBE LLD (1880–1970) was a Scottish university Principal. Heriot Watt University library is named the Cameron Smail Library in his honour. He wrote extensively on printing and the history of printing.

== Life ==
He was born in 1880, the son of Adam Smail, a bookseller and stationer in Bruntsfield, living at 18 Spittal Street in Tollcross, Edinburgh. He was privately educated at Daniel Stewart's College in Edinburgh. From 1902 until 1911 he was a school inspector in Ireland. In 1911 he appears to live at 31 Brighton Road in Rathmines on the outskirts of Dublin. From 1911 to 1928 he worked for London County Council.

In 1928 he became Principal of Heriot-Watt College and started a major expansion programme. In 1929 he was elected a Fellow of the Royal Society of Edinburgh. His proposers were Sir James Alfred Ewing, Richard Stanfield, Francis Gibson Baily and Alfred Archibald Boon. He was a regular attender of meetings.

He retired in 1950. In 1951 he was made a member of the Royal Fine Art Commission for Scotland. He died on 26 April 1970.

== Family ==
In 1908 he married Louisa Florence Davidson. His daughter was Elizabeth Margaret Cameron Smail.

== Artistic recognition ==
His portrait by Mary Remington is held at Heriot-Watt University.

== Publications ==
See

- Some Aspects of Education for the Printing Trade (1937)
- Technical Education (1946)
- Scottish Enterprise Printing (1947)
- James Watt and the Heriot Watt College (1949)
- Education and Training of Printers (1951)
- Printing in Scotland 1507-1947 (1963)
- The Phrenological Museum, Edinburgh (1963)
