= Richard Stanfield =

British civil engineer (1863–1950)

Professor Richard Stanfield PRSSA FRSE MICE MIMechE
- Born: 23 June 1863; England
- Died: 10 October 1950 (aged 87); England

Academic background
- Education: Manchester Grammar School; Royal School of Mines

Academic work
- Discipline: Mechanics; Engineering
- Institutions: Heriot-Watt College

Richard Stanfield PRSSA FRSE MICE MIMechE (23 June 1863 – 10 October 1950) was a British civil engineer active in the late 19th and early 20th centuries.

== Early life ==
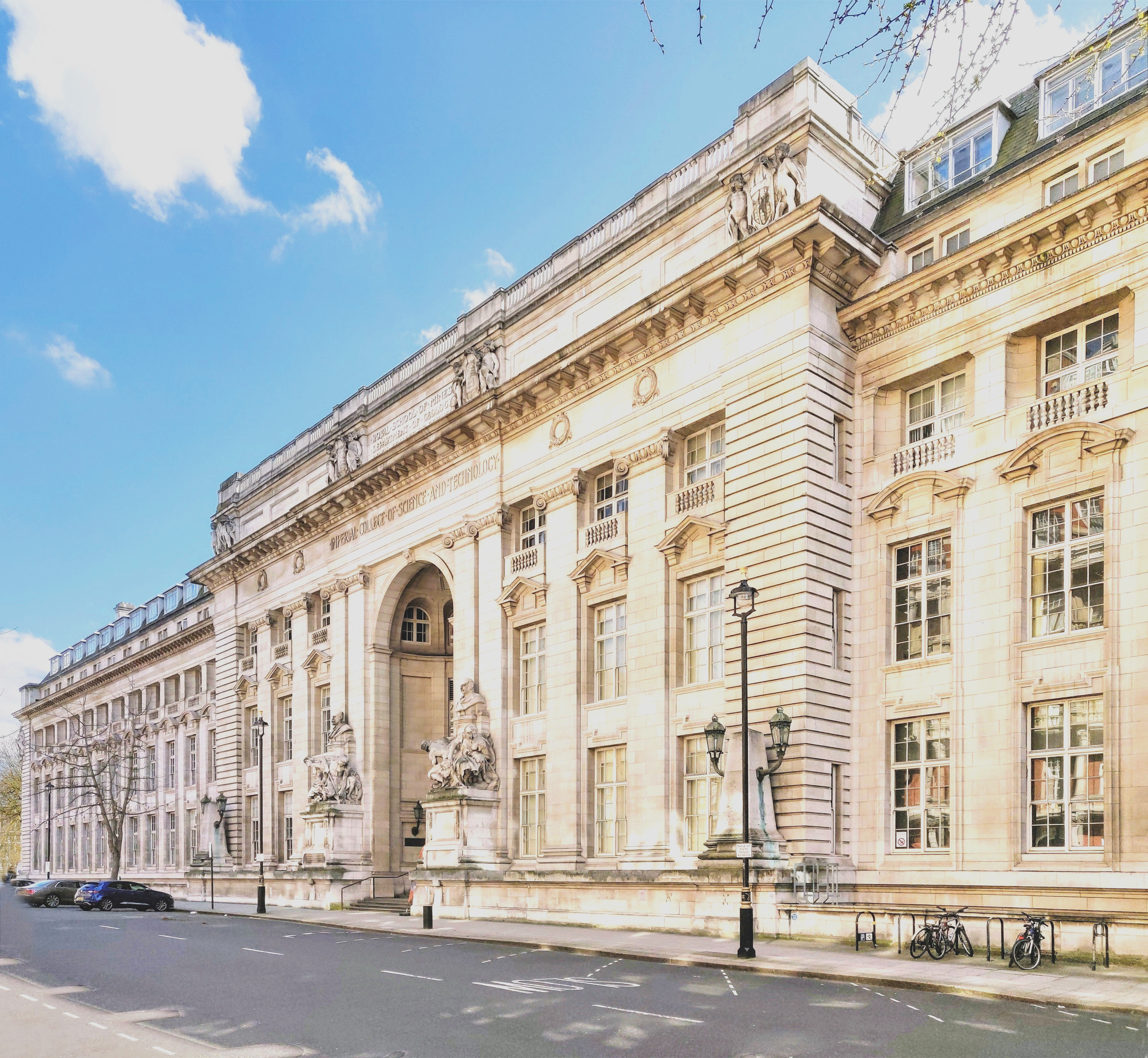
Royal School of Mines

Born in England on 23 June 1863, Stanfield was educated at the Manchester Grammar School, Manchester. In around 1877 he began an apprenticeship with the firm John Chadwick and Sons.

In 1883, he won a Senior Whitworth Scholarship and then studied mine engineering at the Royal School of Mines in London under Professor Thomas Minchin Goodeve.

He also studied metallurgy and assaying under Professor Sir William Roberts-Austen. He won the Bessemer Gold Medal for his class.

== Career ==
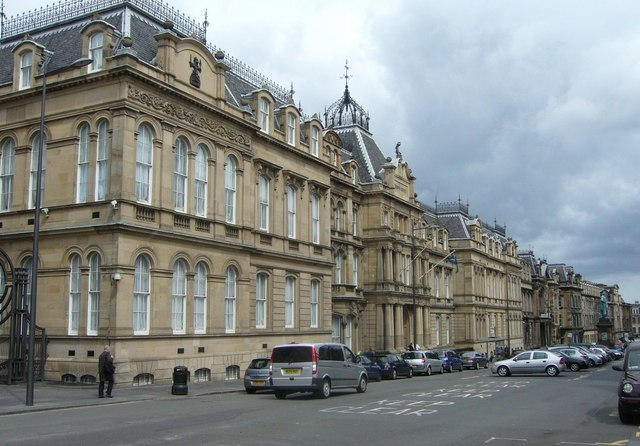
The former site of Heriot-Watt College, Edinburgh.

He became Professor of Mechanics and Engineering at Heriot-Watt College in 1889. In 1908 he helped to design the new laboratories for his department, under the sponsorship of Lord Rosebery. He was consultant to the Royal Highland and Agricultural Society of Scotland from 1900 to 1930. In 1906 he helped to organise the Motor Reliability Trials for the Scottish Automobile Club in which 84 cars took place: this was one of the first organised shows of vehicles in Britain.

In 1891 he was elected a fellow of the Royal Society of Edinburgh; his proposers were F. Grant Ogilvie, William Henry Perkin, Alexander Bruce and Sir Byrom Bramwell. In the same year he was elected a fellow of the Royal Scottish Society of Arts. He served as its president from 1921 to 1923. He lived at 19 Queen's Crescent in the Blacket district. He later moved to 24 Mayfield Gardens.

In the First World War he was Engineer and Secretary to the Board of Management to the Munitions Committee for south Scotland. He retired in 1930 and died on 19 October 1950.

== Selected publications ==
- The Campbell Oil Engine (1900)
