= Ned Barnie =

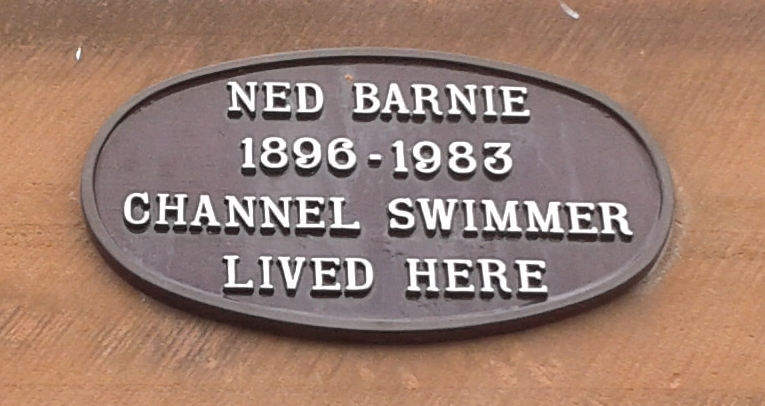
Plaque at 7 Straiton Place, where Ned Barnie once lived

Ned Barnie was the first Scot and oldest person ever to swim the English Channel in 1950, a record unequalled for 28 years.

== Early life and career ==
Born William Edward Barnie in 1896 in Portobello, Edinburgh, he gained a chemistry degree and taught at St Anthony's School in Lochend Road between 1969 and 1971. He also taught at both Darroch and David Kilpatrick's Schools.

His was widely known for his swimming exploits which are celebrated by the Channel Swimming Association. In 1932 he swam 20,000 lengths of Portobello Baths. He became President of the Scottish Swimming Association in 1946. In 1950, Barnie became the first Scot and oldest person to swim the English Channel.

In 1978 the Lord Provost presented him with a tie celebrating his three Channel swims in 1951.

In May 2018 it was proposed by the City of Edinburgh Council that a new street in Portobello, Barnie Terrace, would be named after him, and this has been done.

== Military career ==
Barnie entered the First World War in the 16th Battalion of the Royal Scots but in light of his university studies in chemistry he was transferred to the Special Brigade as a corporal. Later, he became an acting sergeant in the Royal Engineers. He was awarded the Military Medal in 1917.

== Family life ==
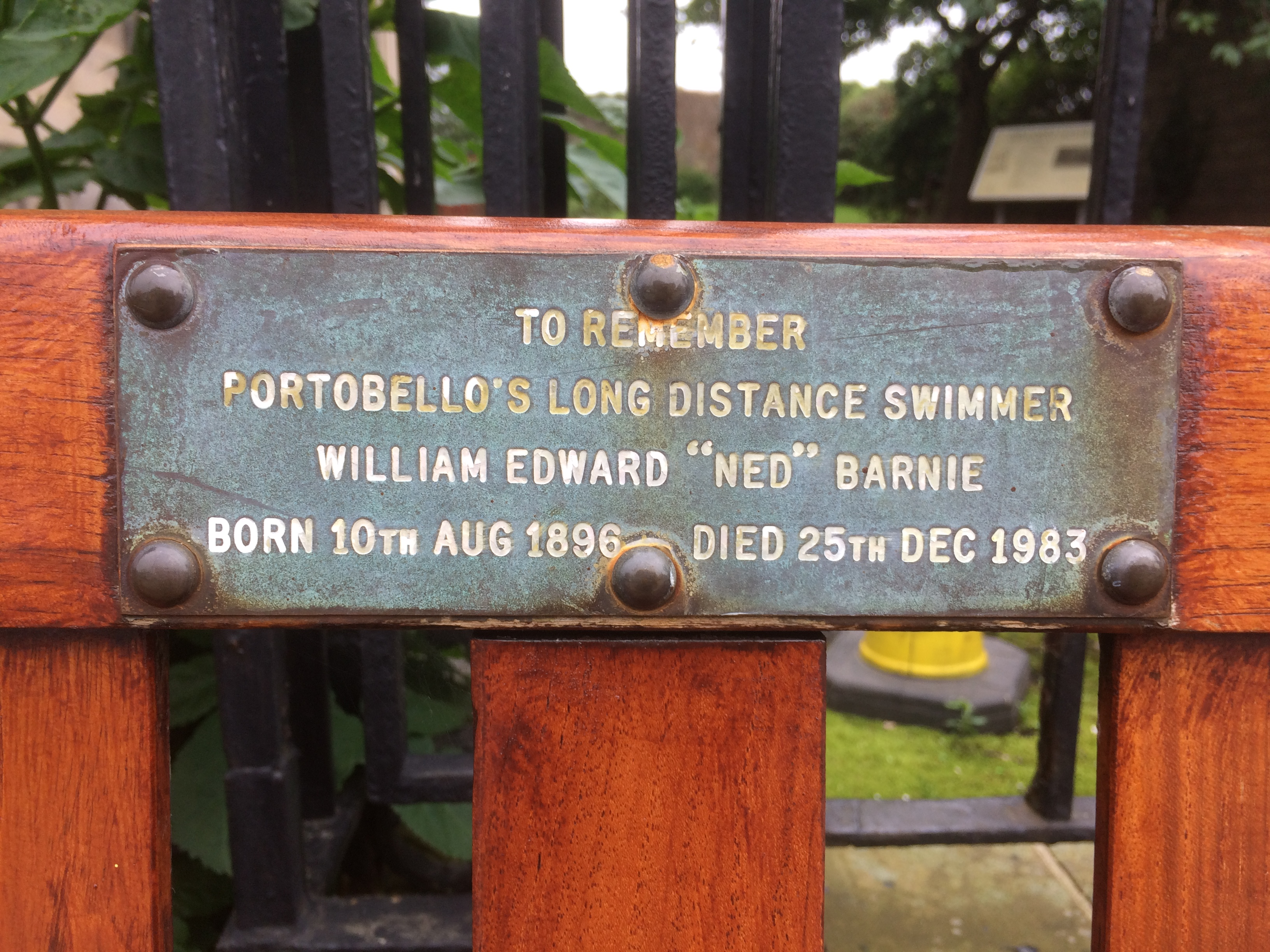
Memorial Bench Plaque for Ned Barnie, Portobello Town Hall

He married Catherine Stewart in 1924 and they had 4 children, Margaret Louise, Edith, Arthur, and Edward, and grandson, Philip Barnie/Grieve. He died at Edinburgh on 25 December 1983.
