= Misses Corbett =

Scottish authors

The Misses Corbett were sisters Walterina Cunningham (died 1 April 1837) and Grace Corbett (c. 1765/1770 – 11 June 1843). They were Scottish authors who wrote a number of books, poems and songs in the early nineteenth century, most notably a series of anthologies called The Odd Volume (1826–1827). While their books were published anonymously, generally as "by the authors of The Odd Volume", they were traditionally ascribed to "The Misses Corbett", "Misses M and — Corbett" or "Marion and Margaret Corbett".

== Biography ==
Walterina and Grace (born around 1765 or 1770) were the daughters of John Corbett (died 20 January 1815) of the ancient Glaswegian family of Corbett of Tollcross.

When only eleven years old, Grace was said to have composed the song "O Mary ye's be clad in silk", a new melody to a slightly altered version of the "Siller Crown". This was included in Peter Urbani's Selection of Scots Songs (1794), and James Johnson's Scots Musical Museum (1803).

The sisters lived in Portobello, Edinburgh. Walterina married John Cunningham of the 54th Regiment of the British Army. The sisters' niece Laura Corbett (1795–1863) lived with Grace, and may have assisted her with some of the books. An unidentified "H. C." is also given as the author of two songs and a waltz in The Odd Volume (1826), and may have been a relative of the sisters.

Their anthology The Odd Volume (1826) proved to be popular, with one publisher requesting a reprint of 750 copies, and an advance order for 1,250 copies of The Odd Volume: Second Series (1827), which contained entirely new material. The poem "We'll Go to Sea No More" from The Odd Volume: Second Series was reprinted a number of times, including in Henry Wadsworth Longfellow's Poems of Places (1874) where it was ascribed to Marion Corbett.

The sisters wrote a novel The Busy Bodies (1827) set in Portobello, with characters based on real people. Author William Baird wrote "That some of the characters represented were drawn from the life is only too evident from a statement we have heard that after its publication the Misses Corbett had to leave Portobello for a time to escape the wrath of the so-called Busybodies."

In 1828, one of the sisters' plays, Aloyse, was performed at the Theatre Royal, Edinburgh, and was said by author Ralston Inglis to have been a great success. This was followed two or three years later by another of their plays, A Week at Holyrood, or the Merry Days of James the Sixth.

Their book The Sisters' Budget was another anthology, with a preface dated "London, April 1831". Four years later in 1835, they applied to the Royal Literary Fund while living in Saint Saviour, Jersey.

They were correspondents with and considered by Thomas Aird to be friends of physician and writer David Macbeth Moir (1798–1851).

Walterina died on 1 April 1837, and Grace in Portobello, Edinburgh on 11 June 1843. They were both buried in Portobello Old Parish Church graveyard.

== Bibliography ==
=== Anthologies ===
- Petticoat Tales (1823)
- The Odd Volume (1826)
- The Odd Volume: Second Series (1827)
- Tales and Legends (1828)
- The Sisters' Budget (1831)
- The Cabinet for Youth (1831)
- Elucidations of Interesting Passages in the Sacred Volume (1835)
- Lessons for the Heart (1836)

=== Novels ===
- The Busy Bodies (1827)
- The Happy Week, or Holydays at Beechwood (1834), ascribed to Margaret Corbett
- The New Happy Week, or Holidays at Beechwood (1841), as by "M. Corbett, one of the Authors of The Cabinet for Youth..."

=== Plays ===
- "Guzzle", a dramatic fragment in The Odd Volume: Second Series (1827)
- "The Babbling Barber", a comedy in The Odd Volume: Second Series (1827)
- Aloyse (1828)
- A Week at Holyrood, or the Merry Days of James the Sixth (1830/31)

=== As contributors ===
- Selection of Scots Songs (1794), contains "O Mary ye's be clad in silk" by Grace Corbett
- Tales of All Nations (1827), contains a story by "one of the authors of The Odd Volume"
- The Edinburgh Literary Journal (1828–1831), contains several prose pieces and poems by "one of the authors of The Odd Volume"
- Friendship's Offering (1830), contains "Muirside Maggie: A Legend of Lammermuir" by "one of the authors of The Odd Volume"
- Friendship's Offering (1831), contains "Robin Riddell's Pose: A Legend of Lochar Moss" by "one of the authors of The Odd Volume"
