= Portobello Town Hall =

Municipal building in Portobello, Scotland

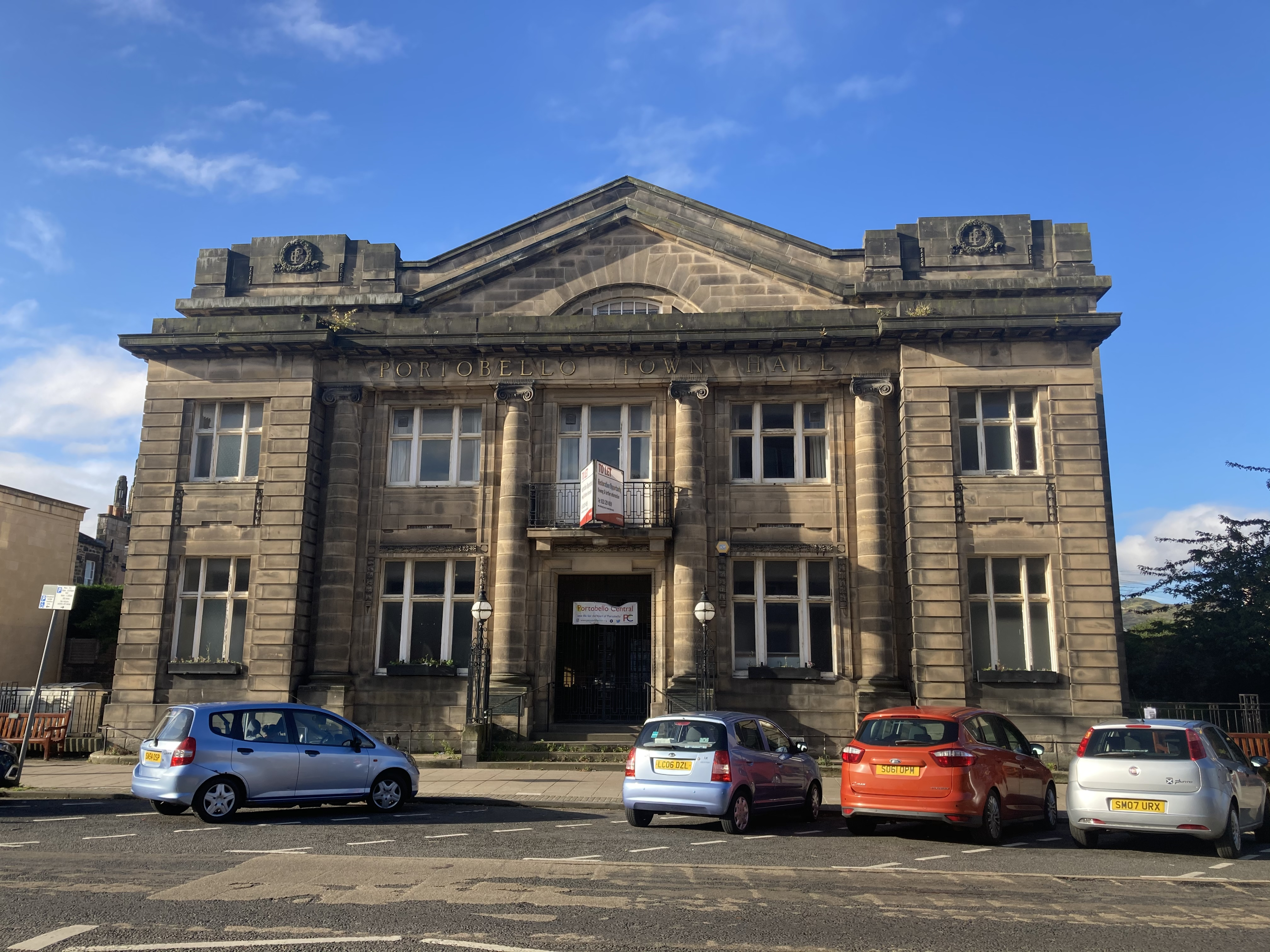
- Portobello Town Hall

- Shown in Edinburgh
- 55.9530°N 3.1153°W
- Location: Portobello High Street, Portobello

History
- Built: 1914

Site notes
- Architect: James Anderson Williamson
- Architectural style: Neoclassical style

Listed Building – Category B
- Official name: 147 Portobello High Street, Town Hall, including lamp standards
- Designated: 4 September 1995
- Reference no.: LB27391

Portobello Town Hall is a municipal structure in Portobello High Street, Portobello, Scotland. The building, which is managed by Portobello Central SCIO, a community body, is a Category B listed building.

== History ==
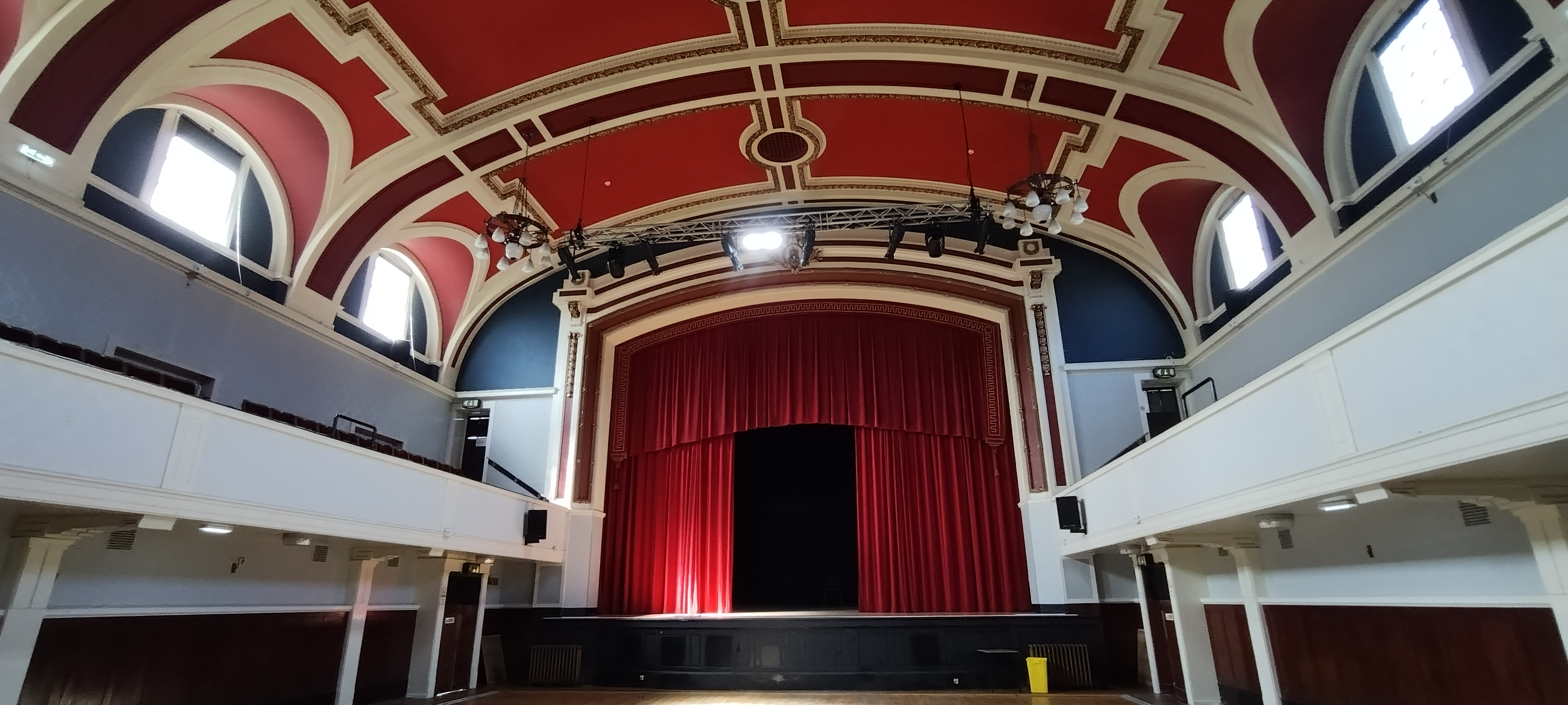
The interior of the Hall as of June 2024

Following significant population growth, largely associated with the status of Portobello as a seaside resort, the area became a burgh in 1833. The burgh commissioners initially met at No. 1 Brighton Place and then rented various rooms in different buildings before moving to Rosefield House in Adelphi Place in 1852. After finding this arrangement unsatisfactory, the burgh leaders decided to procure a purpose-built building: the first permanent municipal building, which was designed by David Bryce and erected at 189 Portobello High Street, was completed in May 1863. (Note: The first town hall went on to be an entertainment venue and is now Portobello Baptist Church.) The burgh leaders believed that the first building was not what they had specified, a dispute ensued and it was not long before another building was being procured: the second permanent municipal building, which was designed by Robert Paterson and erected at 118 Portobello High Street, was completed in autumn 1878. (Note: The second town hall went on to be a library and is now the Portobello Police Station.)

The second town hall ceased to be the local seat of government when the burgh of Portobello was annexed by the City of Edinburgh in 1896. As a consolation the people of Portobello were promised a new civic events venue which would become the third town hall. The site selected was occupied by Inverey House, which was a girls' orphanage established by the industrialist, John Christie.

The foundation stone for the new building was laid by the Lord Provost, Sir William Slater Brown, on 25 October 1912. It was designed by James Anderson Williamson in the neoclassical style, built in ashlar stone at a cost of £8,000 and was officially opened by the subsequent Lord Provost, Sir Robert Kirk Inches, on 30 October 1914. The design involved a symmetrical main frontage with five bays facing onto Portobello High Street with the end bays slightly projected forward and surmounted by blocking course bearing carvings of wreaths. The central section of three bays featured a square headed architraved doorway on the ground floor and a wrought iron balcony with French doors on the first floor, while the other bays in the central section and the end bays were fenestrated with sash windows. The bays in the central section were flanked by full height Ionic order columns supporting an entablature inscribed with the words "Portobello Town Hall", and a pediment with a Diocletian window in the tympanum. Internally, the principal room was the main assembly hall.

The first public event was a concert held later in 1914 in aid of Belgian refugees displaced by the German invasion of Belgium, and, in May 1915, the former member of parliament, Sir George McCrae used the town hall for rallies to recruit young soldiers for the Royal Scots. The future Prime Minister, Edward Heath, gave a speech to Young Conservatives at the town hall in March 1970.

The building continued to be used as an events venue into the early 21st century but, with running costs substantially exceeding revenue, the venue was being significantly subsidised by the City of Edinburgh Council. In June 2019, the town hall was closed by the city council after the masonry and plasterwork were found to be in poor condition. The city council put the building on the market for lease in February 2020, and, following a competitive process, it agreed to enter into exclusive talks with a local community organisation known as Portobello Central in May 2021. The city council confirmed, in June 2021, that it had allocated £350,000 of capital investment to the town hall project, money provided by the Scottish Government under its Place Based Investment Programme. Portobello Central, which became a Scottish Charitable Incorporated Organisation (SCIO) on 8 July 2021, said that it expects the building to re-open in April 2022.

On 10 November 2022, the Finance and Resources Committee of the City of Edinburgh Council agreed to offer Portobello Central SCIO a 25 Year, fully repairing, lease at £1 per year.

== See also ==
- List of listed buildings in Edinburgh/19
