= J. T. Walford =

James Thomas Walford (1833–1908) was an English ecclesiastical architect.

== Personal ==
Walford was born in Marylebone, London in 1833. His parents were James and Maria Walford. He married Priscilla Ann Waud in 1855. They moved to Scotland to live in Portobello in the late 1800s. They lived at No. 29 Joppa Road, Portobello. He died on 15 October 1908.

== Work ==
He was involved in the design of a number of churches in England and Scotland. These included the London Oratory, the Church of St. Alban, Leeds which is now demolished, and St John the Evangelist RC Church, Portobello
