= Big Beach Busk =

Annual music event in Portobello, Edinburgh, UK

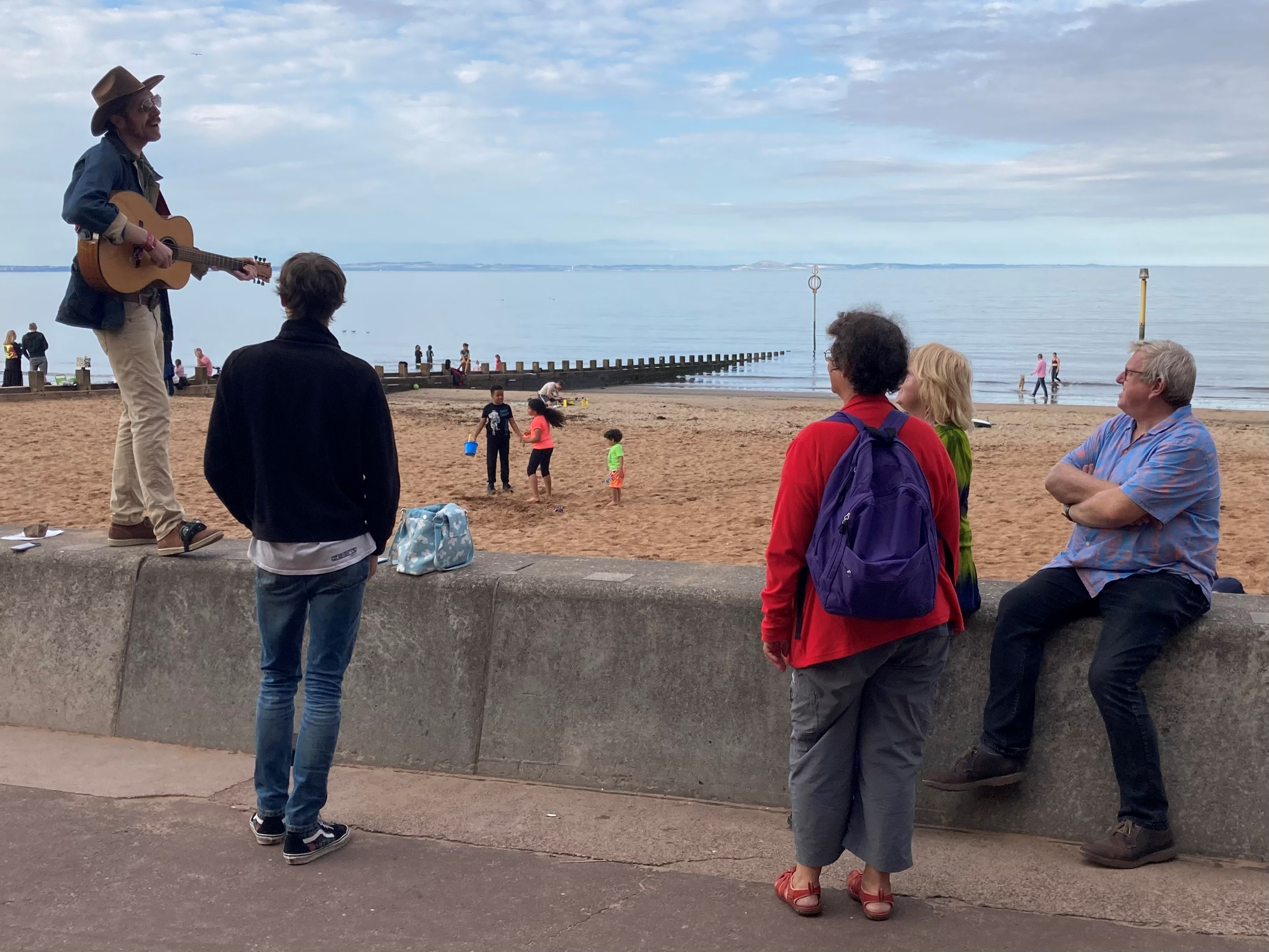
Busker playing to a crowd at Beach Busk 2022

The Big Beach Busk is an annual music and performance event which takes place on the last Saturday in August in Portobello, Edinburgh. It was founded by Edinburgh resident Paul Lambie in 2010, the event began with approximately 80 performers taking part; in 2018 the event attracted 400 musicians. It is estimated the event attracts around 15,000 visitors to Portobello every year.

The Busk has also hosted Portobello's annual sandcastle competition, which raised £196 in 2018 for Portobello Toddler Hut, and the Scottish Volleyball Association beach volleyball championships.
