= James Rankin (RAF officer) =

- Born: 7 May 1913; Portobello, Edinburgh, Scotland
- Died: March 1975 (aged 61)
- Military career
- Allegiance: United Kingdom
- Branch: Royal Air Force
- Service years: 1935–1958
- Rank: Air Commodore
- Unit: No. 64 Squadron RAF (1941)
- Commands: RAF Duxford (1954–58); No. 125 Wing RAF (1944–45); No. 15 Wing RAF (1943–44); No. 92 Squadron RAF (1941)
- Conflicts: Second World War: Channel Front; Normandy Campaign
- Awards: Distinguished Service Order & Bar; Distinguished Flying Cross & Bar; Croix de guerre (Belgium)

Air Commodore James Rankin, DSO & Bar, DFC & Bar (7 May 1913 – March 1975) was a Royal Air Force officer, fighter pilot and flying ace of the Second World War.

== Early life ==
Rankin was born in Portobello, Edinburgh on 7 May 1913, although his family later moved to Lancashire.

== RAF career ==
Rankin joined the Royal Air Force (RAF) in 1935 and, following training at No. 2 Flying Training School, he joined No. 25 Squadron and later flew with the Fleet Air Arm with 825 Naval Air Squadron on HMS Glorious. After service with the Fleet Air Arm he became an instructor with No. 5 Operational Training Unit.

Early in 1941 he was promoted to squadron leader and attached to No. 64 Squadron to gain operational experience. He claimed a third of a Junkers Ju 88 shot down and 2 damaged in his short spell with the squadron. In February 1941 he then took command of No. 92 Squadron, then equipping with the new Mark V model of Spitfire.

During the fighter sweeps of the summer, his score mounted rapidly. In June 1941 he was awarded the Distinguished Flying Cross (DFC) for 9 victories. On 14 June he shot down and killed 18-kill ace Obfw Robert Menge of III./ JG 26. Menge had been the wingman of the wing's commanding officer Adolf Galland.

In September 1941 he became wing leader at Biggin Hill and received the Distinguished Service Order (DSO) in October.

In December 1941 Rankin was posted to HQ Fighter Command, and in April 1942 returned to lead the Biggin Hill Wing for a second time until December 1942. After a spell as Officer Commanding the Central Gunnery School at RAF Sutton Bridge, in August 1943 he commanded No. 15 Fighter Wing, and then No. 125 Wing during the Normandy landings of June 1944.

Rankin scored 17 victories against enemy aircraft, as well as five shared kills, three probable and two shared probable kills, 16 damaged and three shared damaged, and the destruction of a V-1 flying bomb. Except for one shared destroy, one damaged, and two shared damaged, the rest of his total score was achieved while flying the Spitfire Mark V.

In 1948 he was Air Attaché, Dublin, and in 1954 was Officer Commanding RAF Duxford. He retired from the RAF in 1958, and died in March 1975.

== Bibliography ==
- Price, Dr. Alfred. Spitfire Mark V Aces 1941–1945. London: Osprey, 1997. ISBN 978-1-85532-635-4.
