= Madge Elder =

Scottish gardener, writer and feminist

Margaret Moffat Elder
- Born: 17 July 1893; Portobello, Scotland
- Died: 25 December 1985; Edinburgh, Scotland
- Education: First class certificate in horticulture Edinburgh School of Gardening for Women in Corstorphine 1912
- Known for: Pioneering female gardener, writer
- Parents: John Elder (father); Margaret Virtue (mother)

Margaret Moffat (Madge) Elder (17 July 1893 – 25 December 1985) was a Scottish gardener, plant nursery owner, writer and feminist. She published two books on the history and folklore of the Scottish Borders, as well as regular articles for the Weekly Scotsman and The Scots Magazine. She recognised similarities between the suffrage movement and pioneering women gardeners.

== Early life and education ==
Madge Elder was born in Portobello, near Edinburgh, on 17 July 1893 to Margaret Virtue and John Elder, a marine engineer. She was brought up on a farm in Berwickshire and educated at Gordon village school. She was solely reliant on lip-reading for communication due to deafness.

At the age of 19, she was in one of the first classes to graduate from Scotland's first horticultural college for women: the Edinburgh School of Gardening for Women in Corstorphine, graduating with a first-class certificate in horticulture. Elder held gardening positions at the Priory in Melrose and joined the Duke of Buccleuch’s estate at Bowhill in 1918 as head gardener under the red cross.

Madge Elder retired from gardening in 1948 to become a writer.

== Publications ==
Madge wrote three works during her lifetime

1. Ballad Country, first published in 1963
2. Tell the Towers thereof: the ancient Border story, first published in 1956
3. Winter Garland, first published in 1947
