= Edinburgh School of Gardening for Women =

The Edinburgh School of Gardening for Women was a Scottish institution that sought to educate women in the traditions of gardening and horticulture. After first opening in Inveresk, East Lothian until April 1902, it then moved to a larger site in the West of Edinburgh on Kaimes Road in Corstorphine.

== History ==
The school's founding on October 23, 1903, was a significant milestone for women in pursuit of education and careers in horticulture. Annie Morison and Lina Barker, the school's founders, were joined by Lady Aberdeen, who inaugurated the institution. This event took place during a time when women faced numerous obstacles and were largely excluded from formal education and professional opportunities, especially in horticulture and related fields.

The school's establishment aimed to empower women by equipping them with the necessary skills and knowledge to excel in the horticulture industry. Professor Isaac Bayley Balfour, in attendance at the opening ceremony, expressed his gratitude to Lady Aberdeen for her dedication to the welfare of women.

Throughout its history, the Edinburgh School of Gardening for Women played an important role in advancing women's progress in horticulture and various other fields. Graduates of the institution embarked on successful careers as horticulturists, gardeners, and landscapers. The school's influence can still be felt today, as women continue to pursue these professions.

== Curriculum ==
The school's programs were designed to provide women with the skills and knowledge necessary to become successful horticulturists, gardeners, and landscapers.

The School of Gardening advertised throughout its years for applications within The Scotsman newspaper. Prospectus brochures could be obtained on application direct from the founders Miss Barker and Miss Morison who advertised Gardening as a Career for Women as Fine Open Air Work and sold the benefits of working outside as one of the most healthy careers alongside two years of practical knowledge that would you make you more independent as a woman alongside presenting an opportunity to secure cottage to call home.

Member of the public could also buy plants such as Rock Plants, Incarvillea, Grandiflora and Gentiana Acaulis directly from the School of Gardening

== Founders ==
Co-founder Lina Barker, at the age of 31 set up Scotland's first School of Gardening after having previously being employed at the Royal Botanic Garden Edinburgh as one of the first female employees.

At the time of joining the Royal Botanics, Barker had to accept terms in which she had to discreetly dress as a boy; this included tucking long hair into a boy's cap.

== Notable alumni ==
Madge Elder is a graduate of the school.

Miss Georgina Balfour, the daughter of Rev. Dr R G Balfour who was Moderator of the United Free Church of Scotland, graduated from the Edinburgh School of Gardening for Women and went on to be appointed the Chief Gardener at the Guthrie Industrial School for Girls, Gilmerton, founded in 1847 by Dr. Thomas Guthrie.
