= List of listed buildings in Edinburgh/19 =

This is a list of listed buildings in Edinburgh, Scotland.

== List ==
| Name | Location | Date Listed | Grid Ref. (Note: Sometimes known as OSGB36, the grid reference (where provided) is based on the British national grid reference system used by the Ordnance Survey. • "Guide to National Grid". Ordnance Survey. • "Get-a-map". Ordnance Survey.) | Geo-coordinates | Notes | LB Number (Note: Historic Environment Scotland assign a unique alphanumeric identifier to each designated site in Scotland, for listed buildings this always begins with "LB", for example "LB12345".) | Image |
|---|---|---|---|---|---|---|---|
| Belford Road Windmill | | | | 55°57′02″N 3°13′47″W | Category B | 28147 | Upload Photo |
| 10 And 12 School Brae, Bonnington Cottage And Cockle Mill | | | | 55°58′30″N 3°18′12″W | Category C(S) | 28164 | Upload Photo |
| 29 Dowie's Mill Lane, Primrose Cottage, Including Boundary Wall | | | | 55°58′02″N 3°18′56″W | Category B | 28167 | Upload Photo |
| 338 Gilmerton Road | | | | 55°54′55″N 3°09′00″W | Category C(S) | 28177 | Upload Photo |
| Duddingston House Gates | | | | 55°56′33″N 3°07′49″W | Category B | 28066 | Upload another image |
| Inverleith House (Gallery Of Modern Art) Arboretum Road And Inverleith Row | | | | 55°57′54″N 3°12′37″W | Category B | 28081 | Upload another image |
| 80-84 (Even Numbers) Kingston Avenue, Former Kingston Clinic | | | | 55°55′10″N 3°09′04″W | Category A | 28082 | Upload Photo |
| 33 And 35 Lochend Road South, Lochend House, Including Boundary Walls, Gatepiers And Railings | | | | 55°57′37″N 3°09′33″W | Category B | 28087 | Upload Photo |
| 19 Winton Loan, Morton House, Including Walled Courtyard, Garage And Well | | | | 55°53′50″N 3°11′38″W | Category A | 28092 | Upload Photo |
| Nether Liberton, Old Mill Lane, Nether Liberton House | | | | 55°55′25″N 3°09′52″W | Category B | 28101 | Upload Photo |
| Peffermill House Peffermill Road | | | | 55°55′57″N 3°08′56″W | Category A | 28106 | Upload Photo |
| 195 Queensferry Road, Ravelston House Gatepiers And Gates | | | | 55°57′25″N 3°14′53″W | Category C(S) | 28114 | Upload Photo |
| 133, 135 And 137 Redford Road, Redford House With Former Bleaching House, Other Outbuildings And Boundary Wall | | | | 55°54′21″N 3°14′27″W | Category B | 28115 | Upload Photo |
| 5 And 6 Chambers Street, Adam House | | | | 55°56′53″N 3°11′15″W | Category B | 27990 | Upload Photo |
| University Of Edinburgh New Building Teviot Place Teviot Row And Middle Meadow Walk | | | | 55°56′41″N 3°11′26″W | Category A | 27992 | Upload another image |
| University Of Edinburgh Mcewan Lantern Pillar Teviot Row And Teviot Place | | | | 55°56′43″N 3°11′20″W | Category B | 27994 | Upload another image |
| Edinburgh Castle, Esplanade | | | | 55°56′55″N 3°11′51″W | Category A | 28011 | Upload another image |
| Holyroodhouse Palace, Forecourt, Fountain | | | | 55°57′09″N 3°10′23″W | Category A | 28024 | Upload another image See more images |
| 44 And 45 Water Street (Formerly 42 And 43 Water Street) | | | | 55°58′29″N 3°10′11″W | Category B | 27919 | Upload Photo |
| 5, 6 And 7 Wellington Place With Boundary Walls And Railings | | | | 55°58′16″N 3°10′11″W | Category B | 27922 | Upload Photo |
| Warriston Road, Warriston Cemetery, With All Monuments, Catacombs, Bridge, Boundary Walls, Gates And Gatepiers | | | | 55°58′05″N 3°11′53″W | Category A | 27937 | Upload another image See more images |
| 22-24 Warrender Park Crescent, Former Boroughmuir School, Including Boundary Wall, Railings And Gatepiers | | | | 55°56′19″N 3°12′08″W | Category B | 27968 | Upload another image |
| Calton Hill, Off Regent Road, Playfair's Monument | | | | 55°57′17″N 3°10′59″W | Category A | 27826 | Upload another image |
| 4 And 5 Mitchell Street | | | | 55°58′28″N 3°10′00″W | Category B | 27828 | Upload Photo |
| High Street, Memorial To Walter Francis, 5Th Duke Of Buccleuch And 7Th Duke Of Queensberry | | | | 55°56′58″N 3°11′30″W | Category A | 27844 | Upload another image |
| Parliament Square, Charles Ii Statue | | | | 55°56′57″N 3°11′26″W | Category A | 27851 | Upload another image |
| High Street, City Chambers Courtyard, Alexander And Bucephalus Statue | | | | 55°57′00″N 3°11′25″W | Category A | 27855 | Upload another image |
| 45 Queen Charlotte Street With Boundary Walls And Railings | | | | 55°58′25″N 3°10′00″W | Category B | 27859 | Upload Photo |
| 53 Queen Charlotte Street With Boundary Walls Gatepiers And Railings | | | | 55°58′25″N 3°09′59″W | Category B | 27863 | Upload Photo |
| West Princes Street Gardens, Allan Ramsay Monument | | | | 55°57′06″N 3°11′50″W | Category A | 27870 | Upload another image |
| West Princes Street Gardens, Scottish American Memorial | | | | 55°57′04″N 3°12′04″W | Category B | 27874 | Upload another image |
| St Anthony Place, Trafalgar Masonic Lodge | | | | 55°58′19″N 3°10′21″W | Category C(S) | 27880 | Upload Photo |
| High Street, Netherbow Wellhead | | | | 55°57′02″N 3°11′07″W | Category A | 27901 | Upload another image |
| West Princes Street Gardens, Ross Fountain | | | | 55°57′00″N 3°12′11″W | Category A | 27911 | Upload another image |
| Royal Victoria Hospital, Gateway, Craigleith Road | | | | 55°57′29″N 3°13′45″W | Category B | 27752 | Upload Photo |
| 328 Leith Walk | | | | 55°57′53″N 3°10′39″W | Category C(S) | 27759 | Upload Photo |
| Niddry Street And Cowgate, St Cecilia's Hall | | | | 55°56′56″N 3°11′11″W | Category A | 27760 | Upload another image |
| 9 And 11 West Brighton Crescent | | | | 55°57′05″N 3°07′09″W | Category B | 27762 | Upload Photo |
| Queen Street, Scottish National Portrait Gallery With Lamp Standards | | | | 55°57′20″N 3°11′37″W | Category A | 27764 | Upload another image |
| 6 West Brighton Crescent | | | | 55°57′05″N 3°07′06″W | Category B | 27782 | Upload Photo |
| 7, 8 Maritime Street | | | | 55°58′28″N 3°10′08″W | Category B | 27795 | Upload Photo |
| 42 Maritime Street | | | | 55°58′28″N 3°10′06″W | Category C(S) | 27812 | Upload Photo |
| 45-46A Maritime Street | | | | 55°58′28″N 3°10′07″W | Category C(S) | 27815 | Upload Photo |
| Union Canal, Bridge No 15 (Ratho Village, Baird Road) | | | | 55°55′24″N 3°22′44″W | Category B | 27817 | Upload Photo |
| 8 Mill Lane, Taylor Gardens And King Street, Leith Hospital With Stalk, Gates And Railings | | | | 55°58′27″N 3°10′33″W | Category B | 27822 | Upload Photo |
| 12 Leith Walk 3 And 5 Kirk Street And 1 Cassel's Lane With Boundary Walls And Railings | | | | 55°58′13″N 3°10′22″W | Category B | 27659 | Upload Photo |
| Ratho Park With Terrace Walls And Gates | | | | 55°55′24″N 3°21′41″W | Category A | 27661 | Upload Photo |
| 11 Rosefield Avenue | | | | 55°57′10″N 3°07′01″W | Category B | 27662 | Upload Photo |
| 25 And 27 Nile Grove | | | | 55°55′35″N 3°12′23″W | Category B | 27664 | Upload Photo |
| 23 Tipperlinn Road, Royal Edinburgh Hospital, Church Centre | | | | 55°55′35″N 3°13′05″W | Category B | 27713 | Upload Photo |
| 3 And 4 Sandford Gardens | | | | 55°57′06″N 3°06′54″W | Category B | 27716 | Upload Photo |
| Ratho Village, 12 And 14 (Even Nos) Baird Road With Wall And Gatepiers | | | | 55°55′22″N 3°22′41″W | Category B | 27720 | Upload Photo |
| 12 Tipperlinn Road, Viewfield House, With Boundary Walls Gatepiers And Gates | | | | 55°55′51″N 3°12′52″W | Category C(S) | 27723 | Upload Photo |
| 149 Rose Street, Former Telephone Exchange | | | | 55°57′06″N 3°12′17″W | Category B | 27724 | Upload Photo |
| 9 And 10 Queen Street, Royal College Of Physicians, With Front Wall And Lamp Standards | | | | 55°57′18″N 3°11′47″W | Category A | 27732 | Upload Photo |
| Leith Docks, Edinburgh Dry Dock | | | | 55°58′38″N 3°09′33″W | Category B | 27611 | Upload Photo |
| Morningside Terrace, Tipperlinn Cottage (Royal Edinburgh Hospital) | | | | 55°55′41″N 3°12′47″W | Category C(S) | 27626 | Upload Photo |
| Leith Docks, Prince Of Wales Dry Dock | | | | 55°58′46″N 3°10′07″W | Category B | 27629 | Upload Photo |
| 11 West Harbour Road, Former Custom House | | | | 55°58′52″N 3°13′34″W | Category B | 27651 | Upload Photo |
| Kirkliston Village, 76-82 (Even Nos), Main Street, Newliston Arms Hotel | | | | 55°57′22″N 3°24′08″W | Category C(S) | 27510 | Upload Photo |
| St Stephen's Church (C Of S) St Stephen Street And St Vincent Street | | | | 55°57′31″N 3°12′13″W | Category A | 27527 | Upload another image |
| 2 Rutland Place And Rutland Street At Rear, Berkeley Casino, (Former St Thomas's Church, Latterly Scottish Tourist Board), Including Railings, Piers And Lamp Standards | | | | 55°56′59″N 3°12′30″W | Category B | 27532 | Upload Photo |
| Kirkliston Village, 5A Newliston Road, Smithy And Boundary Wall | | | | 55°57′07″N 3°24′18″W | Category B | 27533 | Upload Photo |
| 11 John's Place, Former St James's Church Rectory | | | | 55°58′21″N 3°10′02″W | Category B | 27545 | Upload Photo |
| 41-45 (Odd Nos) Morningside Road And 1-5 (Odd Nos) Church Hill Place | | | | 55°55′56″N 3°12′35″W | Category B | 27556 | Upload Photo |
| Newbridge At River Almond, Newbridge Village | | | | 55°56′24″N 3°24′41″W | Category B | 27572 | Upload Photo |
| 6 And 6B Kirk Street | | | | 55°58′14″N 3°10′21″W | Category C(S) | 27574 | Upload Photo |
| Chester Street And Palmerston Place, St Mary's Cathedral (Episcopal), Walpole Hall And Song School | | | | 55°56′57″N 3°13′01″W | Category A | 27448 | Upload another image |
| 4 Broughton Street, St James Place, And Chapel Lane, St Mary's (Roman Catholic) Cathedral, With St Andrew's Hall, Terrace, Steps And Railings | | | | 55°57′21″N 3°11′18″W | Category B | 27449 | Upload Photo |
| 88, 89, 90, 91 Giles Street | | | | 55°58′24″N 3°10′21″W | Category C(S) | 27453 | Upload Photo |
| 98-99A Giles Street | | | | 55°58′23″N 3°10′19″W | Category B | 27459 | Upload Photo |
| 5 Jordan Lane, Ainslie Cottage, And Boundary Wall | | | | 55°55′38″N 3°12′29″W | Category C(S) | 27460 | Upload Photo |
| 118 Portobello High Street, Police Station | | | | 55°57′14″N 3°06′55″W | Category B | 27463 | Upload another image |
| 158-162 (Even Nos) Portobello High Street, 2 And 4 Bath Street And Public Lavatories | | | | 55°57′11″N 3°06′51″W | Category C(S) | 27468 | Upload Photo |
| 174-184 (Even Nos) Portobello High Street | | | | 55°57′10″N 3°06′49″W | Category C(S) | 27477 | Upload Photo |
| 28 Brougham Street, St Michael And All Saints Church (Episcopal) | | | | 55°56′36″N 3°12′05″W | Category A | 27489 | Upload Photo |
| 45 And 45B Portland Street With Front Walls Steps And Railings; Eh6 4Az | | | | 55°58′37″N 3°10′57″W | Category B | 27361 | Upload Photo |
| 76 And 78 Polwarth Terrace With Boundary Walls Gatepiers And Railings | | | | 55°55′53″N 3°13′34″W | Category B | 27370 | Upload Photo |
| 147 Portobello High Street, Town Hall, Including Lamp Standards | | | | 55°57′11″N 3°06′55″W | Category B | 27391 | Upload another image |
| 6 Greenhill Park | | | | 55°55′59″N 3°12′30″W | Category B | 27393 | Upload Photo |
| 54 Hermiston, Hermiston Old Farmhouse | | | | 55°55′06″N 3°19′10″W | Category B | 27396 | Upload Photo |
| 177 Portobello High Street, Royal Bank Of Scotland, (Formerly National Bank Of Scotland) | | | | 55°57′09″N 3°06′50″W | Category B | 27398 | Upload Photo |
| Lothian Road, St John's Church (Episcopal), Hall, Churchyard, Boundary Walls, Steps, Railings, Gatepiers, Vaults And Monuments | | | | 55°57′00″N 3°12′22″W | Category A | 27401 | Upload another image See more images |
| 2 Spylaw Road Teviot House With Stable Block | | | | 55°55′59″N 3°13′06″W | Category B | 27410 | Upload another image |
| 42-44/1,2,3,4(Even Numbers) Spylaw Road | | | | 55°55′56″N 3°13′15″W | Category B | 27423 | Upload another image |
| 14 Hermitage Drive And 20 Corrennie Gardens | | | | 55°55′13″N 3°12′24″W | Category C(S) | 27426 | Upload Photo |
| 2 And 4A, 4B,4C And 4/1-4/22 (Inclusive Nos) Lochend Road (Former Leith Academy Secondary School) With Boundary Wall, Gatepiers And Railings | | | | 55°58′10″N 3°10′03″W | Category B | 27432 | Upload Photo |
| Tolbooth Wynd Bridge | | | | 55°58′31″N 3°10′20″W | Category B | 27435 | Upload Photo |
| 67 Giles Street, St Mary's Workshops, Former Yardheads School | | | | 55°58′21″N 3°10′21″W | Category C(S) | 27439 | Upload Photo |
| 24 Hermitage Drive, Shieldaig | | | | 55°55′14″N 3°12′05″W | Category A | 27440 | Upload Photo |
| 44, 44A, 46 And 46A Constitution Street | | | | 55°58′29″N 3°10′03″W | Category B | 27295 | Upload Photo |
| 1-7 Odd Nos Polwarth Gardens And 1 And 3 Polwarth Crescent | | | | 55°56′15″N 3°13′02″W | Category B | 27307 | Upload Photo |
| 143 Grange Loan, Astley Ainslie Hospital, North And South Lodges, Gatepiers And Gates | | | | 55°55′43″N 3°12′04″W | Category A | 27310 | Upload Photo |
| St Columba's Church (C Of S) Queensferry Road And Columba Road Blackhall | | | | 55°57′30″N 3°15′08″W | Category B | 27318 | Upload Photo |
| 27 Polwarth Terrace | | | | 55°56′03″N 3°13′21″W | Category B | 27328 | Upload Photo |
| Polwarth Terrace Polwarth Parish Church And Hall Former Free Church With Gatepiers And Railings | | | | 55°56′02″N 3°13′25″W | Category B | 27335 | Upload another image |
| Hatton Estate, Garden Temple | | | | 55°54′14″N 3°23′52″W | Category B | 27348 | Upload Photo |
| 106 Constitution Street, St Mary Star Of The Sea (Rc) Church With Boundary Walls, Gatepiers And Gates | | | | 55°58′24″N 3°10′09″W | Category B | 27358 | Upload Photo |
| Glasgow Road, Norton House Hotel, Former West Lodge, Demijohn Cottage With Boundary Wall And Gatepiers | | | | 55°56′00″N 3°23′21″W | Category C(S) | 27222 | Upload Photo |
| 17-19 (Odd Nos) Montpelier And 22-26 (Even Nos) Bruntsfield Avenue | | | | 55°56′14″N 3°12′35″W | Category B | 27246 | Upload Photo |
| 141-147 (Odd Nos) Constitution Street | | | | 55°58′27″N 3°11′01″W | Category B | 27248 | Upload Photo |
| Montpelier Park Boroughmuir High School Annexe Formerly St Oswald's Church And Church Halls | | | | 55°56′13″N 3°12′41″W | Category B | 27254 | Upload another image |
| 13 East Brighton Crescent | | | | 55°57′02″N 3°07′02″W | Category B | 27255 | Upload Photo |
| 28 Lauriston Street, Sacred Heart Church (Roman Catholic), With Boundary Wall, Gatepiers, Gates And Railings | | | | 55°56′42″N 3°12′05″W | Category A | 27266 | Upload another image See more images |
| 194 Glasgow Road, Former Gogar Parish Church And Graveyard | | | | 55°56′19″N 3°19′59″W | Category B | 27268 | Upload Photo |
| 76 Promenade, 20 And 21 Bedford Terrace Including Gatepiers And Boundary Walls | | | | 55°57′02″N 3°06′02″W | Category B | 27269 | Upload Photo |
| Malleny Estate, Dovecot | | | | 55°53′05″N 3°20′11″W | Category A | 27153 | Upload Photo |
| Glasgow Road, Gogar Mount House, West Lodge, Boundary Wall, Gatepiers And Railings | | | | 55°56′05″N 3°21′03″W | Category C(S) | 27159 | Upload Photo |
| 1 Willowbrae Road, New Restalrig Parish Church (Church Of Scotland), With Hall And Retaining Wall | | | | 55°57′17″N 3°08′55″W | Category B | 27166 | Upload Photo |
| 1 Brighton Public Park, Sundial | | | | 55°57′04″N 3°07′00″W | Category B | 27173 | Upload Photo |
| 108 (Gf And 1F) And 110 Newhaven Road With Front Wall; Eh6 4Br | | | | 55°58′24″N 3°11′18″W | Category C(S) | 27186 | Upload Photo |
| 67 Colinton Road, George Watson's College, Main School, Lodge and Gatepiers, War Memorial and Rifle Range | | | | 55°55′51″N 3°13′10″W | Category B | 27193 | Upload another image |
| 2 Mansfield Road, Dean Park House With Gatepiers And Boundary Wall | | | | 55°52′53″N 3°20′24″W | Category B | 27199 | Upload Photo |
| 1-7 (Odd Nos) Merchiston Place And 2, 4 Montpelier Park | | | | 55°56′09″N 3°12′38″W | Category B | 27216 | Upload Photo |
| 5 And 6 East Brighton Crescent | | | | 55°57′02″N 3°06′55″W | Category B | 27217 | Upload Photo |
| 12 And 13 Casselbank Street, Destiny Church | | | | 55°58′12″N 3°10′24″W | Category B | 27098 | Upload Photo |
| 15 Main Street, Malleny Arms Hotel | | | | 55°53′02″N 3°20′19″W | Category C(S) | 27106 | Upload Photo |
| Glasgow Road, Castle Gogar Lodge And Gates And Gatepiers | | | | 55°56′19″N 3°19′45″W | Category B | 27112 | Upload Photo |
| Glasgow Road, Gogar Mount House | | | | 55°56′05″N 3°20′56″W | Category B | 27129 | Upload Photo |
| 11 Church Hill With Coach House | | | | 55°55′57″N 3°12′23″W | Category C(S) | 27028 | Upload Photo |
| 527, Lanark Road West, Ravelrig Estate, Stables, Steading And Steading House | | | | 55°53′12″N 3°20′43″W | Category B | 27035 | Upload Photo |
| 527, Lanark Road West, Ravelrig Estate, Walled Garden | | | | 55°53′11″N 3°20′33″W | Category B | 27045 | Upload Photo |
| 37 Brighton Place | | | | 55°57′02″N 3°07′03″W | Category B | 27056 | Upload Photo |
| Hope Park & Buccleuch Congregational Church Hope Park Terrace | | | | 55°56′26″N 3°10′53″W | Category B | 27060 | Upload Photo |
| Leith Docks, Former Old East Dock Entrance, With Locks, Swing Bridge, Winches, Boundary Wall, Gatepiers And 1C Dock Place, Waterfront Wine Bar (Former Lock Keeper's Lodge) | | | | 55°58′39″N 3°10′17″W | Category B | 27061 | Upload Photo |
| Foxhall Dovecot | | | | 55°57′08″N 3°23′28″W | Category B | 27062 | Upload Photo |
| 13 Duncan Street, Duncan Street Baptist Church | | | | 55°56′07″N 3°10′42″W | Category B | 26937 | Upload Photo |
| 16-20 (Inclusive Nos) Mcleod Street | | | | 55°56′24″N 3°13′51″W | Category B | 26938 | Upload another image |
| 10 And 12 Bellfield Street | | | | 55°57′06″N 3°06′32″W | Category B | 26945 | Upload Photo |
| 4 Smith's Place | | | | 55°58′02″N 3°10′27″W | Category B | 26946 | Upload Photo |
| 11 And 13 John Street | | | | 55°57′06″N 3°06′16″W | Category C(S) | 26953 | Upload Photo |
| 9 Lochend Road With Boundary Wall And Railings | | | | 55°58′07″N 3°09′59″W | Category C(S) | 26955 | Upload Photo |
| 6-10 (Even Nos) Smith's Place | | | | 55°58′01″N 3°10′26″W | Category B | 26958 | Upload Photo |
| 15 Morningside Road, Eric Liddell Centre, Formerly North Morningside Church | | | | 55°56′02″N 3°12′35″W | Category B | 26983 | Upload another image See more images |
| 2 Charterhall Road, Blackford Hill Lodge | | | | 55°55′33″N 3°11′37″W | Category B | 26994 | Upload Photo |
| 3-5 Dalmahoy, St Mary's Episcopal Rectory, Church Hall And Rectory Cottage (Off A71) | | | | 55°54′34″N 3°21′59″W | Category C(S) | 26999 | Upload Photo |
| 69 And 71 Restalrig Road With Boundary Wall | | | | 55°58′04″N 3°09′28″W | Category C(S) | 27002 | Upload Photo |
| 22 Bellfield Street | | | | 55°57′09″N 3°06′29″W | Category C(S) | 27004 | Upload Photo |
| 6, 6B And 6C Bruntsfield Terrace, Bruntsfield House | | | | 55°56′12″N 3°12′23″W | Category C(S) | 26873 | Upload Photo |
| 20 Colinton Road Redholme With Boundary Walls And Gatepiers | | | | 55°55′54″N 3°13′06″W | Category B | 26881 | Upload Photo |
| 2 Bernard Street And 28 Constitution Street | | | | 55°58′32″N 3°10′00″W | Category B | 26886 | Upload Photo |
| 4 And 5 Hermitage Place With Boundary Walls | | | | 55°58′09″N 3°09′51″W | Category B | 26894 | Upload Photo |
| 13-15 (Odd Nos) Smith's Place | | | | 55°58′02″N 3°10′24″W | Category B | 26909 | Upload Photo |
| 17 Smith's Place, Former Chemical Works | | | | 55°58′02″N 3°10′22″W | Category B | 26921 | Upload Photo |
| 1 Lochend Road With Boundary Wall | | | | 55°58′08″N 3°10′00″W | Category B | 26931 | Upload Photo |
| 15 Braid Road Cluny Church Centre With Boundary Wall And Railings (Former South Morningside Free Church And Morningisde South Church) | | | | 55°55′25″N 3°12′32″W | Category A | 26810 | Upload another image See more images |
| Colinton Road Merchiston Castle Now Part Of Napier University | | | | 55°56′00″N 3°12′50″W | Category A | 26828 | Upload another image |
| 16 Bath Street, 1-5 (Inclusive) Mentone Avenue | | | | 55°57′14″N 3°06′46″W | Category C(S) | 26831 | Upload Photo |
| 37 Bernard Street | | | | 55°58′33″N 3°10′07″W | Category B | 26847 | Upload Photo |
| 118 Trinity Road, Former Christchurch Episcopal Church | | | | 55°58′44″N 3°12′22″W | Category C(S) | 26850 | Upload Photo |

== Key ==
The scheme for classifying buildings in Scotland is:

- Category A: "buildings of national or international importance, either architectural or historic; or fine, little-altered examples of some particular period, style or building type."
- Category B: "buildings of regional or more than local importance; or major examples of some particular period, style or building type, which may have been altered."
- Category C: "buildings of local importance; lesser examples of any period, style, or building type, as originally constructed or moderately altered; and simple traditional buildings which group well with other listed buildings."

In March 2016 there were 47,288 listed buildings in Scotland. Of these, 8% were Category A, and 50% were Category B, with the remaining 42% being Category C.

== See also ==
- List of listed buildings in Edinburgh
