= Portobello Open Air Pool =

Pool in Portobello, Edinburgh (1936-1988)

- Interactive map of the Portobello Open Air Pool area

General information
- Coordinates: 55.9565°N 3.1177°W
- Opened: 30 May 1936
- Demolished: 11 April 1988

Portobello Open Air Pool was opened in Portobello, Edinburgh on Saturday 30 May 1936 at a cost of £90,000.

== Origins ==
Plans for an open air pool had previously been mooted by Edinburgh Town Council in 1928, 1930 and 1933, but were discounted—the main obstacles being seen as the Scottish weather and cost.

The objections on the grounds of cost were silenced when it became clear that hot water could be provided for the pool by the coal-fired Portobello Power Station nearby. It was claimed that the water would be maintained at an average temperature of 68 °F (20 °C) but at times it could be freezing.

== Pre-World War Two popularity ==
The pool could accommodate 1,300 bathers and 6,000 spectators. One of its main attractions was the wave-making machine, which at a cost of £7,000, was the first to be installed in an outdoor pool in the UK and could generate waves up to three feet high.

In its first season, 290,000 bathers and almost 500,000 spectators used the pool, bringing in receipts of £15,000.

The pool was open from May until September every year until the outbreak of World War 2 in 1939.

During the war, the pool was camouflaged to look like a field to prevent it being used as a marker for enemy bombers to target the nearby power station.

== Post war period and closure ==
It reopened on 1 June 1946. As well as being popular with swimmers and bathers, it was also regarded as one of the places to be seen, posing on the terrace. Sean Connery was a lifeguard there in the 1950s.

By the late 1970s, the pool's popularity was on the slide. Suggestions were made on how to bring in more customers from the pool-users' association:

- Heat the pool, solar heating, with water jacket or polythene blanket overnight for heat retention.
- Install trampolines.
- Convert the grass area to a putting green, tennis court or for car parking.
- Install slot machines.
- Stage open air concerts, folk singing, pipes and drum talent contests.
- Develop the pool into a Scottish Aquatic Centre.
- Open a souvenir shop
- Improve the reception area by creating a coffee lounge.
- Build a sun lounge with a directional revolving area
- Create an all the year round gymnasium
- Encourage novelty swimming - such as aquatic bingo

The advent of cheap package holidays abroad played a pivotal role in its decline and its fortunes worsened in 1978, with the closure of Portobello power station. The little heat the water had harvested before had now disappeared altogether. The 1979 season was the last before demolition was approved in 1988.
