= Robert Hamilton Paterson =

Scottish architect

Robert Hamilton Paterson (1843–1911) was a Scottish architect and partner in the architectural practice, Hamilton-Paterson and Rhind.

== Life ==
Robert Hamilton Paterson was born at 6 Earl Grey Street Edinburgh in 1843, the son of Thomas Paterson, builder (architect to the estates of the Duke of Hamilton) and his wife Margaret Instant. His older brother, John Paterson (1832–1877), also became an architect, as did his cousin Robert Paterson (1825–1889).

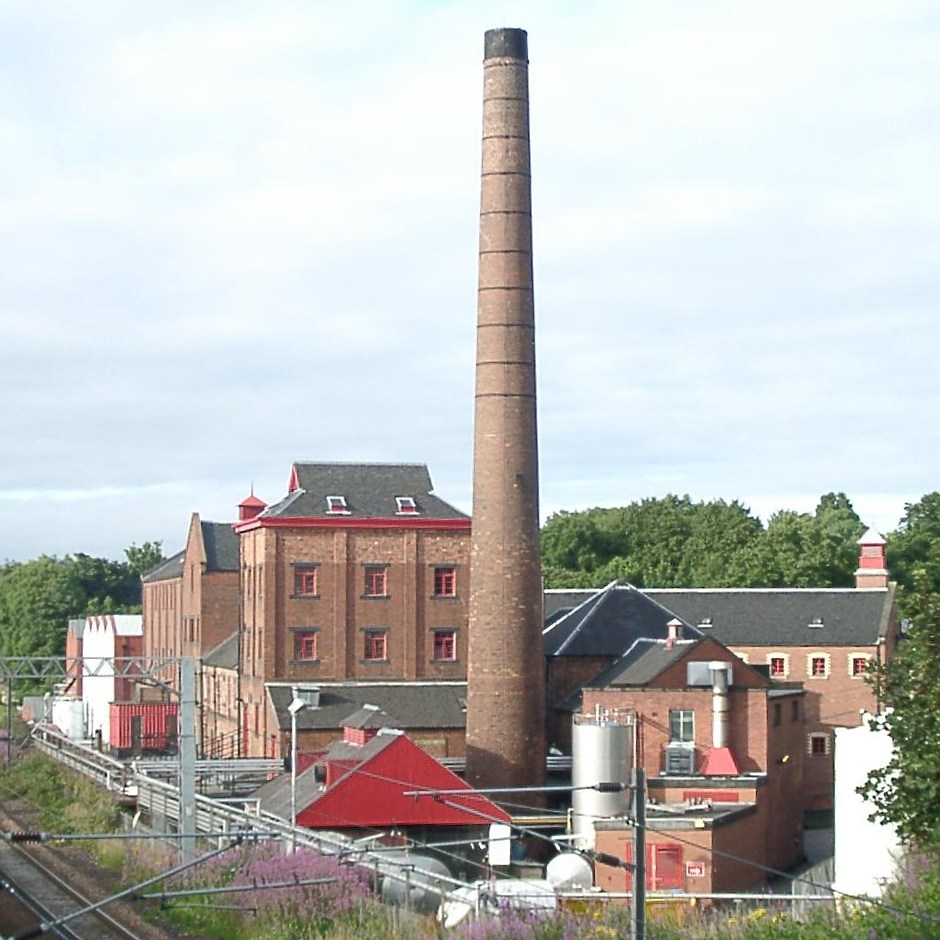
The Caledonian Brewery, Edinburgh. Reconstruction, new brewery and maltings, Robert Hamilton Paterson architect, 1892

Robert Hamilton Paterson was educated at the celebrated Hamilton Academy school and thereafter was articled to the architect James Turner’s branch (from Dublin) office at Hamilton. Paterson was then to further his experience working at Edinburgh and with the famous London firm, Cubitt & Co.

Marrying Elizabeth Cullen in Hamilton in 1870, the couple moved to Edinburgh where Paterson established his practice, executing major works for brewers, malters and warehouse-men (for which Edinburgh was a centre), including design of the Abbey, James Calder & Co., Castle, Holyrood, Drybrough’s, Caledonian and Clydesdale Breweries; and also work for McVitie and Price. He was also, for some twenty-five years, to hold the post of architect and surveyor to the Police Commissioners of the County of Lanark.

Having developed his practice, in 1898 Paterson took into partnership Thomas Duncan Rhind (1871–1927, knighted 1919), the practice being renamed Hamilton-Paterson & Rhind. The partnership was to execute important projects such as the Queen Victoria Memorial at Liverpool and the Royal Scots War Memorial in St Giles' Cathedral, Edinburgh.

This partnership was dissolved in 1905 and Paterson took into partnership his nephew Thomas Tolmie Paterson, son of his older brother John, but the partnership was short-lived due to bad times in the building sector and the increasingly ill-health of Robert Hamilton Paterson who died, aged 67, in 1911.
