= Portobello Swim Centre =

Leisure centre in Edinburgh, Scotland

Coordinates: 55.9531°N 3.1070°W

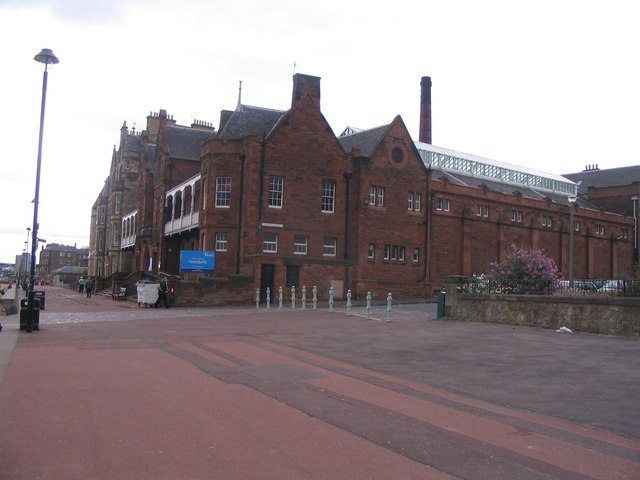
- Former names: Portobello Baths

General information
- Status: Category A listed building
- Type: Leisure
- Completed: 1898
- Owner: Edinburgh Leisure

Design and construction
- Architect: Robert Morham

Portobello Swim Centre is a multi-facility leisure venue in Portobello, Edinburgh. Built by Edinburgh City Architect Robert Morham in 1898, it comprises swimming pools, a gym and fitness studio, and Edinburgh's only authentic and publicly available Victorian Turkish bath, one of three remaining in Scotland, and one of only eleven in the whole of the UK. The salt water baths were completed in 1901.

It has been given Category A listed building status by Historic Environment Scotland.

== Refurbishments ==
In 1934, the Edinburgh Corporation modernised the facilities, installing a filtration system for the seawater pool.

In 1967, a £48,000 refurbishment saw the building's indoor pool, changing area and toilets renovated along with the installation of an illuminated ceiling and metal-cored sheeting to conceal the original Victorian balconies. The original cast iron columns were also enclosed in mosaic and their ornamental column caps wrapped in mooring rope.

In 1998, the pool opened after a £4.25 million modernisation and renovation.

In 2019, it was announced £2.5 million had been allocated to refurbish the interior of the building, create new changing rooms, upgrade fitness and gym facilities, and install energy-saving technology to make the baths more environmentally-friendly.
