= St John the Evangelist Church, Portobello =

St John's
- St John the Evangelist RC Church, Portobello, Edinburgh
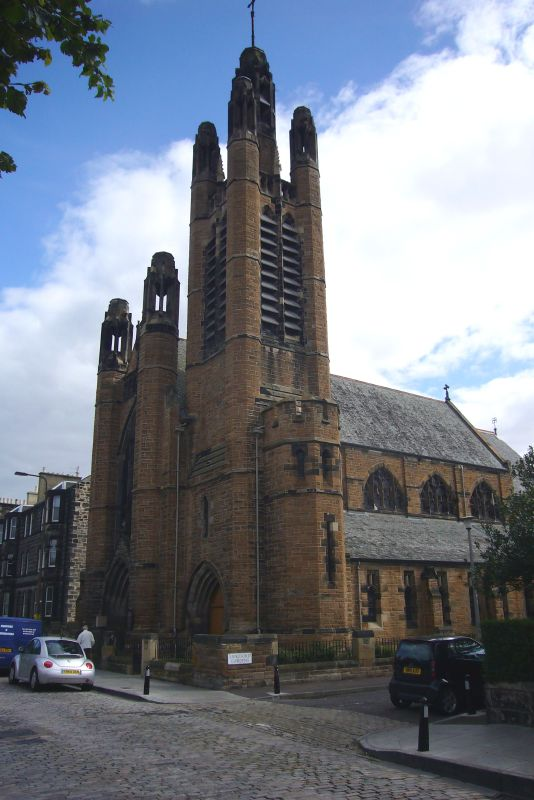
- St John's
- Denomination: Roman Catholic
- Website: St John the Evangelist Church, Portobello

History
- Dedication: St John the Evangelist

Administration
- Province: St Andrews and Edinburgh
- Archdiocese: St Andrews and Edinburgh
- Deanery: City of Edinburgh

Clergy
- Archbishop: Leo Cushley
- Priest: Fr. Jock Dalrymple

St John the Evangelist Roman Catholic Church is a Catholic parish located in the Portobello district of Edinburgh, Scotland, United Kingdom, in the Archdiocese of St Andrews and Edinburgh. Its historic church is located at the junction of Brighton Place and Sandford Gardens. Its parochial school, St. John's RC Primary School, is located at 18 Duddingston Road.

From 2017 the many parishes in Edinburgh have been organised into clusters to better coordinate their resources. St John the Evangelist is one of three parishes in Cluster 2 along with St. Mary Magdalene and St. Teresa of Lisieux.

== History ==
The church was completed in 1906. The building was designed by the architect JT Walford. The organ was rebuilt by Rushworth and Dreaper when it was moved from Hawick in 1961.

It is a Category A listed building.
