= Portobello Power Station =

Former coal-fired power station

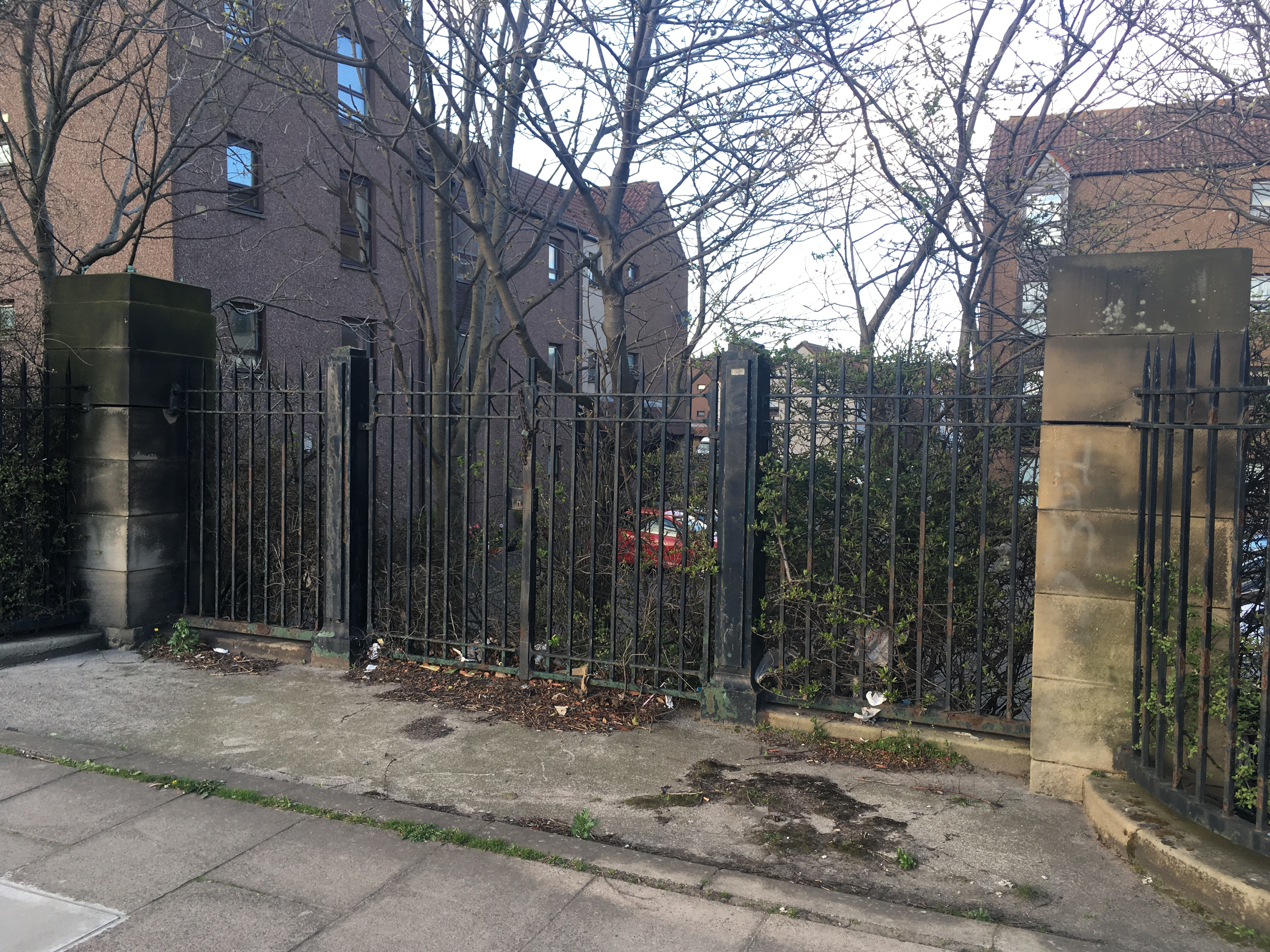
- The original gate of Portobello Power Station
- Country: Scotland
- Location: Portobello, Edinburgh
- Coordinates: 55.9562°N 3.1199°W
- Status: Decommissioned and demolished
- Commission date: 1923
- Decommission date: 1977

Thermal power station
- Primary fuel: Coal

External links
- Commons: Related media on Commons

Portobello Power Station was a coal-fired power station in Portobello, Edinburgh which was built in 1923 by the Edinburgh Corporation in order to cope with the increasing demand for electricity in the city.

== History ==
Although originally intended to be built in 1913, its construction was delayed because of the First World War, and it was formally opened by King George V 10 years later in July 1923. Its electricity was used to power Edinburgh and the surrounding region while waste heat warmed the water of Portobello Open Air Pool. At that time the turbine room contained three 12,500 kW turbines fed by six tri-drum water-tube boilers with integral superheaters and superposed economisers, each designed for a maximum continuous capacity of 80,000 lb. of steam per hour. In 1925 the plant was supplemented by a further 12,500 kW turbine. In 1927 two Brown Boveri 31,250 MW turbines were added. These were accommodated in extensions to the 1923 building and also include eight more boilers.

In 1938 the design of the station was extended by Edinburgh architect Ebenezer James MacRae; its six individual chimneys were replaced with a single 365 feet tall stack, which weighed 10,000 tons, was made up of 710,000 bricks and cost in the region of £118,000 to build.

Between 1952 and 1955, the power station achieved the highest thermal efficiency of any station in the UK, with peak output of around 279 megawatts, although an explosion in February 1953 led to a two-hour power blackout across Edinburgh. The explosion, which could be heard a mile away, was caused by sea spray collecting on high-voltage insulators in the main-grid substation.

The power station closed on 31 March 1977 and demolished in 1980; a new housing estate was built on the site. During demolition, the chimney had to be taken down brick by brick because of its proximity to nearby houses.

The Portobello coat-of-arms on the power station was rescued during demolition and it was planned to incorporate it into a new sports centre to be built in the area. This never happened and in 2016 the broken coat of arms was located in a City of Edinburgh Council storage facility in the west of Edinburgh.
