= Portobello Police Station =

Municipal building in Portobello, Scotland

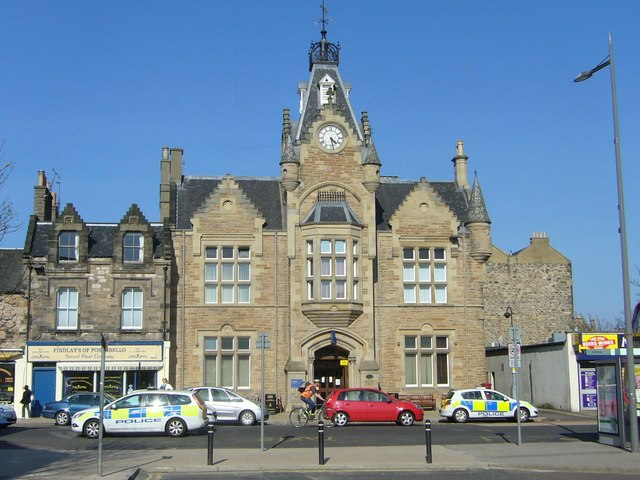
- The building in 2010

- Shown in Edinburgh
- 55.9538°N 3.1153°W
- Location: Portobello High Street, Portobello

History
- Built: 1878

Site notes
- Architect: Robert Paterson
- Architectural style: Scottish baronial style
- Owner: Action Porty

Listed Building – Category B
- Official name: 118 Portobello High Street, Police Station
- Designated: 4 September 1995
- Reference no.: LB27463

Portobello Police Station, also known as the Old Town Hall, is a former municipal building on Portobello High Street in Portobello, Scotland. The building, which was previously the meeting place of the burgh council then served as a police station. It is a Category B listed building. It was transferred into community ownership in March 2026.

== History ==
Following significant population growth, largely associated with the status of Portobello as a seaside resort, the area became a burgh in 1833. The burgh commissioners initially met at No. 1 Brighton Place and then rented various rooms in different buildings before moving to Rosefield House in Adelphi Place in 1852. After finding this arrangement unsatisfactory, the burgh leaders decided to procure a purpose-built building: the first permanent municipal building, which was designed by David Bryce and erected at 189 Portobello High Street, was completed in May 1863. (Note: The first town hall went on to be an entertainment venue and is now Portobello Baptist Church.)

The burgh leaders believed that the first building was not what they had specified, a dispute ensued, and it was not long before another building was being procured. The site they selected was at 118 Portobello High Street. The foundation stone was laid by the provost, Thomas Wood, in 1877. It was designed by Robert Paterson in the Scottish baronial style, built in rubble masonry at a cost of £5,000, and was completed in autumn 1878. The design involved a symmetrical main frontage of three bays facing onto Portobello High Street. The central bay featured a three-stage tower with an arched opening flanked by columns supporting a moulded surround in the first stage, an oriel window surmounted by brattishing in the second stage and clock faces in the third stage, all surmounted by a pyramid-shaped roof with louvres on the sides and bartizans at the corners. The outer bays were fenestrated by tri-partite windows on the ground floor and by mullioned and transomed windows on the first floor with stepped gables above. Internally, the principal room was the burgh meeting room on the first floor which featured a panelled ceiling.

The building ceased to be the local seat of government when the burgh of Portobello was annexed by the City of Edinburgh in 1896. It went on to serve as a public library but, by the late 1950s, the building was considered unfit for purpose and was criticized for being dirty, dark and overcrowded. The library service relocated to a modern building in Rosefield Place in October 1963.

The building was then converted for use as the Portobello Police Station: when Caroline Hogg went missing in 1983, it was Portobello Police Station that Caroline's mother called to report that her daughter was missing. Robert Black was subsequently arrested, tried and found guilty of her murder. It ceased to perform that role after operational police offices were withdrawn from the station October 2016. Police Scotland confirmed that it would market the building for sale in August 2024.

After Police Scotland decided to sell the building, Portobello Community Council undertook consultations in which 97% of respondents agreed with the proposal of a charity, Action Porty, taking over the building for the community. The Scottish Land Fund announced in December 2025 that they were granting £499,570 to Action Porty for the purchase of the former police station and, in January 2026, Edinburgh council gave planning permission for the proposed changes and the building was transferred into community ownership on 23 March 2026.

== See also ==
- List of listed buildings in Edinburgh/19
