= Portobello Library, Edinburgh =

Library in Edinburgh

Coordinates: 55.9534°N 3.1167°W

Portobello Library
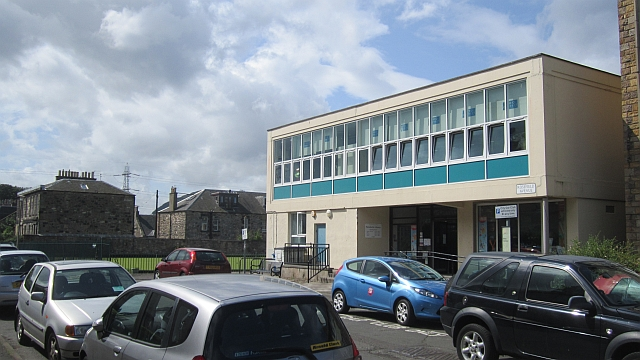
- Location: 14 Rosefield Avenue, Portobello, Edinburgh EH15 1AU, Scotland, Scotland, United Kingdom
- Type: Public library
- Established: 1897 (1963 in current location)
- Branch of: City of Edinburgh Council Libraries

Other information
- Website: https://www.edinburgh.gov.uk/directory_record/5073/portobello_library

Portobello Library is a public library in Portobello, Edinburgh, Scotland.

The current building in Rosefield Place cost £37,500 and was opened on 11 October 1963 by Lord Provost Duncan M. Weatherstone with a stock of 26,000 books and eight staff. The previous accommodation in the Old Town Hall, now Portobello Police Station, was considered unfit for purpose and was criticized for being dirty, dark and overcrowded.

Opened in 1897, the year after Portobello was formally incorporated into the City of Edinburgh, the library service is the joint-second oldest in Edinburgh (after Central Library (1890) and joint with Western (Dundee Street) Library (1897).

In 1997, Portobello Library celebrated its centenary through a programme of talks.

In June 2017, the Edinburgh Tool Library opened a lending service out of Portobello Library.

Portobello Library is one of the main venues for events at Portobello's annual book festival in October.
