= Marion Grieve =

Scottish suffragette (1848 - 1938)

- Born: c.1848
- Died: 11 October 1938

Marion Grieve (born Marion Sellers Neilson) lived during World War I and was a known Scottish suffragette. She lived in Portobello, Edinburgh. Grieve gave up being a suffragette when the war started to assist on the home front and was an active member and supporter of various charities within Portobello.

== Personal life ==
She was one of four women who visited Switzerland in 1874 in the company of Mary Taylor; she, along with Grace Hirst and Frances Richardson, climbed Mont Blanc. She illustrated the book ‘Swiss Notes by Five Ladies’ published in 1875 which described the tour. She was married to John Grieve, a coalmaster, and lived with John at Coillesdene House, Joppa.

== Campaigning for women's suffrage ==
Grieve was an active suffragette who took part in a demonstration at the House of Commons in December 1911. There is a rumour that she used to pick up stones from the local beach in Joppa and place them in her handbag to take to demonstrations.

It is not known if Grieve took part in the Edinburgh to London Suffragette March which started around 12 October 1912; however it is said that those who disbanded the March stayed at her home, Coillesdene House, Joppa.

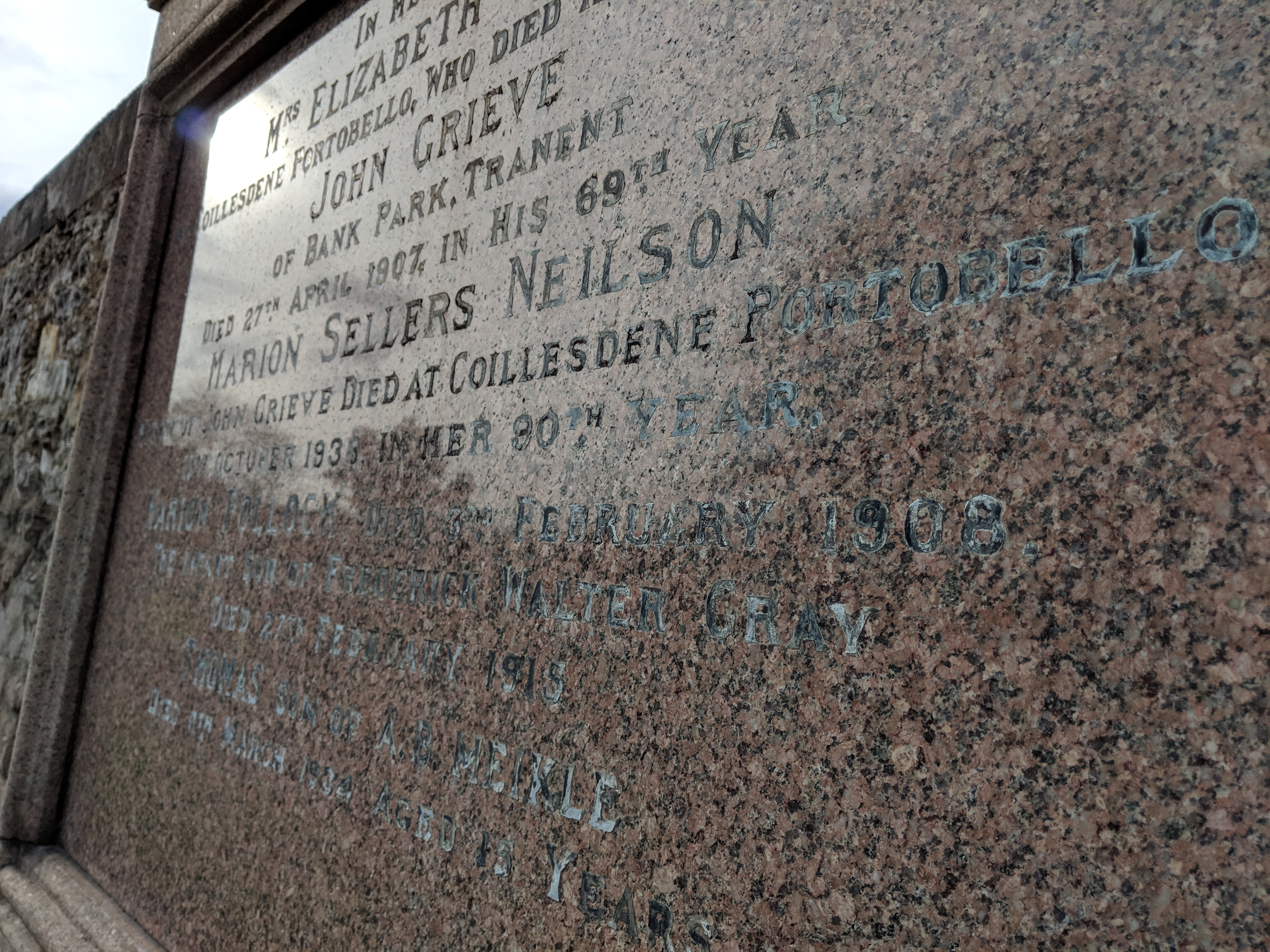
Marion Greive's Headstone - Portobello Cemetery

== Death and legacy ==
Grieve died a widow on 11 October 1938 at her home, Coillesdene House, Joppa at the age 90. Her funeral took place at Portobello Cemetery, Edinburgh on Friday 14 October 1938. An Executry Notice for Marion's estate appeared in the paper on Saturday 22 October 1938.

== See also ==
- Suffragette
- Women's suffrage in the United Kingdom
