= Bellfield (community centre) =

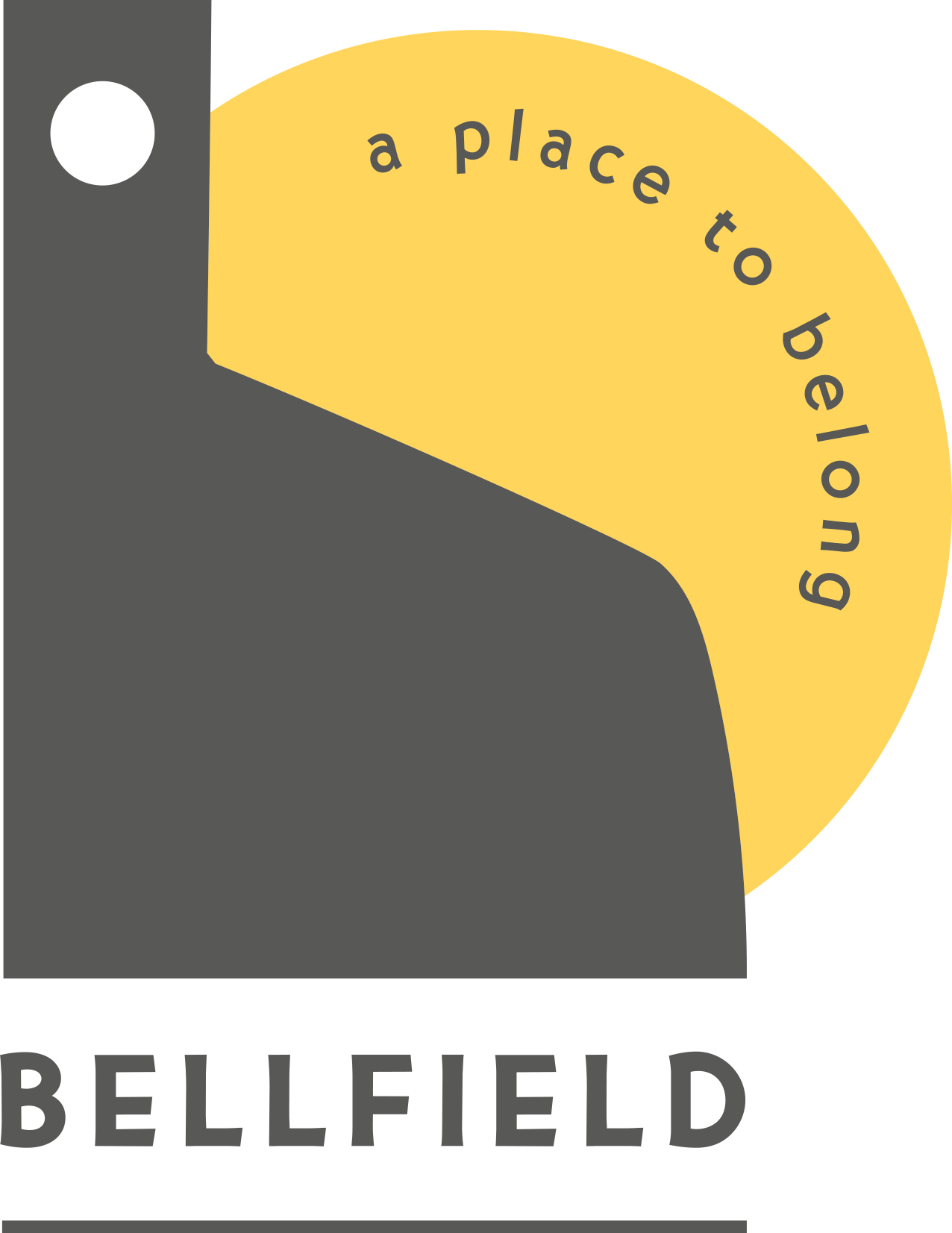
- Interactive map of the Bellfield area
- Former names: Portobello Old Parish Church

General information
- Location: Bellfield Street, Portobello, Edinburgh
- Coordinates: 55°57′08″N 3°06′31″W
- Completed: 1810
- Opened: 23 June 2018 (as community centre)

Design and construction
- Architect: William Sibbald

Website
- https://www.bellfield.scot/

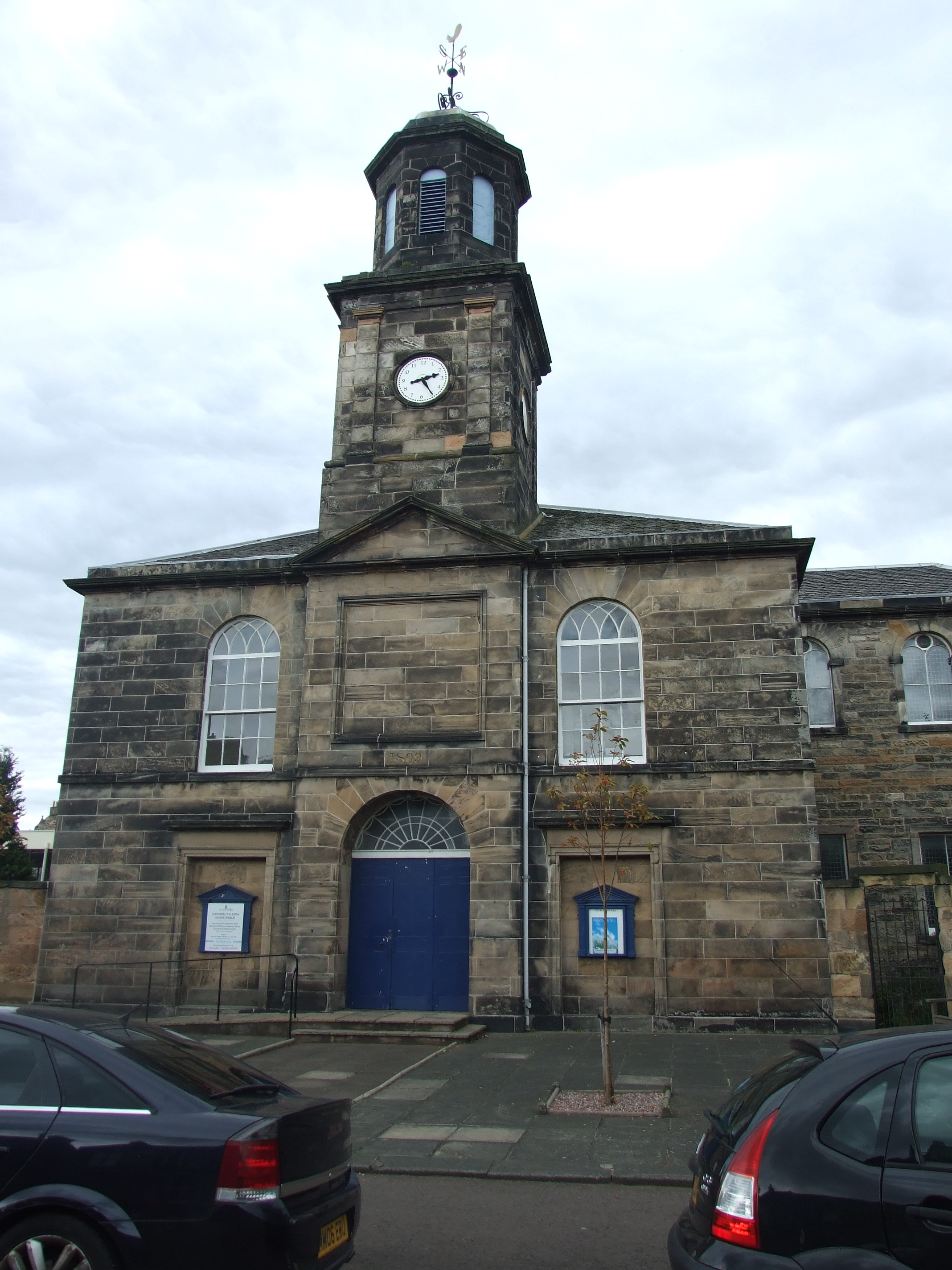
Bellfield (2014)

Bellfield is a community centre located in what was previously Portobello Old Parish Church, a Georgian church of classical design located in Bellfield (formerly Melville) Street, Portobello, Edinburgh, Scotland. The church was the subject of a successful community buy-out in 2017, and reopened as a community centre on 23 June 2018. Dated 1809, it was built between 1808 and 1810 to a design by William Sibbald, at a cost of £2650. It was enlarged in 1815 and 1878.

== Community buyout ==
Residents in Portobello were asked to back the first urban community buy-out under new Scottish Government legislation. The Save Bellfield campaign was set up to take over the church and halls of the former Portobello Old Parish Church in Bellfield Street. Supporters included artists and performers resident in the area, including Downton Abbey actor Cal MacAninch. The Friends of Bellfield aimed to provide a continuing home for a wide range of groups which have been based in the building as well as developing it for other community activities.

The campaigners had asked the Church of Scotland to delay putting the building on the market to allow them more time to raise the funds for the buy-out, but the church’s General Trustees turned down the request. Portobello Old Parish Church and St James Church in Rosefield Place have both been merged with St Philip’s, Joppa, to become Portobello and Joppa Parish Church in the St Philip’s building.

The community buyout was undertaken by Action Porty (a charity and community benefit society) which runs the building. Many local businesses use the facilities, including the Edinburgh Youth Theatre company.

== 2017 funding award ==
In 2017 the project was awarded £600,000 from the Scottish Land Fund, which allowed Save Bellfield to purchase the building
