= Portobello, Edinburgh =

Coastal suburb of Edinburgh, Scotland

Coordinates: 55.953°N 3.114°W

Portobello
- An aerial view of Portobello Beach
- Location within the City of Edinburgh council area Location within Scotland
- OS grid reference: NT304738
- Community council: Portobello
- Council area: City of Edinburgh
- Lieutenancy area: Edinburgh
- Country: Scotland
- Sovereign state: United Kingdom
- Post town: EDINBURGH
- Postcode district: EH15
- Dialling code: 0131
- Police: Scotland
- Fire: Scottish
- Ambulance: Scottish
- UK Parliament: Edinburgh East
- Scottish Parliament: Edinburgh Eastern, Musselburgh and Tranent

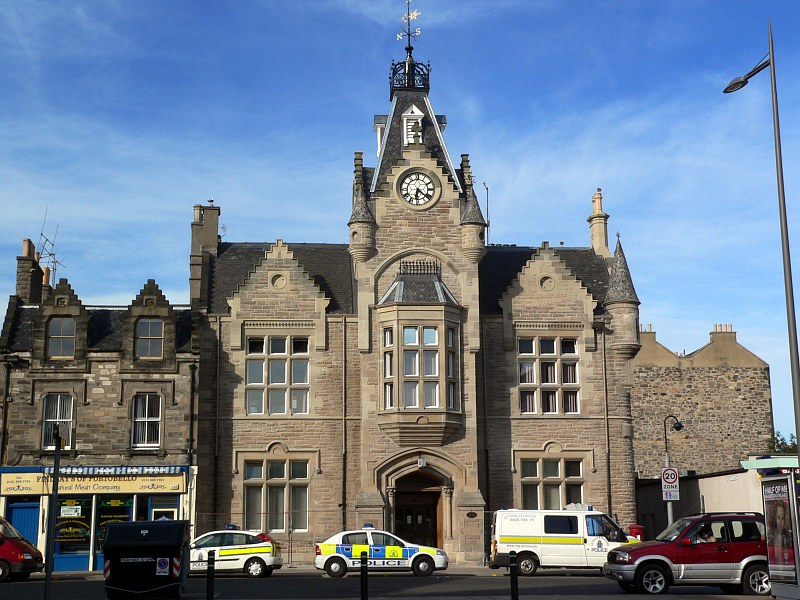
Portobello Police Station, by Robert Paterson built as Portobello Town Hall in 1878 and later used as the Police Station

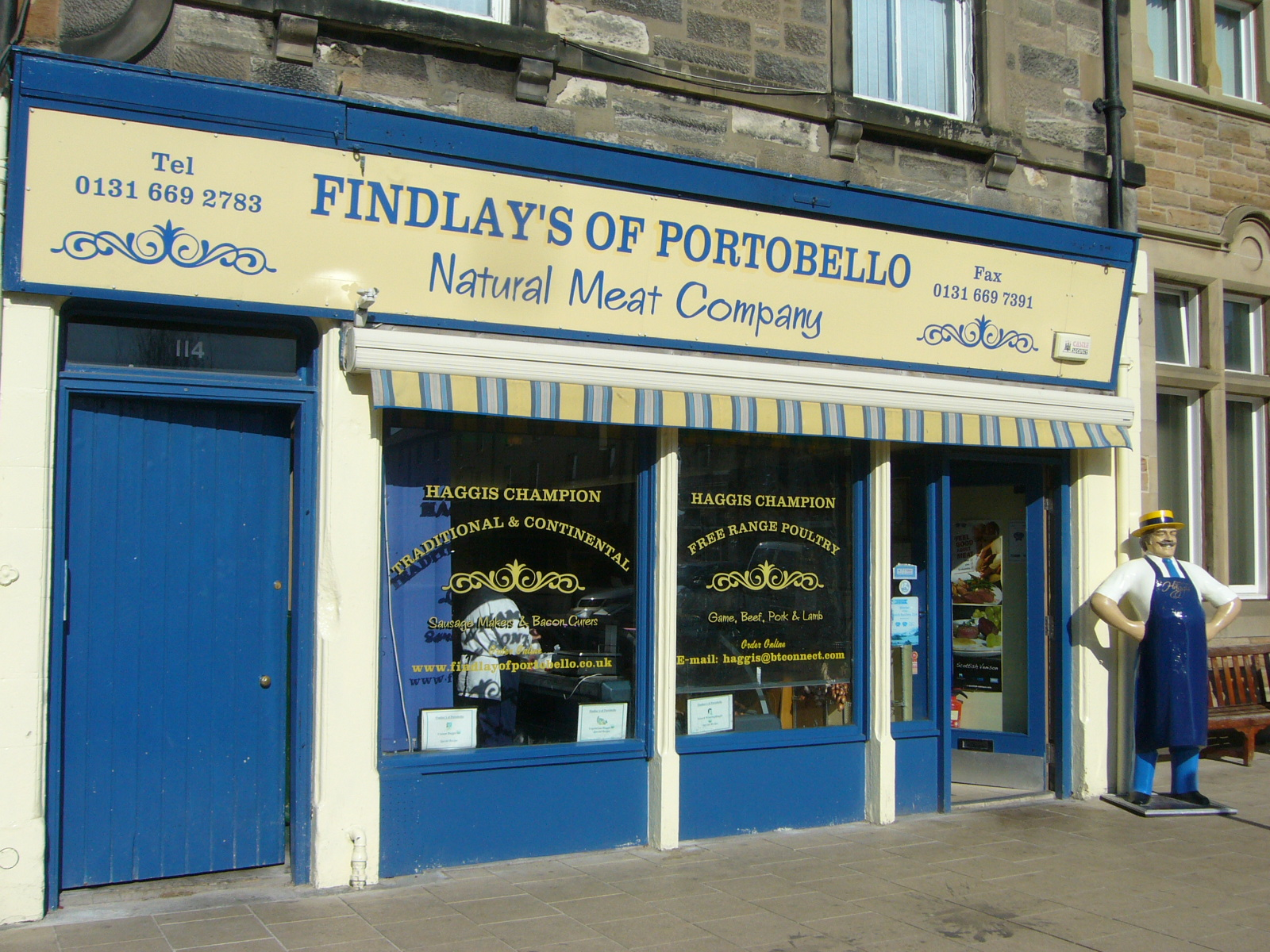
Butcher's shop in the High Street

Portobello is a coastal suburb of Edinburgh in eastern central Scotland. It lies 3 miles (5 km) east of the city centre, facing the Firth of Forth, between the suburbs of Joppa and Craigentinny. Although historically it was a town in its own right, it is officially a residential suburb of Edinburgh. The promenade fronts onto a wide sandy beach.

== History ==
=== Early years ===
The area was originally known as Figgate Muir, an expanse of moorland through which the Figgate Burn flowed, from Duddingston Loch fed by the Braid Burn to the west, to the sea, with a broad sandy beach on the Firth of Forth. The name "Figgate" has been thought to come from an Anglian term for "cow's ditch", but the land was used as pasture for cattle by the monks of Holyrood Abbey and the name is more likely to mean "cow road", as in Cowgate in Edinburgh. In 1650 it was the supposed scene of a secret meeting between Oliver Cromwell and Scottish leaders. A report from 1661 describes a race in which twelve browster-wives ran from the Burn (recorded as the Thicket Burn) to the top of Arthur's Seat.

=== 18th century ===
By the 18th century, the area was frequented by sailors and smugglers. A cottage was built in 1742 on what is now the High Street (close to the junction with Brighton Place) by a Scottish sailor named George Hamilton, who had served in the Royal Navy under Admiral Edward Vernon in the Battle of Porto Bello in 1739; Hamilton named the cottage Portobello Hut in honour of the British victory. By 1753 there were other houses around it. The cottage remained intact until 1851, when it became a hostelry for travellers known as the Shepherd's Ha.

In 1763 the lands known as the Figgate Whins were sold by Lord Milton to Baron Mure for about £1,500. They were afterwards feued out by the latter to William Jameson or Jamieson at the rate of £3 per acre. Jameson discovered a valuable bed of clay near the burn, and built a brick and tile works beside the stream. He later built an earthenware pottery factory, and the local population grew into a thriving village. Land values subsequently rose, and by the beginning of the 19th century some parts had been sold at a yearly feu duty of £40 per annum per acre.

An advertisement for bathing machines for hire on Portobello beach appeared in the Edinburgh Evening Courant of 11 June 1795, according to a report in the Evening Dispatch. It says the bathing machines have steady horses and careful drivers, and the bathing sands are perfectly free from stones and "danders", the water clear and the beach very retired.

=== 19th century ===
Portobello Sands were used at that time by the Edinburgh Light Horse for drill practice. Walter Scott was their quartermaster. While riding in a charge in 1802 he was kicked by a horse and confined to his lodgings for three days. While recovering he finished The Lay of the Last Minstrel. The Scots Magazine in 1806 noted that the lands were "a perfect waste covered almost entirely with whins or furze". Portobello grew into a bathing resort, and in 1807 new salt-water baths at the foot of Bath Street and Regent Street were erected at a cost of £5,000. In 1822, a visit of King George IV to Scotland organised by Scott included a review of troops and Highlanders held on the sands, with spectators crowding the dunes.

The population in 1841 was 3,479.

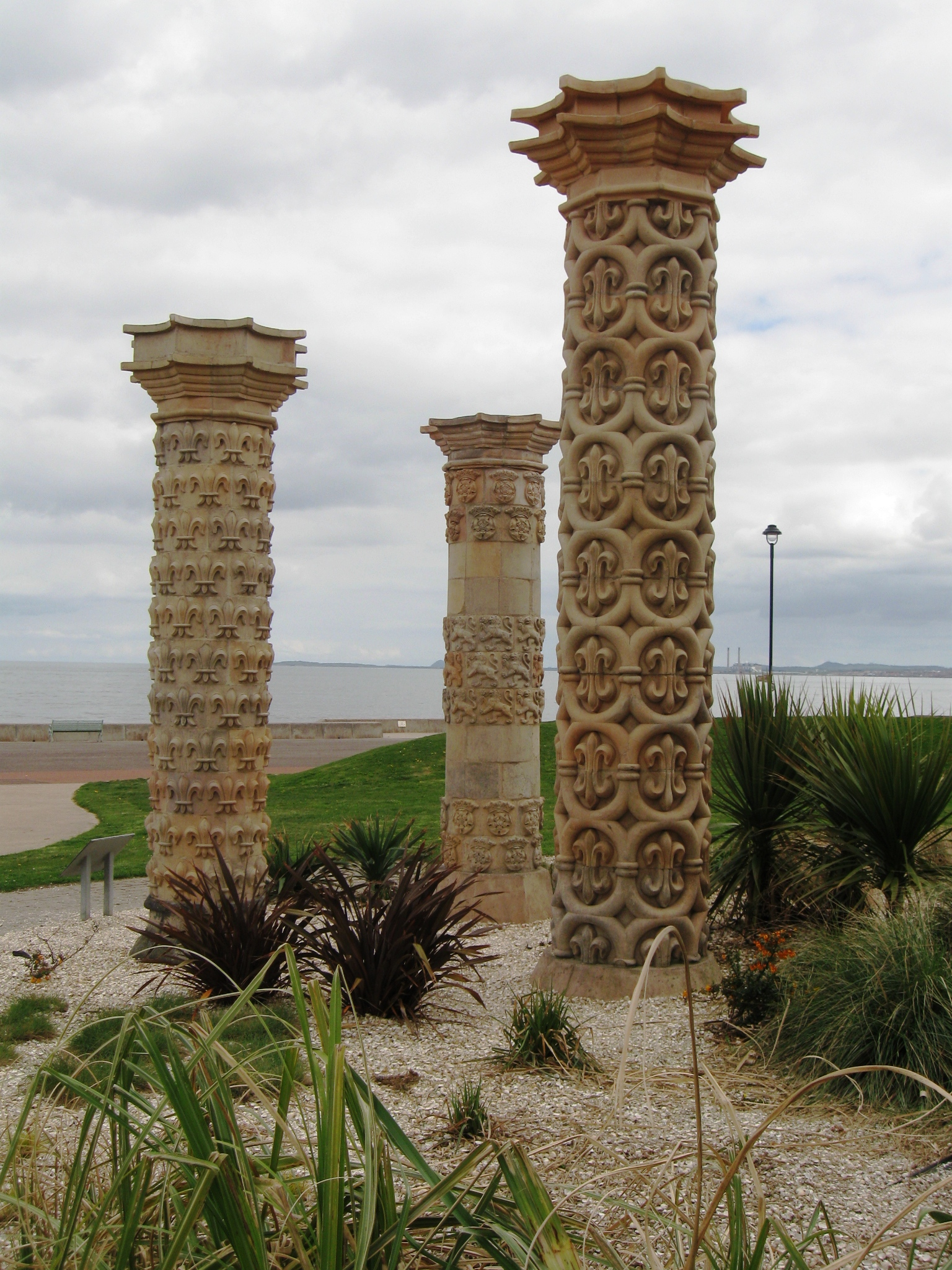
Three pillars in Coade stone from a local garden, re-erected on Portobello Promenade

Before Portobello had a promenade and public beach, there was only a belt of dry sand between the firmer sand of the beach and the private properties adjoining the shore. Access to the beach was restricted by these property holders, as Sir William Rae discovered in 1842 when he tried to gain access to his favourite section for bathing. The proprietor of a villa adjoining the shore had extended his garden to include the sand and had built a wall leading right down to the sea. Sir William, a former Lord Advocate, viewed this as interfering with his right of way, as a private citizen and as an officer of the Crown. After legal action over several years and an appeal right up to the House of Lords, the proprietor and his neighbours were forced in July 1849 to demolish the walls they had erected. Fifteen years later, Portobello Town Council began to build the Promenade, so securing public access to the beach along its two miles (three kilometres).

Portobello became industrialized in the 19th century, manufacturing bricks ("Portobello brick"), glass, lead, paper, pottery, soap and mustard. Joppa to the east was important as a salt producer.

In 1833 the town was made a burgh, and jointly with Leith and Musselburgh, it was represented by one member of Parliament. Then in 1896 Portobello was incorporated into Edinburgh by the Edinburgh Extension Act 1896 (59 & 60 Vict. c. cciii). The Scotsman in 1912 noted that:

"It was by the provisions of the Edinburgh Extension Act of 1896 under which Portobello was amalgamated with the city, that Edinburgh gave an undertaking to build and maintain the town hall in Portobello, and in February of this year the Corporation decided to implement the bargain".

A formidable red-brick power station was built in 1923 at the west end of the beach. It was extended by Ebenezer James MacRae in 1938, and operated until 1977 when it was closed. It was demolished in the following 18 months.

Between 1846 and 1964 a railway station provided access for visitors to the resort, whose facilities came to include a large open-air swimming pool, heated by waste from the power station. The actor Sean Connery once worked there as a lifeguard. The pool was closed in 1979. There was also a lido (now demolished) and a permanent funfair, which closed in 2007 and was also eventually demolished to make way for new housing.

=== 20th century ===
Portobello Baths were constructed in 1898 and completed in 1901 on The Promenade overlooking the beach. These, now known as Portobello Swim Centre, include one of only three remaining Victorian Turkish baths in Scotland. (Note: The other two are only open to the members and guests of two baths clubs, the Arlington and the Western.)

Portobello Pier was a pleasure pier near the end of Bath Street, open from 23 May 1871 until the start of the First World War. At 1,250 feet (381 m) long with a restaurant and observatory at the end, it cost £7,000 to build to a design by Sir Thomas Bouch, who was infamously linked to the Tay Bridge disaster. The iron supports rusted away and the pier was demolished as uneconomic to repair in 1917.

The Edinburgh Marine Gardens laid out north of Kings Road in 1908–1909 included an open-air theatre, an industrial hall, a ballroom (later a skating rink), a scenic railway, a "rustic mill and water-wheel" and a speedway track. It fell out of use in the First World War and never recovered, although the speedway/motor cycle track remained in use until the outbreak of the Second World War in 1939. The site was cleared in 1966 for the Lothian Buses Marine bus depot.

In 1983 Portobello was at the centre of police and media attention with the abduction of five-year-old Caroline Hogg from the Promenade area and her murder by Robert Black.

Portobello's peak as a resort in the late 19th century gave way to slow decline through the 20th century. Whilst visitors were mainly from Edinburgh, it was also once popular with Glaswegians, particularly as the Glasgow Fair "trade holiday" signalled the start of a two-week holiday for the west of Scotland. By the 1960s, it had become an area of amusement arcades and permanent funfair attractions. From the 1980s these gradually disappeared, and by the end of the 20th century the Promenade had hardly any attractions specific to a seaside location, although the Tower Amusements arcade remains in business.

=== 21st century ===
The 21st century has seen the emergence of community activities, some focused on the Promenade. The beach hosts regular beach volleyball, including Olympic beach-volleyball qualifiers, and the annual Big Beach Busk event. Other community activities focus more on the sea. They include the Portobello, Sailing, Kayaking and Rowing Club, Rowporty, and Eastern Amateur Coastal Rowing Club. Others concern community gardens, a monthly local food market a youth theatre (now using a new web address), and culture and music. Artistic activity has become popular, including the annual Art Walk Porty. In April 2020 the Portobello Pencil Sharpening Project, thought to be an art installation, went viral on Twitter.

In 2019 Portobello was voted the best neighbourhood in the UK at the 2020 Urbanism Awards. In 2021 it was considered by a Sunday Times panel to be one of the top eight places to live in Scotland.

The Scottish Environment Protection Agency (SEPA) classed the quality of the swimming water as "sufficient" in its 2019 survey, a small improvement on the previous year, when dolphins were sighted off the coast. In 2020 there was a sighting of what was thought to be a swordfish. A wild swimmers' club has been braving the waves through the year since 2010. Meanwhile, a warmer alternative is provided by the Turkish Baths in Portobello Swim Centre.

In October 2016 Portobello became the first urban community in Scotland to register a Community Right to Buy after the 2016 expansion of Land reform in Scotland to cover urban areas. Purchase of Bellfield Old Parish Church and Halls by Action Porty for £600,000 was confirmed by Scottish Government Ministers on 3 May 2017. The purchase was funded partly by the Scottish Land Fund and partly by community donations and borrowing. The buildings and grounds formally passed from the Church of Scotland to Action Porty on 6 September 2017 and opened as Bellfield (Community Centre), Portobello on 23 June 2018.

== Transport ==
=== Buses ===
Portobello is served by Lothian Buses which provide eleven services to the area, continuing towards Joppa and Eastfield to Musselburgh, Port Seton, Tranent or North Berwick, down Brighton Place to Fort Kinnaird or Royal Infirmary, and from Kings Road to Craigentinny. The former electric tramways operated by Edinburgh Corporation Transport Department were replaced by diesel buses in November 1956.

=== Railway ===
Portobello's first railway station was initially served by the Edinburgh and Dalkeith Railway. The Portobello (E&DR) railway station operated from 1832 until 1846, when it was replaced by the Portobello (NBR) railway station operated by the North British Railway. The station closed in 1964 under the Beeching cuts.

=== Hovercraft ===
For two weeks in 2007 there was an experimental hovercraft service to Kirkcaldy in Fife. Stagecoach was interested in running a regular service, but the local authority refused planning permission for the infrastructure. Stagecoach planned to use a terminal to be built in Leith using public funds, which failed to materialise.

== Sport ==
The Promenade and beach host two annual four-mile (6.4-kilometre) running races: Portobello Beach Race every summer since 2013, and the Promathom most New Year's Days since 1987. A weekly five-kilometre (3 mi 188 yd) Park Run every Saturday in Figgate Park provoked press-reported controversy and exhibitionism in 2018.

== Town halls ==
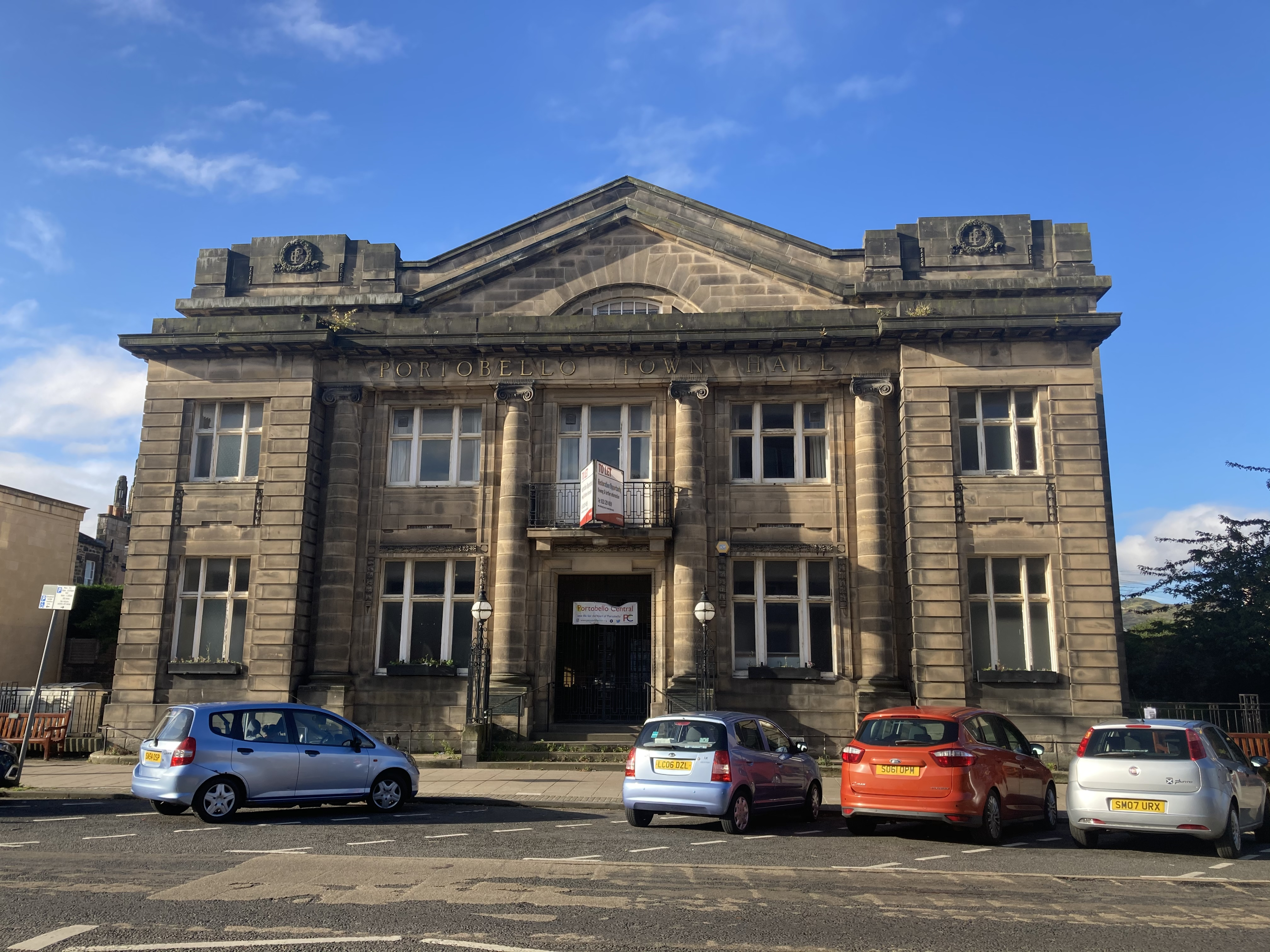
Portobello Town Hall, September 2020

As an independent burgh, Portobello had aspirations for a town hall, the town council having first met in rooms in Brighton Place and then in Rosefield House. The first purpose-built hall (now the Baptist Church in the High Street) was designed by David Bryce and erected in 1862. This proved inadequate for the purpose and was replaced in 1877 by a building designed by Robert Paterson, which is now Portobello Police Station.

The Edinburgh Extension Act 1895, which amalgamated Portobello with Edinburgh, gave effect to a number of undertakings, including extension of the Promenade, building of the Baths, surfacing various streets, providing drainage, extending the trams, providing a public park and a new town hall for public meetings. The new Portobello Town Hall was intended to hold at least 800 people and was built on the site of Inverey House to a design by the City Architect, James A. Williamson, opening in 1914.

In June 2019, the town hall was closed by the city council after the masonry and plasterwork were found to be in poor condition. The city council put the building on the market for lease in February 2020, and, following a competitive process, it agreed to enter into exclusive talks with a local community organisation known as Portobello Central in May 2021. The city council confirmed, in June 2021, that it had allocated £350,000 of capital investment to the town hall project, money provided by the Scottish Government under its Place Based Investment Programme. Portobello Central indicated that it hoped the funding would enable it to re-open the building by April 2022. The Town Hall opened for business on 1 June 2023, under a 25-year, full repairing lease from the City of Edinburgh Council at £1 per year rent.

== Notable people ==
In birth order:

- Alexander Laing (1752–1823), architect based in Portobello, where he died
- The Misses Corbett, Grace (c. 1765/1770–1843) and Walterina (died 1837), poets and authors from Portobello
- Dr David Laing (1792–1878), librarian to the Signet Library and noted archaeologist, lived at 12 James Street
- Mackintosh MacKay (1793–1873), compiler of a Gaelic dictionary and Moderator of the General Assembly of the Free Church of Scotland, died in Portobello
- Rear Admiral Thomas Fraser (1796–1870), hero of the First Anglo-Burmese War
- Hugh Miller (1802–1856), a founding father of geology, lived in the tower in Tower Street.
- Alan Stevenson (1806–1865), lighthouse engineer, lived his final years at 13 Pittville St, then called Pitt St
- Stevenson Macadam (1829–1901), scientist and author, lived much of his life in East Brighton Crescent, Portobello
- William Durham (1834–1893), chemist, papermaker and astronomer, lived and died at 16 Straiton Place
- Lucy Bethia Walford, née Colquhoun (1845–1915), novelist, was born in Portobello
- James Graham Fairley (1846–1934) architect, lived at 47 Abercorn Terrace.
- Marion Grieve (1848–1938), suffragette, lived at Coillesdene House, Joppa
- William Ivison Macadam (1856–1902), chemist and antiquarian, spent his childhood in Portobello.
- Helen Hopekirk (1856–1945), composer, pianist and teacher, lived at 148 High Street, Portobello from 1856 to 1868 and is commemorated by a blue plaque
- Alexander Philip (1858–1932), a lawyer born in Portobello, became a campaigner for calendar reform
- William Robertson (1865–1949), recipient of the Victoria Cross, lived at 21 Lee Crescent.
- Harry Lauder (1870–1950), music hall entertainer, was born at 3 Bridge Street. Although he and his family left the town within weeks of his birth, a Harry Lauder memorial garden was opened in 1970 in the grounds of the Town Hall built in 1912 and designed by architect James A Williamson.) Portobello's main bypass is named Sir Harry Lauder Road.
- William Russell Flint (1880–1969), painter, lived at 9 Rosefield Place.
- Alexander Heron (1884–1971), a member of 1921 British Mount Everest reconnaissance expedition and Director of the Geological Survey of India (1936–39), lived in Hamilton Terrace in 1900–1911.
- Madge Elder (1893-1985), born in Portobello, is a noted gardener and writer.
- Ned Barnie (1896–1983), born in Portobello, became in 1950 the first Scot to swim the English Channel.
- Norrie Haywood (1910–1979), born in Portobello, became a professional footballer and football manager.
- James Rankin (1913–1975), born in Portobello, was a RAF fighter pilot in the Second World War.
- Johnny Cunningham (1957–2003), Celtic fiddle virtuoso, was born in Portobello.
- Gail Porter (born 1971), TV presenter, grew up here, attending Portobello High School.
- Ewen Bremner (born 1972), born in Portobello, is a noted film and TV actor.
- Iron Virgin (1970s), glam punk rock band
- The Valves (1977), punk band from Portobello
- Shauna Macdonald (born 1981), actress, grew up in Portobello.
- Emun Elliott (born 1983), actor

== Notable buildings ==
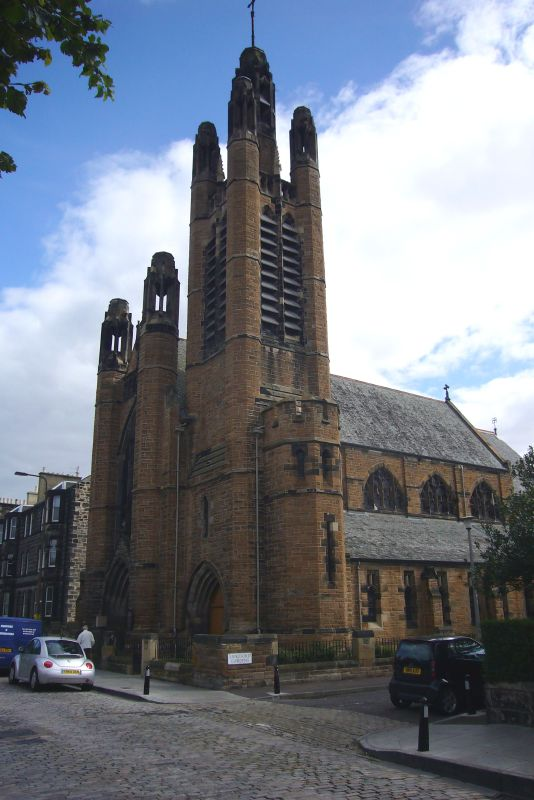
St John the Evangelist RC Church, Portobello

=== Extant ===
- St John the Evangelist RC Church, Portobello
- Bellfield Community Centre (previously Bellfield Church)
- George Cinema
- Portobello Library
- Portobello Swim Centre

=== Demolished ===
- Portobello Open Air Pool
- Portobello Power Station
- Portobello Marine Gardens
- Portobello Railway Station

=== Portobello Parish Church ===
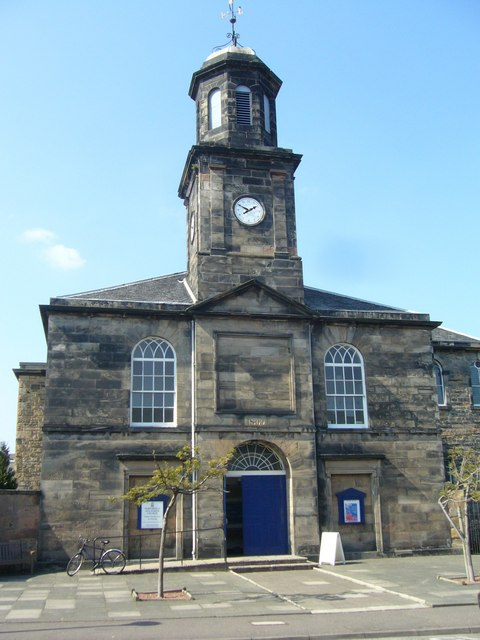
Portobello Parish Kirk, Bellfield Street

The building was designed by William Sibbald and the foundation stone was laid on 27 October 1808 with the church opening for worship in 1810. It originally had the status of Chapel of Ease for Duddingston Parish Church to the west. In May 1834 the General Assembly of the Church of Scotland gave it the status of a quoad sacra church. It received full independent parish status in 1861.

The church hall, built in 1964, stands on the former graveyard, but several stones survive, for instance in the narrow gap behind the back of the hall and the boundary.

In 2017 the church was sold by the Church of Scotland to the local community and reopened in 2018 as Bellfield community centre.

== See also ==
- For Portobello Cemetery, see Eastfield, Edinburgh.
- Portobello RFC
- Portobello Toddler Hut
