= Portobello Toddler Hut =

Preschool in Edinburgh, Scotland

Location
- 28 Beach Lane, Portobello, Edinburgh, Scotland; United Kingdom; 55°57′19″N 3°06′45″W

Information
- Type: Nursery school; Montessori
- Established: 1929; 97 years ago
- Founder: Dame Harriet Findlay DBE
- Gender: Co-educational
- Age range: 2.5 – 5 years
- Enrolment: 40 children
- Website: portobellotoddlershut.org.uk

Portobello Toddler Hut is an early pioneer nursery school in Portobello, Edinburgh, Scotland, founded in 1929. The school was officially opened on 14 November 1931 by Dame Harriet Findlay DBE, on "an appallingly wet day".

== Overview ==
When opened it catered for 40 children from 2 to 5 years of age. Starting at 10am, the older children returned home at midday and the younger ones stayed and had a meal and an afternoon sleep. It was run by a committee of ladies on a voluntary basis. The Education Committee of Edinburgh gave a grant to cover about a third of the costs, with the remaining money subscribed "so that bread-winning mothers may be relieved of the care of their children during the busy part of the day". Montessori methods were used to prepare the toddlers for more formal education. As well as a nursery, the Hut was used for many years as a shelter for children lost on the beach during the summer holidays.

The Toddler Hut is operates from Beach Lane, Portobello, and is the oldest community run, self funded childcare facility in the United Kingdom. In 2012, plans were announced to expand the nursery school and replace ageing facilities. During the COVID-19 pandemic, a fundraising campaign enabled the Hut to remain open.
