= Robert Paterson (Scottish architect) =

Scottish architect

- Born: 1825; Edinburgh, Scotland
- Died: 1889; Edinburgh, Scotland
- Occupation: Architect
- Notable work: Cafe Royal

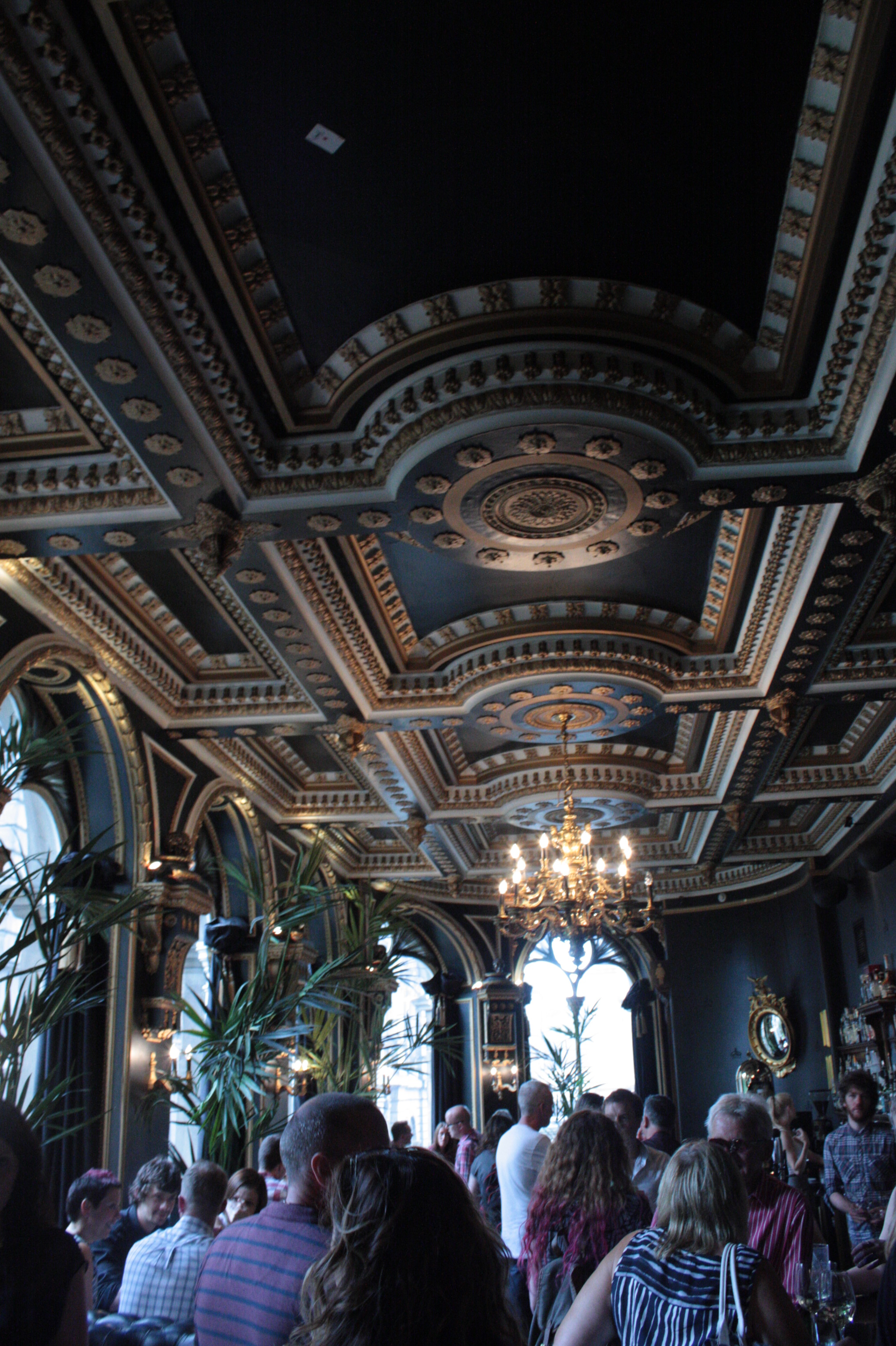
Interior of first floor bar, Cafe Royal, Edinburgh

Robert Paterson (1825–1889) was a 19th-century Scottish architect. His most famous work is the Cafe Royal in Edinburgh. Almost all his works are in Edinburgh, mainly in the Scots Baronial style, including a number of churches for the United Presbyterian Church.

== Life ==
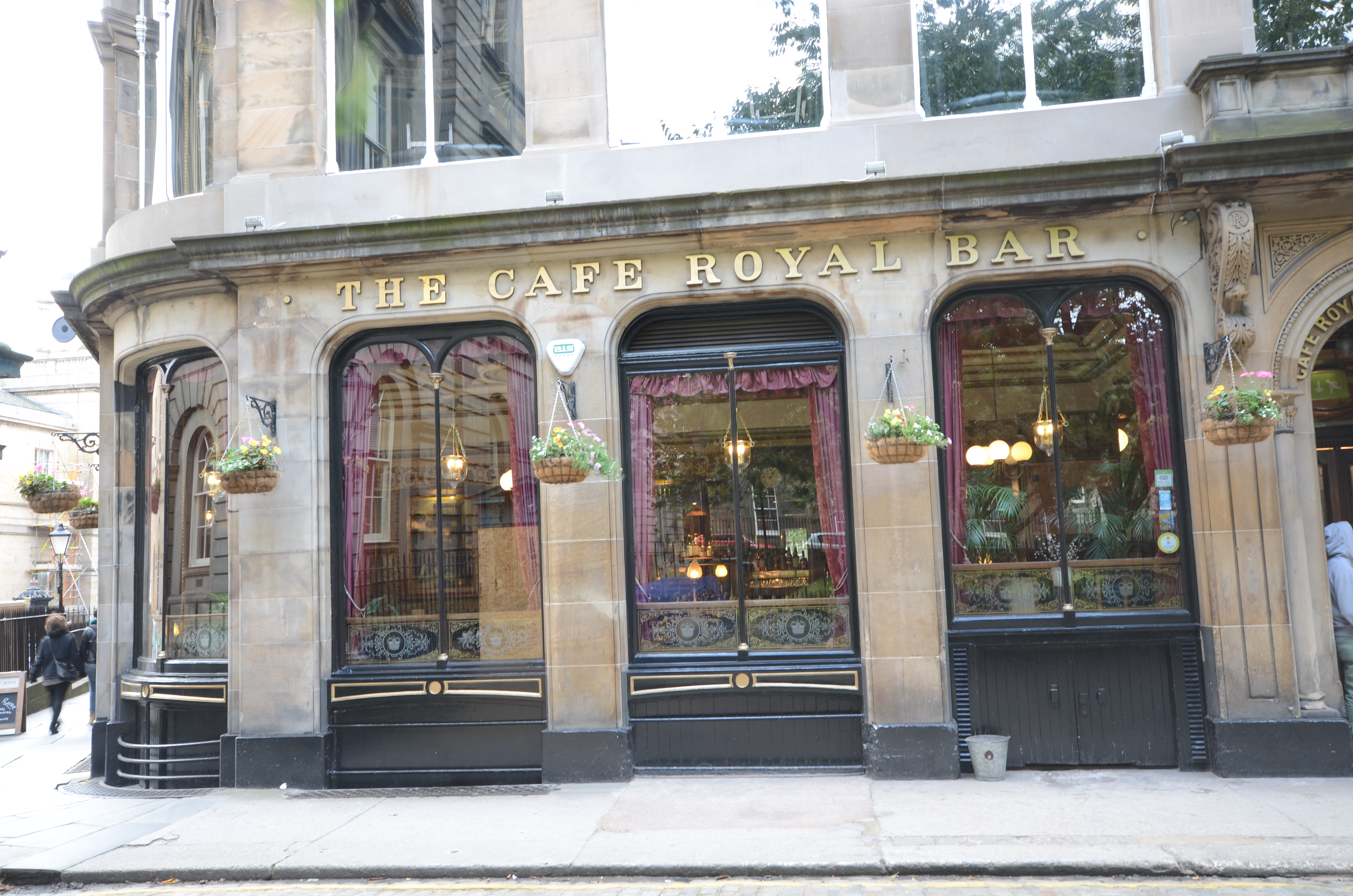
Cafe Royal Bar

He was born at 13 Richmond Place in south Edinburgh the son of Robert Paterson (1790–1846), a builder, architect and surveyor in Edinburgh, and his wife Margaret (1789–1867).

In 1839/40 he was articled to George Beattie (born 1810) (father of William Hamilton Beattie builders and wood merchants at 23 Bread Street. His family was then living at 138 Causewayside. From 1850 he was living at practising from Madeira Cottage at 187 Causewayside, close to his family home.

From 1860 onwards he had offices at 6 Hanover Street in Edinburgh's First New Town, moving to 10 Hanover Street around 1870, and is later described as both architect and city assessor (valuing property under the Valuation of Lands Act).

He was Session Clerk to the United Presbyterian Church in Newington.

He died at 47 Grange Road on 5 October 1889 and is buried nearby in the Grange Cemetery.

== Works ==
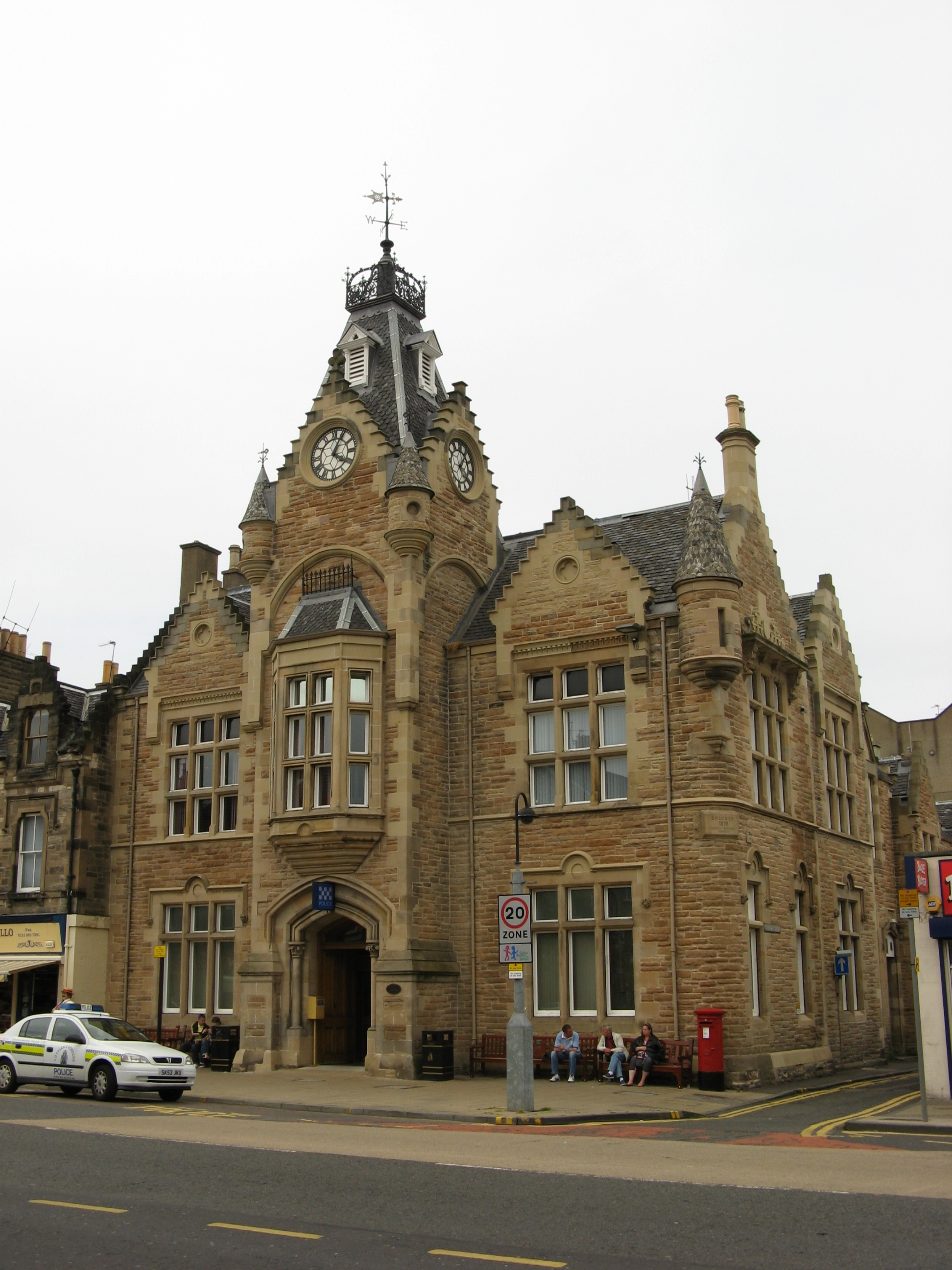
Portobello Police Station

see

- 97-103 High Street on the Royal Mile (1862) incorporating the sculpted head of a boy by John Rhind
- Cafe Royal, Edinburgh (1863)
- Morningside United Presbyterian Church (1864)
- Newington United Presbyterian Church (1864) Grange Road/Causewayside (generally called Salisbury Church)
- Saltcoats West UP Church (1866)
- West wing, Edinburgh Royal lunatic asylum (1867)
- Canongate UP Church (1869)
- Southern Literary Institute (1870)
- Tenement in Leith (1873) Great Junction Street?
- Enlargement of Hamilton Prison (1876)
- Portobello Cemetery and entrance lodge (1876)
- Portobello Police Station (1877)
- Tenement in Portobello (1877)
- Canongate Christian Institute (1878)
- Tenements, Queen Charlotte Street, Leith (1878)
- Windsor Hotel, 100 Princes Street (1878)
- Villa, 6 Strathearn Road (1880) extension and alteration
- 6 to 8 Shandwick Place (1880)
- Tenement 147-151 Warrender Park Road (1881)
- Tenement Leslie Place/Carlton Street, Canonmills (1881)
- Villa, 5 Chalmers Crescent for Thomas Landale (1884)
- Villa, 59 Dick Place (1885)
- Shop, 130 Princes Street (1886)
- Warrender Baths (1886)

== Family ==
In 1848 he married Margaret Wyllie. Their eldest son Robert (born 1850) was also an architect.

He was cousin to the architect Robert Hamilton Paterson.
