= John Macadam =

Australian politician (1827–1865)

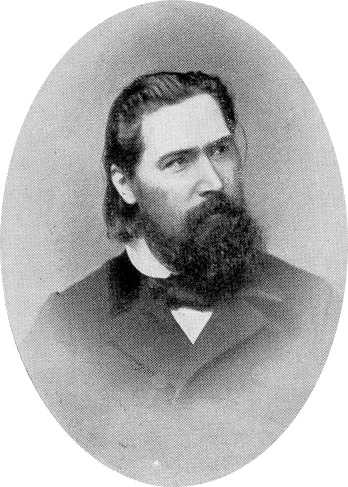
- Born: 29 May 1827
- Died: 2 September 1865 (aged 38)
- Occupations: Scientist, medical doctor, analytical chemist, chemistry lecturer, Member of the Victoria Legislature and Postmaster General
- Known for: organizing the Burke and Wills expedition namesake of genus Macadamia (macadamia nut)

John Macadam (29 May 1827 – 2 September 1865), was a Scottish-Australian chemist, medical doctor, medical teacher, Australian politician and cabinet minister, and honorary secretary of the Burke and Wills expedition. The genus Macadamia (macadamia nut) was named after him in 1857. He died at sea, on a voyage from Australia to New Zealand, aged 38.

== Early life ==
John Macadam was born at Northbank, Glasgow, Scotland, on 29 May 1827, the son of William Macadam (1783–1853) and Helen, née Stevenson (1803–1857). His father was a Glasgow businessman, who owned a spinning and textile printing works in Kilmarnock, and was a burgess and a bailie (magistrate) of Glasgow. His fellow industrialists and he in the craft had developed, using chemistry, the processes for the large-scale industrial printing of fabrics for which these plants in the area became known.

John Macadam was privately educated in Glasgow; he studied chemistry at the Andersonian University (now the University of Strathclyde) and went for advanced study at the University of Edinburgh under Professor William Gregory. In 1846–47, he went on to serve as assistant to Professor George Wilson at the University of Edinburgh in his laboratory in Brown Square. He was elected a fellow of the Royal Scottish Society of Arts that year, and in 1848, a member of the Glasgow Philosophical Society. He then studied medicine at the University of Glasgow (LFPS, MD,1854; FFPSG,1855).

He was a member of what became a small dynasty of Scottish scientists and lecturers in analytical chemistry, which included, other than himself, his eldest half brother William Macadam, his immediate younger brother Stevenson Macadam (a younger brother Charles Thomas Macadam, although not involved as a scientist, was also indirectly involved in chemistry as the senior partner in Odhams, a chemical fertiliser company) and nephews William Ivison Macadam and Stevenson J. C. G. Macadam, as well as the former nephew's daughter, his great niece Elison A. Macadam.

On 8 June 1855, aged 28, Macadam sailed for Melbourne in the Colony of Victoria, Australia, on the sailing ship Admiral. He arrived on 8 September 1855.

== Australian academic career ==
In 1855 he was a lecturer on chemistry and natural science at Scotch College, which had been founded four years before in 1851, having been engaged for the position before leaving Scotland.

In 1857 he was awarded an MD ad eundem from the University of Melbourne in acknowledgment of his MD from the University of Glasgow.

In 1857-1858 he also taught at Geelong Church of England Grammar School (now Geelong Grammar School). In 1858, he was appointed the Victorian government analytical chemist. In 1860 he became health officer to the City of Melbourne. He wrote several reports on public health.

On 3 March 1862 he was appointed as the first lecturer in medicine (chemistry and practical chemistry) at the University of Melbourne School of Medicine. For the next few years he held classes for a small number of medical students in the Analytical Laboratory behind the Public Library. He was also a member of the Board of Agriculture.

== Political life ==
Macadam became a member of the Victorian Legislative Assembly of the self-governing Colony of Victoria as a radical and supporter of the Land Convention, representing Castlemaine.

Appointed postmaster-general of Victoria in 1861, Macadam resigned from the legislature in 1864. He had sponsored bills on medical practitioners and adulteration of food which became law in 1862 and 1863.

== Royal Society of Victoria ==
Macadam was elected to the Philosophical Institute of Victoria in 1855 and served on its council. Between 1857 and 1862, Macadam served as honorary secretary of it and continued in that role when it became the Royal Society of Victoria in 1860, and was appointed vice-president of it in 1863. He was editor from 1855 to 1860 of first five volumes of the society's Transactions. He was active in erecting the Society's Meeting Hall (their present building) and was involved in the institute's initiative to obtain a royal charter. He saw both happen while he held office, when in January 1860, the Philosophical Institute became the Royal Society of Victoria and met in their new building.

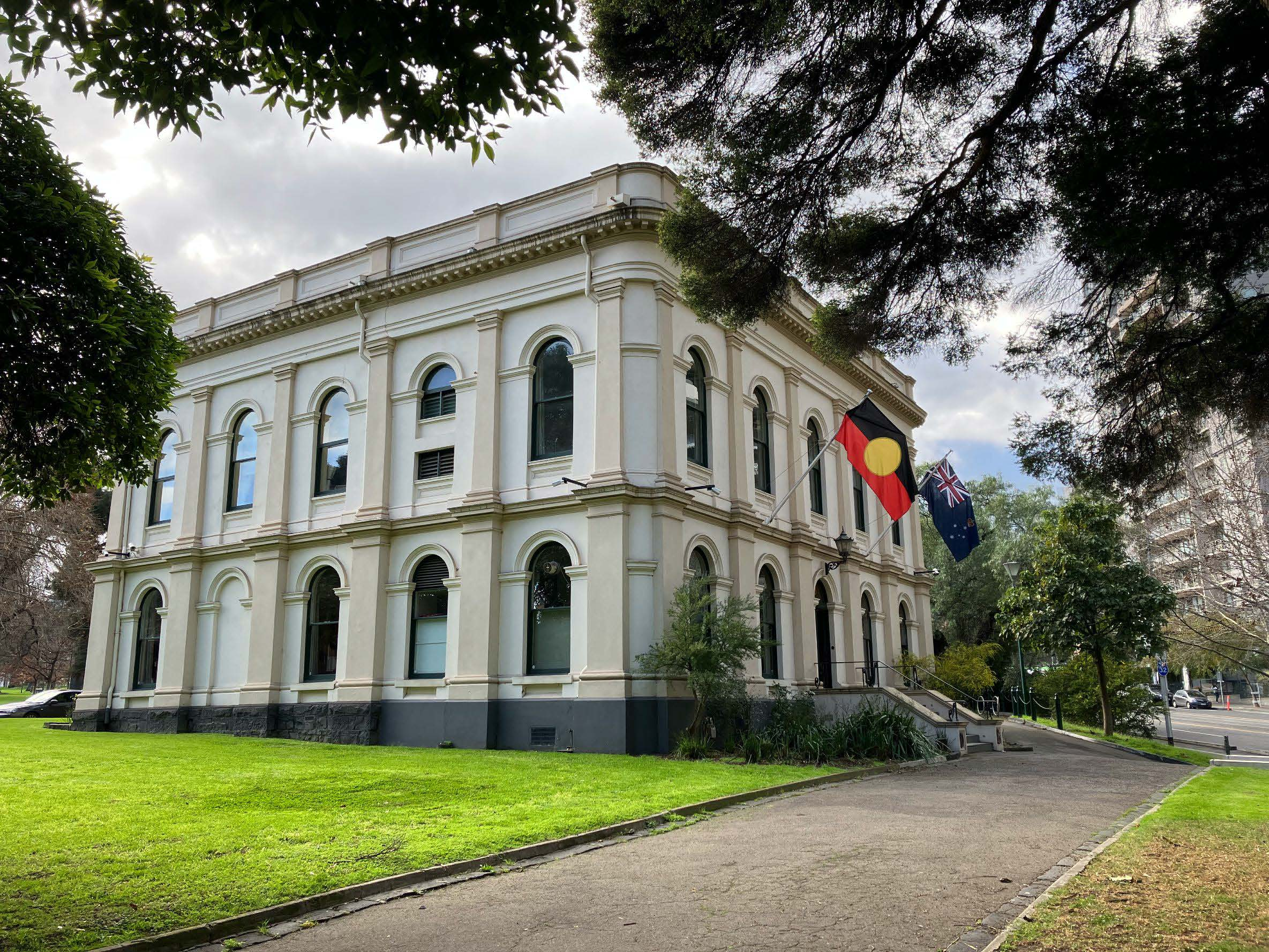
The Royal Society of Victoria's Hall, Melbourne. (photographed October 2022)

=== Burke and Wills expedition ===
Between 1857 and 1865, Macadam served as honorary secretary to the Exploration Committee of the Royal Society of Victoria, which organised the Burke and Wills expedition.

The expedition was organised by the society with the aim of crossing the continent of Australia from the south to the north coasts, map it, and collect scientific data and specimens. At that time, most of the interior of Australia had not been explored by the European settlers and was unknown to them.

In 1860–61, Robert O'Hara Burke and William John Wills led the expedition of 19 men with that intention, crossing Australia from Melbourne in the south, to the Gulf of Carpentaria in the north, a distance around 2,000 miles.

Three men ultimately travelled over 3,000 miles from Melbourne to the shores of the Gulf of Carpentaria and back to the Depot Camp at Cooper Creek. Seven men died in the attempt, including the leaders Burke and Wills. Of the four men who reached the north coast, only one, John King, survived with the help of the indigenous people to return to Melbourne.

This expedition became the first to cross the Australian continent. It was of great importance to the subsequent development of Australia and could be compared in importance to the Lewis and Clark Expedition overland to the North American Pacific Coast to the development of the United States.

After the heavy death toll of the expedition, initial criticism fell on the Royal Society, but it became clear that their foresight could not have prevented the deaths and this was then widely recognised when it became known that as Secretary of the Exploration Committee of the Burke and Wills expedition, Dr. Macadam had insisted on adequate provisions for their safety.

== Macadamia ==
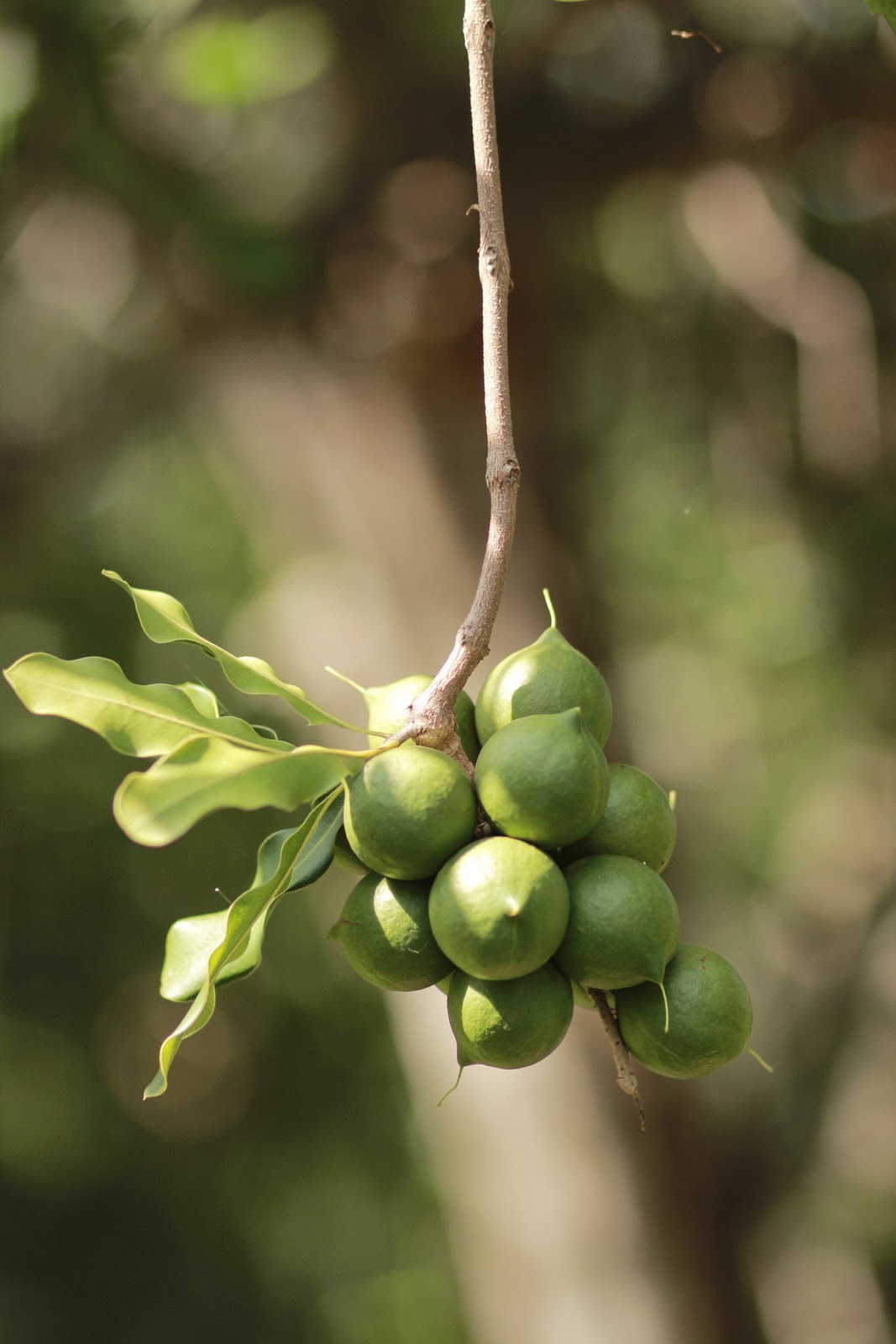
Macadamia nuts on tree

The macadamia (genus Macadamia) nut was discovered by the European settlers, and subsequently the tree was named after him by his friend and colleague, Ferdinand von Mueller (1825–1896), Director of the Royal Botanic Gardens, Melbourne. The tree gave his name to macadamia nuts. The genus Macadamia was first described scientifically in 1857 by Dr. Mueller and he named the new genus in honour of his friend Dr John Macadam. Mueller had done a great deal of taxonomy of the flora, naming innumerable genera but chose this "...a beautiful genus dedicated to John Macadam, M.D. the talented and deserving secretary of our institute."

== Australian rules football ==
On 7 August 1858, Macadam, along with Tom Wills, officiated at a game of football played between Scotch College and Melbourne Grammar. This game was a predecessor to the modern game of Australian rules football and is commemorated by a statue outside the Melbourne Cricket Ground.

The two schools have competed annually ever since, lately for the Cordner–Eggleston Cup.

== University of Melbourne ==
Macadam acted as Secretary of the Victoria Industrial Exhibition in 1861 and soon after it closed started lectures to medical students on chemistry. These lectures helped in the formation in 1862 of the Medical School at the University of Melbourne. He was appointed the university's first lecturer in chemistry.

== Learned societies ==
- 1847 fellow of the Royal Scottish Society of Arts
- 1848 a member of the Glasgow Philosophical Society (now Royal Philosophical Society of Glasgow)
- 1855 elected Fellow of the Faculty of Physicians and Surgeons, the University of Glasgow
- 1855 elected member (1857–59 Hon. Sec.), the Philosophical Institute of Victoria, later becoming while he was in office the Royal Society of Victoria (He edited their Transactions from 1855 to 1860)
- 1860 vice-president of Royal Society of Victoria
- 1861 Secretary of the Victoria Industrial Exhibition.

== Family ==
On 18 September 1856, a year after he arrived from Scotland, he married Elizabeth Clark in Melbourne, Australia. She had arrived three days before the wedding with her maid on the Admiral, the same ship on which he had travelled out a year earlier, which reached Hobson's Bay (Melbourne's port) on 15 September 1856, having set sail from London on 7 June 1856. Elizabeth Clark was probably born on 7 October 1832 in Barony parish Scotland, near Glasgow (her mother being Mary McGregor). She was the second daughter of John Clark, of Levenfield House in Alexandria, the Vale of Leven, a short distance north of Glasgow in West Dunbartonshire. His Levenfield Works were involved in similar work to Dr John Macadam's father William Macadam in Kilmarnock in the then lucrative business of textile printing for domestic and European markets. The Clarks and Macadams must have become known to each other in Scotland because of their respective fathers' business connections. Elizabeth died in 1915, in Brighton, Victoria.

John and Elizabeth had two sons:

John Melnotte Macadam was born 29 August 1858 at Fitzroy, Melbourne, Australia, and died on 30 January 1859, aged 5 months (he was reburied with his father, whose monument bears the additional inscription: In memory of his only children John Melnotte Macadam Born August 29, 1858 Died January 30, 1859 followed by an inscription to his second son below it).

William Castlemaine Macadam was born on 2 July 1860 and died 17 December 1865 at Williamstown, Victoria, Australia. He died aged five and had survived his father by a few months. The inscription on his father's burial monument under His only children has him listed under his elder brother (above), who died in infancy, but does not for some reason give William's date of death on it.

== Death ==
In March 1865 Macadam sailed to New Zealand to give evidence at the trial of Captain W. A. Jarvey, accused of fatally poisoning his wife, but the jury did not reach a verdict. During the return voyage, Macadam fractured his ribs during a storm. He was advised, on medical grounds, not to return for the adjourned trial but did so and died on the ship on 2 September 1865. His medical-student assistant John Drummond Kirkland gave evidence at the trial in Macadam's place, and Jarvey was convicted.

The Australian News commented, "At the time of his death, Dr Macadam was but 38 years of age; there can be little doubt that the various and onerous duties he discharged for the public must be attributed in great measure the shortening of his days." The Australian Medical Journal stated, "For some time it had been evident to his friends that his general health was giving way: that a frame naturally robust and vigorous was gradually becoming undermined by the incessant and harassing duties of the multifarious offices he filled." The inquest verdict (he died at sea) stated, "His death was caused by excessive debility and general exhaustion."

== Funeral ==
The funeral was large. The newspapers carried tributes and subsequently lengthier obituaries from learned societies were published, such as that in the Australian Medical Journal and elsewhere. The Melbourne Leader described the funeral: "The coffin was drawn by four horses. Four mourning coaches contained the chief mourners and the more intimate friends of the deceased gentleman. A large procession followed, in which were several members of Parliament, the members of the Royal Society, the Chief Justice; the Mayor and corporation of the city of Melbourne. A number of private carriages and the public wound up the procession....At the University, the chancellor, the vice-chancellor, and a number of the students, all in their academic robes, met the funeral cortege, and proceeded the remainder of the distance". The chief mourner was his youngest brother, George Robert Macadam (1837–1918). John Macadam's grave, surmounted by a marble obelisk, is in Melbourne General Cemetery.

== Widow remarried ==
After John Macadam and her children's deaths his widow, Elizabeth Clark, later remarried. She married the Reverend John Dalziel Dickie, who was pastor at Colac for 32 years. They married on 26 February 1868 They had four daughters. Elizabeth Dickie died aged 82 in 1915, in Brighton, Victoria, as the widow of the Rev. Dickie. Dickie had died 25 December 1909.
