= William Durham =

William Durham may refer to:

- William H. Durham (born 1949), human ecologist at Stanford University
- William Howard Durham (1873–1912), Pentecostal pioneer and theologian
- William J. Durham (1896–1970), African-American attorney and civil rights leader
- William Durham (tennis), Australian tennis player
- William Durham (chemist) FRSE (1834–1893)

== See also ==
- William of Durham (died 1249), said to have founded University College, Oxford, England
