= Eastfield, Edinburgh =

District of Edinburgh, Scotland

Coordinates: 55.947°N 3.081°W

Eastfield
- Location within the City of Edinburgh council area Location within Scotland
- OS grid reference: NT325732
- Council area: City of Edinburgh
- Lieutenancy area: Edinburgh
- Country: Scotland
- Sovereign state: United Kingdom
- Post town: EDINBURGH
- Postcode district: EH15
- Dialling code: 0131
- Police: Scotland
- Fire: Scottish
- Ambulance: Scottish
- UK Parliament: Edinburgh East
- Scottish Parliament: Edinburgh Eastern

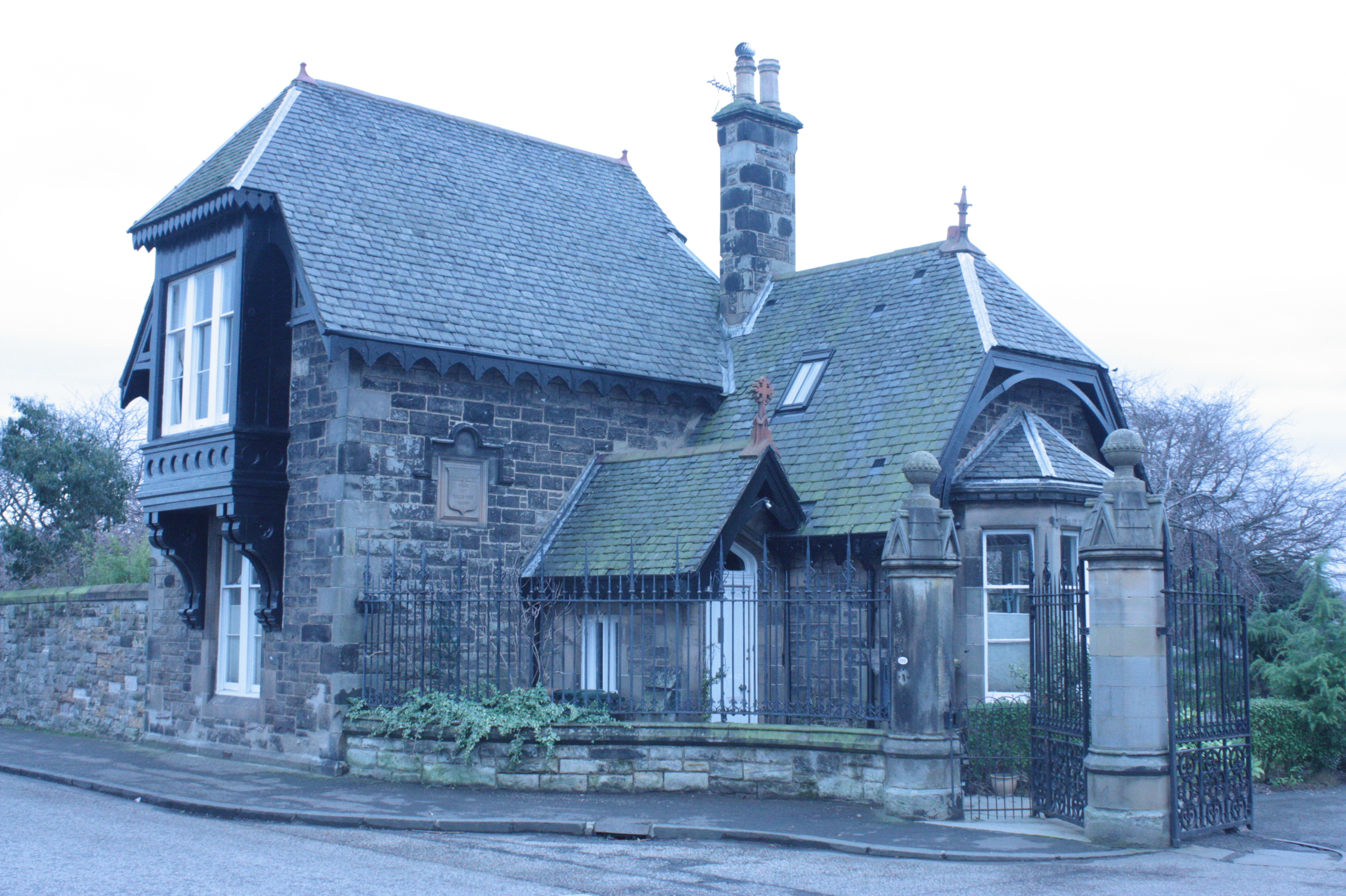
Portobello Cemetery lodge and entrance

Eastfield is a primarily residential district on the north eastern outskirts of Edinburgh, the capital of Scotland. It lies between Joppa and the Edinburgh City boundary with Musselburgh. The district is bounded on the north by the Firth of Forth, on the west by Joppa and the main East Coast rail line, and on the south by farmland and the grounds of Newhailes House, a National Trust for Scotland property. The western boundary leads into Musselburgh along the coast, passing the small harbour at Fisherrow. In addition to housing, Eastfield includes Portobello Cemetery and a private five-hole golf course behind the houses on the south side of Milton Road.

== Notable buildings ==
- Jewel and Esk College
- Milton House (now Kings Manor Hotel)
- Queens Bay Lodge

== Portobello Cemetery ==
The cemetery (including the lodge and gates) was designed by Robert Paterson in 1877.

The cemetery lies on Milton Road East in Eastfield. The southern section holds a large Muslim graveyard. Notable interments include:

- William Durham FRSE (1834–1893), chemist and astronomer
- John Proudfoot Goodsir (1864–1952), architect
- Alexander Kirkwood engraver, the "son" of Alexander Kirkwood & Son
- Ivison Macadam
- Stevenson Macadam
- William Ivison Macadam
- Reginald William Mapleton, eminent surgeon, son of Dean Reginald Mapleton
- Sir Edward Moss (1852–1912), theatre impresario

== Sources ==
(Google Maps) (Wikimapia)
