= William Macadam =

Scottish industrialist

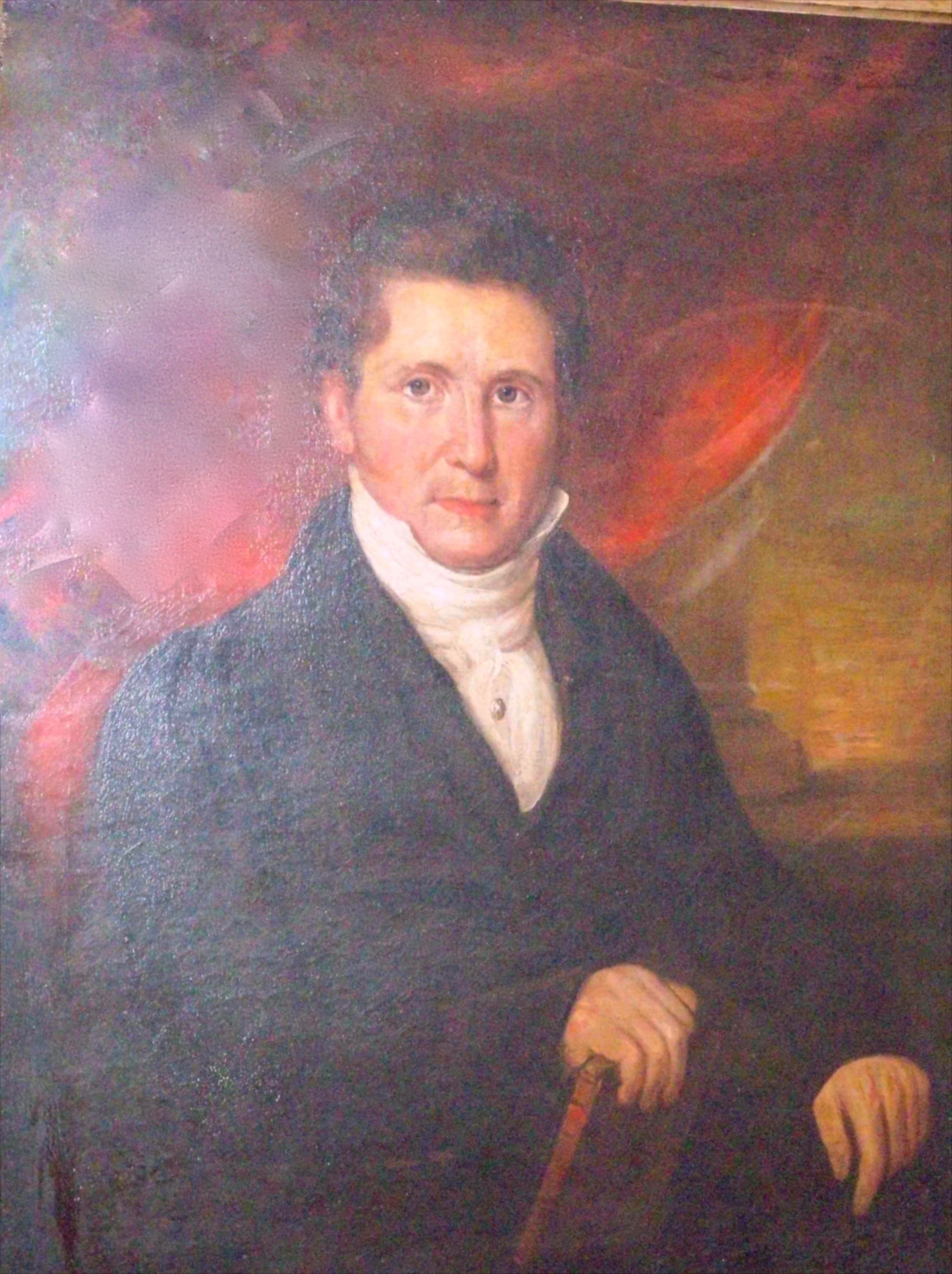

Calico printer and weaver

Burgess and bailie of Glasgow

Personal details
- Born: William Macadam; 3 November 1783 Glasgow, Scotland
- Died: 1853 (aged 69–70) Glasgow, Scotland
- Spouse(s): (1)Rachel Gentle, (2)Helen Stevenson
- Education: Weavers Guild
- Occupation: Owner textile printing and weaving business

William Macadam (3 November 1783 – 1853 ) was an industrialist, a burgess and bailie of Glasgow. He owned a weaving mill and calico printing works in Kilmarnock near Glasgow.

He was the patriarch of a small dynasty of chemical scientists including his sons William Macadam, John Macadam and Stevenson Macadam, grandsons William Ivison Macadam and Stevenson J. C. G. Macadam and great granddaughter Elison A. Macadam.

== Businessman and public figure ==
A burgess and a bailie of Glasgow, he became a prominent Glasgow businessman who owned and operated a mill near Glasgow and a mill and textile, calico (and shawl) printing works at Greenholm in Kilmarnock, Ayrshire, south of Glasgow on the River Irvine.

William was the son of John McAdam and Margaret Finlay. His father had also been a burgess of Glasgow and an owner of the Mile End Spinning Company.

William Macadam's operation together with that of his fellow industrialists in similar business, used new chemical processes in textile printing which enabled them to develop into large scale industries for the printing of cotton fabrics, which the plants in the area soon became internationally known for. Producing colours for textile printing required extensive chemical knowledge coupled with technical expertise. Each colour and its varying degrees of brightness had to withstand the different fixing processes and this was particularly difficult when printing Turkey Red.

The fabrics were then made into cotton polka dot handkerchiefs (particularly favoured in France), cotton calico scarves, shawls, garments and chintzes that were used in Britain and exported to Europe and throughout the world. His plants seemed to have been largely involved in the weaving and printing of the heavier of these cotton cloth materials. The process required a lot of water hence the location on the River Irvine and Clyde.

After Macadam's death in 1853, the US Civil War (1861–1865) reduced the vital cotton supplies through Glasgow from 8,700 tonnes (171,252 cwt) in 1861 to 366 tonnes (7,216 cwt) in 1864. Without the basic raw material for their needs, this became a period of major hardship for these companies until India and West Africa became major exporters. Thus Macadam's former Kilmarnock plant was sold and part of it was converted into a flour mill.

== The family's involvement in business as burgesses of Glasgow ==
Originally burgesses were inhabitants of a city where they owned land and who contributed to the running of the town and its taxation. The title of burgess was later restricted to merchants and craftsmen, so that only burgesses could enjoy the privileges of trading or practising a craft in the city through a Guild or own companies (Macadam belonged to the Weaver's Guild). Only burgesses had the right to vote in municipal or Parliamentary elections. However, these political privileges were removed by the Reform Act in 1832, and the burgesses' ancient exclusive trading rights through their Guilds were abolished in 1846. Thereafter a burgess became a title which gave social standing to the office and usually carried with it a role which involved charitable activities in a Guild, as it does today.

Macadam's burgess ticket is dated 25 August 1815, allowing him entry into the Weaver's Guild and thus permitted him to carry out business on his own, (his father John McAdam is given as 'deceased' on it).

He was a third-generation burgess of a family of ten burgesses and guild brothers of Glasgow. He was also enrolled as a burgess of Calton, a burgh of barony, 6 February 1816.

William was the eldest son of John McAdam,

John in turn was the eldest son of Alexander McAdam.

Alexander was in turn the eldest son of an earlier burgess John McAdam, tanner, of Glasgow.

== Impact on the future developments in science and chemistry ==
The various types of new complex chemical processes and inventions involved in Macadam's factory for the manufacturing and printing of cotton, calico, and linen textiles excited his sons and they soon became interested in the new field of chemistry. This meant that they largely did not follow their previous generations in business but went on to play a leading scientific and academic role in developing chemical innovation and knowledge.

Of the five sons, three took up chemical science as a profession, William Macadam, John Macadam and Stevenson Macadam and a fourth, Charles, was involved in a chemical fertiliser company. Subsequently two more generations were involved: Stevenson's two sons William Ivison Macadam and Stevenson J. C. G. Macadam and William Ivison Macadam's daughter, Elison Macadam (later Desch). A total of seven family members (if one includes Charles Macadam's involvement in chemical fertilisers).

== Family ==
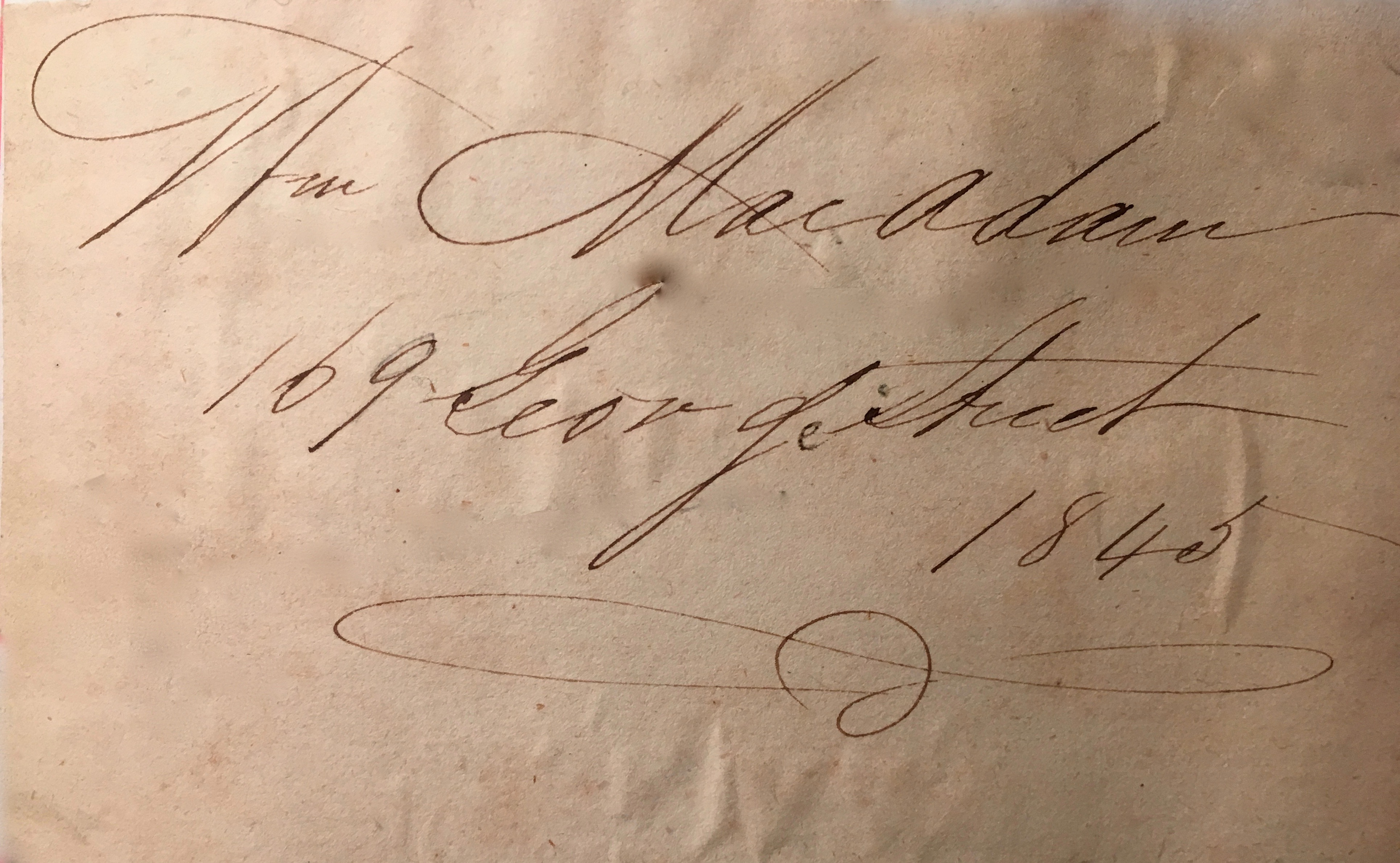
Macadam's signature 1845 from book flyleaf (John Macadam, Earthwords)

Macadam was the last in the family to have his name spelled in the various ways that Mac (son of) was spelled at the time as McAdam, M'Adam, but usually using both "MacAdam" and "Macadam", but the subsequent members of the family settled on the latter spelling.

=== William's two wives ===
William's first wife was Rachel Gentle with whom he had one son, William.

William's second wife was Helen Ann Stevenson (1803–1857). The wedding took place on 3 January 1825 at Cumbernauld. She died on 20 January 1857 at 6 Kelvinhaugh Street, Glasgow, and is buried with her husband in Glasgow Cathedral Old Burial Ground Glasgow. She was the daughter of William Stevenson of Park Farm, Clackmannan. and Helen Grindlay. with whom he had a further seven children.

=== His children ===
- William Macadam (1814 – circa 1877), was the first chemical scientist in the family, the eldest and a half-brother to his father's other younger children.
- Helen Grindlay Macadam (1825 – circa 1839)
- Dr John Macadam (1827–1865) emigrated to Australia, was a medical teacher, Australian politician and cabinet minister. After whom the genus Macadamia (macadamia nut) was named.
- Stevenson Macadam (1829–1901) became a leading chemical scientist, analytical chemist and lecturer in Edinburgh and was a founder of the Institute of Chemistry of Great Britain (now the Royal Society of Chemistry) and a founder of the Society of Chemical Industry.
- Margaret Macadam (1831–1865)
- Charles Thomas Macadam (1832–1906) became senior partner in Odams, a fertiliser company, and was to hold the Royal Warrant as Purveyor of Chemical Manures to Queen Victoria and was a sponsor of the 1862 International Exhibition.
- George Robert Macadam (1837–1918), who followed his older brother John and emigrated to Australia where he became a teacher.
- Mary Elison Macadam (1835–1889)

== Residence ==
Macadam lived at 169 George Street, Glasgow, (the house stood on part of the present site of The Premier Inn Glasgow City Centre (George Square), at 187 George Street). His house had then backed onto St. David's "Ramshorn" Kirkyard or churchyard.

== Death ==
Macadam died in 1853. His wife Helen Stevenson Macadam died in 1857. He and his wife are buried in Glasgow Cathedral Old Burial Ground (St. Mungo's Burying Ground, Glasgow)
