= William Durham (chemist) =

Scottish chemist, papermaker, astronomer and academic author

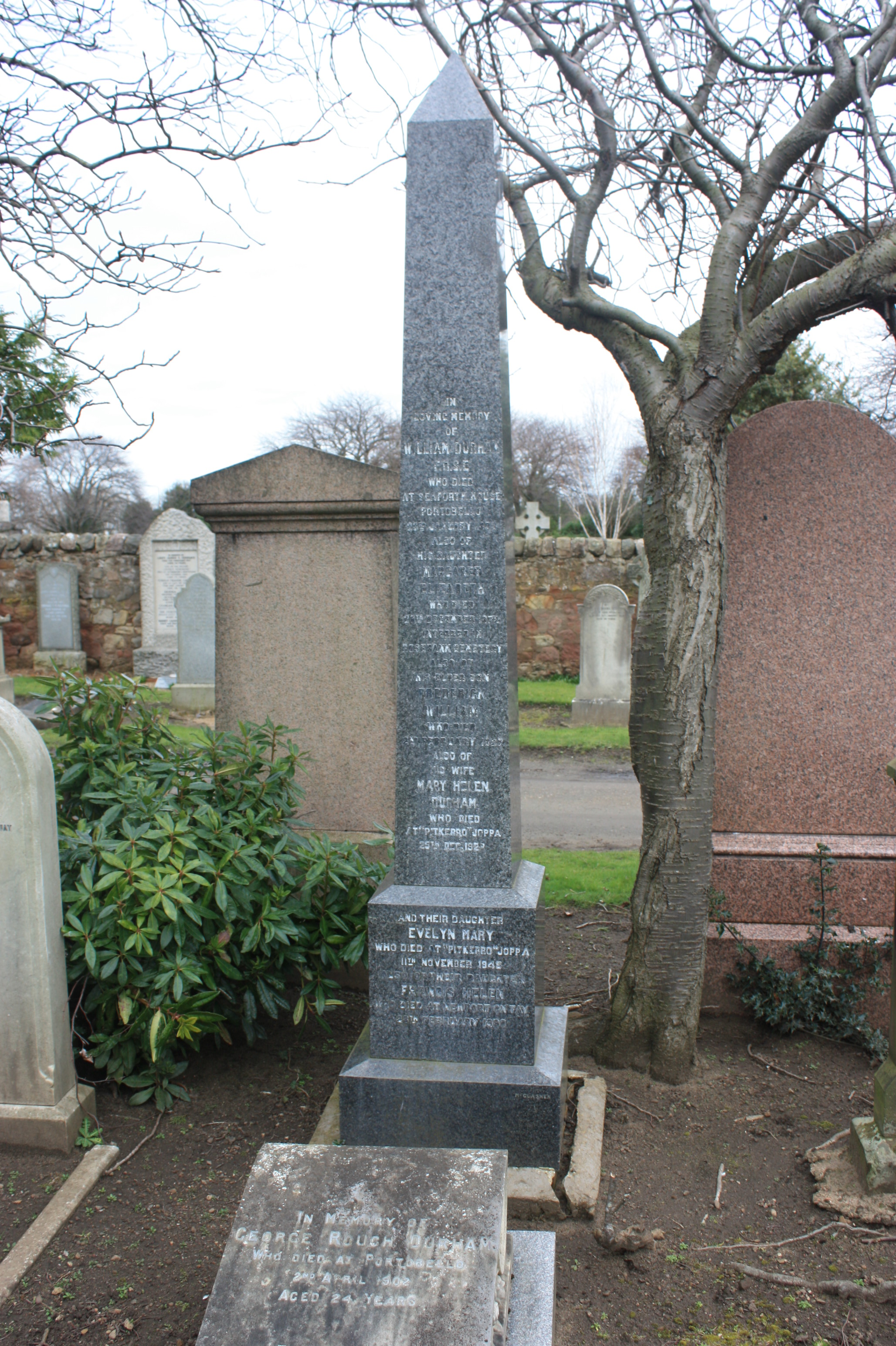
The grave of William Durham, Portobello Cemetery, Edinburgh

William Durham FRSE (8 November 1834 – 23 January 1893) was a Scottish chemist, papermaker, astronomer and academic author.

== Life ==
He was born in Edinburgh in November 1834, probably the son of James Durham, a stationer at 9 Blair Street in the Old Town. William is known to have attended the High School in Edinburgh. He was originally apprenticed to the publisher Adam Black and appears to here have gained an interest in paper-making and the chemistry of paper.

In 1874 he was elected a Fellow of the Royal Society of Edinburgh. His proposers were Peter Guthrie Tait, William Lindsay Alexander, Sir James Donaldson and Stevenson Macadam.

Durham was a member of the British Astronomical Association. He had a private laboratory and observatory at Glenesk House in Loanhead south of Edinburgh, but lived at Seaforth House, 16 Straiton Place in Portobello.

He died at home on Straiton Place on 23 January 1893. He is buried in Portobello Cemetery in eastern Edinburgh. The grave lies in an inner grass area, south-east of the entrance, slightly north of the grave on the eastern path to Stevenson Macadam.

== Family ==
He was married to Mary Helen Durham who died on Christmas Day 1928.

Their children included Frederick William Durham (d.1927) and Margaret Elizabeth Durham (d.1872).

== Publications ==
- On Solutions (1887)
- Evolution, Antiquity of Man, Bacteria etc (1890)
- Astronomy: Sun, Moon, Stars etc. (1891)
