= Stevenson Macadam =

Scottish scientist (1829-1901)

Stevenson Macadam FRSE FIC FCS
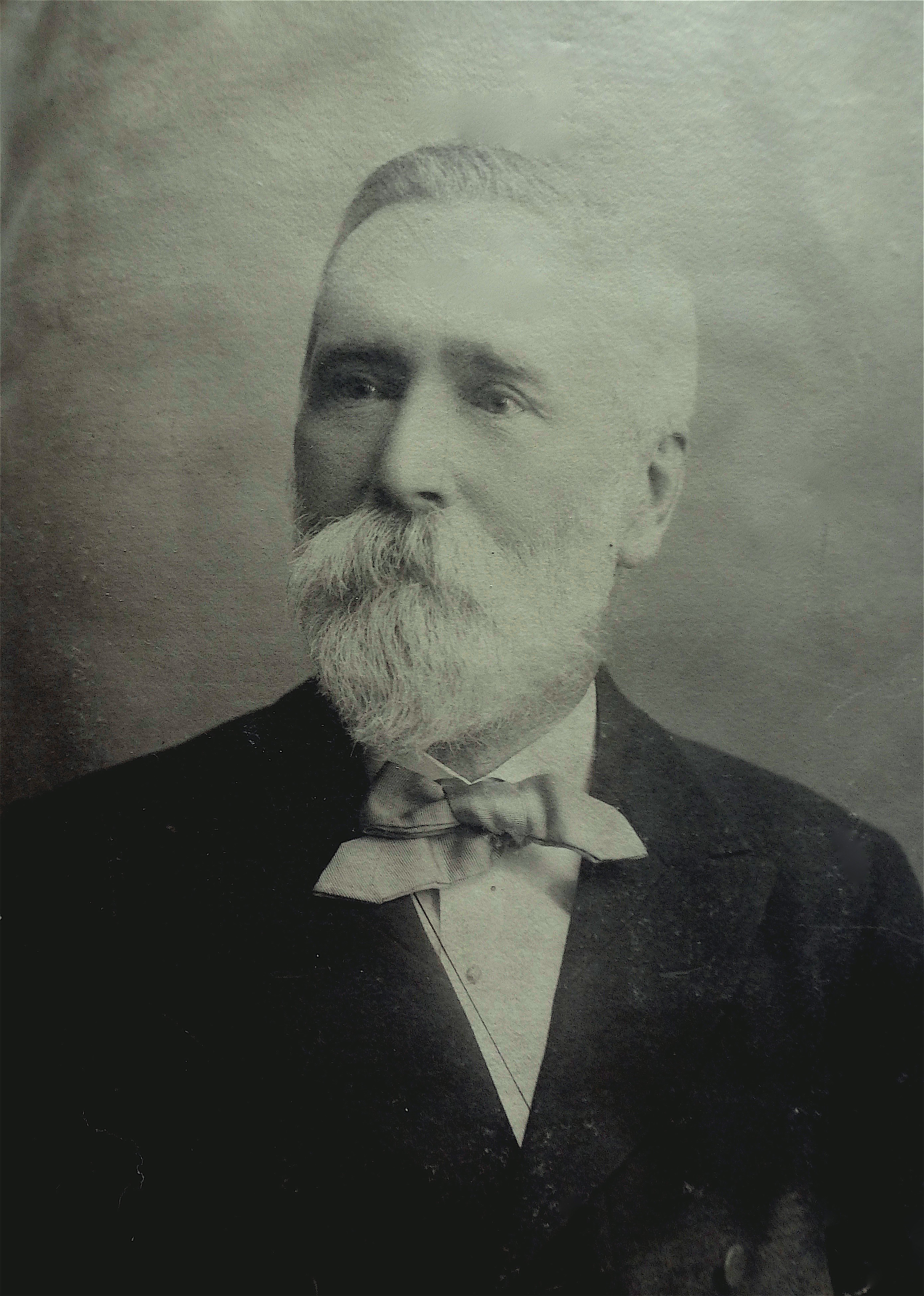

A founder of the Institute of Chemistry of Great Britain (now the Royal Society of Chemistry)

A founder of the Society of Chemical Industry

Personal details
- Born: Stevenson Macadam; 27 April 1829 Glasgow, Scotland, United Kingdom
- Died: 24 January 1901 (aged 71) Edinburgh, Scotland, United Kingdom
- Spouse: Jessie Andrew Ivison (1834–1912)
- Education: Glasgow Mechanics Institution; Giessen University, Germany
- Occupation: Scottish Analytical Chemist, Lecturer Edinburgh University, 'Royal College of Surgeons of Edinburgh

Stevenson Macadam FRSE FIC FCS FRSSA (27 April 1829 – 24 January 1901) was a Scottish scientist, analytical chemist, lecturer, and academic author.

He was a founding member of the Institute of Chemistry of Great Britain (now the Royal Society of Chemistry) and a founding member of the Society of Chemical Industry. He was also a President of the Royal Scottish Society of the Arts. He was a prominent lecturer in chemistry at institutions in Edinburgh, including Edinburgh University and the Royal College of Surgeons of Edinburgh and the Edinburgh veterinary colleges. He also had a large analytical chemical consulting practise.

He was part of a small dynasty of Scottish chemical scientists including his elder half-brother William Macadam, brother Dr. John Macadam and two sons, William Ivison Macadam and Stevenson J. C. G. Macadam and granddaughter Elison A. Macadam.

== Early life ==
Stevenson Macadam was born at North Bank in Glasgow on 27 April 1829, one of four sons and four daughters (the eldest being a half brother). He married Jessie Andrew Ivison on 23 April 1855 in Neilston, Renfrew, Scotland.

His father William Macadam (1783–1853) was a Burgess and a Bailie [magistrate] of Glasgow.

He was a third generation Burgess of a family of at least ten Burgesses and Guild brothers of Glasgow. William was the eldest son of John McAdam, John in turn was the eldest son of Alexander McAdam. Alexander was in turn the eldest son of an earlier John McAdam, Tanner, of Glasgow.

William was a Glasgow businessman who owned a mill and textile printing works at Greenholme, Kilmarnock. He and his fellow industrialists in the craft around Glasgow had developed the expertise in chemistry processes for the large scale industrial printing of fabrics for which these plants in the area became well known, both for domestic and foreign supply.

William Macadam and his family lived at 169 East George Street, Glasgow, Scotland. and Stevenson's mother was his father's second wife Helen Stevenson (1803–1857). Helen Stevenson was born 24 August 1803. The wedding took place on 3 January 1825 at Clackmannan. She was the second child of William Stevenson and Helen Grindlay. She died on 20 January 1857 at 6 Kelvinhaugh Street, Glasgow, and was buried with her husband in Glasgow Cathedral (St. Mungo's) Old Burial Ground in the Macadam tomb.

=== Father's wives and their children ===
William's first wife was Rachel Gentle with whom he had one son:

William Macadam', the eldest child, was the first chemical scientist in the family, and a half brother to Stevenson.

William's second wife was Helen Stevenson (1803–1857) with whom he had a further seven children:

Helen Grindlay Macadam

John Macadam (Stevenson's eldest full brother) who later emigrated to Australia.

Stevenson Macadam, the subject of this entry, was the third son.

Margaret Macadam

Charles Thomas Macadam a younger brother became senior partner in Odams, a fertiliser company, and was to hold the Royal Warrant as Purveyor of Chemical Manures [fertiliser] to Queen Victoria.

George Robert Macadam, his youngest brother, followed his older brother John and emigrated to Australia.

Mary Elison Macadam

== Education ==
Stevenson studied at the Glasgow Mechanics Institution; College of Science and Arts (now the University of Strathclyde). He received his first tuition at the Mechanics Institution under his elder brother John Macadam after whom the Macadamia nut was later named.

He received his doctorate (PhD) from Giessen University. Whilst in Germany he also spent some time working in the famous laboratory of Robert Bunsen.

John Macadam then became assistant to Dr. George Wilson, Lecturer in Chemistry at the University of Edinburgh College of Medicine and Veterinary Medicine from 1846 to 1847. The University of Edinburgh Medical School was then as now one of the world's preeminent medical centres of learning and from then on preeminent in the field of chemistry. Afterwards John Macadam returned to Glasgow for further medical studies(before emigrating to Australia in 1855 where he died aged 38).

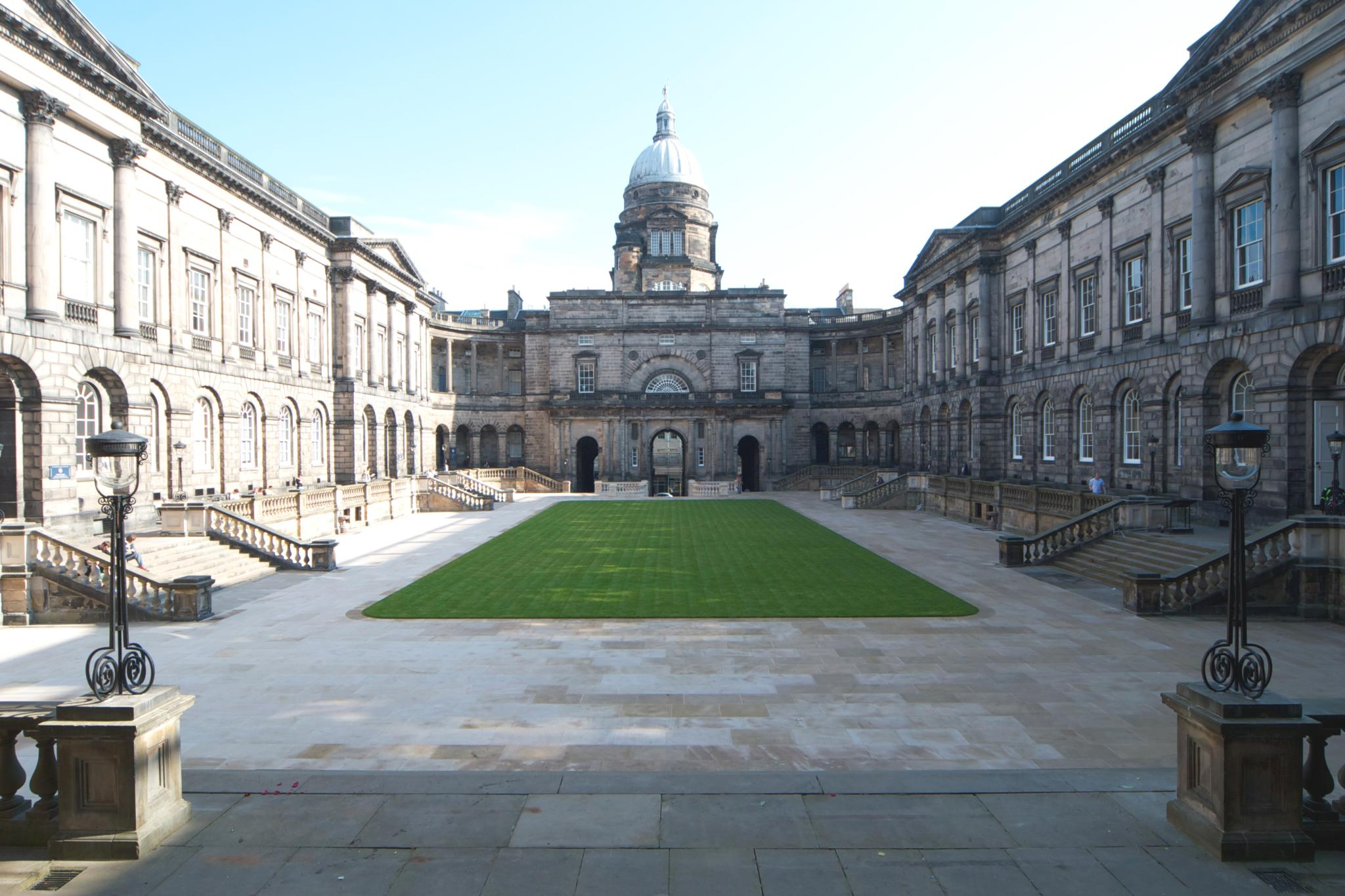
University of Edinburgh Old College Quad

Stevenson then became Dr. George Wilson's assistant, in his brother's stead, at the University of Edinburgh and at the Royal College of Surgeons from 1847 to 1855.

It seems likely that the various types of complex chemical processes involved in their father's factory in his calico printing and manufacturing business was what got William's sons interested in the field of chemistry, in which they were to play such a pioneering role in their later lives. Of the four sons three took to chemical science as a profession. Subsequently, two more generations were involved: Stevenson's two sons William Ivison Macadam and Stevenson J. C. G. Macadam and William Ivison Macadam's daughter, Elison Macadam (later Desch). Seven in all (if one includes Charles Thomas Macadam's involvement in chemical fertilisers)l.

== Professional and academic career ==
In 1850 Dr. Stevenson Macadam began lecturing in the Royal College of Surgeons of Edinburgh and became a professor there (and ultimately held that position for 50 years).

In 1855 he also began lecturing in Chemistry for pharmaceutical students on his own. He did this from quarters on Princes Street, Edinburgh

In 1855, Dr. Macadam was appointed Lecturer on Chemistry at the University of Edinburgh Medical School and the University of Edinburgh College of Medicine and Veterinary Medicine after Dr. George Wilson was appointed Regius Professor of Technology at Edinburgh University (from 1855 until his death in 1859) although Dr. Wilson retained his rooms at Surgeons Hall. During that time Dr. Macadam conducted his large classes in Adam Square at the School of Arts, with which he had been connected for several years. His three-year course led to the qualification ChB, representing a full understanding of medical drugs and their properties. A huge number of Scotland's medical and veterinarian elite passed through his course.

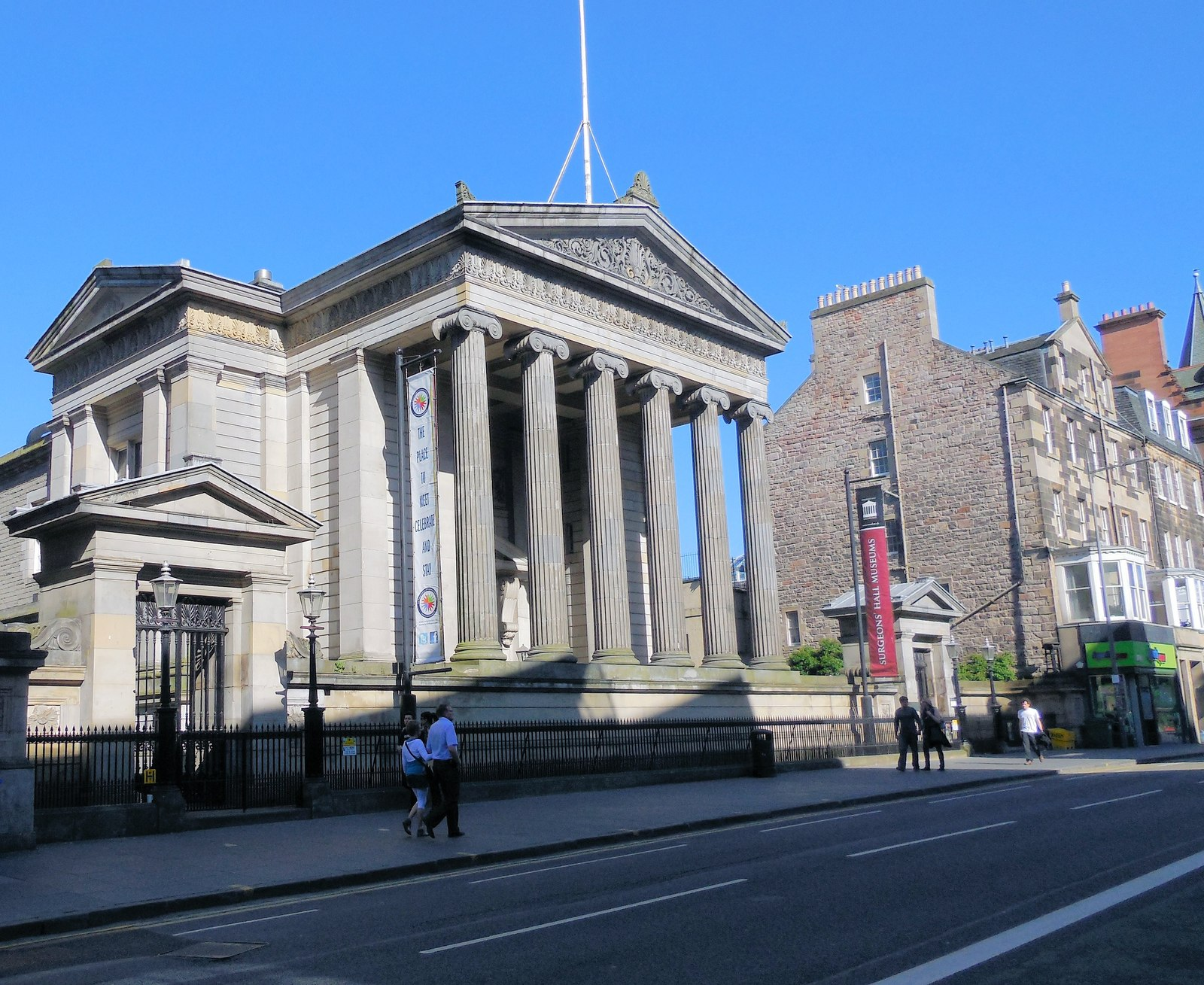
Royal College of Surgeons of Edinburgh.Surgeons Hall

Dr. Macadam was a successful lecturer and his classes were very well attended and "were a standing memorial" to his power of teaching in the view of The Scotsman.

In 1866 a larger lecture hall and laboratory was built at Surgeons Hall and he was then again able to hold his classes there.

He also lectured at both Edinburgh's veterinary colleges. First at The Dick Veterinary College, later to become Royal (Dick) School of Veterinary Studies, the Veterinary School of the University of Edinburgh, (since known for the first animal cloning: Dolly the sheep in 1996). It was founded by William Dick (1793–1866) in 1923 and was the first veterinary school in Scotland.

Subsequently, from 1873, Dr. Macadam lectured at the "New Veterinary College" housed in Gayfield House, following its foundation by William Williams (1832–1900) in 1873. Dr. Stevenson Macadam was one of the original six founders.

Dr. Macadam remained on the staff of the New Veterinary College until it moved to its newly built campus at Elm Row, Edinburgh in 1883 when he resigned in favour of his son Professor Ivison Macadam. (Prof. W. Ivison Macadam was generally known by his middle name Ivison).

On Dr. Macadam's retirement in 1900 he had completed fifty years as a lecturer, forty-five of which had been as an independent.

He also had a large analytical chemical consulting practice and was sought after for expertise in his field.

He acted as Scientific Advisor to the Northern Lighthouse Board of Scotland.

== Learned societies ==
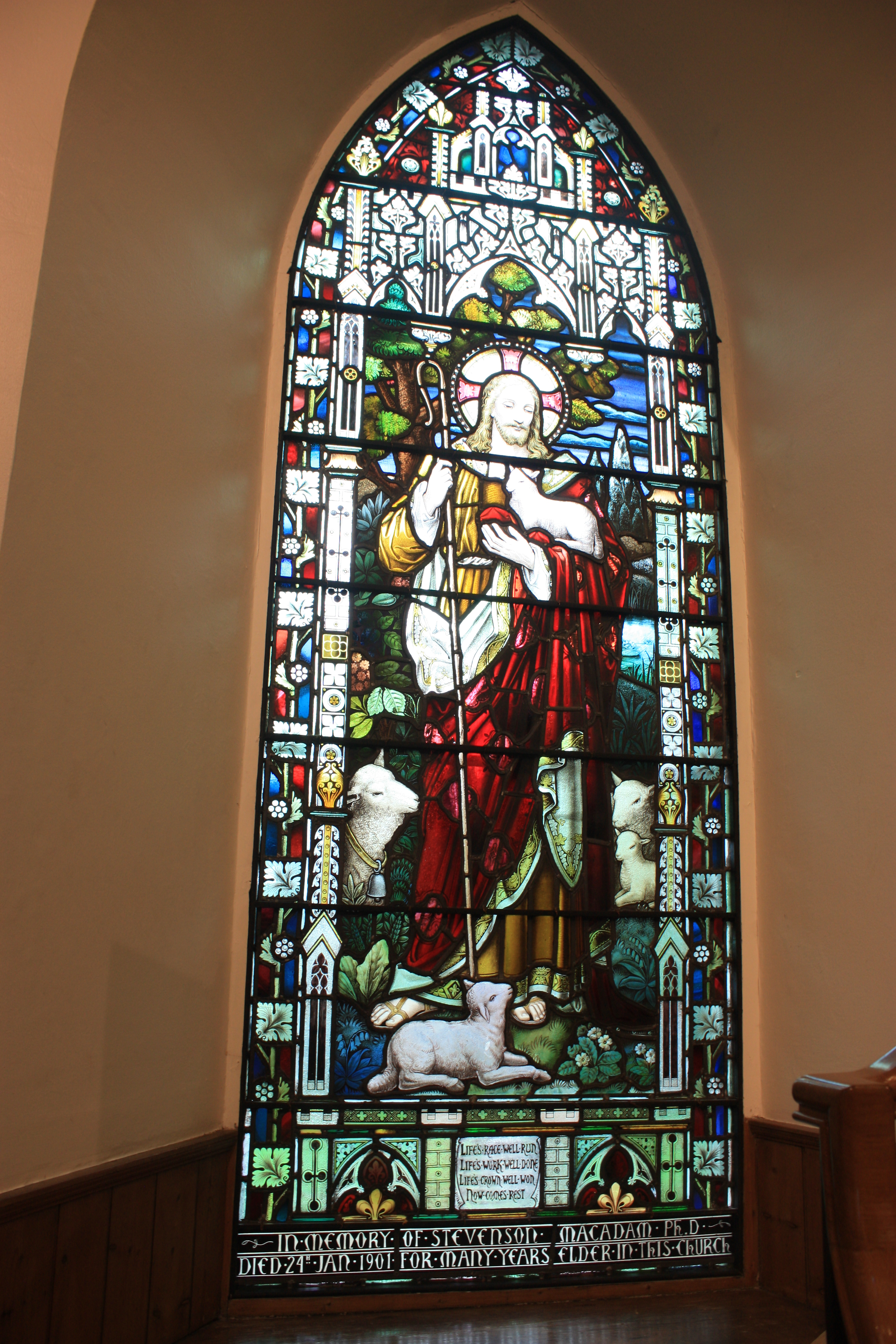
Memorial window to Stevenson Macadam, Duddingston Kirk

1854 Fellow (President 1864–5) of the Royal Scottish Society of the Arts (Queen Victoria's consort Prince Albert, as a result of his interest in the subjects, became a regular presence while Dr Stevenson Macadam was president).

1855 Fellow of the Royal Society of Edinburgh.

1877 A founder of the Institute of Chemistry of Great Britain (now the Royal Institute of Chemistry).

1881 A founder of the Society of Chemical Industry in London.

1900 Institute of Chemistry GBI Council Member

== Publications ==
He was the author of many papers on scientific subjects such as water supply, drainage and on chemistry to the arts and manufacturing.

Among them were:

- Botany the Plant and its Food (1855)
- The Chemistry of Common Things (1866)
- Inorganic Chemistry (1866) (co-author with George Wilson)
- Practical Chemistry (1872) (reprinted 1881)
- On the Detection of Strychnine (1856)

== Personal life ==
=== Residences ===
He lived from the late 1860s at Brighton House, 11 East Brighton Crescent in Portobello, Edinburgh (photograph above), where he died, having previously lived at the addresses of the places of his children's births at their birth dates below.

The family also had a country retreat in Innerleithen. There he was able to engage in his favourite outdoor pursuits, fly fishing on the Tweed and Leithen Water, hill walking, rowing and following the Otter Hounds.

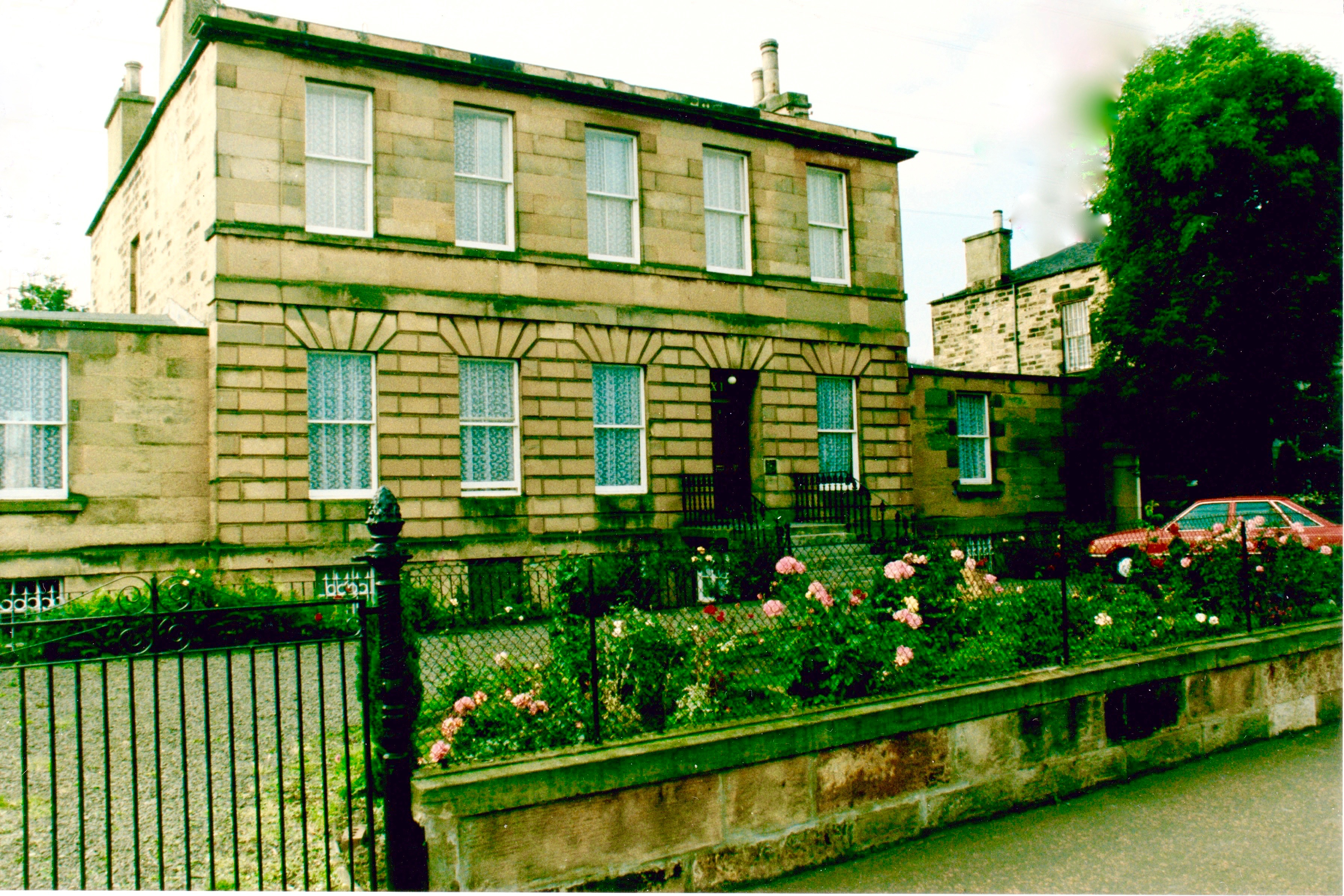
Stevenson Macadam House Brighton House, 11 E. Brighton Crescent, Portobello, Edinburgh

Stevenson Macadam's granddaughter remembers Brighton House, Portobello as: "a large one built with a semi basement in the front and a full storey basement at the back. The dining room was a long room with three windows looking out to the front and an impressive fireplace guarded by "Knights" in armour.... Behind the dining room stretched a passageway that led to a number of rooms. The drawing-room above the dining room, was full of curios and museum pieces... The parlour was at the back of a spacious hall which reached up to the top of the house. The three parlour windows went down to the floor... the far windows opened on to a balcony...and steps led down into the garden where "Nero" the large great dane lived, also numerous fantailed pigeons. Along one side of the garden was a range of greenhouses with temperatures from medium to warm. Grannie used to spend a lot of time tending to her hothouse flowers – we children often got into trouble when Thomas – the gardener coachman – reported doors left open. A large weeping willow with wooden seat around the trunk grew in the middle of the lawn and here we used to have strawberry feasts in season."

"Connected with the principal bedrooms at the back of the house were semi-circular turrets ending in peaks in the roof – like a Scottish castle – these were really W.C.s reached from the bedrooms." Steps from the hall led down to the kitchen quarters that seemed to go on forever. "The kitchen was a large one, two storeys high, nearby was a big store room which generally had hams, plum puddings and such like hanging from hooks in the ceiling."

=== Politics and Church ===
Dr. Macadam had been a member of the Liberal Party but later became a Unionist.

He was a member of The Church of Scotland and was a church elder at Duddingston Kirk. A stained glass window to his memory is erected there (photograph above). He also helped found and build St. James's Church, at Rosefield Place, Portobello.

=== Recreations ===
He was active in outdoor and country sports while leading a busy professional life.

A keen fly fisherman for both trout and salmon. He was President of the Edinburgh Angling Club at the time of his death.

He was a regular follower of the Dumfriesshire Otter Hounds.

An ardent walker and good rower.

=== Wife and children ===
He married Jessie Andrew Ivison (1834–1912) in Renfrew in 1855. They had five children:

- William Ivison Macadam, born 27 January 1856 at 11 Brandon Street in Edinburgh and died 24 June 1902, Surgeon's Hall, Nicolson Street, Edinburgh. (He married Sarah McConnichie MacDonald, 28 Mar 1879).
- Helen Ann Cochran Macadam born 23 Jan 1859 at 11 Brandon Street, Edinburgh, Midlothian. (She married Dr John St Clair Boyd of Belfast, 1 November 1887 at Duddingston Parish Church).
- Jessie Margaret Mary Macadam, born 4 May 1862 at 25 Brighton Place, Portobello, Midlothian, Scotland and died 20 Jan 1943, 2 Strathearn Road, Edinburgh. (She married Alexander William Gordon Price on 5 July 1913, St Mark's Episcopal Church, Portobello).

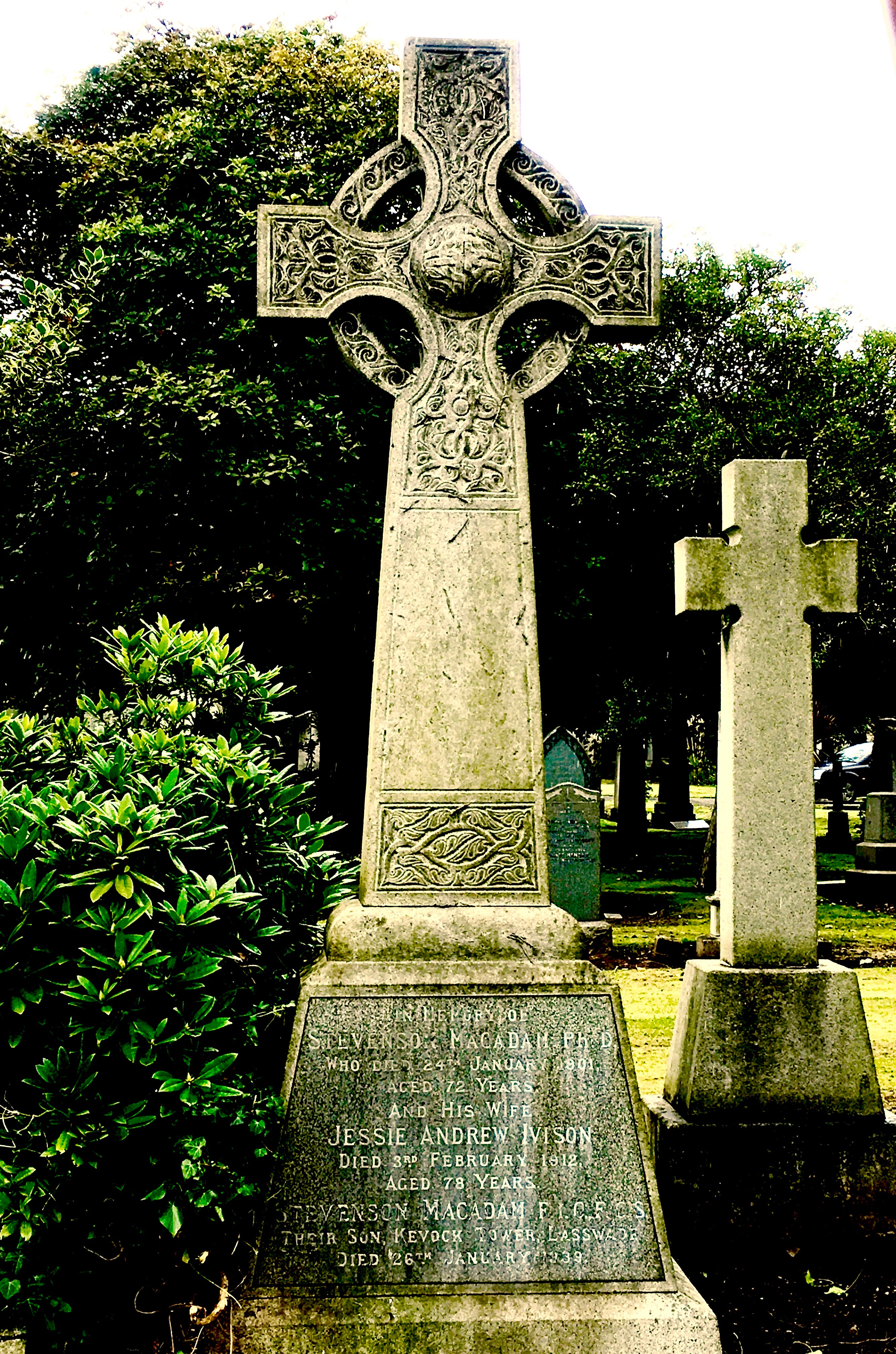
Stevenson Macadam and wife Jessie Andrew Ivison's grave Portobello Cemetery, Edinburgh, Scotland

- Stevenson John Charles George Macadam FIC FCS, born 30 January 1866 at 25 Brighton Place, Portobello, Midlothian, Scotland. He died 26 Jan 1939 at Kevock Tower, Lasswade, Scotland (a bachelor).
- Constance Elizabeth Louise Macadam, born 6 September 1867 at Brighton House, 11 Brighton Crescent, Portobello, Midlothian, Scotland and died on 28 August 1871 at Brighton House, Portobello (at less than five years old).

== Unexpected death ==
While fishing on the River Tweed at Clovenfords, a stretch of water belonging to the Edinburgh Angling Club, of which he was president, he injured himself, which resulted in blood poisoning and complications and he died rather unexpectedly a week later on 24 January 1901, aged 72.

He is buried in Portobello Cemetery in eastern Edinburgh. The grave (pictured) lies midway along the original eastern path (before the eastern extension). His wife and second son lie with him. His son William Ivison Macadam and grandson Sir Ivison Macadam lie around 20m to the south.
