= George Wilson (chemist) =

19th-century Scottish chemist and author

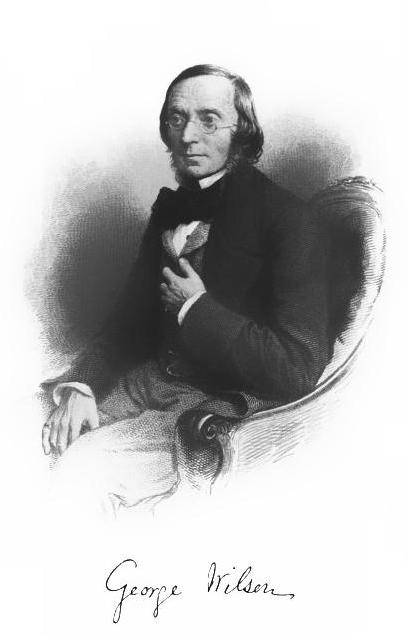
George Wilson engraved by Lumb Stocks

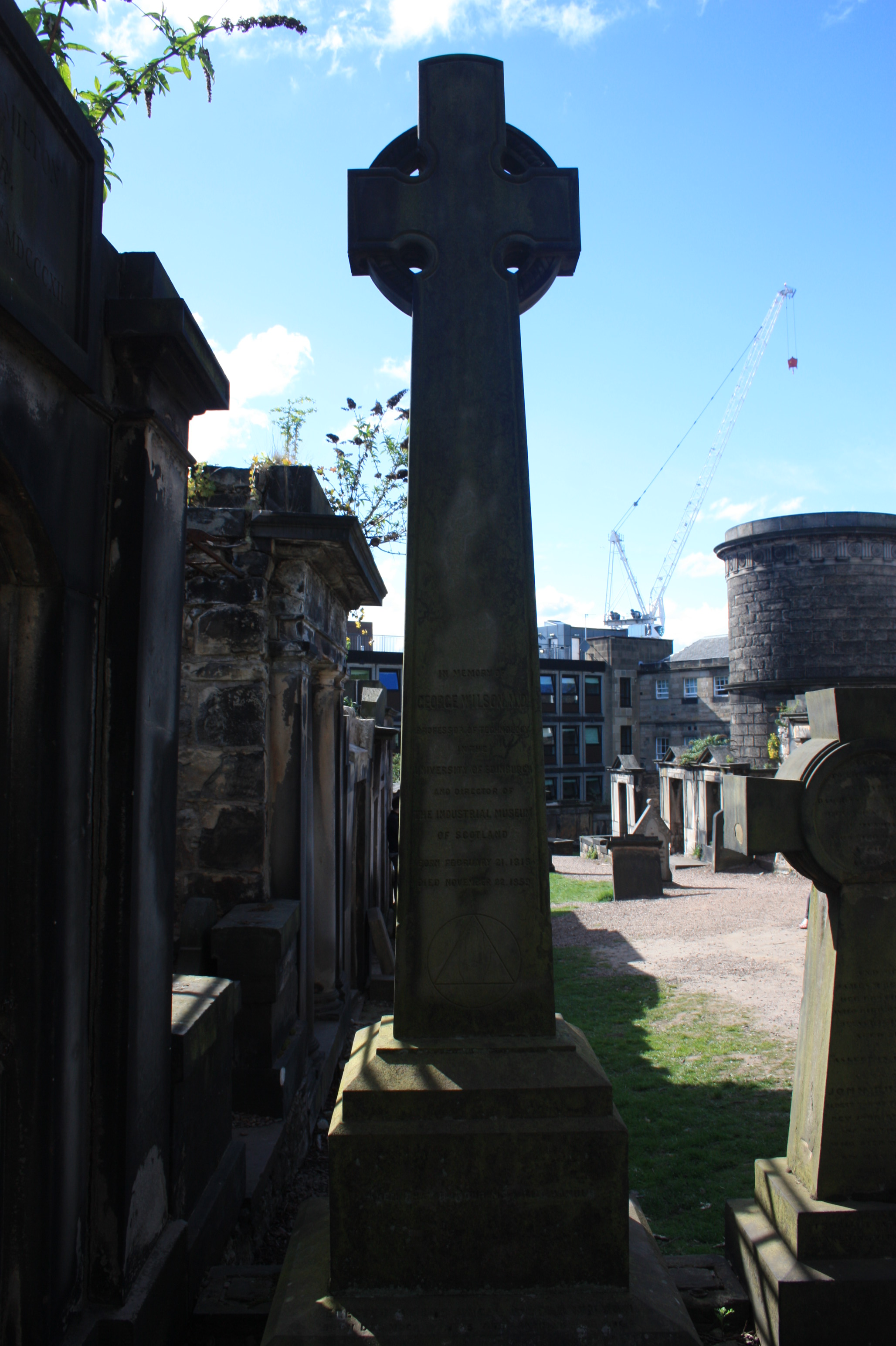
The grave of Prof George Wilson, Old Calton Cemetery

George Wilson PRSSA FRSE (21 February 1818 – 22 November 1859) was a 19th-century Scottish chemist and writer. He was Regius Professor of Technology at the University of Edinburgh, and the first director of the Industrial Museum of Scotland.

== Life ==
He was born in Edinburgh at 55 Potterow, the son of Archibald Wilson, a bookbinder, and his wife, Janet Aitken. He was the younger brother of the anthropologist Sir Daniel Wilson.

He was first educated at a small private school at 10 George Street in Edinburgh by George Knight, then from 1828 at the Royal High School and then studied medicine at Edinburgh University from 1832, studying under Thomas Charles Hope and Robert Christison. He was taught chemistry by Kenneth Kemp. From 1835 he undertook practical experience at Edinburgh Royal Infirmary on Drummond Street. In 1837 he became assistant to Christison. He also served as assistant editor on the "Maga" journal under Edward Forbes.

In 1838 he moved to London to join his brother Daniel, working (unpaid) under Thomas Graham, working alongside James Young and Lyon Playfair. Here he formed a lifelong friendship with one of his students: David Livingstone. He completed a doctoral thesis on haloid salts in 1839 and returned to Edinburgh.

He lectured in chemistry at the Royal College of Surgeons from 1840, and was appointed lecturer at the Veterinary College in 1843. In 1843, following an injury, his left foot was amputated by James Syme.

In 1845 he was elected a Fellow of the Royal Society of Edinburgh. His proposers was Sir Robert Christison. He served as President of Royal Scottish Society of Arts between 1855 and 1857.

On the establishment of the Industrial Museum of Scotland in 1855, Wilson was appointed its director. He recruited expatriate Scots from around the world to send back specimens for the national collection, and gave many public lectures. Though battling ill health, he served in the directorship for four years until his death.

In 1855 he was created Professor of Technology at Edinburgh University. In 1858 he declined the chair in Chemistry (in succession to William Gregory) due to ill-health.

He died at his home, Elm Cottage on Whitehouse Loan in south Edinburgh on 22 November 1859, of pleuropneumonia, which developed following a cold.

He was buried in the Old Calton Burial Ground on 28 November. The grave lies next to the southmost vaults.

== Family ==
His twin brother John died in 1836.

His sister Jessie Aitken Wilson married James Sime.

== Works ==
- On the Employment of Oxygen as a Means of Resuscitation in Asphyxia (1845)
- Life of Henry Cavendish (1851)
- Life of Dr John Reid (1852)
- Researches on Colour-Blindness (1855) - this led to compulsory testing for colour-blindness in many critical jobs
- The Senses; or, Gateways to Knowledge (1856)

Three works were published posthumously:

- Counsels of an Invalid (1862)
- Memoir of Edward Forbes (1862)
- Religio Chemici (1862)

He co-authored Inorganic Chemistry with Stevenson Macadam.
