= William Ivison Macadam =

Scottish scientist

Colonel William Ivison Macadam FRSE FRSSA FRSA FIC FSA
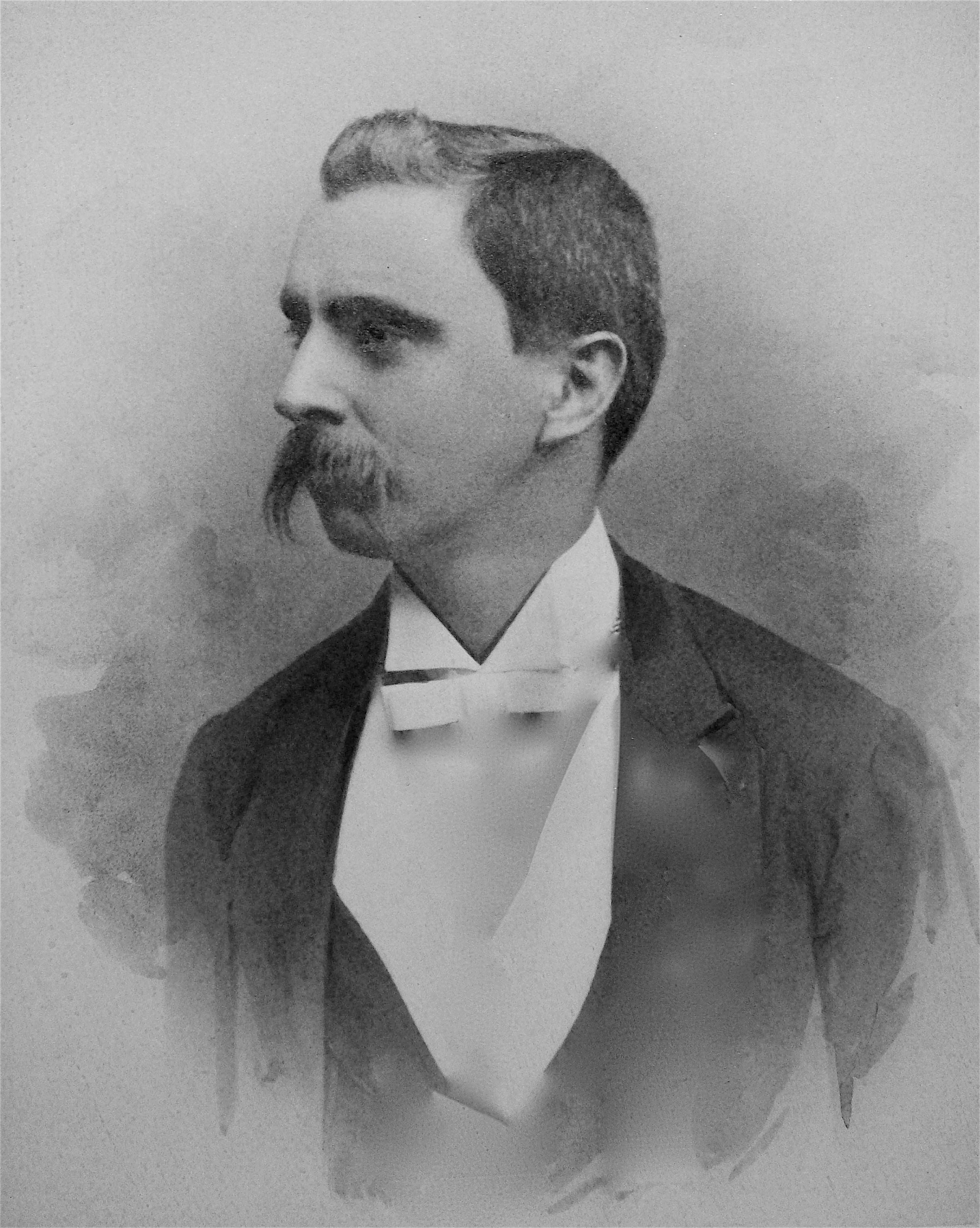

Col. Royal Scots Forth Volunteer Infantry Brigade & Col. 1st Lothians

Personal details
- Born: William Ivison Macadam; 27 January 1856 Edinburgh, Scotland, United Kingdom
- Died: 24 June 1902 (aged 46) Edinburgh, Scotland, United Kingdom
- Spouse: Sarah Maconochie Macdonald
- Education: Edinburgh Collegiate School; Heidelberg University
- Occupation: Scottish Scientist (analytical chemistry), Professor and Academic Author

William Ivison Macadam VD FRSE FSA FIC FCS FRSSA (27 January 1856 – 24 June 1902) was a Scottish scientist, academic author and antiquarian. He was also Colonel of the 1st Lothian Volunteer Infantry Brigade and a leading Freemason. On 24 June 1902 he was shot and killed, along with a student, by a mentally disturbed gunman in his own laboratory at Surgeons' Hall, Edinburgh.

The Scotsman ran a contemporary view of him the day after his death: "Few men were more widely known in Edinburgh or more affectionately regarded than was Colonel Ivison Macadam. He was a man of varied interests. To scientific men he was known as a clever and highly qualified analytical chemist, an able and interesting lecturer on that subject, and a prominent and useful member of learned societies. Among Freemasons he was known as one of the most enthusiastic members of the craft, and a leading officer in many of its orders. But it was as a Volunteer that he is most widely known to the general public. Latterly his appointment as brigade-major for the 1st Lothian Volunteer Brigade brought him in touch with both the regular and the volunteer officers of the district, and by all he was admired and respected alike for his genial personal qualities, his sound military instincts and accomplishments, his organising abilities, and his capacity for hard work. The tragedy of his death was deepened by the fact that it came on the day when he was to command a special representative Volunteer Battalion to take part in the Coronation celebrations.

== Early life ==
He was born at 11 Brandon Street, a Georgian townhouse near the Water of Leith in Edinburgh's Second New Town. He was the eldest son of Stevenson Macadam. The family moved to Brighton House, 25 Brighton Place in Portobello when he was four years old.

He was educated at the Royal High School, Edinburgh and The Edinburgh Collegiate School and at Heidelberg University, Germany, where he studied with Professor Robert Bunsen inventor of the Bunsen Burner.

== Academic career ==
Macadam followed in his father's footsteps and began lecturing to both medical and veterinary students in 1873. From 1901 he was based at Surgeon's Hall in Edinburgh, the headquarters of the Royal College of Surgeons of Edinburgh, the oldest medical corporation in the world. He became associated with his father, Dr. Stevenson Macadam, 'a well-known analytical chemist and lecturer on chemistry in his work at Surgeons' Hall Laboratory. He rapidly became known as a coadjutor to his father. He also subsequently became a lecturer in chemistry and agricultural chemistry, School of Medicine, Edinburgh.

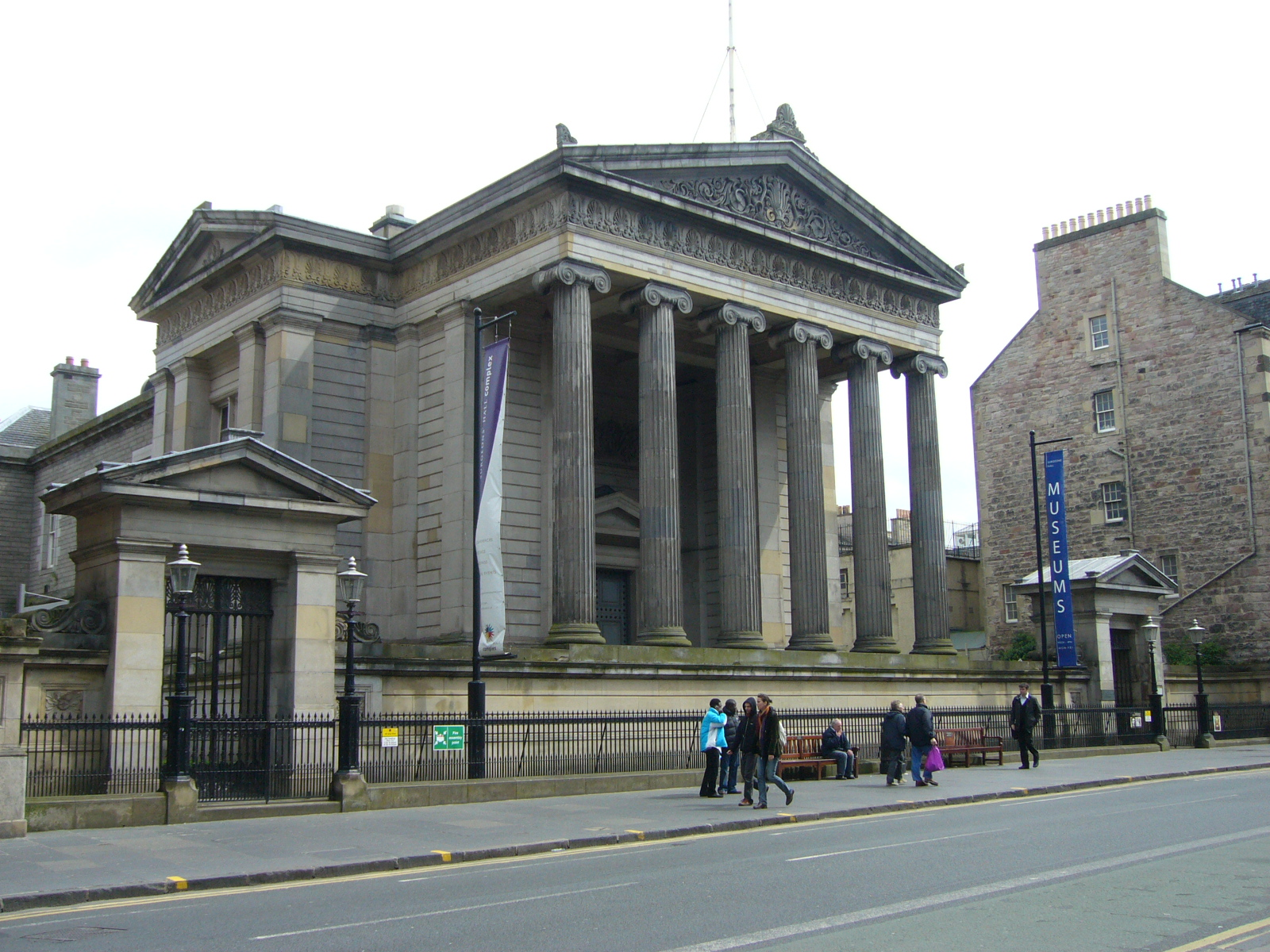
Surgeons' Hall, Nicolson Street Edinburgh

In 1873 he joined the staff of the New Veterinary College when he became assistant to his father. In 1880 he was appointed Professor of Chemistry there when Dr. Stevenson Macadam retired, an appointment he held until his death.

His work gained recognition from many learned societies, and he contributed numerous papers to these.

The college journal obituary described him as "a man of great ability, and [he] had a profound knowledge of his subject. He had an excellent way with young students, and made the learning of chemistry a pleasant task. There was also a frank bonhomie about Macadam. And no one was better at telling a good story in the volunteer camp or at the dinner table."

=== Encouragement of women ===
Macadam was ahead of his time in the teaching of women and encouraging them to participate in courses and degrees, particularly at Surgeons' Hall and the New Veterinary College, Edinburgh, despite women being banned from attendance at his or other's university lectures and from taking academic degrees at most universities and colleges in Great Britain. Most professors and all-male student classes objected to their participation in the academic professions at the time.

Edinburgh with its famous Medical School became a centre of controversy over medical education for women and Macadam championed the women's cause. At the time women were not admitted to either theoretical or practical classes at Edinburgh University although they could sit for examinations.

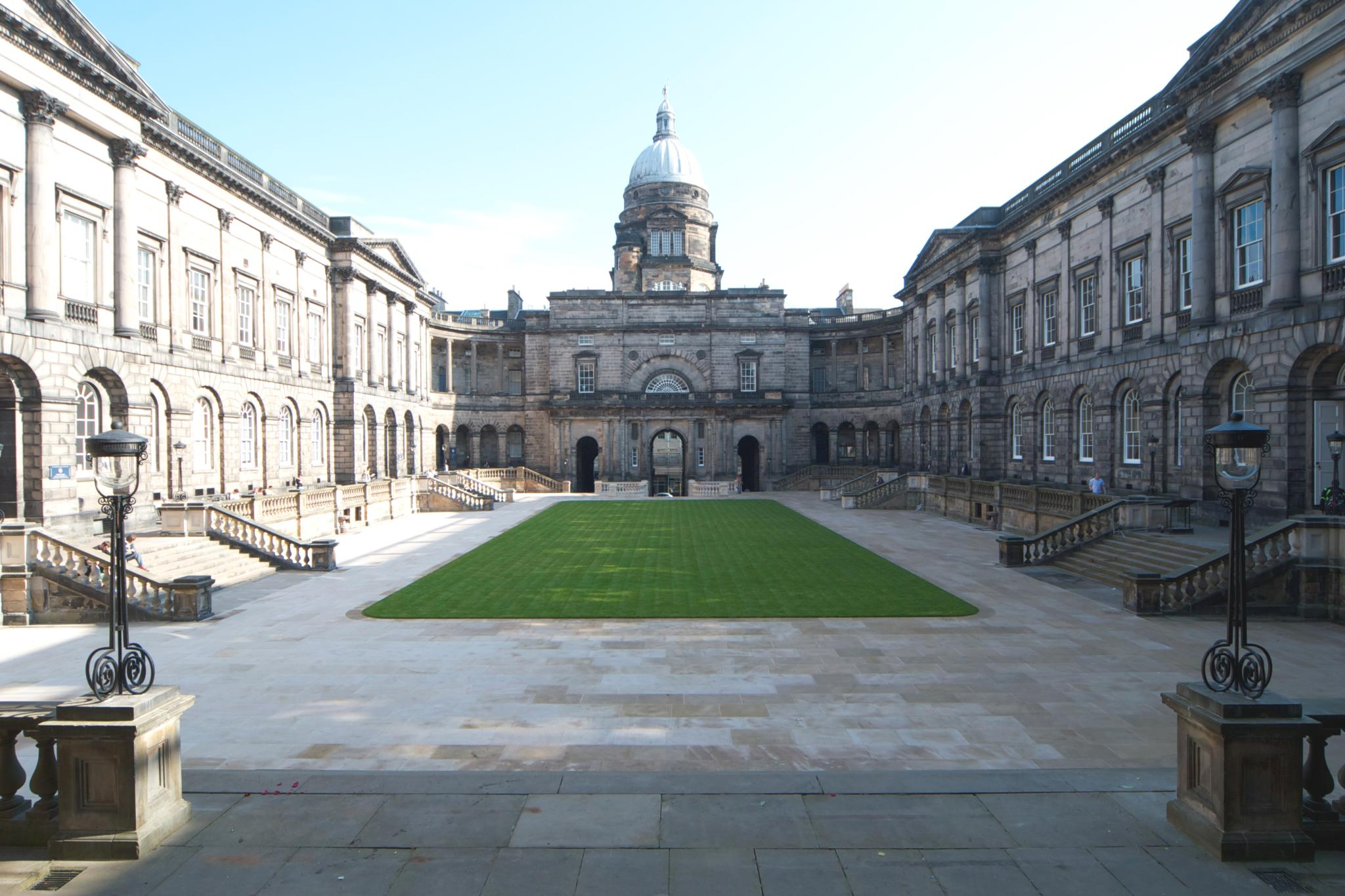
University of Edinburgh Old College Quad

To overcome these difficulties the pioneer of medical education for women Sophia Jex-Blake established the Edinburgh School of Medicine for Women in Surgeons' Square in 1886. Professor Macadam took over the teaching of chemistry there before starting his own classes for women at Surgeons' Hall in 1887. The first set of women medical students he taught in this pioneering role included a number going on to be medical missionaries. He also taught chemistry at the Edinburgh College of Medicine for Women which had been established in Chambers Street by John Inglis and his daughter Elsie Inglis. These classes were in addition to his large classes of male medical and dental students at Surgeons' Hall for the Royal College of Surgeons of Edinburgh and for Edinburgh University.

He also became Professor of Chemistry at the New Veterinary College. A woman student in due course presented herself. The college authorities were worried about permitting women to take classes but he helped persuade them that she should. This first woman he encouraged and taught there was Aleen Cust, who became the first woman veterinary surgeon in Great Britain, and was his student at the New Veterinary College. She completed her veterinary studies in 1897, winning the Gold medal for Zoology. However, the Royal College of Veterinary Surgeons in London had disagreed in their allowing women admission to the college and would not agree to a woman taking the final examination. They consequently refused to admit and license her. This was challenged in the Court of Session in Edinburgh, seeking to overturn the decision of the RCVS examination committee, but the court declined to rule on the basis that the RCVS was not domiciled in Scotland.

Nevertheless, with recommendations from the New Veterinary College faculty she joined a new practice in Ireland, which she assumed responsibility for after the death of the principal. After her voluntary service on the front with the British armed forces in the First World War attending wounded, maimed and lame war horses, and the enactment of the Sex Disqualification (Removal) Act 1919, she was finally presented with her diploma by the President of the Royal College of Veterinary Surgeons in London on 21 December 1922, thus officially becoming the first woman Veterinary Surgeon in Great Britain in spite of over twenty years of having already practised.

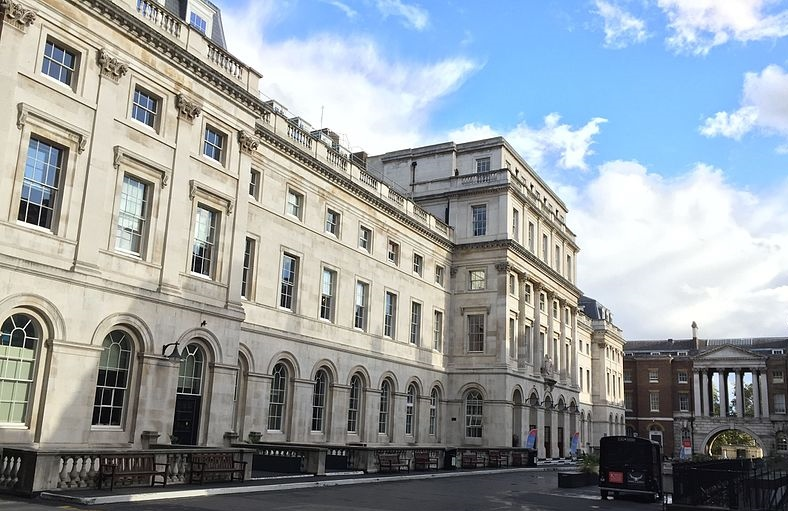
King's College, London (KCL)

Macadam also encouraged and initially taught his own daughter Elison Ann Macadam (1862-1965), later FIC, at Surgeons' Hall. He appointed her as one of his student assistants there, which meant there was a woman assistant, and not only his male assistants, to make his classes seem more welcoming to women and also show that it was not just men who were qualified for the work. Elison Macadam, after his death, went on to become the first woman to graduate from King's College, London. She later became the first woman to graduate in Chemistry at King's College London, in spite of their rule against women. After her graduation Elison worked in the chemical laboratory as Assistant to Professor A. K. Huntington, Professor of Metallurgy at King's. Later her daughter Rosalind Desch (1913–1994) carried on this tradition of educating women and went on to build The Study School into a leading all-girls school in Wimbledon, London and it was through her that many thousands of women received an important early education. Before her death, she saw that its future was protected by making it over into a charitable education foundation so that the school would continue.

== Military career ==
His career as a Volunteer army officer extended over a period of 27 years.

In 1875, as a young man he joined the 5th (Leith) Volunteer Battalion of the Royal Scots Guards and largely on his initiative, a company of that regiment was raised in Portobello. During the twelve years he was captain it was noted for its strength and efficiency. He was in charge of testing and analysis of artillery ammunition for the army in Scotland. As a major he commanded the important tactical field days and was in charge of the defence of the Blackford Hill high point in Edinburgh during the post-Crimean War period with the resulting protracted Anglo-Russia tensions. He later became commandant of the battalion 1892–1896. (This battalion after his death was to be involved in the Quintinshill rail disaster in 1915 on the way to Gallipoli, the worst rail disaster in British history with a great part of the regiment killed. An annual remembrance is held in Edinburgh's Rosebank Cemetery.)

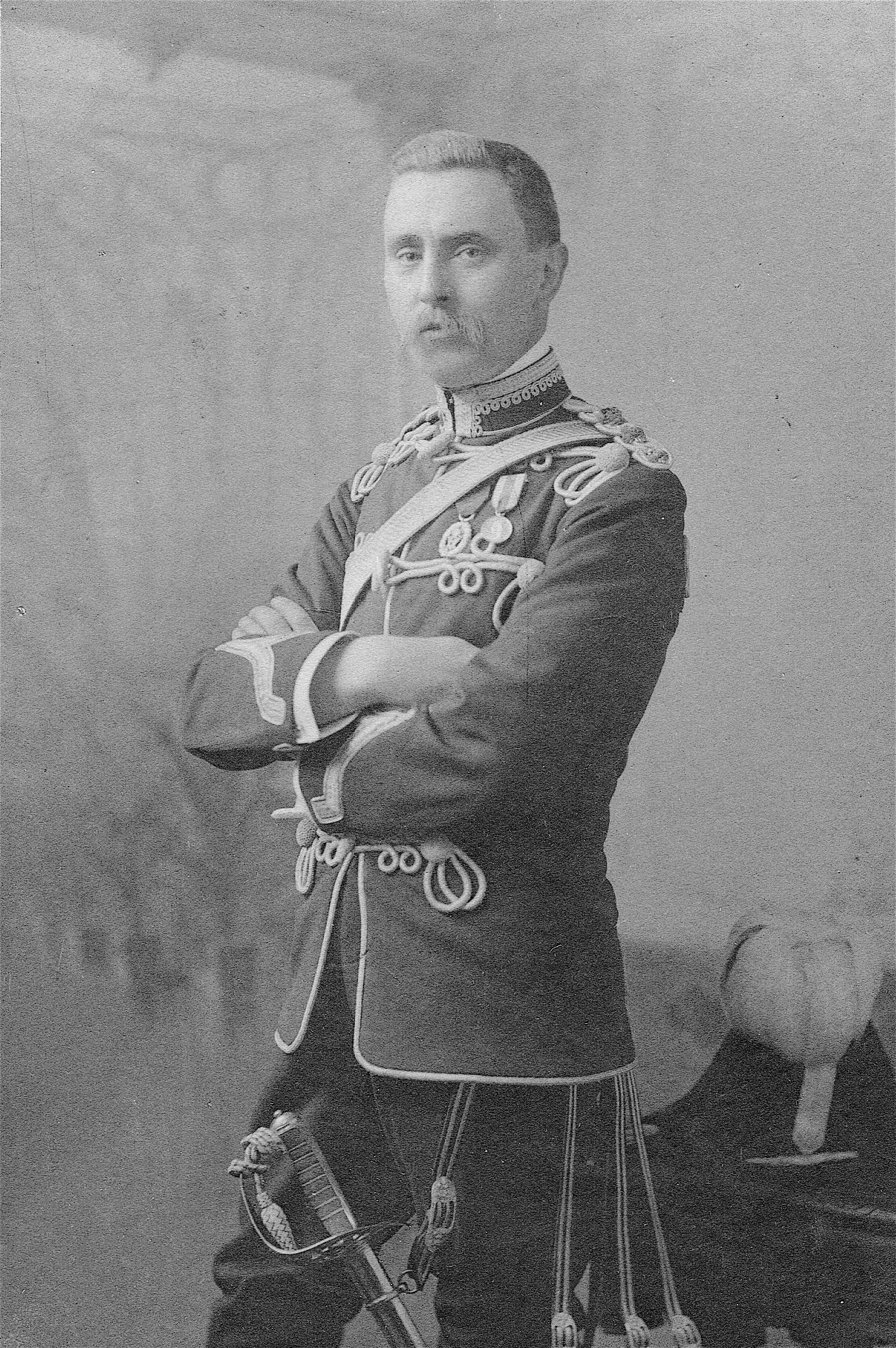
Col. William Ivison Macadam, Royal Scots Forth VI Brigade

In July 1896 he succeeded Colonel Cranston as brigade-major of the Royal Scots Forth Volunteer Infantry Brigade as their colonel. As such he took the battalion to Queen Victoria's Diamond Jubilee in 1897, where he led them in the procession. They had embarked and were barracked on a ship he chartered from Leith to London, where it remained moored on the Victoria Embankment on the Thames throughout the celebrations.

He subsequently was appointed colonel in command on the reformation of the brigade as the 1st Lothians.

In 1902 Colonel Macadam was appointed commander of the Second Scottish Volunteer Coronation Battalion for Edward VII's coronation. It was intended that he lead the regiment at the coronation celebrations and he had again chartered a ship to transport the battalion to the coronation in London on the day of his death. The coronation had to be postponed the day he was killed on account of the King's appendicitis emergency.

== Learned societies ==
Fellow 1888 of the Royal Society of Edinburgh. (Scotland's National Academy of Science and Letters) to which his father, Stevenson Macadam, had also been elected a fellow in 1855, as subsequently was his son Ivison Macadam in 1945.

Fellow (President 1899–1901) of the Royal Scottish Society of the Arts, (his father Stevenson Macadam was an earlier president 1862–64).

Fellow of the Chemical Society of London.

Fellow of the Institute of Chemistry.

Fellow of the Society of Arts, London (later became Royal Society of Arts).

Fellow of the Mineralogical Society of Great Britain and Ireland.

Fellow of the Royal Physical Society of Edinburgh.

Fellow of the Edinburgh Geological Society

Fellow of the Botanical Society, Edinburgh. Later became Botanical Society of Scotland.

Fellow of the Society of Antiquaries of London.

== Freemasons ==
Macadam was a leading office holder in the Freemasons in Edinburgh and Scotland, involved in a number of lodges, as a Grand Master in the movement and in both the Grand Lodge and Depute Grand Principal of the Supreme Grand Royal Arch Chapter of Scotland. He oversaw the erection of new Masonic Halls on Queen Street, which were marked by formal ceremonial hand over by him to the Order.

== Publications and papers given before learned societies (partial list) ==
He wrote at least fifty papers and probably far exceeded that number for various Learned Societies. Some of these show how varied and wide were his areas of expertise:

- On the chemical composition of California Wine (published 1878)
- On the presence of "Daphnia Pulex" and "Cyclops Quadricornis" in Domestic water supply (1877)
- Notes with Analyses of a Series of Church Tokens from Various Parishes (1880)
- Notes on the Ancient Iron Industry of Scotland (1886)
- Manures, Natural and Artificial (1888)
- Tables for the Detection of Simple Salts (1890)
- Gairloch in North-West Ross-shire Chapter X; Minerals of Gairloch
- On the Analysis of certain Rocks from Salisbury Crags (south side) (18 December 1879, Edinburgh Geological Society)
- Analyses of Coals from New Zealand and Labuan (19 January 1882, Edinburgh Geological Society)
- On the Chemical Composition of a Nodule of Ozokerite found in Kinghorn-ness (British Association for the Advancement of Science, 49th. Meeting, Sheffield, 1879).
- Notes on Ancient Structures in the Islands of Seil and Luing, and the North Garbh Island: With Preliminary notice of the North Fort of Luing
- Analysis of Bronzes

== Death ==
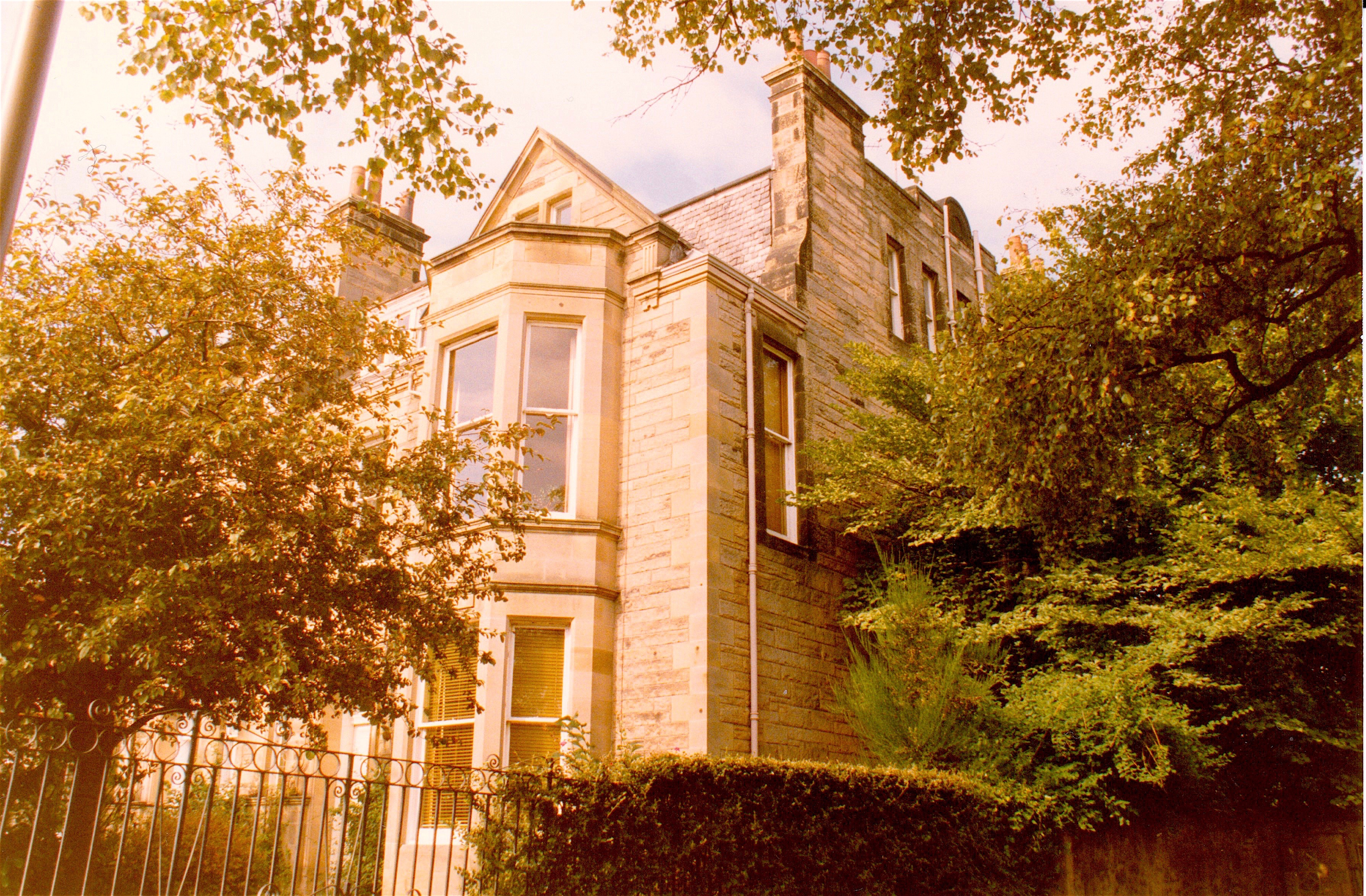
William Ivison Macadam's Edinburgh house Slioch, 3 Lady Road, Edinburgh.

Macadam was shot in the back and instantly killed on 24 June 1902, aged 46, in the laboratory of Surgeons' Hall by Daniel M'Clinton, a porter employed there. The laboratory assistant James Kirkcaldy then entered the room. M'Clinton fired on him and he fell behind a desk but was not injured. A student James Bell Forbes then entered and was mortally wounded and died a few hours later. M'Clinton, was an army pensioner who had apparently planned more victims but was persuaded to surrender his brigade rifle by Stevenson Macadam, Colonel Macadam's younger brother. M'Clinton was later charged with double murder, which then carried the death penalty, but at trial was convicted of a lesser charge owing to his impaired mental state.

The Scotsman reported "TERRIBLE TRAGEDY IN EDINBURGH: Colonel Ivison Macadam and a Student Murdered", "The news, spread with great rapidity, caused the most profound regret. At first, indeed it was hardly credited, for those who had seen Colonel Macadam only a few hours previously the picture of health and energy, it seemed impossible to believe that one who was so general a favourite had been laid low by a murderous hand. To his military friends especially his death was a painful shock. He had been prominently [involved] with the detachment going to London in connection with the Coronation, having been appointed commander of the Second Scottish Volunteer Coronation Battalion, and he was to have sailed with his men in the afternoon...."

The shooting was met with widespread distress in Edinburgh at the time. Colonel Macadam's death, the succeeding large military funeral, with wide participation from the general public, and the subsequent trial of the assailant received extensive coverage in the Edinburgh papers.

The day he was killed the colonel had been planning to lead his battalion's embarkation on a ship he had chartered for their transport for the Coronation of Edward VII, planned for 26 June 1902 but postponed the very day he was killed because of the king's illness.

"A pathetic touch was given to the tragedy when two of Colonel Macadam's daughters appeared on the scene and were informed of the dreadful circumstances. Shortly after Colonel Macadam's son [Barkly Macadam, his eldest son] also appeared, dressed in military uniform for the purpose of travelling to London along with his father. The relatives… were completely overcome…and only remained for a few minutes…"

=== Funeral ===
Macadam's funeral was reported to have been one of the largest seen in Edinburgh at the time with over 1000 troops, many carriages and tens of thousands of people turning out. The papers covered the funeral extensively.

The Scotsman reported "The Late Colonel Ivison Macadam: Imposing Public Funeral", "With military honours befitting his rank … the funeral was an extraordinary demonstration of public sympathy … From the house the coffin was carried by eight sergeants to a gun carriage provided by the Edinburgh City Artillery and drawn by six horses with riders. On the coffin was placed the deceased hat and sword. It was a four-mile procession from his house at Lady Road to Portobello Cemetery to the solemn strains of the Dead March from 'Saul' heard swelling in the distance... as the escort ... proceeded in slow step..."

The Edinburgh Evening Dispatch reported "Edinburgh Tragedy: Funeral of Colonel Macadam: Thousands of Spectators", "...the public turn[ed] out in such numbers as they did today to witness the last tribute of respect ... of Lieutenant-Colonel Macadam. The crowd could be counted not by the thousands but by the tens of thousands. They poured down Newington Road and Old Dalkeith Road in a long continuous stream one and a half hours before the time fixed for the funeral [2pm], some on foot, some in cabs and some in cable cars. Such a throng ... that the police on the scene found considerable difficulty in coping with it.

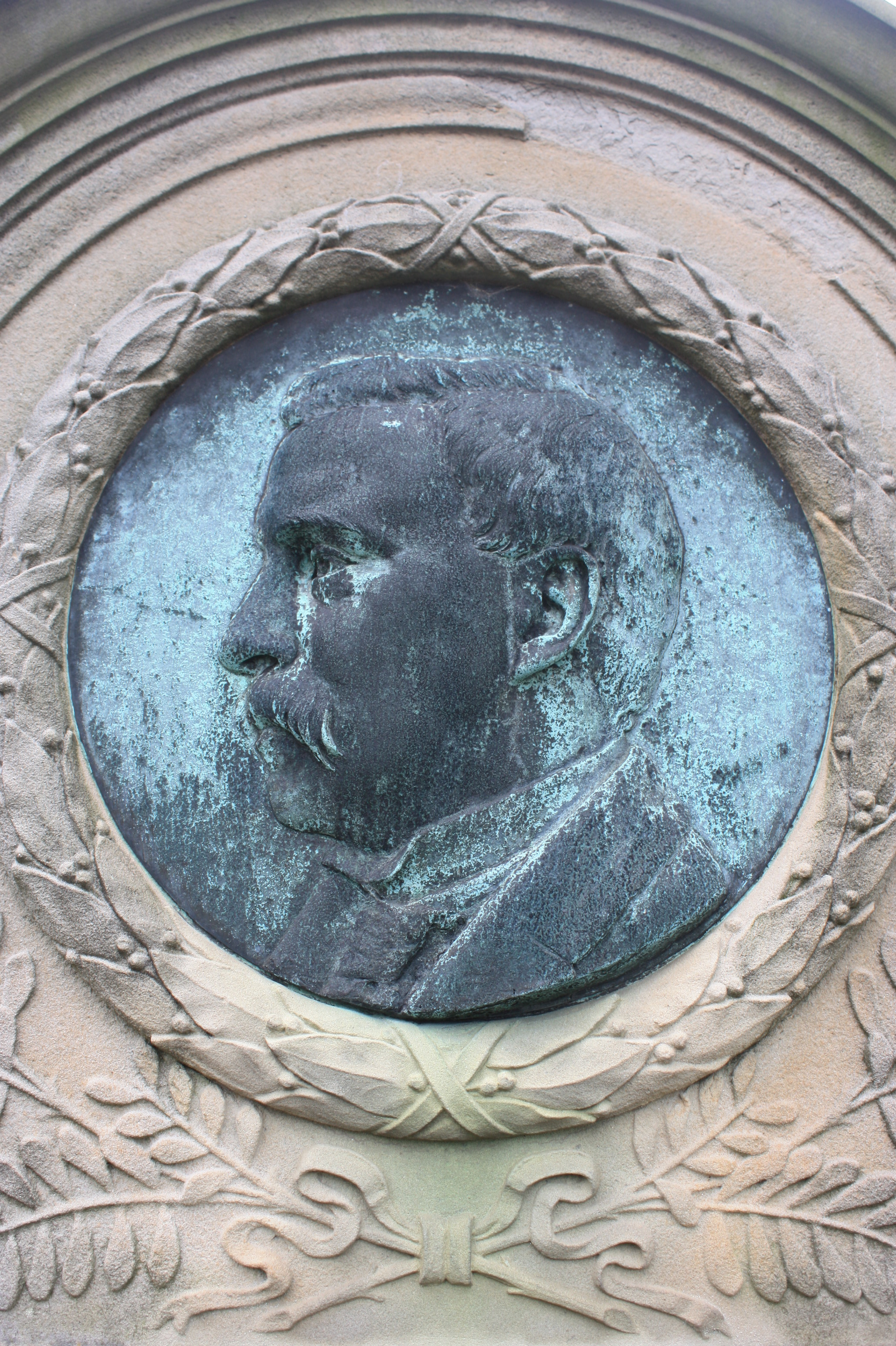
William Ivison Macadam by William Grant Stevenson

They had to clear the one end of Lady Road entirely ... Marching in came a big representation of ... the colonel's own regiment ... carrying their rifles reversed ... the coffin saluted everywhere ... by the crowds waiting for its passing. Behind the gun carriage, which was drawn by six horses, was led the officer's charger, which he rode only a few days ago at the inspection in Holyrood Park, while behind it again came several mourning coaches ... Thousands of people—men women and children, many in working dress, some in holiday attire, a considerable number in mourning, followed the procession all the way to the Portobello Cemetery. Through the entire [four mile] route, crowds by the wayside allowed the cortege to pass and then fell in and swelled the procession."

The Coronation of Edward VII, postponed owing to the king's emergency appendicitis, meant the coronation decorations were up along most of the funeral route: "All sort and conditions of people were there and it seemed the sad nature of the ceremony fell in with their mood on a day when the Coronation festivities and the intercessory services [for the king] were strangely intermingled." When the procession had traversed the four-mile route and reached the cemetery "… the Volunteers lined the walks, and the general public crowded every other inch of space".

The Scotsman concluded, "Amid the solemn silence the clergyman [finished]. Then in the stillness, the voice of Colonel Sir John Clarke rang out – 'Present arms; the escort will fire three volleys; ready.' For a second there was the irregular clicking of rifles being loaded, and then almost simultaneously with the word 'Fire' rang out the report of 500 rifles, followed by a brief wail from the pipes. Two more volleys were fired, and the military honours concluded with ... The Last Post." ..."

Macadam was buried with full military honours beside his late father and other family in Portobello Cemetery. A very large crowd watched the spectacle. The grave stands in the south-east section of the original cemetery near the south end of the eastmost path.

=== Trial of the assailant ===
The subsequent trial of the assailant on 17 and 18 September 1902 was covered by The Scotsman at length over the two days of the trial. M'Clinton was charged with double murder. He had a long service (21 years) in the Army Volunteers and was "a most efficient and faithful servant." He was a good marksman and it was not thought unusual for an Army Volunteer to turn up at Surgeons' Hall with his rifle and military cartridge bag before the shooting. His wife when he returned home to fetch them thought he was going for target practice.

However, his wife, friends and close army colleagues testified he had been having delusional fears for some time, imagining people following him who were out to get him, he believed his friends and neighbours across the street were watching or following him; that people were plotting against him. He thought his wife was telling people about him. He thought two detectives were shadowing him and planning to trap him. When visited by friends "he would watch and nobody knew when to speak to him. He muttered and pulled his moustache". He had had these delusions for variously over a year to two years and they grew more intense. A number of friends had suggested that medical help was needed but it was deferred.

While he had been charged with double murder, which was then a capital offence, his Defence pleaded "Not Guilty as a result of Insanity". These symptoms would today likely be readily recognised and diagnosed as a not uncommon form of mental illness.

The judge in his Charge to the Jury had instructed them "Accused persons were always presumed to be sane until the opposite was proved. Accordingly it was for the defence to establish that the prisoner was suffering, not only from insanity, but from insanity of such a kind and quality that he could not be held morally responsible for his acts, before the defence in the present case could succeed."

There was no apparent motive for murder and while there had been overwhelming testimony of a disturbed mind, the jury obviously were not convinced that the defence had established the last form of insanity. So the jury convicted him of the other verdict available to them of Culpable Homicide and life in prison.

== Family ==
=== Marriage ===
Macadam married Sarah Maconochie Macdonald, on 28 March 1879. She was born on 10 July 1855 at Stewart Hall, near Rothesay, Bute. She died on 4 April 1941 in Edinburgh.

She was the daughter of John Barkly Macdonald, of Stewart Hall, Bute where he farmed and was an owner of properties on the Island of Grenada, West Indies. He was born in Glasgow on 22 August 1808 and died on 26 December 1855, a few months after his daughter Sarah was born. After his return to Scotland from Grenada he had married for a second time on 5 July 1844 in Rothesay, Mary McConechy—aged 33 who had been born at Windy Hall, Bute. His parents were John and Sarah Macdonald of Trinidad and Grenada who were living at Claremont Square, London at the time of the senior John's death.

Macadam and his family first lived at 6 Brighton Crescent, Portobello and later at "Slioch" on Lady Road in the Craigmillar Park area on the south side of Edinburgh.

He was generally known by his middle name Ivison. He was a keen fly fisherman, shot and outdoorsman.

=== Children ===
Macadam and Sarah had six children (one dying in infancy):

Mary Janetta Macadam, known as Myra (Born: 3 February 1880 at Stanley Road, Portobello. Died 5 April 1948 and buried at Kirkby Cemetery Frinton, Essex).

Elison Ann Macadam (Born, 6 May 1882 at 6 Brighton Crescent, Portobello. Died in 1965 at Wimbledon, London. Married January 1909 Dr. Cecil Desch (1874–1958)

Stevenson Macadam (Born 24 April 1884 at 6 Brighton Crescent, Portobello. Died an infant 22 November 1884 at Portobello).

John Barkly Macadam, known as Barkly, (Born 15 November 1885 at 6 Brighton Crescent, Portobello. Died 10 April 1968 at Guildford, Surrey). Married on 3 October 1912 Jane (Janie) Butler Babbage (Born 25 June 1888 at Fremington, Devon. Died 5 April 1985 at Crowthorne, Berkshire).

Sarah Constance Macadam (Born 29 January 1889 at 6 East Brighton Crescent, Portobello. Died 1964 at The Chantry, Ely, Cambridgeshire. Married Robert Wheatley (1888–1968) on 27 January 1917 at St John's Episcopal Church, Edinburgh.

Ivison Stevenson Macadam (Born 18 July 1894 at Slioch, Lady Road, Edinburgh. Died 22 December 1974 at 16 Upper Belgrave Street, Westminster, London). Married 1 January 1934 Caroline Ladd Corbett at 01600 SW Greenwood Road, Dunthorpe, Multnomah Co., Portland, Oregon US (Born 20 September 1910 at Portland, Oregon US. Died on 28 August 1989 in East Runton, Norfolk).

== Memorials ==
=== Royal Scots ===
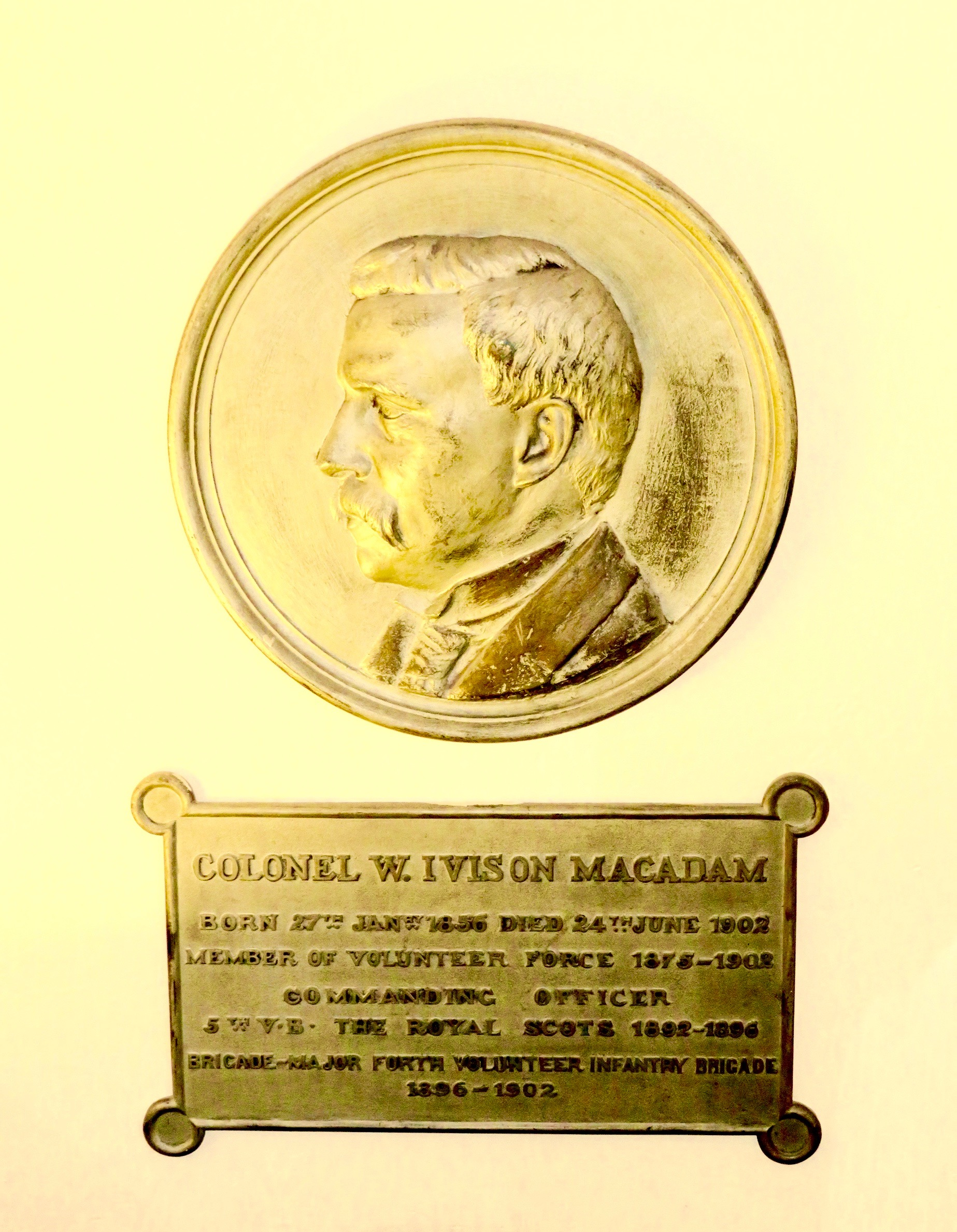
The Royal Scots monument to Colonel Macadam was unveiled at Dalmeny Street Drill Hall, Leith on 21 December 1903. On the Hall's demolition, it was moved to its present site at Hepburn House Army Reserve Centre, 89 East Claremont Street, Edinburgh.

A mural monument with a bronze medallion portrait of Colonel Macadam in semi-relief with inscription plate was unveiled at the Royal Scots Dalmeny Street Drill Hall, Leith at the entrance to the building by Sir John Macdonald, Lord Kingsburgh, Lord Advocate on 21 December 1903. Among those present at the ceremony were Sir Charles Tucker, K.C.B., Commanding the Forces in Scotland and numerous army officers and men as well as Mr. Barkly Macadam, the eldest son of the deceased. The memorial was designed by W. Grant Stevenson RSA (opposite).

Sir John Macdonald said in his address that he felt it a hard task to speak. Colonel Macadam was one of his oldest friends and there was no man he remembered with greater regard. During the latter years of his life he was in closer association with him in practical work than any other man ... he should never forget the energy and zeal he displayed and the extraordinary work he went through ... if all the young recruits and all associated with the battalion in future looked on that monument with the earnest desire that they might do their duty as Volunteers with the same energy and zeal and ability ... the corps would be sure to thrive and be an example to all Volunteer corps in the kingdom ...Sir John then unveiled the monument, amid applause and handed it over to Colonel Salvesen, representing the battalion. (This Memorial to Colonel Macadam was moved to Hepburn House Army Reserve Centre, 89 East Claremont Street, Edinburgh (New Town)—formerly The Royal Scots TA HQ, East Claremont St—when Dalmeny Street Drill Hall was closed).

=== Cemetery ===
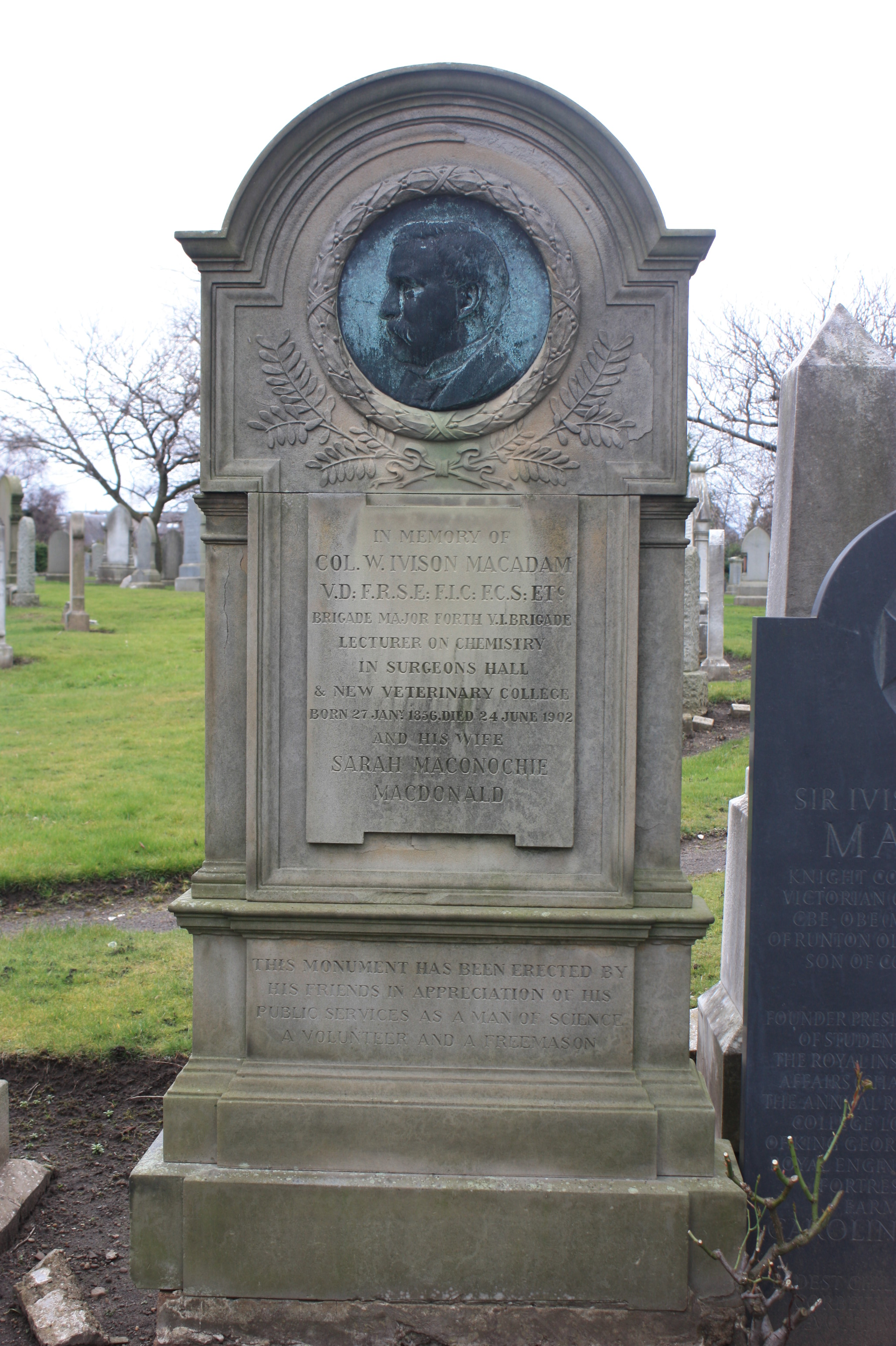
The grave of William Ivison Macadam, Portobello Cemetery, Edinburgh

On the following day, 22 December 1903, a monument in Portobello Cemetery was unveiled by Sir John Halliday, M.D., vice-president of the Royal College of Surgeons, at the Colonel's grave. This with a bronze likeness of Colonel Macadam is in grey stone and was also designed by the colonel's friend W. Grant Stevenson RSA.

A third memorial was a fund for an annual prize to be given at Surgeons' Hall.

These three memorials were provided in Colonel Macadam's memory through a subscription.
