= Shona Kinloch =

Scottish artist

- Born: 1962 (age 63–64)
- Education: Glasgow School of Art
- Known for: Sculpture
- Spouse: Gary Anderson

Shona Kinloch (born 1962) is a Scottish artist based in East Kilbride who specialises in sculpture.

== Education ==
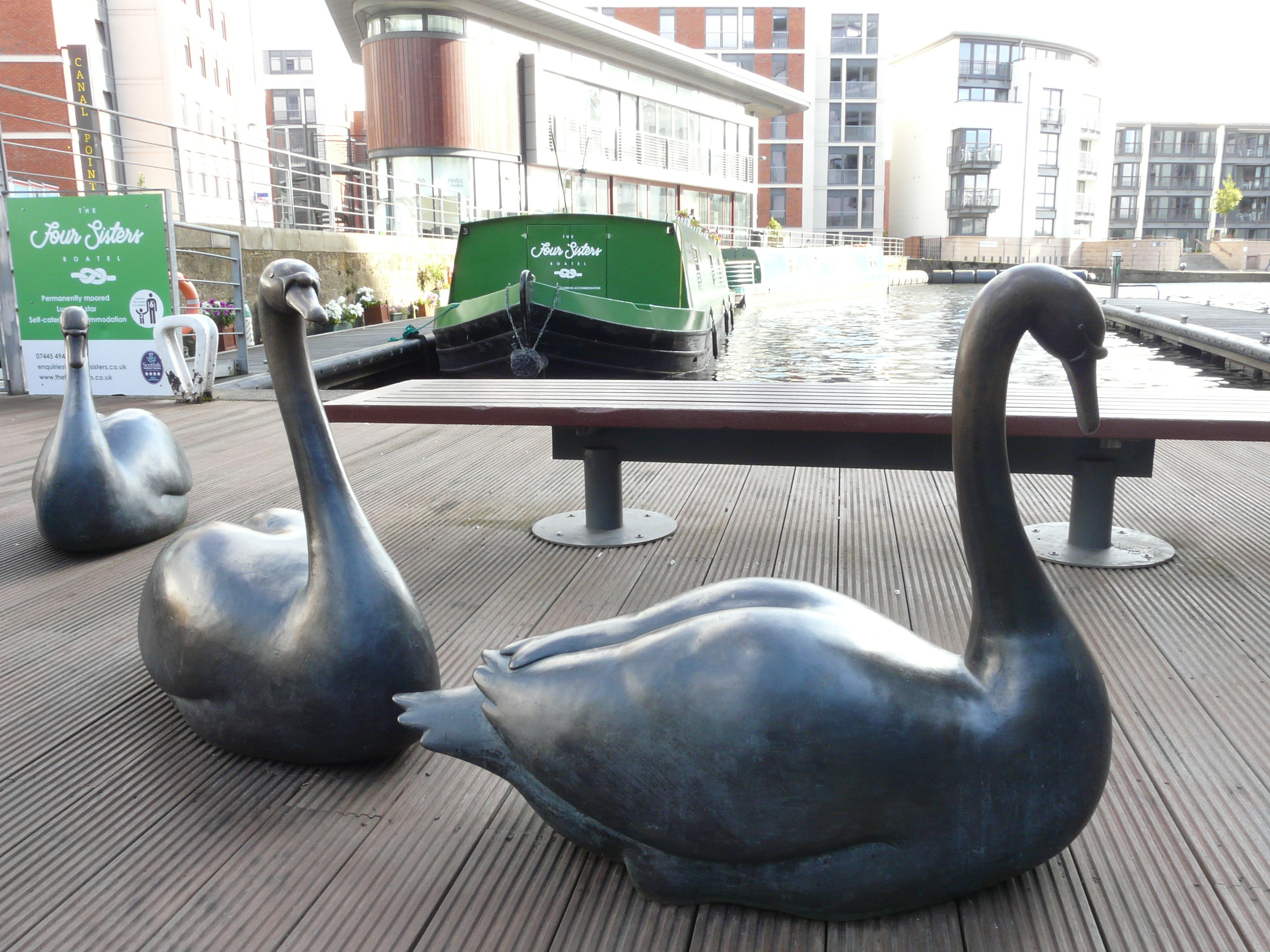
Bronze Swans by Shona Kinloch, Fountainbridge Square

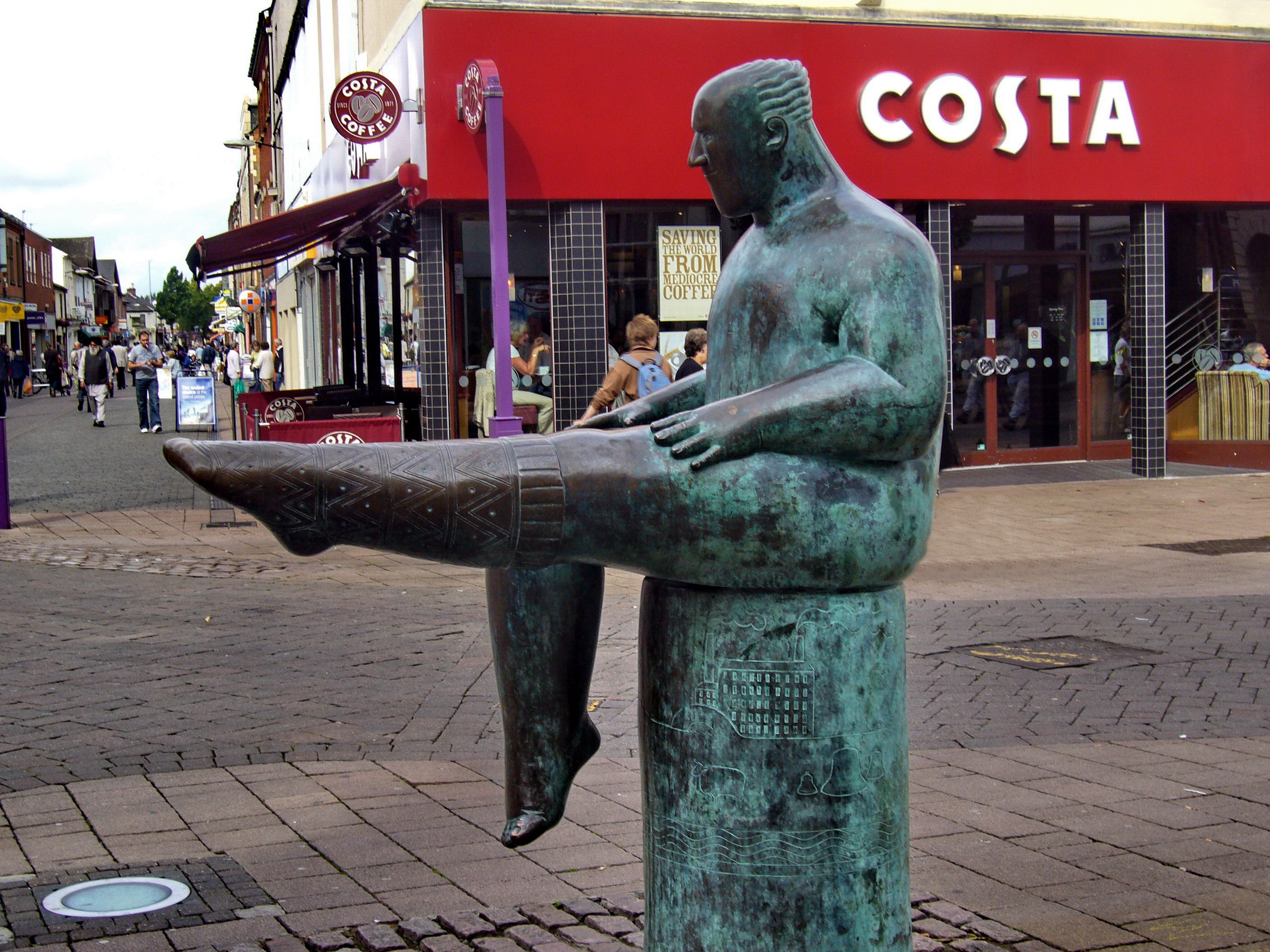
The Sock by Shona Kinloch, Market Square, Loughborough

Kinloch received a Bachelor of Arts with honours in Fine Art (Sculpture) from the Glasgow School of Art in 1984, followed by Post Graduate Study (Sculpture) in 1985. In 1986, the Glasgow School of Art sponsored Kinloch to travel for three months in the Middle East. Her husband Gary Anderson is also an artist who graduated from the Glasgow School of Art in 1984.

== Artwork ==
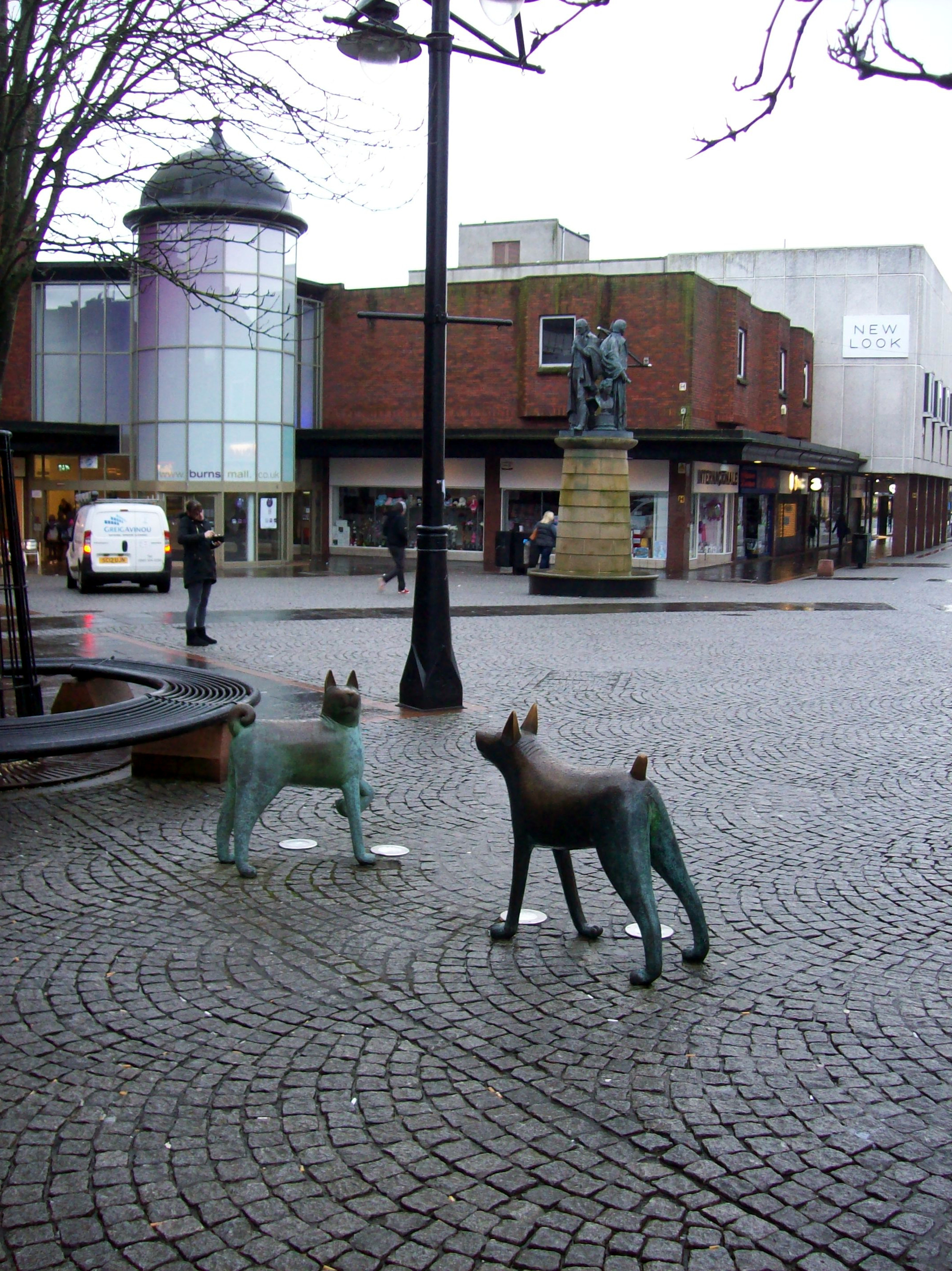
Twa Dogs by Shona Kinloch, Kilmarnock Town Centre

Kinloch is a member of the Royal Society of Sculptors and in 2009 was elected an RGI at the Royal Glasgow Institute of the Fine Arts. She often works in bronze, creating figurative works of people and animals for both public and private commissions. She has exhibited widely, including at Cyril Gerber Fine Art (September–October 1990), Ewan Mundy Fine Art (April 2002), The Scottish Gallery, Edinburgh (June 2002), and The Wade Gallery. She also has public works on five different Royal Caribbean cruise liners.

One of Kinloch's Glasgow Dogs formed part of the bequest made by Dr Helen Cargill Thompson to the University of Strathclyde in 2000.

Kinloch's sculpture The Twa Dogs (1995) based on the Robert Burns poem of the same name stands in Kilmarnock, East Ayrshire town centre near a statue by Alexander Stoddart of Robert Burns and local printer John Wilson who published Burns' first collection: Poems, Chiefly in the Scottish Dialect in 1786. Another one of her sculptures called Kilmarnock Swimmer stands on King Street accompanied by smaller swimmers diving off bins which were created to represent the Kilmarnock Water that flows below the street.

In 2013, Kinloch undertook a commemorative project with artist Margaret Gilbertson to turn the old foundations of Canberra Primary School in East Kilbride into pieces of art to raise money for school funds.

Kinloch has worked with students from Irvine Royal Academy, Clydeview Academy and St Columba's High as part of Art UK's 'Masterpieces in Schools' project.

== Public works ==
- Seven Glasgow Dogs (1988), Glasgow Garden Festival, Glasgow
- Thinking of Bella (1990), Italian Centre, Glasgow
- As the Crow Flies (1990), Garnethill Lighting Project, Glasgow. Note: This sculpture was destroyed in July 2002.
- Chookie Birdies (1993), Garnethill Lighting Project, Glasgow
- Fission (1993), British Energy, East Kilbride
- Four Twins (1994), Foregate Square, Kilmarnock
- Kilmarnock Swimmers (1995), King Street, Kilmarnock
- Twa Dogs (1995), The Cross, Kilmarnock
- Binmen (1995), King Street, Kilmarnock
- Charming (1996), The Village, East Kilbride
- A Leith Walk (1996), Elm Row, Edinburgh
- See Dogs, See Gulls (1996), Irvine
- In Pursuit Of . . . (1996), University of Strathclyde, Glasgow
- Bronzefish Bowl (1997), St Francis Friary, Glasgow
- The Sock (1998), Market Square, Loughborough
- The Square Stars (1998), Hamilton Town Square
- Seagulls (1999), Morecambe
- As Proud as a... (2000), Princes Square, Glasgow
- Fetch (2000), Tattenhall, Cheshire
- Chicken Crossing (2001), Fort Kinnaird, Edinburgh
- The Seagull Has Landed (2002) and Birdies (2002), Brilliance of the Seas II, cruise liner
- Three Craws (2002), Eskbank
- Eagle of Perth III (2002), Perth, Scotland

== Awards ==
- John and Annie Lawrie Bequest (1985)
- Millie and Benno Schotz Award, RGI (1985)
- Civic Trust Award (Italian Centre) (1991)
- Saltire Society Art in Architecture Award (1992)
- Diploma of Excellence (Italian Centre), The Scottish Civic Trust Awards Scheme (1992)
- Civic Trust, Centre Vision Award (Kilmarnock Town Centre) (1997)
- Civic Trust Award Commendation (Leith Walk, Elm Row & London Roundabout) (1998)
- The Association of Landscape Industries Sculpture Award (1999)
