= Preece =

Preece is a surname of Welsh origin. It is an anglicisation of Welsh "ap Rhys" (son of Rhys) and is a variant of the surname Price. Notable people with the surname include:

- Alfred Preece, Mayor of Chatham Islands, New Zealand
- Andy Preece, English footballer and manager
- Annie Preece, American visual artist, public speaker and comedian
- Ben Preece, English cricketer
- Charles Preece, English cricketer
- Chris Preece, Welsh rugby league player
- David Preece (footballer born 1963)
- David Preece (footballer born 1976)
- David Preece (politician), American politician
- Dennis Preece, American sports coach
- George Preece, New Zealand officer
- Harold Preece, American writer
- Helen Preece, British equestrian
- Henry Preece, English cricketer
- Ian Preece, Welsh snooker player
- Isaac Arthur Preece (1907–1964), British biochemist
- Ivor Preece, English rugby union footballer
- Jack Preece (footballer)
- Jack Preece (rugby union)
- Jay Preece, Canadian lacrosse player
- Jenny Preece, Dean of the College of Information Studies at the University of Maryland
- Lillian Preece (1928–2004), British swimmer
- Margaret Preece, English operatic soprano
- Mary Preece, Canadian academic administrator
- Michael Preece, American director, script supervisor, producer, and actor
- Patricia Preece, English artist (born Ruby Preece)
- Peter Preece, English rugby union player
- Rod Preece, English-Canadian philosopher and historian
- Roger Preece, English footballer
- Roger Preece (priest), British Anglican priest
- Ryan Preece, American racing driver
- Steve Preece, American football player
- Tim Preece, English actor
- Trevor Preece, Welsh cricketer
- Warren E. Preece, editor of Encyclopædia Britannica from 1964 to 1975
- William Henry Preece, Welsh electrical engineer and inventor

== See also ==
- Price (surname)
- Pryce
- Rhys#The patronymic form
