= Stanley Mitchell (cricketer) =

Irish first-class cricketer, selector, and sport administrator

Personal information
- Full name: James Stanley Lyons Mitchell
- Born: 19 October 1946; Cullion, Northern Ireland
- Died: 2 October 2025 (aged 78); Blanchardstown, Dublin, Ireland
- Batting: Left-handed

Domestic team information
- Years: Team
- 1974: Ireland

Career statistics
Competition	First-class
Matches	1
Runs scored	29
Batting average	14.50
100s/50s	0/0
Top score	27
Balls bowled	0
Wickets	–
Bowling average	–
5 wickets in innings	–
10 wickets in match	–
Best bowling	–
Catches/stumpings	1/–
- Source: Cricinfo, 2 November 2018

James Stanley Lyons Mitchell (19 October 1946 – 2 October 2025) was an Irish first-class cricketer who later served as president of the Irish Cricket Union.

== Life ==
Mitchell was born at Cullion in County Tyrone in October 1946, and was educated at Foyle College in Derry. He first played club cricket for Donemana, before moving to Belfast to study at Queen's University, where he joined the university cricket club.

Mitchell made his debut for Ireland in a minor match against the Netherlands at Amstelveen on Ireland's 1974 tour of the Netherlands. Later that year, he made a single appearance in first-class cricket for Ireland against Scotland at Alloway. Playing as a middle order batsman, Mitchell batted twice in the match. He was dismissed in Ireland's first-innings for 2 runs by Jack Clark, while in their second-innings he was dismissed by Frank Robertson for 27 runs.

He later moved to Dublin, where he played club cricket for Phoenix. Outside of cricket, Mitchell runs his own business called Dublin Grass Machinery.

After retiring from playing, he became a national selector, and in 2005 he served as president of the Irish Cricket Union, helping to organise the 2005 ICC Trophy, which Ireland hosted.

Mitchell died on 2 October 2025, at the age of 78.
