= Greenock Academy =

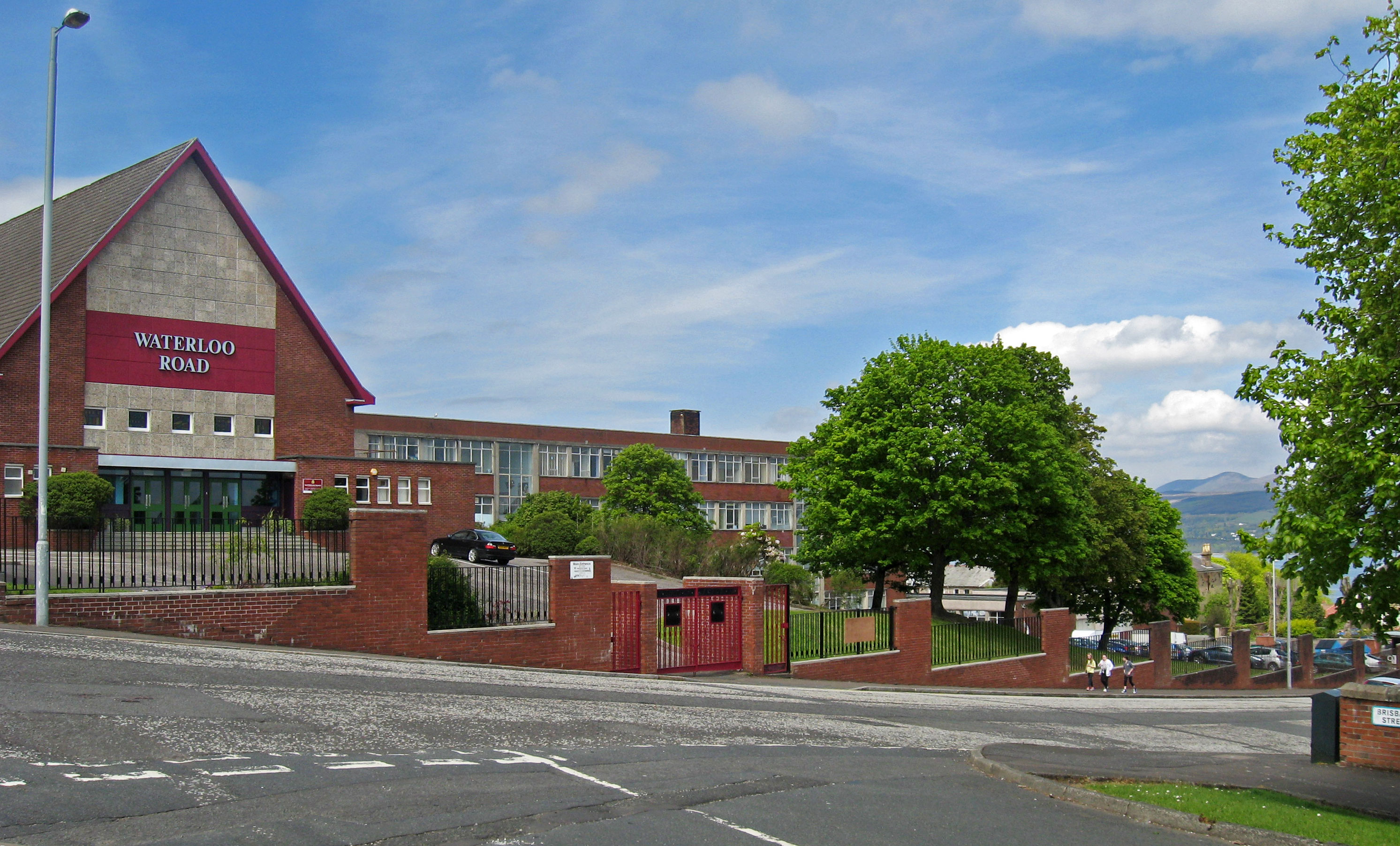
- The Greenock Academy Building as 'Waterloo Road' in 2012

Location
- Madeira Street; Greenock West, Renfrewshire, PA16 7XE; Scotland
- 55.956°N 4.779°W

Information
- Type: Secondary School (1855–2011); Secondary and Primary School (1855–1976)
- Motto: 'Hinc Vera Virtus' ('From This Place Comes True Worth')
- Established: 1855
- Closed: 2011; 2015 (demolished)
- Local authority: Inverclyde
- Headteacher: Moira McColl (2001–2011)
- Gender: Coeducational
- Age: 11 to 18
- Colours: Maroon / white (Greenock Academy Colours); Maroon And Yellow (Waterloo Road)

Greenock Academy was a mixed non-denominational school in the west end of Greenock, Scotland. It was founded in 1855 and was originally independent, later a grammar school with a primary department, and finally a Comprehensive school only for ages eleven to eighteen. On 24 June 2011, Greenock Academy closed after a history spanning 156 years. Between 2012 and 2015, the school became the filming location of BBC One's school drama Waterloo Road.

== History ==
Greenock Academy was opened as a fee-paying secondary and primary establishment in September 1855 in Nelson Street, Greenock. The school lay at this central Greenock location for almost a century of its lifetime before the building was demolished and in June 1964, moved to a modern building in Madeira Street of Greenock's west end, on the site of the old Balclutha mansion. The Finnart Campus of James Watt College now occupies the old school's Nelson Street site. The new Academy featured both a secondary and primary school with the later named 'south wing' area being the primary school. The new school was the first in county to have a swimming pool (just 10yds long and 4ft deep at the deep end!). On 29 December 1968 BBC Scotland's version of Songs of Praise came from the school; the rest of the UK saw it from Holy Trinity Platt Church in Rusholme, Manchester. The school had a yacht club, and competed in the Clark Cup of Mudhook Yacht Club at Helensburgh. Another similar school with a yacht club was Rothesay Academy on the Isle of Bute.

=== Comprehensive ===
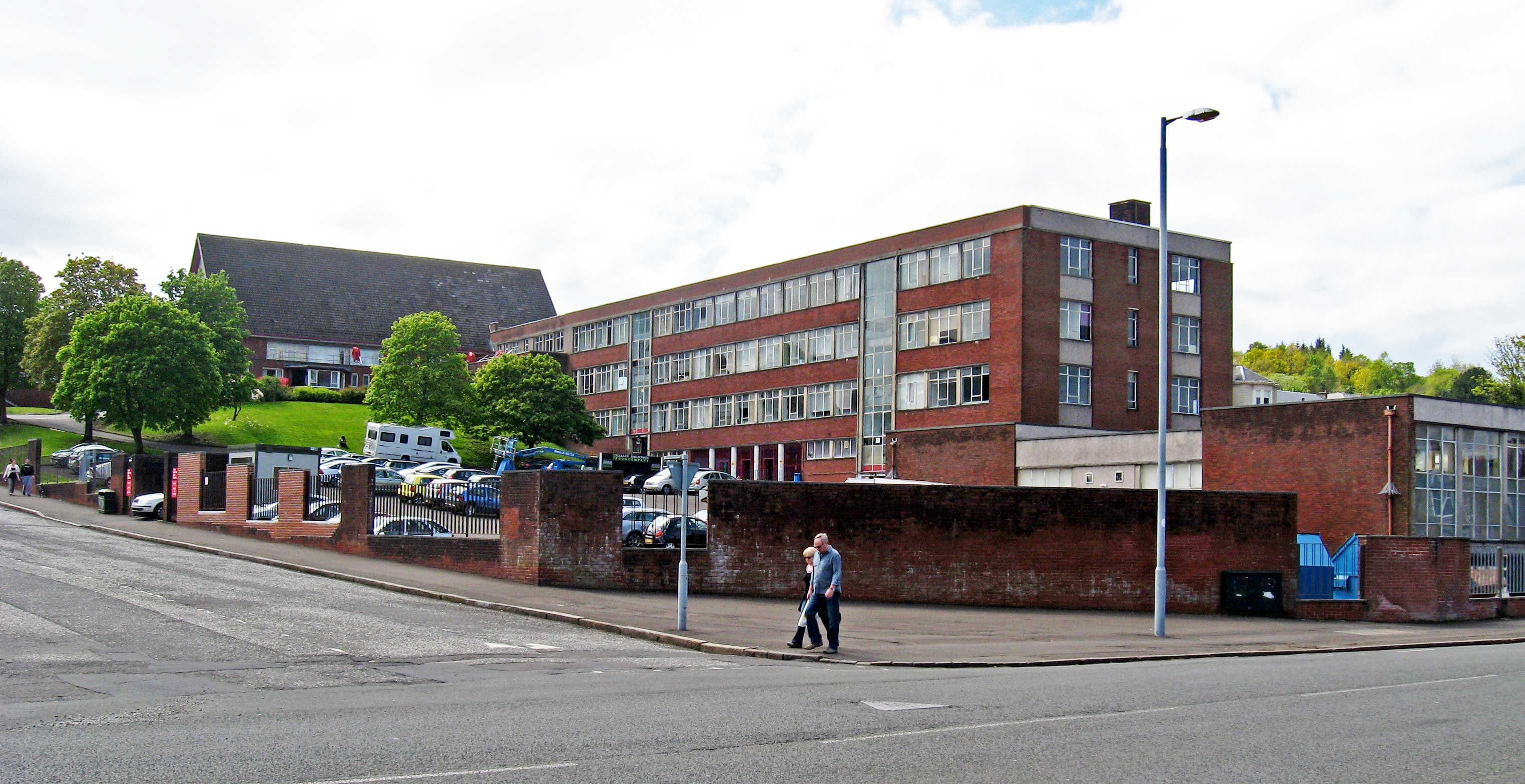
View from Newark Street, looking up Madeira Street to the entrance.

The primary department was abolished in 1976 and the lower door handles and alphabet tiles still remained into the years as a secondary school. The Madeira Street campus remained open through into the new millennium as Greenock Academy clocked up its 150th year in 2005. Three years later, the school was named as the best non-denominational school in Scotland and still remained within the top 10% of Scottish secondary schools long after the announcement. The disrepair of the ageing building overthrew the academic performance of the academy and in 2011 the school prepared to close after 156 years in service. Greenock Academy and Gourock High School merged into a new school in the Bayhill area of Gourock. The new school, on the site previously occupied by St Columba's High School, Gourock, is known as Clydeview Academy and opened in 2011.

=== Waterloo Road ===
On 27 October 2011, the BBC announced that they had selected the Madeira Street building of Greenock Academy to film a new series of the TV drama Waterloo Road, following the production's move up north to nearby Glasgow. The site was leased from Inverclyde Council. On 2 April 2014, it was announced that the 10th series of Waterloo Road was to be the last as the BBC "believe it has reached the end of its lifecycle". Filming concluded on the set in August 2014.

=== Demolition ===
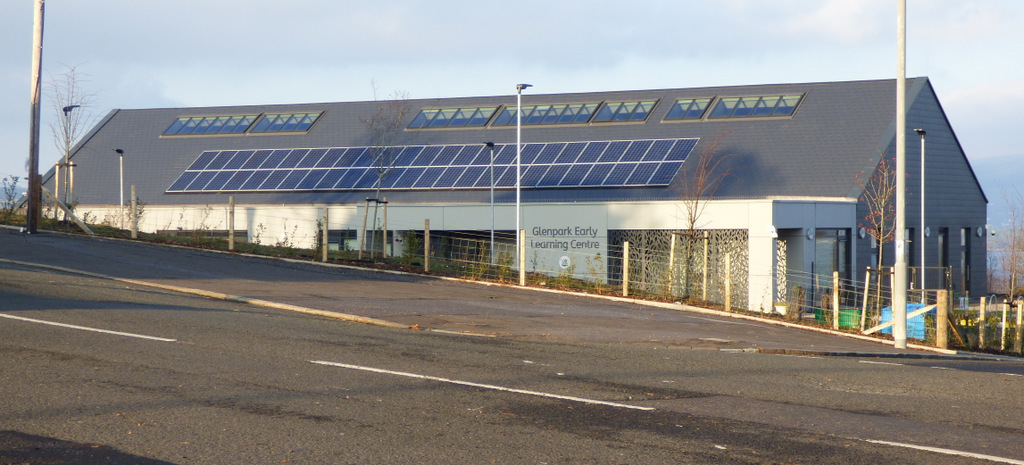
Glenpark Early Learning Centre (2018)

On 4 April 2015, the final stage in the school's history was brought forth as the demolition of the Madeira Street building was announced as being scheduled in September 2015, at an estimated cost of £164,000, following the end of filming used in the then anticipated date of May 2014. However, plans for demolition appeared to be brought forward as work began flattening the former school in February 2015. The council sold the site for redevelopment; the Glenpark Early Learning Centre was constructed at the top of the site and completed in 2018.

== Rectors of the Greenock Academy ==
The principals of Greenock Academy always had the title of 'Rector'. As of 2008, Alan McDougall and Moira McColl are the only two surviving individuals to have held the post. Upon the merger of Greenock Academy and Gourock High School, a new principal was appointed, Mr William Todd and thereafter, Mr Craig Gibson of Clydeview Academy.

Rector	Start of office	End of office	Duration (years)	Comments
Robert Buchanan	1855	1860	5	First rector of Greenock Academy. Resigned from office in 1860.
Archibald Montgomerie	1860	1872	12	Originally a Mathematics Scholar.
Edward L. Neilson	1872	1893	21	First Classics Scholar to take up the post.
Alexander Gemmell	1893	1930	37	Appointed at the age of 28, he was the longest serving Rector of the Academy, serving for 37 years, and was largely responsible for the beginning of formal 'Games' at the Greenock Academy.
William Braid Taylor	1930	1941	11	Previously the principal teacher of English at the academy and rector of Johnstone High School.
William McLachlan Dewar	1941	1947	6	Resigned from the academy in 1947 to become rector of George Heriot's School in Edinburgh.
James W. Chadwin	1947	1967	20	Rector during the transfer of campuses of the academy.
Robert K. Campbell	1967	1990	23	At the forefront of banning corporal punishment in schools, he abolished the belt in the academy two years before it was officially banned at the national level. Campbell died in 2008.
Alan McDougall	1991	1999	9	The last male rector of Greenock Academy, he retired from the post in December 1999. His deputy rector, Patrick Innes, became the acting principal of the Academy until a permanent successor had been decided.
Moira A. McColl	2000	2011	11	The last rector of Greenock Academy and the only female rector in its history, she was still in office when the school closed in June 2011.

== Notable teachers ==
- Colin Campbell, SNP MSP for West of Scotland (taught from 1967–73)
- Daniel Turner Holmes
- William King Gillies
- James Brunton Stephens, poet
- Alexander Graham Bell taught in the school for a year.
- William McLachlan Dewar CBE FRSE, headmaster in the 1940s

== Notable alumni ==
=== Grammar school ===
- Sir Dugald Baird, Regius Professor of Midwifery in the University of Aberdeen
- George Blake, author
- William Carnie, cricketer
- Walter Clarke Buchanan, politician
- Edward Caird, Master of Balliol College, Oxford, from 1893 to 1907
- John Caird, theologian
- Alexander Carmichael, writer
- Jack Clark, cricketer
- Ross Finnie, Liberal Democrat MSP from 1999–2011 for West of Scotland
- Right Rev. Archibald Fleming, first Bishop of The Arctic
- Annabel Goldie, Conservative MSP for West Scotland 1999–2016, Leader of the Scottish Conservative Party 2005–2011
- Robert Hodge, cricketer and badminton player
- Colin Lamont, actor, writer, teacher, radio presenter and broadcaster. Best known for being Scottie McClue.
- Allan Macartney, Scottish National Party MEP from 1994 to 1998 for North East Scotland
- Very Rev. John McIndoe, Moderator of the General Assembly of the Church of Scotland for 1996–1997
- Air Marshal Sir Harold Whittingham, pathologist, Director-General of RAF Medical Services and Director of Medical Services of BOAC
- Richard Wilson (born 1936), actor
- David Wright Young, Labour MP for Bolton South East and later for Bolton East

=== Comprehensive school ===
- Malcolm Offord, financier and politician
