= St James Power Station =

Coordinates: 1.2647°N 103.8247°E

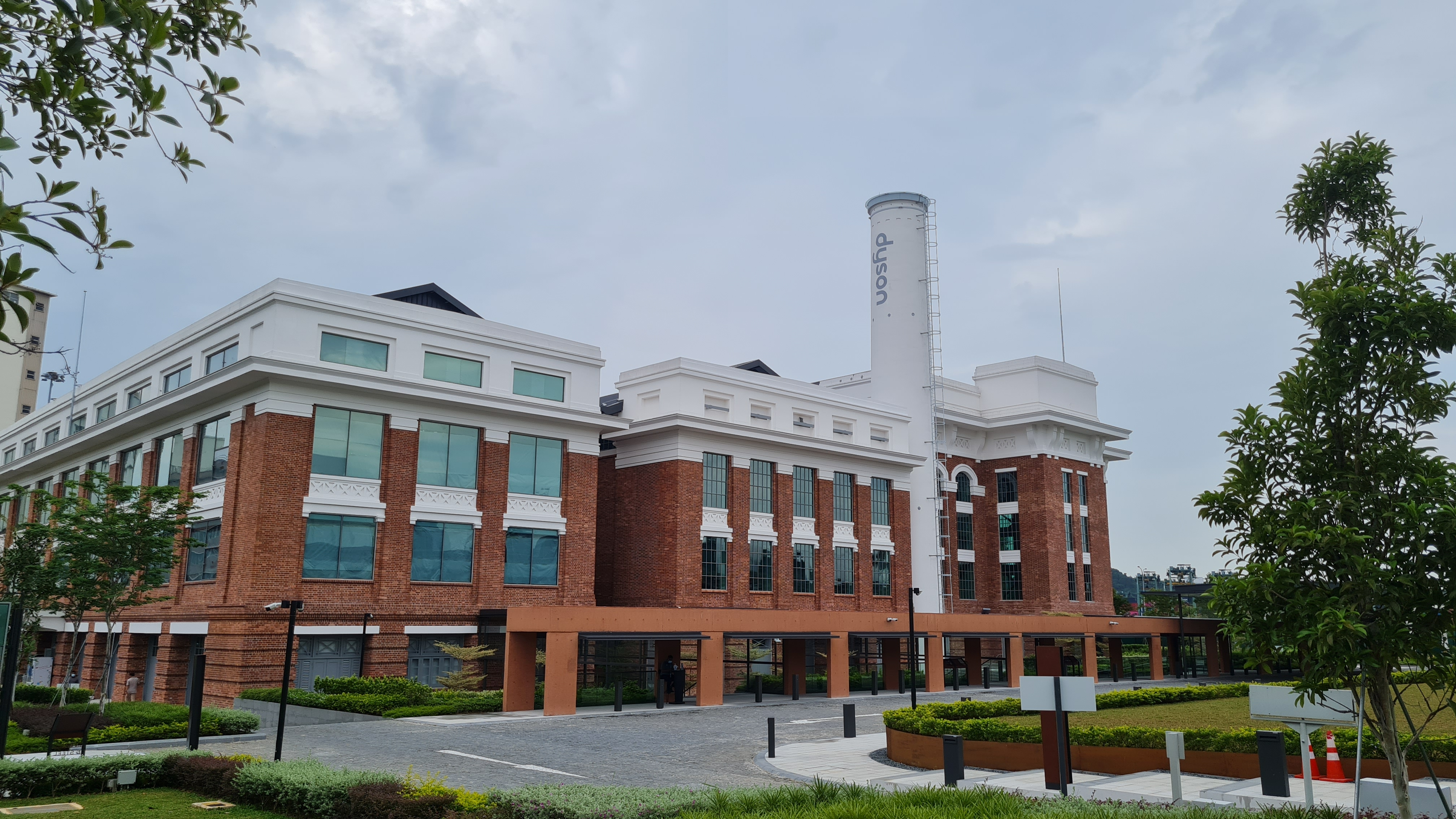
- Entrance to St James Power Station

General information
- Location: 3 Sentosa Gateway, Singapore 098544
- Current tenants: Dyson
- Completed: 3 June 1926; 100 years ago
- Renovated: 4 March 2022; 4 years ago
- Owner: Government of Singapore

Design and construction
- Architects: Alexander Gordon and Preece; Cardew & Rider

Other information
- Public transit: NE1 HarbourFront

St James Power Station is a building located in HarbourFront, Singapore. Built in 1926, it was Singapore's first power station, which supplied electricity to the nearby port and the surrounding industries, shipyards, and residences. It was previously also the one and only coal-fired power plant in the country.

After it was decommissioned in the 1970s, it became a warehouse and subsequently a major music-themed nightlife venue until 2018. In 2009, St James Power Station was designated as one of the country's national monuments by the National Heritage Board.

It is currently used as the headquarters for the technological company Dyson as well as being the site of a heritage trail and gallery tour dedicated to Singapore's port and industrial history.

== History ==
St James Power Station
- Interactive map of St James Power Station

Site notes
- Architectural style: Edwardian
- Governing body: National Heritage Board

National monument of Singapore
- Designated: 11 November 2009; 16 years ago
- Reference no.: 60

=== Cape St James ===
The site on which the power station sits was a small headland that was a tidal swamp with a small inhabitation of Orang Laut that lived on stilt-houses and fished for a living.

=== Electricity demand ===
Electricity was first generated in Singapore for local public infrastructures, such as the Port of Singapore, operated by the Singapore Harbour Board (SHB) in 1897, and subsequently the electric trams and street-lighting by the Singapore Tramway Company (STC) in 1902.

Later, it was considered that the electricity generated, which was mainly channelled to power the trams, could also be used to supply local small-towns and districts like Tanglin, at around a period of time when there was a generally-steady increase in demand for electricity over the years.

Electricity was rapidly becoming a necessity rather than a luxury as businesses and households needed to power their electrical appliances, gear and equipment. The few and small power plants run by the STC proved to be inadequate to fulfill such a growing need and the British colonial administration of Singapore desperately needed a power plant that would be able to meet growing industrial and domestic needs and allow for Singapore's continued development and future growth.

=== Power station ===
In 1924, Cape St James was chosen by A. H. Preece, the chief consulting engineer in-charge, as the location for the new power station as it had, firstly, a proximity to the sea for free and unlimited access to seawater for the power plant's water circulation and cooling systems; secondly, a proximity to sea-borne coal delivered by ships and/or barges; thirdly, a proximity to the Federated Malay States Railway (FMSR) train station at Tanjong Pagar for rail-borne coal and building materials required for the construction of the power station; lastly, a large area of five acres.

In order to meet the urgent demands for electrical power, a 2,000 kW power generator was rushed to be completed. However, since more than half of the construction site was swampy and the natural conditions were tidal, a considerable amount of preliminary work to reclaim 12,000 square-yards was to be carried out before the actual work of laying the concrete foundations and erecting the power station's huge steel-frame skeleton could begin. The sole power generator was finally completed in June 1926 but it would only run during peak-demand loads from 6 pm to 11 pm each day.

On 7 November in 1927, St James Power Station was officially opened by then governor Hugh Clifford. At its full output-capacity, the power plant produced approximately 22,000 kW of electricity, much of which was supplied to the Pasir Panjang, Bukit Timah, Tanglin, Geylang, Katong and East Coast areas and districts. It reached out to around 28,255 people, which was at least 18 times more people on the island than before. Locals could hire electric fans and other domestic electrical appliances in a scheme from an electricity showroom located at Orchard Road. Equipped with the most advanced and modern construction and machinery, it was deemed to be capable of supplying the power needs of Singapore for a good many years to come.

Historian Singh Mohinder recollects that, during this period, St James Power Station became a major landmark of its surroundings and had the effect of entirely transforming the appearance of that part of the Telok Blangah Bay area.

=== Decommissioning ===
Throughout its service-life, the power plant suffered from many temporary shutdowns and frequent power failures and stoppages. This led to the most extensive power cut in 1948 which lasted for eight and a half hours, affecting all the non-city areas of Singapore from 8 am to 4:30 pm and a widespread blackout in 1950 when electricity to the entire island was cut off for one and a half hours.

Many thousand dollars' worth of ice-cream in private houses, residences and restaurants melted and hawker-stands had to rely on oil-lamps and candles. In restaurants throughout the city, most people ignored the power failure and went on dining and/or dancing by candlelight, with many men stripping off coats and bowties because of the heat from cut and downed air-conditioning (AC) and fans. In the Victoria Memorial Hall, the Singapore Repertory Company was performing when the power outage occurred, which led to a car being driven into the entrance of the hall with its headlights reflecting on-to a large mirror directed to the stage in front.

Over the years, the locals were told and reminded repeatedly to cut down on and reduce electricity consumption so as to lighten the heavy load on the power-generators by the power plant's chief electrical engineer, but yet the demand for electricity continued to rise. Once again, Singapore had a problem of electricity shortage and was forced to introduce rationing of electricity during peak-hours in June 1926.

In an effort to increase general efficiency, the plant underwent a fair degree of renovations and improvement works, to be equipped with new machinery and power-generators to increase the overall electrical power output with a brand-new gas turbine and new tall chimneys. However, these efforts were futile as St. James Power Station remained expensive to operate at 3.57 cents for per unit of electrical power produced against 1.4 cents of the same amount yielded at the nearby (also, then-new) Pasir Panjang Power Station, first constructed during the 1950s. The power station was finally decommissioned in 1976 due to its high overall operating costs and the island's continually-growing demand for electricity and was shut down after consuming its last reserves of gas fuel. The old power plant's machinery were removed and the entire building was left vacant.

=== Warehouse ===
During the 1980s, the sheer volume of shipping container traffic at the nearby port at Brani stretched the capacity of its staff and resources and placed enormous pressure of running a global-looking port. As a result, the Port of Singapore Authority (PSA) decided to go high-tech using automated and computerised machinery for its port operations and converted the former power plant into a high-bay semi-automated warehouse. It kept most of the original architectural elements from the British colonial era but a few light-fittings and windows were broken in the process of refurbishing the old power station for its new use.

=== Entertainment hub ===
In the 1991 Concept Plan, the area was zoned from an industrial and harbour area to a commercial area, which led to massive redevelopment in the surrounding region after much operations at Keppel Harbour moved westwards to Pasir Panjang and Jurong. HarbourFront Centre was relaunched and VivoCity and HarbourFront Office Park was built.

Dennis Foo, the so-called "King of Nightlife" of Singapore, pioneered the venture to restore the power station into its first multi-concept entertainment hub and nightclub at a total cost of S$43 million, of which half was for conservation works to restore the power station's unique 1920s-era architecture while the other half was spent on its interior and modern club furnishings. Inside, the old turbine-rooms and engine-halls were converted into spaces for clubs and pubs. Most of the original monument, in terms of authentic facade and structures, have been preserved, including the former flagpole and the steps leading to it.

The area is said to have great Feng Shui with its back to a mountain (Mount Faber, lying to the north) and its front to the water (the sea, lying to the south). A tenant at the premises stated that they was drawn to the venue's big space and the fact that the club can run till 6 am, which cannot be found elsewhere in town. Another tenant found St James Power Station over shopping centres and hotels because of its 20m-high ceiling, which provides enough space for light projection. He said, "We need space to project lights, and give partygoers a sense of spaciousness."

St James Power Station regained its grandiosity and entertained the public, with more than 2,500 people partying at its official opening and brought in a revenue of about $30 million in 2013.

Prior to 2018, St James Power Station had 11 nightclubs and live-entertainment destinations housed under one roof, rivalling Zirca at Clarke Quay and nearby Zouk, with 70,000 sq ft (6,500 m^{2}) of floor space.

=== Current usage ===
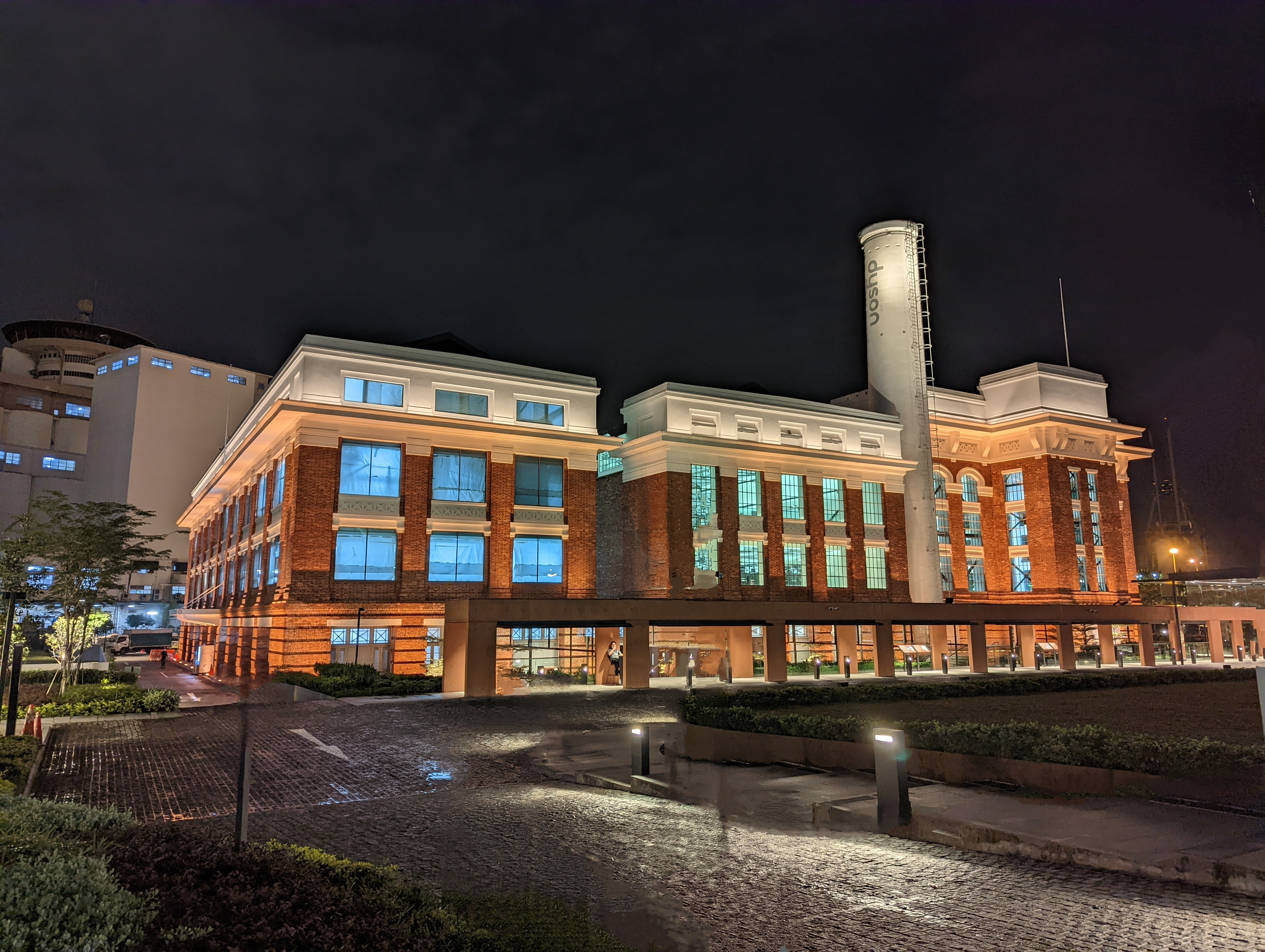
St James Power Station at night

St James Power Station underwent a makeover from 2019 to 2021, having been established as the headquarters of Dyson and being a heritage trail and gallery tour dedicated to Singapore's port and industrial history.

In collaboration with local company Mapletree Investments, its restoration was aimed to revitalise the monument as part of the upcoming Greater Southern Waterfront development. Spanning 110,000 sq ft, it will feature 3 levels of large and modern office spaces, a heritage gallery as well as a research centre and technology lab to improve and test different vacuum technologies for future products. This includes power electronics, energy storage, sensors, vision systems, embedded software, robotics, artificial intelligence, machine learning, and connected devices.

With the new office, it aims to double its talent pool of engineers and scientists as they once mentioned that they will be hiring at least 250 more engineers and scientists in Singapore over the next five years as part of its S$5.1 billion global investment in future technology. Ever since the company moved to Singapore, the future headquarters will "reflect the increasing importance of Asia" to its business. Restoration works completed on 4 March 2022.

== Architecture ==
The power station's building was designed by Alexander Esmé Gordon and Preece, together with Cardew & Rider, being based on Edwardian architecture, which was quite popular during the reign of King Edward VII of the United Kingdom and was notable for being less ornate, being composed of big spaces and the offer of much natural lighting and the use of lighter shades of colours because there was less concern about soot and thick dust with the introduction of electricity (instead of relying on fire from candles and oil-lamps, amongst others, for lighting). It was regarded that Edwardian architecture was generally perfect for public buildings and the same architectural style was also applied for the Central Fire Station, located in Singapore's town-centre, in 1909.

The building comprised a boiler-hall, a turbine room, a switchgear house, numerous pumps, and several storage-areas for coal, with its boiler-hall, the turbine room and the switchgear house laying parallel with the sea and the shoreline. The most distinctive features of St James Power Station was its large red-brick walls, its long rows of full-length windows (made up of stained glass) and its two chimneys.

Victor Koh Dut Sye, a local shopkeeper running a business near the power station, noted its red-brick structure, particularly during the time the power station was first commissioned, when red brick was associated with prestige. The architectural use of red-brick outer-cladding was typically reserved for major buildings.

The building is one of the few historical industrial buildings in Singapore with triple-level arch-shaped windows, which enabled much natural light to penetrate in and provide generous lighting in the interior of the power station. It also has voluminous space in the inside which was initially designed to house the large electricity generators and power equipment. After the power station was closed down and decommissioned in the 1970s, these heavy machinery were cleared away and removed.
