= Stan Mitchell =

Stan or Stanley Mitchell may refer to:

- Stan Mitchell (Australian footballer) (born 1952), Australian rules footballer
- Stan Mitchell (American football) (1944–2012), American football fullback
- Stanley Mitchell (1932–2011), British translator, academic, and author
- Stanley Mitchell (cricketer) (1946–2025), Irish cricketer
- Stanley Robert Mitchell (1881–1963), Australian metallurgist, amateur mineralogist and ethnologist
- Stanley "Stan" Mitchell, a fictional protagonist of the song "Stan"
