= William McLachlan Dewar =

William McLachlan Dewar CBE FRSE FRSA
- Born: 19 April 1905; Crieff, Scotland
- Died: 16 September 1979; Edinburgh, Scotland
- Education: University of Edinburgh
- Occupations: Educator, Headmaster
- Spouse: Mary Sinclair Anderson (m. 1935)
- Children: 3

William McLachlan Dewar (1905–1979) was a Scottish educator who served as Headmaster of George Heriot's School in Edinburgh from 1947 to 1970. Tam Dalyell, who did teaching practice at Heriot's, described him as a "remarkable" and "fierce headmaster" in his autobiography.

== Early life and education ==
William Dewar was born on 19 April 1905 in Crieff in Perthshire the son of James McLachlan Dewar and Annie Kempie Cuthbert. He was educated locally at Morrison's Academy and then studied classics at the University of Edinburgh, including a period of study in Rome, graduating MA with distinction in 1928.

== Career ==
Dewar taught at Aberdeen Grammar School from 1929 to 1932, was principal teacher of Classics at Dumfries Academy from 1933 until 1941, and then became Rector of Greenock Academy. In 1947 he was appointed to the prestigious role of Headmaster at George Heriot's.

Dewar's appointment at Heriot's was a break with the tradition of appointing insiders. He started out as a reformer, which approach was most obvious in the changes he initiated in the running of sport, in particular rugby. The appointment of what was held to be Scotland's first Games teacher led to some resistance among traditionalists at the School.

Dewar and the Heriot Trust tried throughout his time as Headmaster to solve the School's accommodation problems. These efforts were complicated by limited financial resources, which Dewar tried to solve by involving the former pupil community as part of a “Development Scheme” in the early 1960s. Plans to expand on the School's Lauriston Place site were blocked in the mid-1960s, by, among others, the Royal Fine Arts Commission, which was worried about the effects of new construction on the setting of the School's 17th century main building.

The tercentenary celebrations of the opening of Heriot's marked the peak of Dewar's period as Headmaster. Part of the programme in May and June 1959 was a visit by a group of former pupils from Serbia who had attended the School as refugees during World War I. Dewar took a personal interest in this Serbian connection, making visits to then Yugoslavia, including one with his family in the summer of 1962.

Dewar was a very active and influential member of committees and bodies connected with Scottish education. He was Chairman of the Governors of Moray House College of Education from 1958 to 1971. Among other prominent engagements included being President of the Scottish Schoolmasters’ Association in 1944, of the Scottish Secondary Teachers’ Association from 1947 to 1949 and of the Headmasters’ Association of Scotland from 1958 to 1960. Additionally, he was a member of the Committee on Grants to Students from 1958 to 1960, of the Scottish Council for the Training of Teachers from 1959 to 1967, and of the Scottish Certificate of Education Examination Board from 1964 to 1973. Dewar put his network among Scottish teachers to use in the SCEEB's setting up of the Ordinary Grade examinations and served as convenor of its examination committee.

== Other activities, honours and recognition ==
During the Second World War Dewar trained Scottish Air Cadets as part of the Royal Air Force Volunteer Reserve. He received an OBE for his work as a member of the Scottish Air Cadet Council in 1955.

In 1955 he published a pamphlet, The law and the teacher, for the Scottish Secondary Teachers’ Association.

Outside education Dewar was a director of the Edinburgh Chamber of Commerce from 1964 to 1967. After his retirement he was Chairman of the City of Edinburgh Valuation Appeal Committee in 1974/75, Deputy Chairman of the Lothian Valuation Appeal Panel from 1975 to 1977, and a director of Craigmyle (Scotland) Ltd from 1971.

In 1958, he was elected a Fellow of the Royal Society of Edinburgh. Dewar's proposers were Hugh Bryan Nisbet, Isaac Arthur Preece, Maurice George Say and Walter George Green. Dewar was appointed a Chevalier of the Ordre des Palmes Académiques in 1961 in recognition of his work on school exchange with France. In 1968 Dewar was elected a Fellow of the Royal Society of Arts. In 1970, he received a CBE on his retirement, for services to Scottish education. Dewar received an honorary DLitt from Heriot-Watt University in 1970.

== Personal life ==
Dewar married Mary Sinclair Anderson, originally from Laxfirth in Shetland, in July 1935. Together they had a daughter and two sons. He died on 16 September 1979.

== Assessment ==
Towards the end of his career Dewar was perceived as ‘old school’, resistant to changing social norms among pupils in the 1960s, such as hair length. His appearance in class photographs at this time in full academic dress, his nickname “the Dome”, and the stories of his disciplinary methods all reinforced this image. In fact, Dewar was a central figure in Scottish education at a local, national and international level, a skilled committee man, with unmistakable presence and a sense of humour. Among his hobbies he listed the study of puns. The reforming outsider of the late 1940s became an authoritative source on the history of George Heriot's. His interventions in the struggle over grant-aided education in the later 1970s in Scotland, most notably in letters to The Scotsman, are examples of his mixture of substance, direct style and commitment.
