= William King Gillies =

Scottish educator

Dr William King Gillies FRSE FEIS LLD (1875–1952) was a Scottish educator and academic author. He was rector of Hutchesons Grammar School in 1913–1919 and the Royal High School, Edinburgh in 1919–1940.

== Life ==
He was born on 20 March 1875. He was educated at Spier's School in Beith, North Ayrshire.

He graduated MA from Glasgow University in 1895. He was a Snell Exhibitioner in 1895 and Logan Medallist in 1897. He then went to Balliol College, Oxford. He taught successively at Greenock Academy, Campbeltown Grammar School, Perth Academy and Glasgow High School in 1904. He was elected a Fellow of the Educational Institute of Scotland in 1917. When he left Hutchesons' Grammar School in November 1919 he was presented with a volume of Richard Jebb's Essays and Addresses, signed by 33 members of the staff, as well as an etching and a silver salver.

In 1925 he was elected a Fellow of the Royal Society of Edinburgh. His proposers were James Watt, David Brown Dott, Ralph Allan Sampson and John Mathieson. He resigned in 1939.

In 1932 Glasgow University awarded him an honorary doctorate (LLD). A prominent mason he was Permanent Secretary of the Grand Lodge of Scotland from 1941.

He retired in March 1940, remaining in Edinburgh.

He died on Saturday 15 November 1952 at Edinburgh Royal Infirmary having been struck by a tram on 1 October.

His daughter, Dorothy King Gillies, was headmistress of Grantham High School for Girls.

== Publications ==
- A Latin Reader (1908 reprinted 1939)
- Latin of the Empire (1909 reprinted 1926)
