= The Sockman =

Bronze statue in Loughborough, England

- The Sock
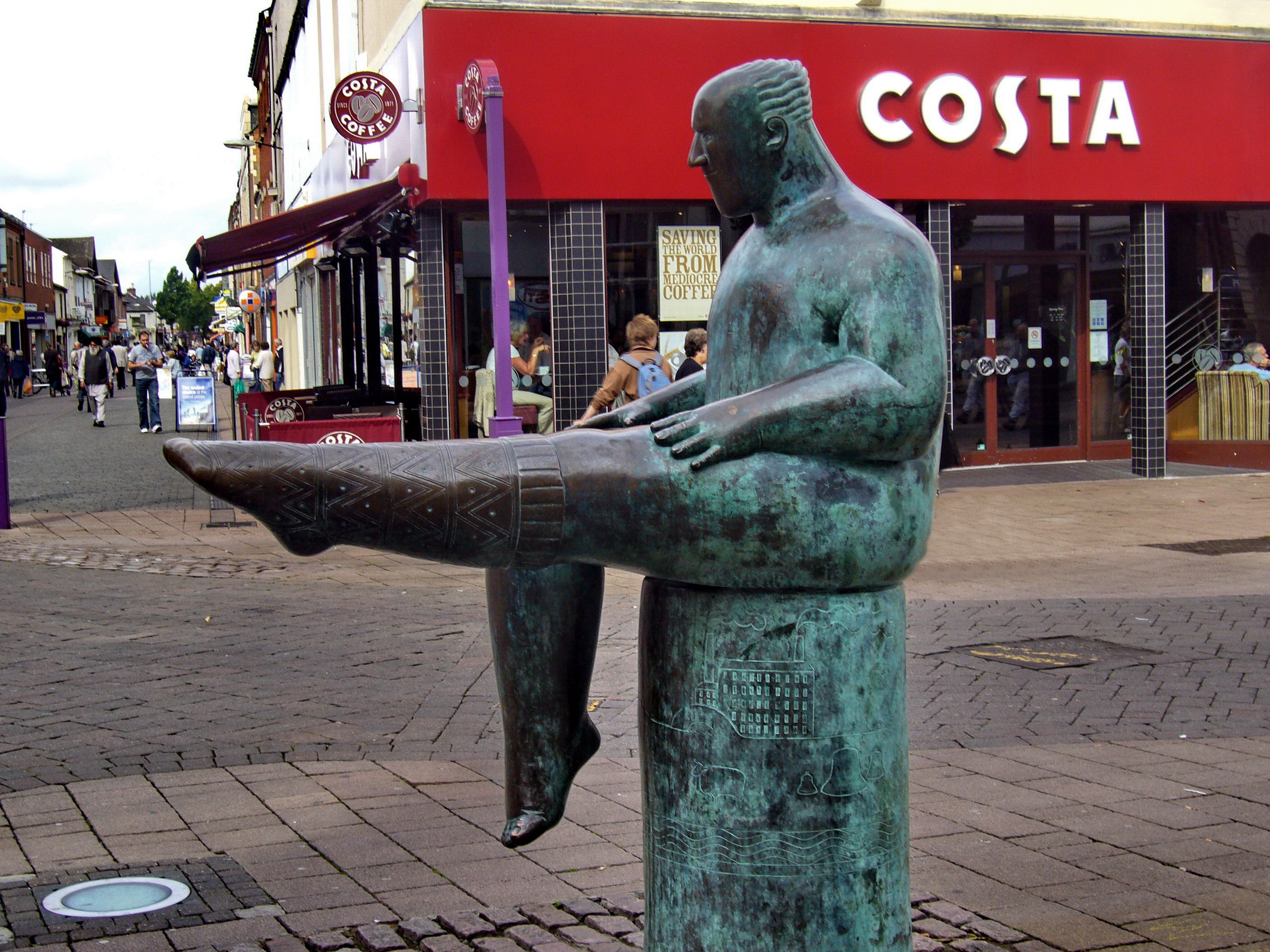
- The Sockman in Loughborough Market Place.
- Artist: Shona Kinloch
- Year: 1998
- Medium: Bronze sculpture
- Dimensions: 185 cm × 130 cm × 60 cm (6 ft × 4 ft × 2 ft)
- Location: Loughborough, United Kingdom
- 52.771069°N 1.206769°W

The Sockman (commissioned as The Sock) is a bronze statue in Loughborough town centre.

The sculpture depicts a man seated on a bollard, naked except for the eponymous sock on his left foot. The sock is symbolic of Loughborough's hosiery industry, and the plinth is engraved with images of the town's history.

The piece has become iconic, and is used as a symbol for Loughborough.

== History ==
In 1997, Charnwood Borough Council decided to have a sculpture to provide "an attractive feature and focus of public interest" in the newly-pedestrianised Loughborough Market Place. They chose a central site just in front of Loughborough Town Hall.

A competition was held in which five artists were selected to design a statue. A panel of local experts and laypeople were gathered to make the decision; the winning design was by Scottish sculptor, Shona Kinloch. Her piece was favoured for artistic quality, technical merit, and durability (being both weather and vandal resistant).

My idea for the Loughborough Market Place is a man, rather on the stocky side, who sits admiring his zigzag sock. The design on the sock is inspired by the fact of the woollen industry, hosiery and knitwear being the speciality, contributing greatly to Loughborough's prosperity.

He will sit on a bollard, which has been incised with images, in low reflect, from Loughborough's history.

— Shona Kinloch

The council commissioned The Sock in April 1998 at a cost of £23,000.
