= William Carnie =

Scottish cricketer

Personal information
- Full name: William Dugald Carnie
- Born: 29 June 1906; Greenock, Renfrewshire, Scotland
- Died: 14 August 1980 (aged 74); Saint-Lambert, Quebec, Canada
- Batting: Right-handed
- Bowling: Right-arm fast-medium

Domestic team information
- Years: Team
- 1925: Scotland

Career statistics
Competition	First-class
Matches	1
Runs scored	6
Batting average	6.00
100s/50s	–/–
Top score	6*
Balls bowled	54
Wickets	0
Bowling average	–
5 wickets in innings	–
10 wickets in match	–
Best bowling	–
Catches/stumpings	1/–
- Source: Cricinfo, 20 October 2022

William Dugald Carnie (29 June 1906 — 14 August 1980) was a Scottish first-class cricketer.

Carnie was born at Greenock in June 1906, where he was educated at Greenock Academy. A club cricketer for Greenock, he made a single appearance in first-class cricket for Scotland against Lancashire at Old Trafford in 1925. Batting twice in the match, he was dismissed in the Scotland first innings for 0 by Dick Tyldesley, while in their second innings he scored an unbeaten 6 runs. He also bowled nine wicketless overs with his right-arm fast-medium bowling in Lancashire's only innings of the match, which they won by an innings and 74 runs. He later emigrated to Canada, where he played club cricket for both Toronto and Montreal. Carnie died in August 1980 at Saint-Lambert, Quebec.
