= Vivas Schola Regia =

Song

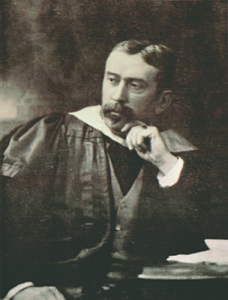
John Marshall, MA, LLD.

Vivas Schola Regia, officially Scholae Regiae Edinensis Carmen, is the song of the Royal High School, Edinburgh. The Latin lyrics were written by the Rector, Dr. John Marshall, in 1895, and set to music by Sir Alexander Mackenzie, a former pupil of the school. James Trotter comments on Marshall's character and influence: 'The spirit which inspired him is well exhibited in his "Song of the High School."'

The first two verses are sung with the refrain at the end of the annual school session, on the Commemoration and Prize Giving Day each July. The third line, 'sicut arx in colle sita' ('like a citadel placed on a hill': this is the literal meaning, not the one that Marshall used in his English translation) refers both to the situation of the school building on the slopes of Calton Hill and to the school crest, which shows a turreted castle on a rock.

The school song, along with the centenary hymn, Nisi Dominus Frustra (words by J.C. Stewart, music by Charles H. F. O'Brien), is one of two well-known musical compositions the school has produced. It has been learnt by generations of Royal High Scholars, and the cultural historian John Bruce Barclay relates a well-known anecdote that testifies to its general currency: 'During the darkest period of the Second World War a watch on board a ship in a middle-east harbour was pacing the deck when he suddenly heard in the darkness the watch on another ship whistling a tune. It was familiar. It was the School song. The solo became a duet but neither man saw the other.'

SCHOLAE REGIAE EDINENSIS CARMEN

Vivas, Schola Edinensis,
Schola Regia venerabilis!
Sicut arx in colle sita,
Sicut sol e nubibus densis,
Splendes, splendeas in aeternum,
Alma Mater atque amabilis:

Refrain
Vivas Schola Regia,
Vivas Schola Regia,
Vivas, vivas, Schola Regia!
Schola Regia!

Quo in aevo tu vetusto
Inter parva infans parvula
Faustis tamen omnium votis
Domicilio in angusto
Cursum tuum ad honores
Iniisti vaga, tremula -

Refrain

Tumgavisa est Doctrina
Gaudent Leges, gaudent Artes;
Matar enim tu bonorum
Surgis altera Erycina
Inter gratias atque Amoris
Splendidas actura partes.

Refrain

Vivas, atque in annoscrescas,
Alma Mater, Schola amata!
Omnium particeps honorum
Surgas semper, neu compescas
Studium tuum gloriae sacrum;
Fausta sis, felix, beata!

Refrain

Liberi tui te laudamus
Laeto omnium cum clamore,
Et quum multis posthac annis
Tui quam juvenes amabamus,
Senes rursus meminerimus,
Vi clamabimus haud minore.

Refrain

Hac ex vita nos cesserimus,
Nomen nostrum mox peribit;
Sed in saecula mortis expers
Tu manebis et veterrimus
Honos tuus revirescens
Juniores anteibit.

Refrain

Marshall also composed an English version:

SONG OF THE ROYAL HIGH SCHOOL

Royal High School, hail to thee!
Worth our worship, worth our praising!
Like a tower set gloriously, –
Like a sun ‘mid clouds outblazing, –
Shin’st thou forth, whose song we’re raising.
Shine thou, shine eternally!
Vivas Schola Regia!

When in ages long departed,
Small thy birthplace, small beginning,
Yet ’midst omens loyal-hearted
Into life thine entrance winning,
Kind the Fates thy fortune spinning,
Honour’s race thou boldly started, –
Vivas Schola Regia!

Learning then thine advent prizing,
Hailed thee gladly. Art and Science
Joyed to watch thy fair uprising
Venus-like, in storms’ defiance,
While the Muses bowed compliance,
Such thy beauty's charm enticing.
Vivas Schola Regia!

Live thou on, with years increasing,
Mother kind, our heart's best treasure!
Let ambition, still unceasing,
Lead where Duty weds with Pleasure,
Glory seeking, yet in measure,
Nought of base they thirst appeasing.
Vivas Schola Regia!

We thy children sound thy glory
With out [sic?] hearts’ united noising,
And when years have told their story,
And are youthful souls’ rejoicing
Changes to an older voicing,
Still we'll chant, though heads be hoary,
Vivas Schola Regia!

Soon must come the day of dying;
Soon our name and frame must perish.
Yet shalt you, Death's power defying,
Still have hearts thy fame to cherish,
Still shalt grow and still shalt flourish,
Younger wrestlers’ strength outvying!
Vivas Schola Regia!
