= Gourock High School =

Location
- Gourock, PA19 1TP; Scotland; 55°57′15″N 4°49′16″W

Information
- Type: Day school
- Motto: Honor Diligentiae Praemium
- Established: 1909
- Closed: 2011
- Local authority: Inverclyde
- Head teacher: Willie Todd
- Gender: Co-educational
- Age: 11 to 18
- Enrolment: 630
- Colours: Blue, grey and burgundy
- Website: http://gourockhigh.inverclyde.sch.uk/

Gourock High School was a non-denominational comprehensive school catering for boys and girls, 11–18 years of age, in Gourock, Renfrewshire, Scotland. The school taught around 630 pupils. The school motto was Honor Diligentiae Praemium, which means "The reward for hard work is renown". Willie Todd had been headteacher since February 2008.

The school was ranked 22nd in a listing of the top 50 secondary schools in Scotland in 2005.

== History ==
The original school was founded in 1909, and comprised separate primary school and larger secondary school buildings, both located on Binnie Street, Gourock. Robert Fulton, who had previously been head master of the Eastern School, was brought in to be the head master of the newly formed Gourock High School.

In 1963, the secondary school moved to Tower Hill where it provided first to fourth years (junior) secondary education under the care of Head Master William Russell. The (previously secondary school) building thus evacuated in Binnie Street was renamed and became the Gourock Primary School which continued to feed pupils completing primary into the new Gourock High. Pupils wishing to continue to fifth and sixth years of (senior) secondary progressed into the Greenock High School, initially in Dunlop Street Greenock, later relocated to a new building in Kip Valley.

Gourock High School closed in 2011, when it and Greenock Academy merged in a new school in the Bayhill area of Gourock. The new school, on the site previously occupied by St Columba's High School, Gourock, is known as Clydeview Academy.
