= Royal High School, Edinburgh =

Coordinates: 55°57′49″N 3°17′7″W

The Royal High School
- Schola Regia Edinensis
- Arms of the Royal High School

Location
- East Barnton Avenue; Edinburgh, EH4 6JP; Scotland

Information
- Type: State school
- Motto: Musis Respublica Floret (The State Flourishes with the Muses)
- Religious affiliation: Non-denominational Christian
- Established: 1128; 898 years ago
- Founder: Alwin, Abbot of Holyrood
- Local authority: Edinburgh City
- Rector: Pauline Walker (2014-Present)
- Staff: around 120 (2023)
- Gender: Mixed (all-boys previously)
- Age: 11 to 18
- Enrollment: around 1,400 (2023)
- Houses: Angles; Britons; Picts; Scots; Gaels; Celts
- Colours: Black, white & purple
- Publication: Schola Regia
- Song: Vivas Schola Regia
- Latin name: Schola Regia Edinensis
- Nickname: The Tounis Scule, RHS
- Website: https://royalhigh.wordpress.com/

The Royal High School (RHS) of Edinburgh is a co-educational school administered by the City of Edinburgh Council. The school was founded in 1128 and is one of the oldest schools in Scotland. It serves around 1,400 pupils drawn from four feeder primaries in the north-west of the city: Blackhall primary school, Clermiston primary school, Cramond and Davidson's Mains.

The school's profile has given it a flagship role in education, piloting such experiments as the introduction of the Certificate of Secondary Education, the provision of setting in English and mathematics, and the curricular integration of European Studies and the International Baccalaureate. The Royal High School was last inspected by Education Scotland in February 2023.

Pauline Walker is the current Rector, having taken on the role in 2014. She is the second woman to lead the school, following Jane Frith.

== History ==
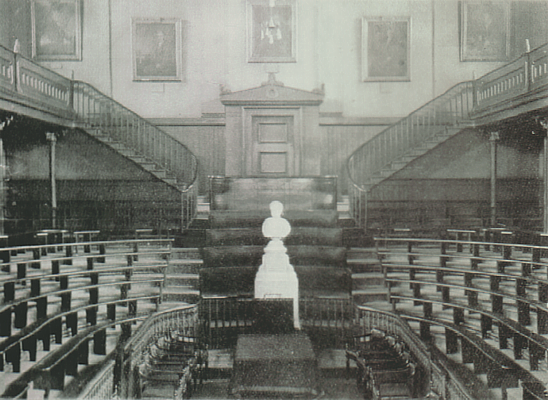
The Hall at Regent Road.

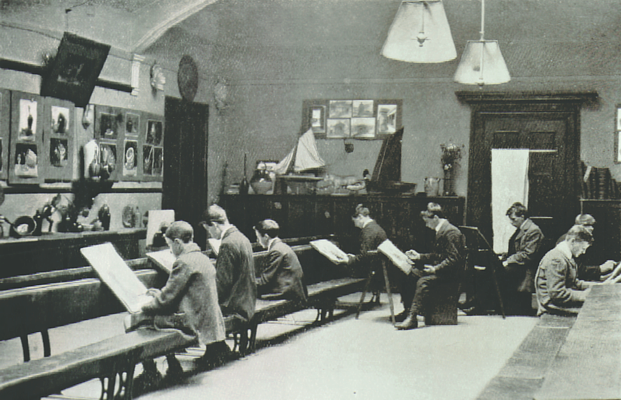
The Art Room before the First World War.

The Royal High School is, by one reckoning, the 18th-oldest school in the world, with a history of almost 900 years. Historians associate its birth with the flowering of the 12th century renaissance. It first enters the historical record as the seminary of Holyrood Abbey, founded for Alwin and the Augustinian canons by David I in 1128.

The Grammar School of the Church of Edinburgh, as it was known by the time Adam de Camis was rector in 1378, grew into a church-run burgh institution providing a Latin education for the sons of landed and burgess families, many of whom pursued careers in the church.

In 1505 the school was described as a high school, the first recorded use of this term in either Scotland or England. In 1566, following the Reformation, Mary, Queen of Scots, transferred the school from the control of Holyrood Abbey to the Town Council of Edinburgh. James Lawson was a big influence in building work for the school in 1578 and from about 1590 James VI accorded it royal patronage as the Schola Regia Edimburgensis, or King's School of Edinburgh.

In 1584 the Town Council informed the rector, Hercules Rollock, that his aim should be "to instruct the youth in pietie, guid maneris, doctrine and letteris". As far as possible, instruction was carried out in Latin. The study of Greek began in 1614, and geography in 1742. The egalitarian spirit of Scotland and the classical tradition exerted a profound influence on the school culture and the Scottish Enlightenment.

The Romantic era at the turn of the 19th century was for Scotland a golden age of literature, winning the Royal High School an international reputation and an influx of foreign students, among them French princes. The historian William Ross notes: "Walter Scott stood head and shoulders above his literary contemporaries; the rector, Alexander Adam, held a similar position in his own profession." By the end of the Napoleonic Wars, an old scholar remembered, 'there were boys from Russia, Germany, Switzerland, the United States, Barbadoes, St. Vincent, Demerara, the East Indies, besides England and Ireland.' The Royal High School was used as a model for the first public high school in the United States, the English High School of Boston, in 1821.

Learning Greek ceased to be compulsory in 1836, and the time allotted to its study was reduced in 1839 as mathematics became recognised. The curriculum was gradually broadened to include French (1834), after-hours fencing and gymnastics (1843), German (1845), science (1848), drawing (1853), military drill (1865), English (1866), gymnastics as a formal subject and swimming (1885), music (1908), and history (1909). In 1866 classical masters were confined to teaching Latin and Greek. A modern and commercial course was introduced in 1873. A school choir was instituted in 1895.

Through the centuries, the school has been located at many sites throughout the city, including the Vennel of the Church of St. Mary in the Fields (c. 1503 – c. 1516); Kirk o' Field Wynd (c. 1516–1555); Cardinal Beaton's House in Blackfriars Wynd (1555–1569); the Collegiate Church of St. Giles or St. Mary in the Fields (1569–1578); Blackfriars monastery (1578–1777); High School Yards (1777–1829); the famous Regent Road building on Calton Hill (1829–1968); and Jock's Lodge (1931–1972). The Jock's Lodge site is now the Royal High Primary, and is no longer associated with the secondary school.

For many years the school maintained a boarding facility for pupils from outside Edinburgh. The boarders ranged in age from six to eighteen. The House, as it was known, was located at 24 Royal Terrace and in later years moved to 13 Royal Terrace. When the boarding house was closed the records of all boarders, the artefacts such as the board with the names of head boys, and the memorial to boarders killed in the 1939–1945 war, were lost.

The Royal High School moved to its current site at Barnton in 1968, vacating the Old Royal High School buildings. In 1973 it became a co-educational state comprehensive. The school's premises underwent extensive refurbishment between 2001 and 2003, funded by a £10 million public-private partnership project with Amey plc.

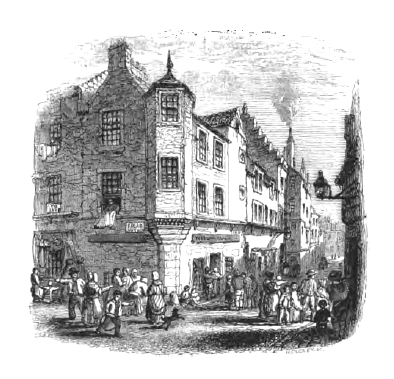
Cardinal Beaton's House, Blackfriars Wynd (1555–1569)

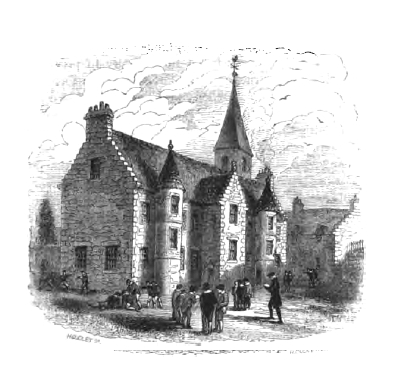
Blackfriars Monastery (1578–1777)

High School Yards (1777–1829)

Regent Road, Calton Hill (1829–1968)

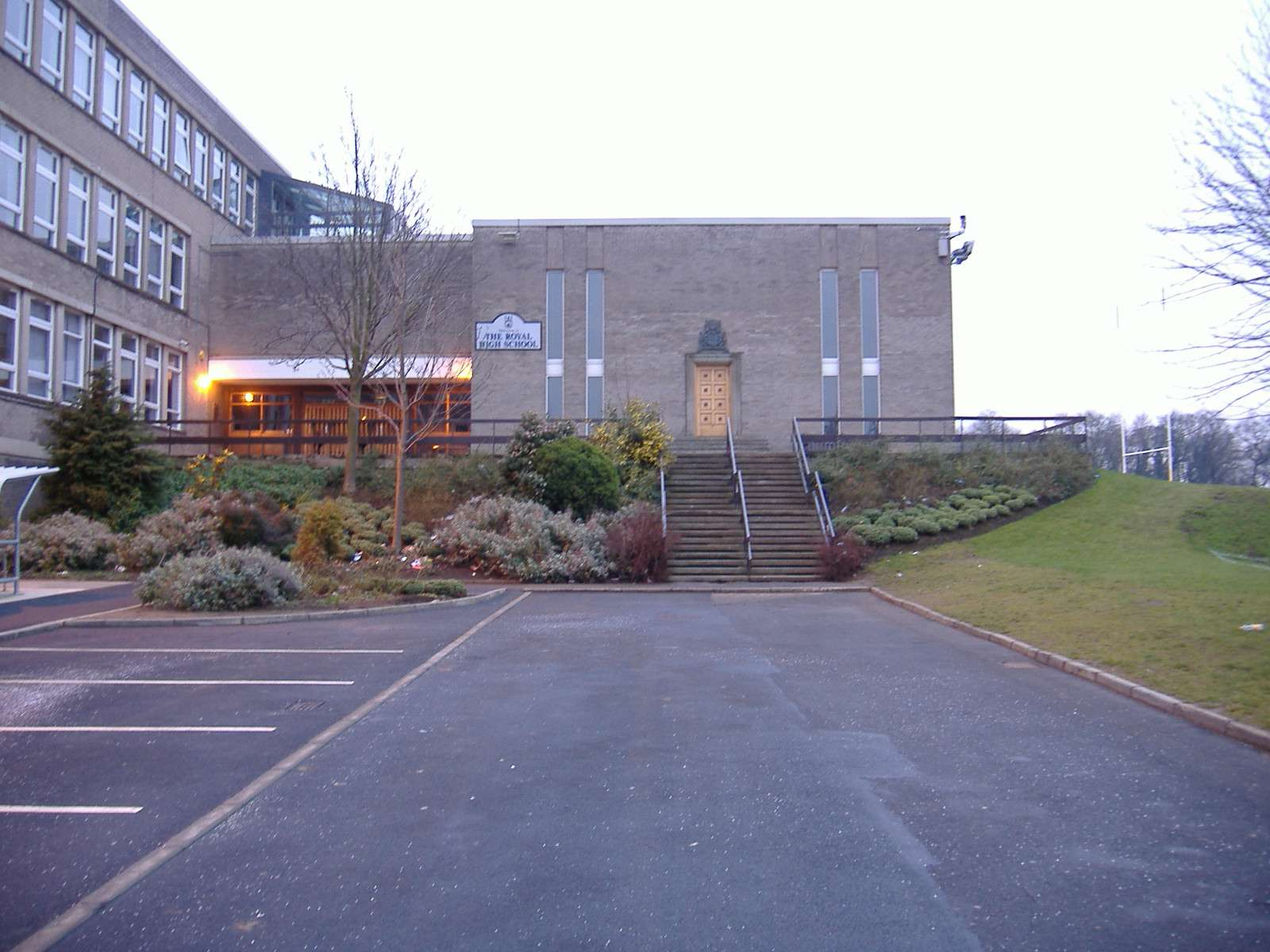
Barnton (1968–present)

== Academics ==
The most recent report was February 2023. Education Scotland found "very high standard of attainment for all young people", "Young people have a very strong understanding of diversity and equality," and "exceptional contribution of young people to bringing about positive changes to the school." Pupils scored highly in national examinations, consistently outperforming those in comparator schools as well as the Edinburgh and national averages.

130 university entrants from the Royal High School or 30.1% went to one of the ‘Sutton 13' top UK universities in the five years between 2002 and 2006, second among Scottish state schools and colleges. In 2006 the Royal High School's ranking for Higher grades was joint third in the Edinburgh state school league tables (joint seventeenth nationally in the state school rankings).

The school has dropped down 11 places, out of the top 20, in the Scottish schools rankings since 2009 since the new rector took over.

== Traditions ==
The school uniform is black and white, derived from the municipal colours of Edinburgh. Girls wear a plain white blouse, school tie, black blazer with crest, black skirt or trousers, black tights and black polished shoes. The boys' uniform consists of a plain white shirt, school tie, black blazer with crest, black trousers and black polished shoes. The school blazer is a compulsory part of the uniform and children are allowed to wear other jackets as long as they are not worn inside the building. A black and white striped tie is standard for the lower years; a plain black tie denotes a Sixth Year. The school badge features the school motto and the embattled triple-towered castle of the school arms. When full colours are awarded to a pupil a new pocket is attached to the blazer with the school emblem embroidered in silver wire with the dates of the present academic year either side of the badge. Pupils wear uniform within school and at official functions where they represent the school.

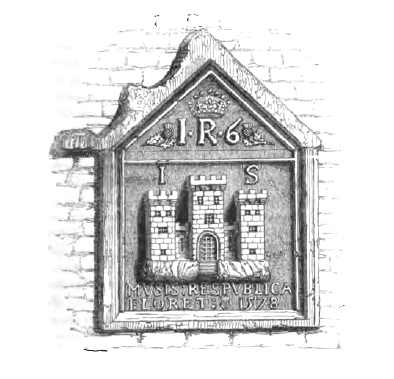
Carved stone from the Blackfriars Pediment (1578)

The prefect system was established in 1915.

The Royal High School armorial bearings derive from the shield of the city arms, and antedate the Act of Parliament on the subject in 1672. Their simple early form can be seen on a carved stone formerly set above the principal entrance to the school at Blackfriars in 1578. The pediment from the 1578 building was incorporated into the Regent Road building in 1897.

The present design was matriculated by the Lord Lyon in 1920. The description reads: 'Sable, a castle triple towered and embattled argent, masoned of the first, windows and doors open gules set upon a rock proper. Above the shield is placed a helmet befitting its degree with a mantling sable doubled argent and in a scroll over the same this motto Musis Respublica Floret (The State Flourishes with the Muses).' The W.C.A. Ross memorial crest displaying the school arms was unveiled at the main entrance at Barnton in 1973.

The Royal High School song is Vivas Schola Regia, written in 1895.

== Sports and games ==
That Act of Council in 1851, which freed our Saturdays, should be held in high esteem by all our athletes, for it is the Magna Carta of our Cricket and Football Clubs. It rendered possible the formation of a cricket club in 1861, to be followed seven years later by a football club.

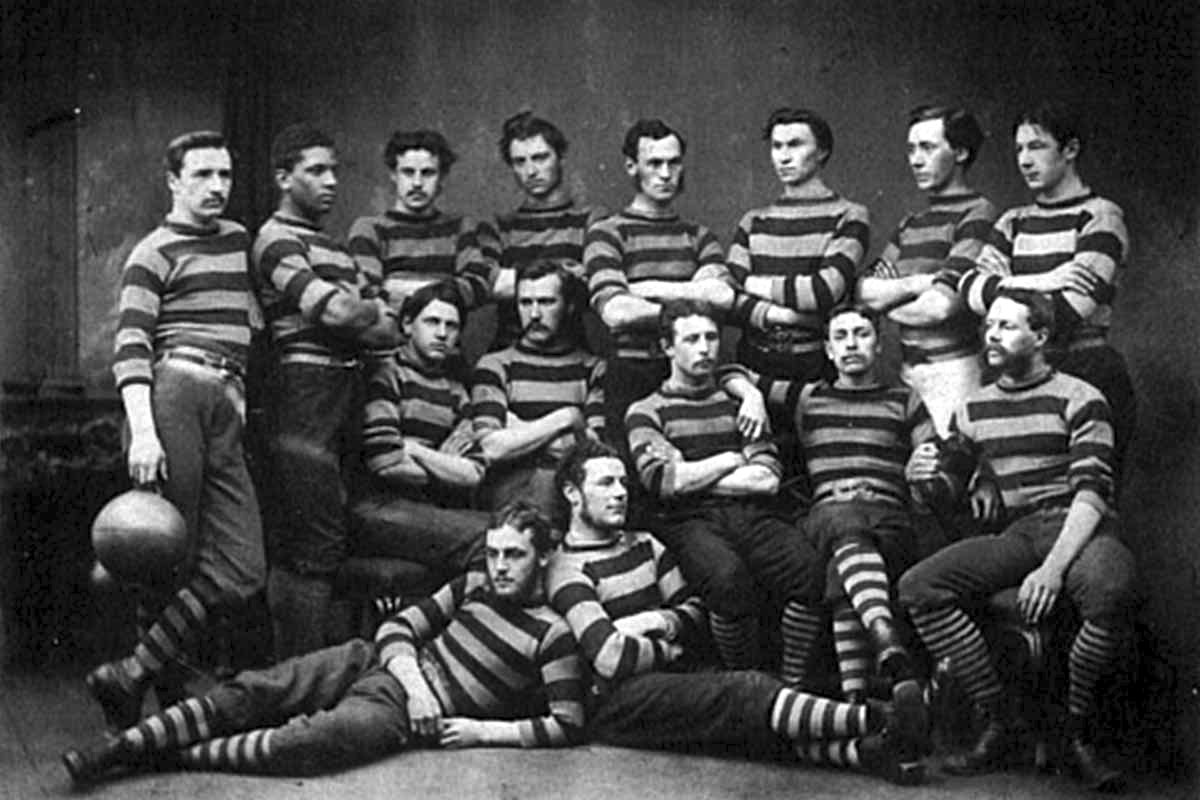
RHS rugby team of 1871

The Royal High School had many sporting clubs which have mainly been disbanded. The RHS Cricket Club was formed in 1861. The RHS Rugby Football Club was formed in 1868. The RHS Golf Club was formed in 1876. The RHS Athletic Club was formed in 1920. The RHS Bike Club was formed in 2011. These clubs were pioneered by former and attending pupils, who originally played their games together. Among the student founders of cricket and football at the school were Taverner Knott and Nat Watt, who undertook their labours with the encouragement of Thomson Whyte, reportedly the first master to take a serious interest in sport at the school. The sporting clubs were formally integrated into the school body when, in 1900, at the request of the club captains, two masters undertook the management of cricket and rugby.

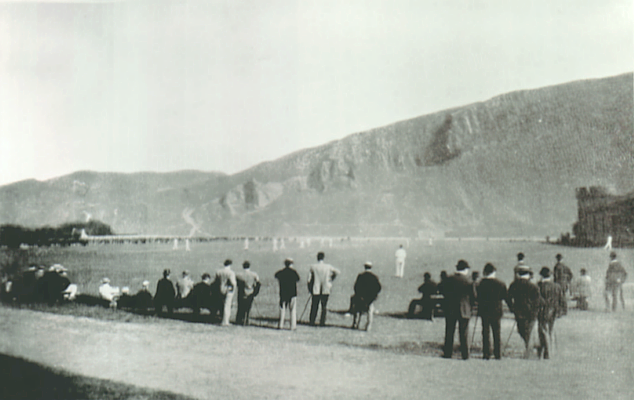
Holyrood Cricket Ground in the late 19th century.

The school's annual games date from the early 1860s, following Queen Victoria's grant of Holyrood Field to the school for use as a cricket field in 1860. At first the organisation of the games was undertaken by the masters, but at the request of the rector, James Donaldson, the burden was assumed by the cricket club, which carried it until the outbreak of the First World War.

The nations system was introduced in 1912 by a later rector, William J. Watson. This has continued to the present day. On joining the school every pupil is allotted membership in one of four school houses, known as nations, named after the gentes or primordial peoples from the infancy of the Scottish state: Angles, Britons, Picts and Scots. Siblings are members of the same nation. The nations originally competed against each other in athletics, cricket and rugby, the champion nation being awarded the school shield for the annual session. This system has evolved over time to include other extracurricular interests, such as drama and music.

Conceived as a character-building exercise, the annual games and nations system were intended to foster a team spirit and encourage physical activity among all pupils. Within each nation, masters were appointed to committees to develop Under 15 and Under 13 cricket and rugby teams, and to broaden participation beyond the First XI and XV by training pupils of every level of ability. The competitive scheme proved popular with pupils and teachers and has since been expanded to encompass a wide variety of games, sports and other extracurricular activities, held throughout the year. Nation badges were introduced in 1928.

Today the nations compete for the Crichton Cup. This was first presented as a trophy for the inter-nation squadron swimming race in 1914 by J. D. Crichton, whose sons were at the school. In 1920 it was transferred to the nation championship in scholarship and athletics combined.

Earlier generations of Royal High Scholars had played their own schoolyard game, known as clacken from the wooden bat used by players, and as late as the 1880s 'no High School boy considered his equipment complete unless the wooden clacken hung to his wrist as he went and came', but the rise of national games, especially rugby, the grant of Holyrood Field for cricket in 1860, and the construction of a gymnasium and swimming bath in 1885, meant the ancient Royal High Schoolyard game was extinct by 1911.

== Notable alumni ==
Former pupils have made countless contributions to national life; amongst these names are:

- Robert Adam (1728–1792), architect
- Alexander Graham Bell (1847–1922), inventor
- Henry Peter Brougham (1778–1868), British statesman and Lord Chancellor.
- Eric Brown (pilot) (1919–2016), former Royal Navy officer and test pilot; first pilot to land on an Aircraft carrier
- John Burnet (1863 - 1928), classicist
- Ian Charleson (1949–1990). stage, TV and film actor (Chariots of Fire, Gandhi)
- Robin Cook (1946–2005), politician
- Thomas Coutts (1735–1822), banker
- Ronnie Corbett (1930–2016), comedian
- John Cruickshank V. C., Royal Air Force officer
- Thomas Doherty, actor
- William Drummond of Hawthornden (1585-1649), poet
- Henry Dundas, Home Secretary and Chancellor of the Exchequer
- Robert Fergusson (1750–-1774), poet
- Eric Lomax, military officer and author of The Railway Man
- John Menzies, businessman
- James Hall Nasmyth, inventor of the steam hammer and the Nasmyth telescope
- Robert Nasmyth, dentist to Queen Victoria in Scotland.
- David Olive, physicist
- David Robb (1947– ), stage, TV and film actor
- Sir Walter Scott Bt. (1771–1832), author
- Archibald Campbell Tait (1881–1881), Archbishop of Canterbury.
- Anthony Todd Thomson (1778–1849), Scottish doctor and pioneer of dermatology.

=== Wartime service ===
Many former pupils won naval, military or air force awards. Schoolfellows who died in battle are commemorated by the memorial porch and brass tablets in the school hall. The upper architrave of the marble Doric portico is inscribed with a phrase from Simonides: ΟΥΔΕ ΤΕΘΝΑΣΙ ΘΑΝΟΝΤΕΣ. They died but are not dead.

=== Class clubs ===
The Royal High School clubs of the 18th and early 19th centuries were class clubs, formed by cohorts of old boys who had studied for four years under one master before being taken under the rector's wing in their fifth. The names of some of the last class clubs are immortalised in the school prizes they endowed, such as the Boyd Prize (1857) now awarded to the Dux of Form I, the Macmillan Club Prize (1865), a gold watch now awarded to the Dux in English, and the Carmichael Club Medal (1878), now given to the Dux of Form III. However, because the traditional cohort system was governed by independent masters with separate student followings, the club classes did little to foster a common school spirit.

Thus, even after 1808, when fourteen former pupils of Dr. Alexander Adam banded together as the first High School Club and commissioned Henry Raeburn to paint a portrait of their master as a gift to the school, the old independence resurfaced again, in 1859, when the five surviving members handed over the priceless masterpiece to the Scottish National Gallery. The school instituted legal proceedings against the club, but in the end had to make do with a Cruickshank copy of the original, presented in 1864.

=== School clubs ===
Today the Royal High School has three flourishing former pupils' clubs in the United Kingdom. The present Royal High School Club was founded in 1849 under the presidency of Robert Dundas Haldane-Duncan, 1st Earl of Camperdown. The first annual report, dated July 1850, contains the original constitution, clause IV of which states: 'The objects of the Club shall be generally to promote the interests of the High School, maintain a good understanding, and form a bond of union among the former Pupils of that institution.' Known in the beginning, like its predecessor, simply as the High School Club, it adopted its full name in 1907. Since 1863 the club has given an annual prize at the school games. It also pays for the framings of engravings of former pupils and other art works which decorate the walls of the school.

The Royal High School Club in London was founded in 1889. On the occasion of its 70th anniversary dinner (1959) the Scotsman reported: 'We believe the London Club is indeed the oldest Scottish School Club in existence in London – among the members are No. 111 The Prince of Wales, Sandringham.'

The third former pupils club in the UK is the Royal High School Achievers Society.

The Royal High School (Canada) Club was formed in Winnipeg in 1914, and after lapsing into inactivity because of the war it was revived in British Columbia in 1939. The Royal High School (India) Club was formed in 1925 to help former pupils in the east; it disbanded in 1959. The Royal High School (Malaya) Club flourished between the two world wars and was revived in the 1950s.

== European partnerships ==
The Royal High School has international relationships through regular musical exchanges with sister cities on the Continent such as Florence (from 1975) and Munich (from 1979), and with other schools such as the Theodolinden-Gymnasium, Munich (from 1979), the Lycée Antoine-de-Saint Exupéry, Lyon (from 1991) and the Scuola di Musica ‘Giuseppe Verdi’, Prato (from 1993). In 1992 the school was awarded a European Curriculum Award by the British Government in recognition of its contribution to the development of European awareness in education, in part due to the Baccalaureate.

== Publications ==
Cover of the 1986 issue of Schola Regia, featuring the School's Memorial Door.

The official school magazine is Schola Regia. This is a vox discipuli that enables pupils to air their views and showcase their literary and artistic talents. It features news and creative input from all sections of the school community, including regular club reports and interviews with famous former pupils. The journal is produced by an editorial committee of student volunteers, usually with the assistance of a teacher from the English department. It is partly financed by commercial advertising and is published in the autumn. The Malcolm Knox Prize is awarded annually for the best contribution.

The first, short-lived, school magazine was published in 1886. Like its successor, it was subsidised by the school club. The maiden issue of Schola Regia appeared in 1895 and the present series began in 1904. The magazine's archive is both a repository of irreverent anecdotes about school life and a valuable source for history in a larger sense. The wartime volumes contain many letters from former pupils serving at the front.

The Royal High School also publishes an Annual Report at the end of the school session in June/July. As the school's main publication of record, it contains future session dates, a staff list, the rector's report, a programme for the commemoration day ceremony, a list of awards, and a report from each subject detailing staffing, academic achievement and general events that went on in that subject in the past academic year. The rector's report was first published in 1846.

== Rectors ==
- 1128 Nominees of the Abbots of Holyrood
- 1519 David Vocat
- 1524 Henry Henryson, MA
- 1530 Adam Mure, MA
- 1545 Sir John Allan
- 1546 William Robertoun
- 1568 Thomas Buchanan, MA
- 1571 William Robertoun (again)
- 1584 Hercules Rollock, MA
- 1596 Alexander Hume, MA
- 1606 John Ray, MA
- 1630 Thomas Crawford, MA
- 1641 William Spence, MA
- 1650 Hew Wallace, MA
- 1656 John Muir, MA
- 1660 John Home, MA
- 1665 David Ferguson, MA
- 1669 Alexander Rutherford, MA
- 1672 Alexander Heriot, MA
- 1679 Archibald Guillane, MA
- 1680 William Skene, MA
- 1717 George Arbuthnot, MA
- 1735 John Lees, MA
- 1759 Alexander Matheson, MA
- 1768 Alexander Adam, LLD
- 1810 James Pillans, MA
- 1820 Aglionby Ross Carson, FRSE LLD
- 1845 Leonhard Schmitz, PhD, LLD
- 1865 James Donaldson, MA, LLD (later Sir James)
- 1882 John Marshall, MA, LLD
- 1909 William J. Watson, MA, LLD
- 1914 John Strong, CBE, FRSE MA, LLD
- 1919 William King Gillies, FRSE MA, LLD
- 1940 James J. Robertson, MA, BD (later Sir James)
- 1942 Albert H. R. Ball, MA
- 1948 David Stuart M. Imrie, MA, PhD
- 1965 Baillie T. Ruthven, MA
- 1972 Farquhar Macintosh, MA
- 1989 Matthew M. MacIver, MA
- 1998 George M. R. Smuga, MA
- 2009 Jane L. Frith, MA
- 2014 Pauline Walker BSc (Steven Raeburn and Jennifer Menzies acted from August to November 2024)

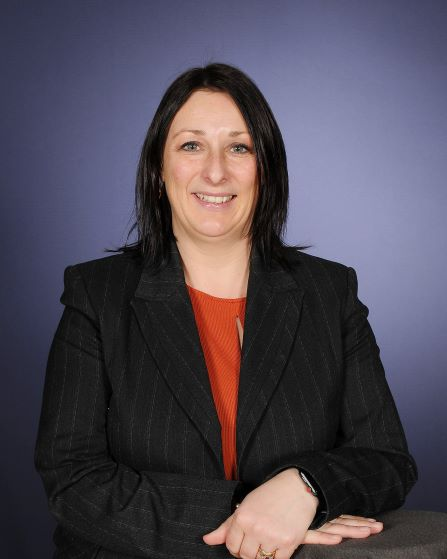
Official photo of the current rector, Pauline Walker

The school Rector, or Head Teacher, is responsible for the overall running and function of the school and plays a role in upholding the school's values and vision. This is supported by a team of Deputies, and together, the Rector and Deputies form the Senior Leadership Team (SLT).

The current Rector is Pauline Walker, who assumed the role in 2014. Walker is the second woman to head the school.

== Popular culture ==
Among the Royal High School's appearances in literature are the stories related in the Gentleman's Magazine, Walter Scott's Autobiography, Lord Cockburn's Memorials, Captain Basil Hall's Log Book of a Midshipman, George Borrow's Lavengro, George M'Crie's 1866 poem The Old High School, and William Boyd's The New Confessions.

The most celebrated of all is the 'Green-Breeks' episode in Scott's novel, Waverley, Appendix III (1814). The author, a pupil from 1779 to 1783, reminisces wistfully about the bicker, or traditional mass brawl, humorously likened to a Homeric battle, fought in the streets of Edinburgh between pupils from different social classes.

A school ballad, The Woeful Slaying of Bailie Macmoran, was founded on a school siege of 1595 known as the great barring-out. This turbulent history continues to inspire new work. Gentlemen's Bairns is a play by C. S. Lincoln which premiered at the Edinburgh Fringe in 2006. It dramatises the fatal shooting during the siege of a chief magistrate, John Macmoran, by a pupil, William Sinclair, a grandson of the Earl of Caithness. This incident is also taught as part of first year History curriculum.

== See also ==
- Old Royal High School, Edinburgh
- List of the oldest schools in the United Kingdom
- Category:People educated at the Royal High School, Edinburgh
