= Jack Clark (Scottish cricketer) =

Scottish cricketer

Personal information
- Full name: John Clark
- Born: 9 December 1943 (age 82); Greenock, Renfrewshire, Scotland
- Batting: Right-handed
- Bowling: Right-arm fast-medium

Domestic team information
- Years: Team
- 1969–1982: Scotland

Career statistics
Competition	First-class	List A
Matches	13	9
Runs scored	104	32
Batting average	8.00	10.66
100s/50s	–/–	–/–
Top score	29	18
Balls bowled	2,042	300
Wickets	43	4
Bowling average	18.60	46.00
5 wickets in innings	–	–
10 wickets in match	–	–
Best bowling	4/10	2/21
Catches/stumpings	13/–	–/–
- Source: Cricinfo, 16 July 2022

John Clark (born 9 December 1943) is a Scottish former first-class cricketer.

== Biography ==
Clark was born at Greenock in December 1943. He was educated at the Greenock Academy, before going up to Glasgow College of Technology. A club cricketer for Greenock Cricket Club, he made his debut for Scotland in a first-class cricket match against the touring New Zealanders at Glasgow in 1969. He played first-class cricket for Scotland until 1982, making thirteen appearances; ten of these came in the annual match versus Ireland, with Clark also playing against Warwickshire and the touring Sri Lankans. Playing as a right-arm fast-medium bowler in the Scottish side, Clark took 43 wickets at an average of 18.60, with best figures of 4 for 10. As a tailend batsman, he scored 104 runs across his thirteen matches, with a highest score of 29.

In addition to playing first-class cricket for Scotland, Clark also played List A one-day cricket, making his one-day debut against Derbyshire in the 1980 Benson & Hedges Cup. He played one-day cricket for Scotland until 1982, making nine appearances in the Benson & Hedges Cup. He was less effective as a bowler in one-day cricket, taking 4 wickets at an expensive average of exactly 46 runs per wicket. Clark was a passenger in a car driven by fellow cricketer Tom Black when it was involved in a car crash in 1979, with him escaping with minor injuries. Outside of cricket, he worked as a scientific officer in a medical laboratory.
