= Helen Preece =

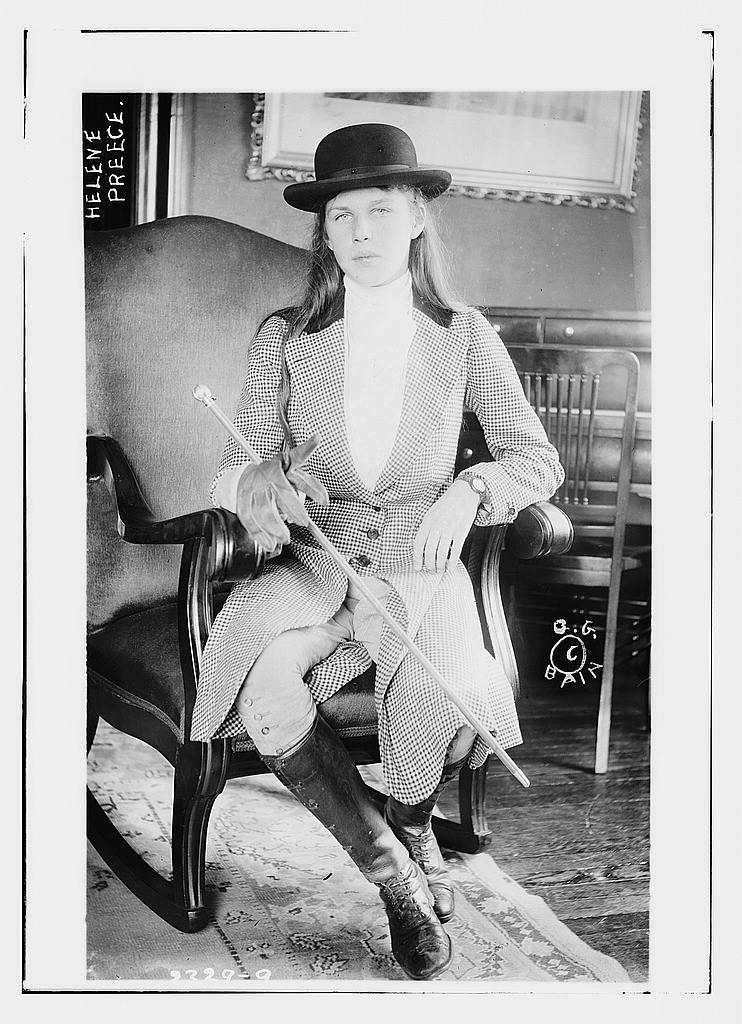
- Helen Preece circa 1913

Personal information
- Nationality: British
- Born: November 11, 1895
- Died: July 2, 1990 (aged 94)

Sport
- Sport: Equestrian

Achievements and titles
- Olympic finals: 1912 (Rejected)

Helen Preece Chipchase Smith (1897 - 1990) was a British equestrian who also rode in America. She was the only woman briefly entered in the 1912 Summer Olympics.

== Biography ==
She was the daughter of Ambrose Preese, of Fulham road, London. Her mother was considered a "noted horsewoman" in England. In June 1910, she did well in the Olympia Horse Show. In the next Olympia Horse Show, in June 1911, she was considered a "favorite" and was personally congratulated by Queen Alexandra afterward. In November 1911, she won the gold cup at the Madison Square National Horse Show in New York City. At the show, she rode the horses, Sapelio, owned by George Chipchase and the winning Sceptre, owned by James Dunn.

In 1912, while still in school, she attempted to enter the modern pentathlon in the 1912 Summer Olympic Games. For a short time, she was the only woman slated to compete at the games. She was ultimately not allowed to compete because she was a female. The response from the Olympic committee to her request to enter was "hostile."

In 1914, she placed second in Ladies' saddle horse riding and first in Park and road hacks, riding on Sceptre.

On March 20, 1915, she married George H. Chipchase in New York. A few months later, his former wife sued Preese in a Massachusetts court for using the Chipchase name and also claiming that there had been no divorce.

In December 1934, she was married again in Boston to John Leslie Smith, a riding instructor.
