= Pryce =

Pryce may refer to:

== Surname ==
- David Pryce-Jones (born 1936), British author and commentator
- Deborah Pryce (born 1951), United States, Ohio congresswoman
- Guto Pryce (born 1972), Welsh bass guitarist for Super Furry Animals
- Jason Pryce (born 1984), Jamaican businessman and husband of female Jamaican Olympic sprinter Shelly-Ann Fraser-Pryce
- Sir John Pryce, 1st Baronet (c. 1596–c. 1657), Welsh parliamentarian
- Jonathan Pryce (born 1947), Welsh actor
- Karl Pryce (born 1986), English rugby player
- Kelly Pryce (born 1976/77), American stand-up comedian
- Leon Pryce (born 1981), English rugby player (older brother to Karl)
- Malcolm Pryce (born 1960), British novelist
- Richard Pryce (1864–1942), English novelist
- Roland Fremont Pryce (1906-1984), United States naval officer
- Thomas Tannatt Pryce (1886–1918), British captain, World War I
- Simon Pryce, (born 1972), Australian entertainer of The Wiggles
- Tom Pryce (1949–1977), British Formula One racing driver
- Vicky Pryce (born 1952), Greek-born British economist
- William Thornton Pryce (1932–2006), United States diplomat

== In fiction ==
- Pryce (Pokémon), Pokémon character
- Wesley Wyndam-Pryce, fictional character for the American television programs, Buffy the Vampire Slayer and Angel
- Arihnda Pryce, an Imperial governor in the animated television series Star Wars Rebels and the novel Star Wars: Thrawn
