= Frank Robertson (cricketer) =

Scottish cricketer and architect

Personal information
- Full name: Frank Robertson
- Born: 25 February 1944 (age 82); Aberdeen, Aberdeenshire, Scotland
- Batting: Right-handed
- Bowling: Right-arm fast-medium

Domestic team information
- Years: Team
- 1971–1981: Scotland

Career statistics
Competition	First-class	List A
Matches	12	6
Runs scored	163	11
Batting average	10.18	11.00
100s/50s	–/1	–/–
Top score	51	6*
Balls bowled	1,686	312
Wickets	36	7
Bowling average	20.63	27.71
5 wickets in innings	2	–
10 wickets in match	–	–
Best bowling	6/58	2/34
Catches/stumpings	3/–	1/–
- Source: Cricinfo, 21 June 2022

Frank Robertson (born 25 February 1944) is a Scottish former cricketer and architect.

Robertson was born at Aberdeen in February 1944 and was educated in the city at Robert Gordon's College. After completing his education, Robertson studied architecture and obtained his diploma in 1970, being admitted into the Royal Institute of British Architects. He was employed by the firm Thomson Taylor Craig & Donald, becoming a partner in 1985.

A club cricketer for Aberdeenshire Cricket Club, Robertson made his debut for Scotland in first-class cricket against Ireland at Belfast in 1971. He was a regular member of the Scottish side of the 1970s, featuring in ten first-class matches during that decade, and two more in 1980 and 1981; nine of these came against Ireland, but he also featured against the touring New Zealanders, Pakistanis and Sir Lankans. Playing primarily as a right-arm fast-medium bowler, he took 36 wickets in first-class cricket at an average of 20.63; he twice took a five wicket haul, with best figures of 6 for 58 coming on debut against Ireland. As a batsman, he scored 163 runs with a highest score of 51. In addition to playing first-class cricket for Scotland, Robertson also appeared in six List A one-day matches across the 1980 and 1981 Benson & Hedges Cup's, taking 7 wickets at an average of 27.71.
