= Clydeview Academy =

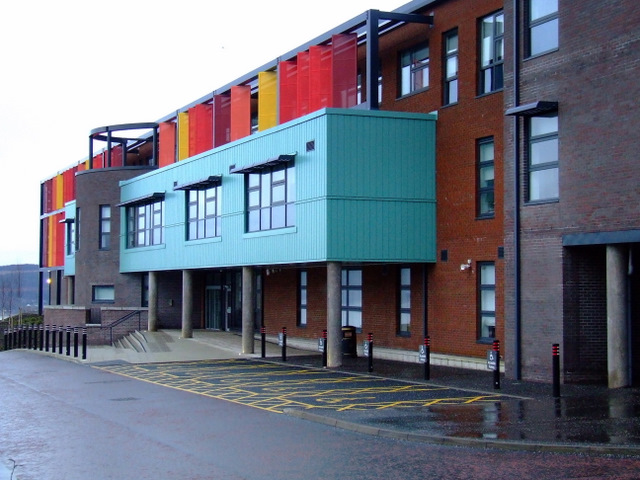

Location
- Burnside Road; Gourock, Inverclyde, PA19 1UX; Scotland; 55.9517°N 4.8020°W

Information
- Type: Secondary School
- Established: 2011
- Head teacher: Craig Gibson
- Age: 11 to 18
- Enrolment: 881
- Colour: Purple / white
- Website: http://clydeviewacademy.inverclyde.sch.uk/

Clydeview Academy is a non-denominational secondary school situated in Gourock, Inverclyde. It was founded in 2011 and opened to pupils on 17 August 2011. The first head teacher of the school was William Todd.

The school is a modern merger of two secondary schools from the local area, Greenock Academy and Gourock High School which both closed at the end of the 2010 summer term. The school is founded on the old site of St. Columbas High School, Gourock which is known as the Bayhill site. The feeder schools are: Greenock; Ardgowan Primary School, Gourock; Moorfoot Primary School and Gourock Primary School.
