= Isaac Arthur Preece =

British brewing scientist

Isaac Arthur Preece FRSE FRIC FIBiol

Personal details
- Born: 19 March 1907 Birmingham, England
- Died: 12 August 1964 (aged 57) Switzerland
- Occupation: Biochemist, brewing scientist

Isaac Arthur Preece (19 March 1907 – 12 August 1964) was a British biochemist and brewing scientist. He was the first person to suggest the addition of ammonium sulphate in the brewing process.

== Life ==
He was born on 19 March 1907 at 90 Worcester Street in Birmingham the son of Isaac Arthur Preece, a bassinette maker, and his wife, Isabel Wright. He was educated at Birmingham Central Secondary School.

He studied chemistry at Birmingham University gaining two postgraduate doctorates (DSc and PhD). From around 1930 he began lecturing in biochemistry, with an emphasis on brewing, at Heriot Watt University. He was here for his entire working life, being given the unique role of Professor of Brewing and applied Biochemistry.

In the Second World War he took on a government role as Senior Gas Identification Officer.

In 1949 he was elected a Fellow of the Royal Society of Edinburgh. His proposers were James Cameron Smail, William Ogilvy Kermack, Guy Frederic Marrian and Hugh Bryan Nisbet.

He died on 12 August 1964 in Switzerland aged 57.

== Publications ==
- Barley and Malt: Biology, Biochemistry, Technology (1930)
- The Biochemistry of Brewing (1954)
- Malting, Brewing and Allied Processes (1960)

== Family ==
He was married to Dorothy Maud Banner in the 1930s.

His children included the statistician Donald Arthur Preece (1939–2014).
