= St Columba's High School, Gourock =

Coordinates: 55°57′7″N 4°48′0″W

St. Columba's High School
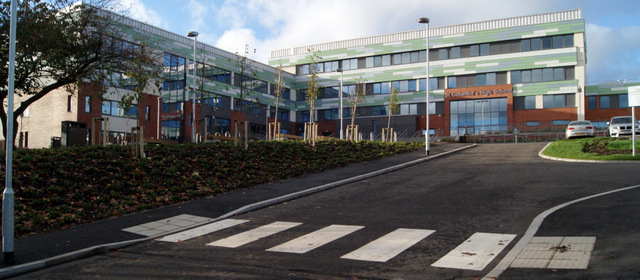

Location
- Fletcher Avenue; Gourock, Renfrewshire; Scotland

Information
- Type: Comprehensive secondary
- Established: 16 June 1933
- Local authority: Inverclyde
- Head teacher: Nicola Devine
- Gender: Co-ed
- Age: 11 to 18
- Enrolment: 682
- Colours: Blue, black
- Website: blogs.glowscotland.org.uk/in/schswebsite/

St Columba's High School is a co-educational six-year Roman Catholic, comprehensive secondary school, located next to Tower Hill Gourock, Inverclyde, Scotland. The school serves south west Greenock, Gourock, Inverkip and Wemyss Bay. The current enrolment (2018) is 682 pupils, with notable alumni including actor Martin Compston, as well as current MSYP for Inverclyde, Matthew Quinn.

The school won the Platinum Award in Enterprise Inverclyde Standards and Quality Report 2005/2006. The school also received top marks from the last visit by Her Majesty's Inspectorate of Education. It is also the first school in Inverclyde to receive Charter Mark status, for providing outstanding customer service.

== History ==
The original school dates back to 1909, however St. Columba's in its current form was officially opened by Archbishop Donald Mackintosh of Glasgow, on 16 June 1933. Construction of the building, which was located on Peat Road in Greenock, took only 1 year and 3 days from the initial foundation work to the official opening, having cost £50,000 including roads and fittings. The school moved to a new building in the Bayhill area of Gourock in 1971. In 2009, the school temporarily returned to Greenock where it occupied the former Greenock High School building while the former Gourock High School building on Fletcher Avenue in Gourock was being refurbished as a permanent home for St Columba's. The refurbished school at Tower Hill opened in 2013, the refurbishment having cost $6 million.

== Campus ==
The main teaching block is a refurbished 1960s building which has been extended to provide facilities for wood- and metalwork classes, as well as those for ICT. The campus also includes gymnasia and fitness suites in its PE department. There are football pitches towards the back of the school building, and the building also contains a refurbished library.

== Associated primary schools ==
- St Andrews Primary School, Greenock
- St Joseph's Primary School, Greenock
- St Ninian's Primary School, Gourock

Although not officially feeder schools, St. Columba's also receives some pupils from non-denominational schools within their catchment area, such as:

- Wemyss Bay Primary School, Wemyss Bay
- Inverkip Primary School, Inverkip

== Notable alumni ==
- Martin Compston (b. 1984) - actor
