= Maxwell Hutchinson =

English architect, broadcaster, and Anglican deacon

The Reverend Maxwell Hutchinson

President of the Royal Institute of British Architects
- In office 1989–1991
- Preceded by: Rod Hackney
- Succeeded by: Richard MacCormac

Personal details
- Born: John Maxwell Hutchinson; 3 December 1948 (age 77) Grantham, Lincolnshire, England
- Citizenship: United Kingdom
- Education: Wellingborough Preparatory School; Oundle School
- Alma mater: Scott Sutherland School of Architecture; Architectural Association School of Architecture

John Maxwell Hutchinson (born 3 December 1948) is an English architect, broadcaster, and Anglican deacon. He is a former president of the Royal Institute of British Architects (RIBA).

== Early life and education ==
Hutchinson was born in Grantham, Lincolnshire to Frank Maxwell Hutchinson and his wife Elizabeth Ross (née Wright).

His father, Frank, was an architect and died on 28 June 1977 in Nottingham. His father was a major in the Royal Engineers in the war, being the son of William John Hutchinson of Bridgend House in Thurso. His father lived at 2 Lancaster Gardens, in the Somerby Hill area of south-east Grantham. His father attended Scott Sutherland School of Architecture and Built Environment. His mother, Elizabeth Ross Muir Wright, was the daughter of Robert Wright of 'Prem Kutir' on Clydesdale Road in Mossend, and married on 17 August 1936, at West End Church, in Bellshill. His mother, who later lived at 8 Hillside Drive in Grantham, remarried. His mother died in 1987 in Grantham.

His maternal grandparents Robert Wright died, aged 72, on 7 July 1937, and Janet Muir Wright died on 11 December 1947, aged 80. His paternal grandfather, William John Hutchinson, died in Thurso in February 1941. His grandfather owned Thurso Engineering and Foundry.

Hutchinson was educated at two independent schools in Northamptonshire: at Wellingborough Preparatory School, a day school in the market town of Wellingborough, followed by Oundle School, a boarding independent school in the market town of Oundle. He studied architecture at the Scott Sutherland School of Architecture in Aberdeen and the Architectural Association School of Architecture in Bedford Square, London, gaining a diploma from the latter in 1972. He joined the Royal Institute of British Architects (RIBA) in 1972.

== Career ==
=== Architect ===
In 1972, Hutchinson founded Hutchinson & Partners. In 1993, he founded The Hutchinson Studio Architects. He was president of RIBA from 1989 to 1991. From 1987 to 1989, he was Chairman of the Industrial Building Bureau (based in Hemel Hempstead). From 1990 to 1992, he was vice-Chairman of the Construction Industry Council.

Hutchinson is the concept architect and inventor of The Alpha House. He is a practising architect of buildings including the following, all of which are in London, England:

- Skylines, Isle of Dogs
- JS Pathology's Headquarters, Camden Lock
- Aztec Row, Islington
- Pink Floyd's Britannia Row recording studios.

Hutchinson was also a visiting professor at the University of Westminster (1998–2000) and previously at the University of Nottingham (1993–1996) and Queen's University Belfast (1989–1993).

=== Pro-bono work ===
Hutchinson was caught up in the 2004 Boxing Day tsunami, and from this he conceived the idea for the charity Architects For Aid (A4A). The charity, was established and run by Dr Victoria Harris, the founder CEO, and later changed its named to Article 25, this being more inclusive of other related disciplines in the built environment. He currently sits on the Board of Trustees and is involved in the fundraising side of the charity. In October 2009, Hutchinson ran the Royal Parks Half Marathon with the proceeds going towards Article 25's projects throughout the world.

=== Broadcaster ===
Hutchinson is also a regular television broadcaster, being the best-known broadcasting architect in the UK. He wrote and presented three series for the Discovery Channel on architecture, engineering and science, and worked on BBC Two's First Sight and Restoration Nation.

Hutchinson has also presented Channel Four's Demolition Detectives, and wrote and presented No 57, The History of A House. He has also contributed to Carlton Television's The Good, The Bad and The Listed as well as Anglia Television's Hidden Heritage and on BBC Yorkshire's Inside Out programme. He was the local presenter for London for the BBC's Man-Made Wonders series in 2006. On 7 June 2009, he presented a Songs of Praise about the architecture of Trafalgar Square, meeting Ralph McTell and Bruce Kent.

Hutchinson is also a regular contributor to BBC Radio Four, as well as BBC Two's Newsnight, Robert Elms' show on BBC London 94.9 (semi-regularly on Sundays) and various programmes on LBC radio. On BBC Two, he presented How to Rescue a House, now seen on UKTV Style.

=== Ordained ministry ===
On 28 June 2014, Hutchinson was ordained in the Church of England as a deacon by Richard Chartres during a service at St Paul's Cathedral. From 2014 to 2016, he was a non-stipendiary minister at St John on Bethnal Green in the Diocese of London. Since 2016, he has been a curate of St Peter and St Paul, Chingford.

== Personal life ==
When in Aberdeen, Hutchinson played a multi-instrumentalist role in various bands including Cousin Mary with fellow architectural students, Iain Wolstenholme aka djRayC (bass and harmonica) and Martin Pottinger (drums and percussion). Guests at various times included Judge Smith and David Jackson (both of Van der Graaf Generator). With composer Smith on vocals, Cousin Mary recorded the demo for "Imperial Zeppelin" in 1969 (at a one-time Troggs' local countryside recording studio) subsequently released on album by co-composer Peter Hammill with Pottinger from the Cousin Mary band repeating his role on drums. The original demo eventually saw the light of day in 1991, when released by Judge Smith on his first solo CD, Democrazy.

Hutchinson also played guitar for some time for Lene Lovich, for whom Judge Smith wrote. He is a churchwarden of Our Most Holy Redeemer on Exmouth Market in Clerkenwell. He plays the piano, and composes music. He is married to Georgina May-Lee Burrell.

He moved to Empingham in 1985.

In February 2015, Hutchinson suffered a stroke and has had treatment at the Homerton Hospital and Mary Seacole House in London. He has made a good recovery and has returned to work, including broadcasting.

== Publications ==
- The Prince of Wales: Right or Wrong?: An architect replies (18 September 1989, Faber and Faber, foreword by Richard Rogers) ISBN 0-571-14287-7.
- Number 57: the history of a house (30 June 2003, Headline Book Publishing) ISBN 0-7553-1147-7.
