= Specialmoves =

British production studio

- Type: Private
- Industry: Interactive production
- Founded: Andover, Hampshire (1999)
- Headquarters: London
- Key people: Pascal Auberson
- Products: Interactive design and production services
- Revenue: £1,675,453 (2011)
- Owner: Darrell Wilkins (50%), Pascal Auberson (50%)
- Number of employees: 27
- Website: www.specialmoves.com

Specialmoves is an interactive production studio based in Exmouth Market, London. It has direct clients and works as a production resource for creative agencies and media owners. Specialmoves designs and builds websites and online marketing.

Darrell Wilkins founded Specialmoves in 1999. His classmates from the BSc MediaLab Arts (now DAT) Degree at Plymouth University, Pascal Auberson, James Norwood and David Burrows, joined the company in 2000.

It has won numerous awards for its work including D&AD, Cannes Lions and Creative Circle.
