= Water treatment =

Process that improves the quality of water

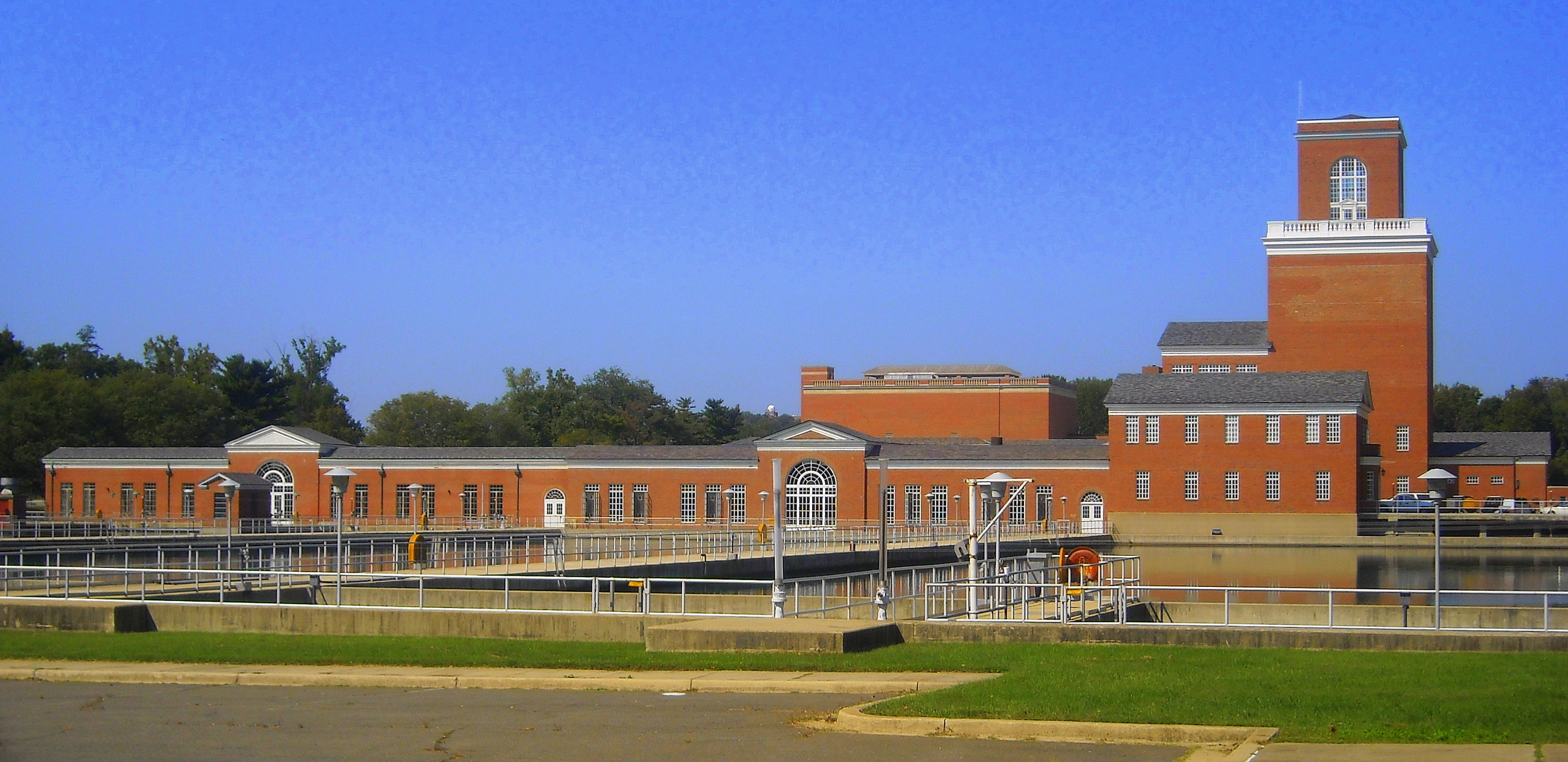
Dalecarlia Water Treatment Plant, Washington, D.C.

Water treatment is any process that improves the quality of water to make it appropriate for a specific end-use. The end use may be drinking, industrial water supply, irrigation, river flow maintenance, water recreation or many other uses, including being safely returned to the environment. Water treatment removes contaminants and undesirable components, or reduces their concentration so that the water becomes fit for its desired end-use. This treatment is crucial to human health and allows humans to benefit from both drinking and irrigation use.

Advanced water treatment methods have been developed in recent decades due to increased concerns about new pollutants like microplastics, pharmaceuticals, and per- and polyfluoroalkyl substances (PFAS). These include advanced oxidation processes, membrane filtration, and adsorption-based techniques utilizing materials like tailored nanomaterials and activated carbon. Additionally, energy efficiency, resource recovery, and sustainability in water treatment systems are receiving more attention, especially in areas where water is scarce and environmental demands are growing.

== Types ==
=== Drinking water treatment ===
Water contamination is primarily caused by the discharge of untreated wastewater from industrial and commercial activities. The effluent from various enterprises, which contains varying levels of contaminants, is dumped into rivers or other water resources. The wastewater may have a high proportion of organic and inorganic contaminants at the initial discharge. Industries generate wastewater as a result of fabrication processes, processes dealing with paper and pulp, textiles, chemicals, and from various streams such as cooling towers, boilers, and production lines.

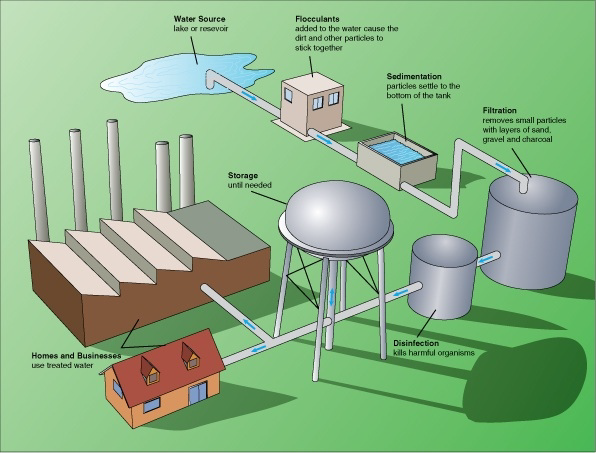
Typical drinking water treatment processes

Treatment for drinking water production involves the removal of contaminants and/or inactivation of any potentially harmful microbes from raw water to produce water that is pure enough for human consumption without any short term or long term risk of any adverse health effect. In general terms, the greatest microbial risks are associated with ingestion of water that is contaminated with human or animal (including bird) feces. Feces can be a source of pathogenic bacteria, viruses, protozoa and helminths. The removal or destruction of microbial pathogens is essential, and commonly involves the use of reactive chemical agents such as suspended solids, to remove bacteria, algae, viruses, fungi, and minerals including iron and manganese. Research including Professor Linda Lawton's group at Robert Gordon University, Aberdeen is working to improve detection of cyanobacteria. These substances continue to cause great harm to several less developed countries who do not have access to effective water purification systems.

Measures taken to ensure water quality not only relate to the treatment of the water, but to its conveyance and distribution after treatment. It is therefore common practice to keep residual disinfectants in the treated water to kill bacteriological contamination during distribution and to keep the pipes clean.

Water supplied to domestic properties such as for tap water or other uses, may be further treated before use, often using an in-line treatment process. Such treatments can include water softening or ion exchange.

=== Wastewater treatment ===
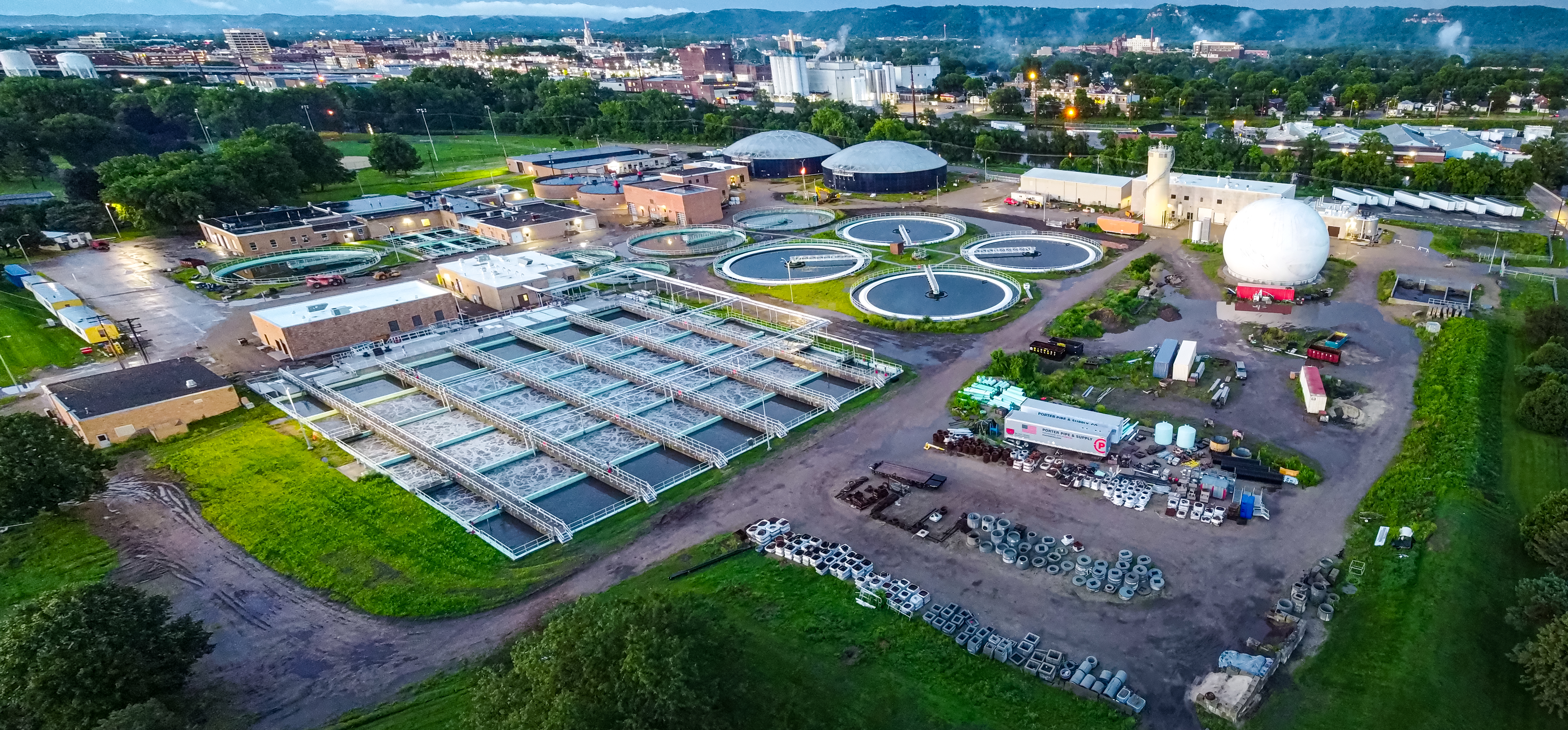
Sewage treatment plant (a type of wastewater treatment plant) in La Crosse, Wisconsin

Wastewater treatment is a process which removes contaminants from wastewater. The resulting effluent, discharged to a water body, has an acceptable impact on the environment. Domestic wastewater, also called municipal wastewater or sewage, is processed at a sewage treatment plant. Industrial wastewater is often processed at a specially-designed industrial wastewater treatment facility, or at a sewage treatment plant. In the latter case the industry typically performs on-site pretreatment of the waste, before it is sent to the municipal plant. Other types of wastewater treatment plants include agricultural wastewater treatment and leachate treatment plants.

The term "wastewater treatment" is often used to mean "sewage treatment".

Common processes in wastewater treatment include phase separation, such as sedimentation, various biological and chemical processes, such as oxidation, and polishing. The main by-product from wastewater treatment plants is a type of sludge that is usually treated in the same or another wastewater treatment plant. Biogas can be another by-product if the process uses anaerobic treatment.

=== Industrial water treatment ===
Water treatment is used to reduce impact on equipment used in industrial processes, such as heating, cooling, processing, cleaning, and rinsing so that operating costs and risks are reduced. Poor water treatment lets water interact with the surfaces of pipes and vessels which contain it. Steam boilers can scale up or corrode, and these deposits will mean more fuel is needed to heat the same amount of water. Cooling towers can also scale up and corrode, but left untreated, the warm, dirty water they can contain will encourage bacteria to grow, and Legionnaires' disease can be the fatal consequence. Water treatment is also used to improve the quality of water contacting the manufactured product (e.g., semiconductors) and/or can be part of the product (e.g., beverages, pharmaceuticals). In these instances, poor water treatment can cause defective products.

In many cases, effluent water from one process can be suitable for reuse in another process if given suitable treatment. This can reduce costs by lowering charges for water consumption, reduce the costs of effluent disposal because of reduced volume, and lower energy costs due to the recovery of heat in recycled wastewater.

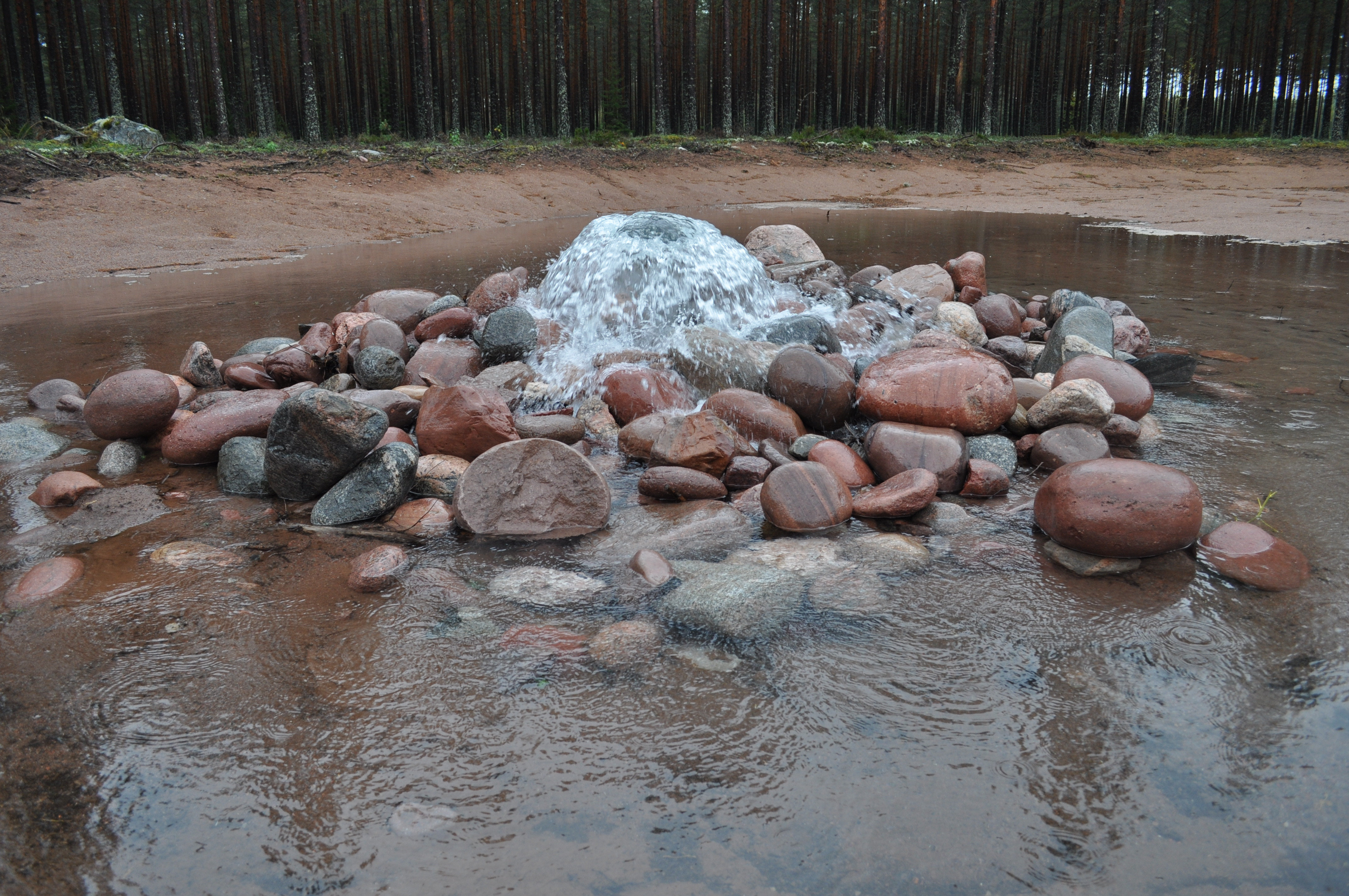
At Turun Seudun Vesi Oy's artificial groundwater plant, the pretreated raw water from the Kokemäki River is absorbed through the basins into the Virttaankangas ridge formation.

== Processes ==
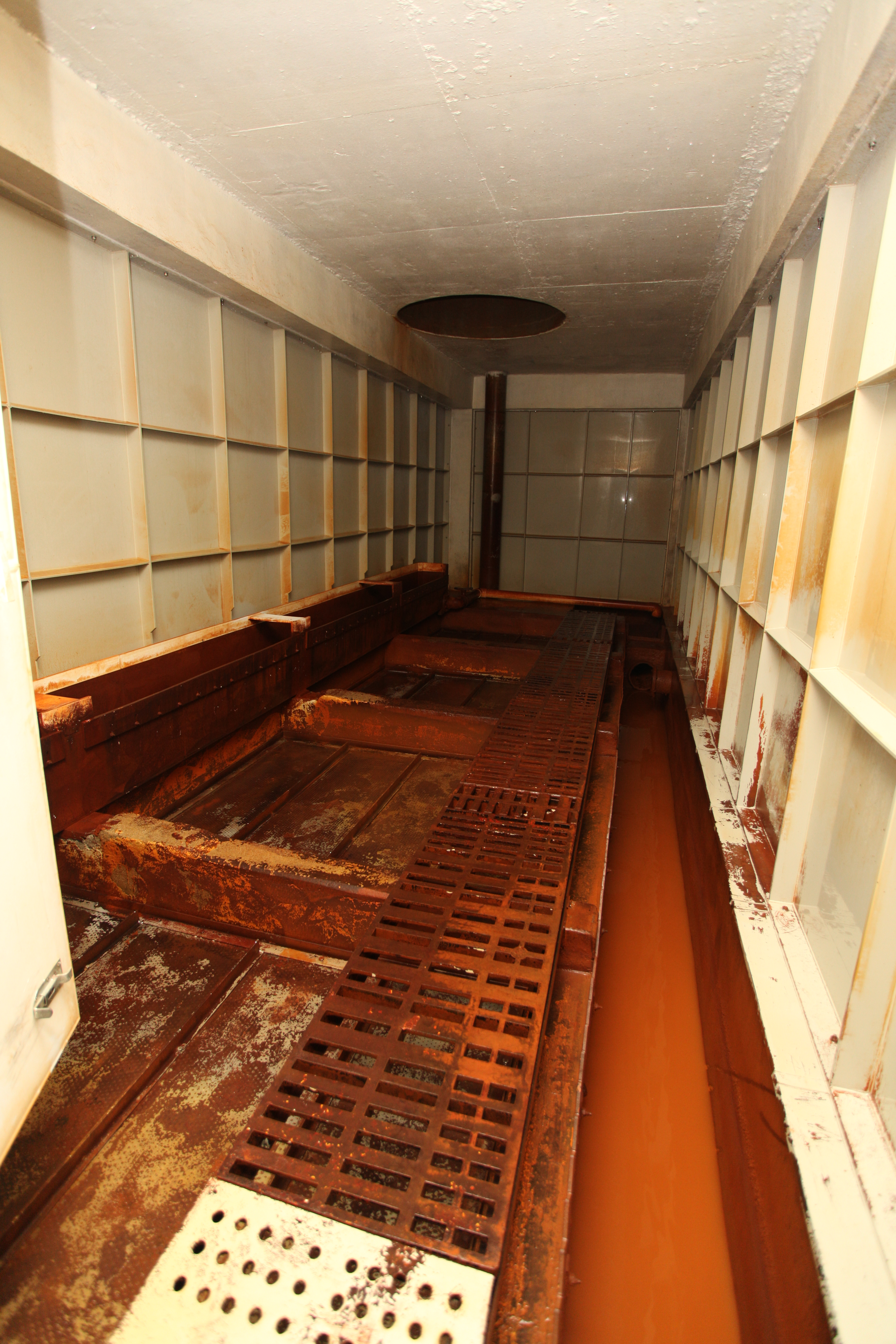
Empty aeration tank for iron precipitation

For the elimination of hazardous chemicals from the water, many treatment procedures have been applied.

The processes involved in removing the contaminants include physical processes such as settling and filtration, chemical processes such as disinfection and coagulation, and biological processes such as slow sand filtration.

A combination selected from the following processes (depending on the season and contaminants and chemicals present in the raw water) is used for municipal drinking water treatment worldwide.

=== Chemical ===
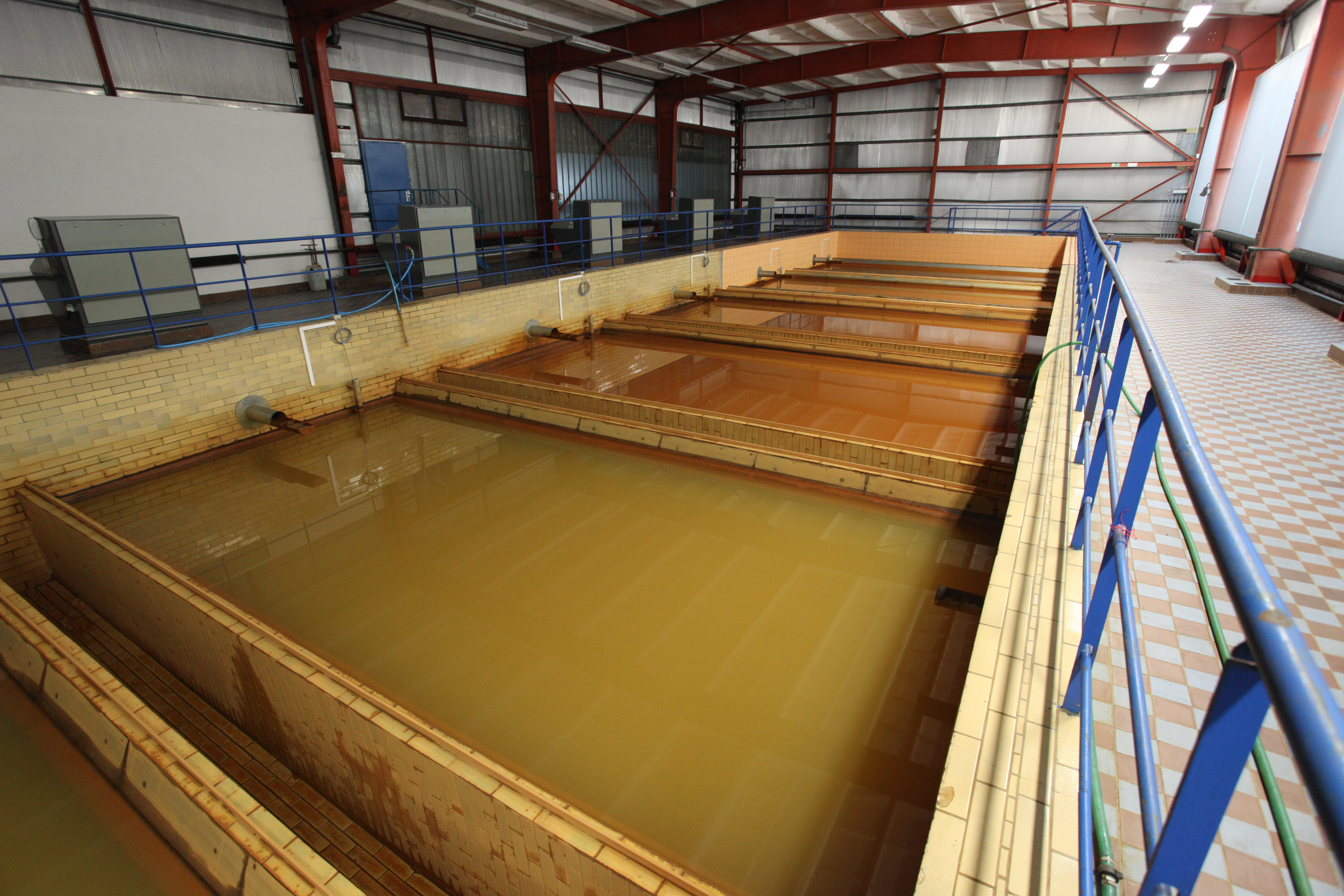
Tanks with sand filters to remove precipitated iron (not working at the time)

Different chemical procedures for the conversion into final products or the removal of pollutants are used for the safe disposal of contaminants.

- Pre-chlorination for algae control and arresting biological growth.
- Aeration along with pre-chlorination for removal of dissolved iron when present with relatively small amounts of manganese.
- Disinfection for killing bacteria, viruses and other pathogens, using chlorine, ozone and ultra-violet light.

=== Physical ===
Physical techniques of water/waste water treatment rely on physical phenomena to complete the removal process, rather than biological or chemical changes.

Common physical techniques are:

- Sedimentation is one of the most important main wastewater treatment procedures. Gravity settling is a method of separating particles from a fluid. The particle in suspension remains stable in quiescent conditions due to the decrease in water velocity throughout the water treatment process, following which the particles settle by gravitational force. For solids separation that is the removal of suspended solids trapped in the floc.
- Filtration is the technique of removing pollutants based on their particle size. Pollutant removal from waste water permits water to be reused for a variety of purposes. The types of filters used in the procedure differ depending on the contaminants present in the water. Particle filtration and Membrane filtration are the two main forms of waste water filtration.
- Dissolved air flotation (DAF) is a water treatment process that clarifies wastewaters (or other waters) by the removal of suspended matter such as oil or solids. The removal is achieved by dissolving air in the water or wastewater under pressure and then releasing the air at atmospheric pressure in a flotation tank basin. The released air forms tiny bubbles which adhere to the suspended matter, causing the suspended matter to float to the surface of the water where it may then be removed by a skimming device.
- Degasification is the process of removing dissolved gases from a solution. Henry's law states that the amount of dissolved gas in a liquid is proportionate to the partial pressure of the gas. Degasification is a low-cost method of removing carbon dioxide gas from waste water that raises the pH of the water by removing the gas.
- Deaerator is used to reduce oxygen and nitrogen in boiler feed water applications.

=== Physico-chemical ===
Also referred to as "Conventional" Treatment

- Coagulation for flocculation. The addition of coagulants destabilizes colloidal suspensions by neutralizing their charges, resulting in the aggregation of smaller particles during the coagulation process.
- Coagulant aids, also known as polyelectrolytes to improve coagulation and for more robust floc formation. Polyelectrolytes carry either a positive or negative charge. The nature of the polyelectrolyte used is purely based on the source water characteristics of the treatment plant.
- These will usually be used in conjunction with a primary coagulant such as ferric chloride, ferric sulfate, or alum.

Chemical precipitation is a common process used to reduce heavy metals concentrations in wastewater. The dissolved metal ions are transformed to an insoluble phase by a chemical interaction with a precipitant agent such as lime. In industrial applications stronger alkalis may be used to effect complete precipitation. In drinking water treatment, the common-ion effect is often used to help reduce water hardness.

Flotation uses bubble attachment to separate solids or dispersed liquids from a liquid phase.

==== Membrane filtration ====
Membrane filtration can remove suspended solids and organic components, and inorganic pollutants such heavy metals. For heavy metal removal, several forms of membrane filtration, such as ultrafiltration, nanofiltration, and reverse osmosis, can be used depending on the particle size that can be maintained. Antiscalants can help maintain membrane filtration. Some small molecules can permeate to some extent through membranes.

==== Ion exchange ====
Ion exchange is a reversible ion exchange process in which an insoluble substance (resin) takes ions from an electrolytic solution and releases additional ions of the same charge in a chemically comparable amount without changing the resin's structure.

==== Electrochemical treatment techniques ====
- Electrodialysis (ED)
- Membrane electrolysis (ME)
- Electrochemical precipitation (EP)

==== Adsorption ====
Adsorption is a mass transfer process in which a substance is transported from the liquid phase to the surface of a solid/liquid (adsorbent) and becomes physically and chemically bonded (adsorbate). Adsorption can be classified into two forms based on the type of attraction between the adsorbate and the adsorbent: physical and chemical adsorption, commonly known as physisorption and chemisorptions.

===== Activated carbon =====
Activated carbons (ACs) or biological-activated carbon (BAC) are effective adsorbents for a wide variety of contaminants. The adsorptive removal of color, aroma, taste, and other harmful organics and inorganics from drinking water and wastewater is one of their industrial applications.

Both a high surface area and a large pore size can improve the efficiency of activated carbon. Activated carbon was utilized by a number of studies to remove heavy metals and other types of contaminants from wastewater. The cost of activated carbon is rising due to a shortage of commercial activated carbon (AC). Because of its high surface area, porosity, and flexibility, activated carbon has a lot of potential in wastewater treatment.

=== Biological ===
This is the method by which dissolved and suspended organic chemical components are eliminated through biodegradation, in which an optimal amount of microorganism is given to re-enact the same natural self-purification process. Through two distinct biological process, such as biological oxidation and biosynthesis, microorganisms can degrade organic materials in wastewater. Microorganisms involved in wastewater treatment produce end products such as minerals, carbon dioxide, and ammonia during the biological oxidation process. The minerals (products) remained in the wastewater and were discharged with the effluent. Microorganisms use organic materials in wastewater to generate new microbial cells with dense biomass that is eliminated by sedimentation throughout the biosynthesis process.

== Standards ==
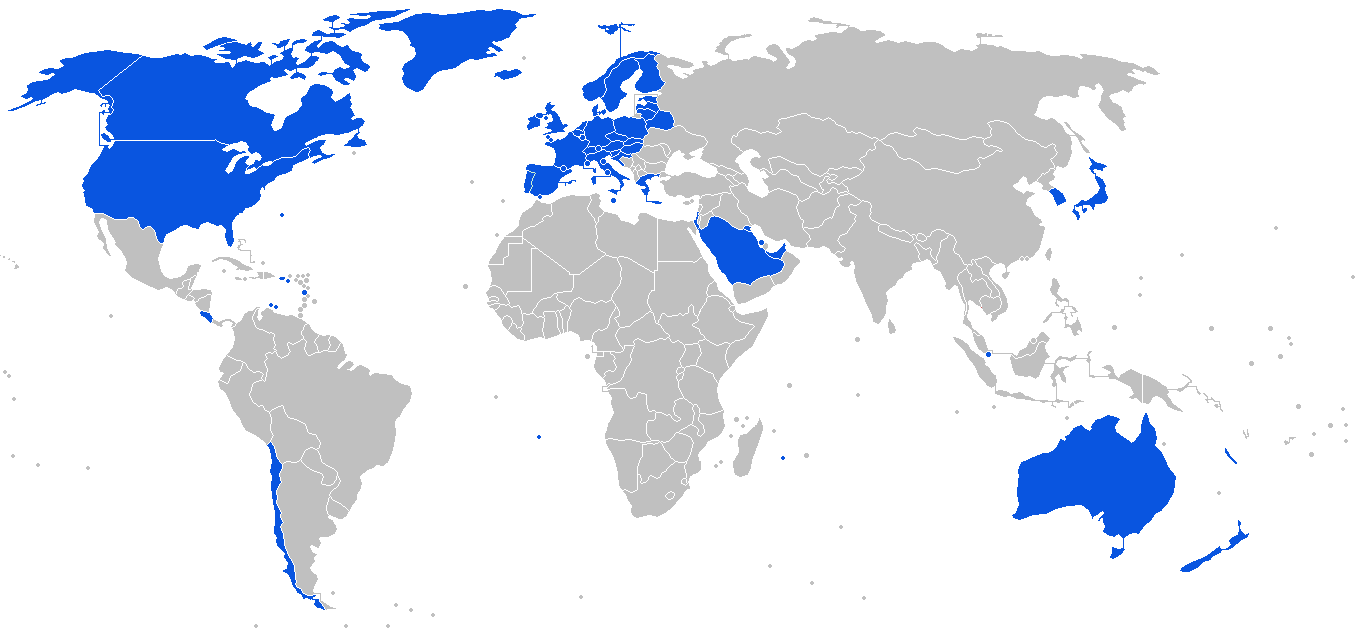
Countries where tap water is safe to drink (blue)

Many developed countries specify standards to be applied in their own country. In Europe, this includes the European Drinking Water Directive and in the United States the United States Environmental Protection Agency (EPA) establishes standards as required by the Safe Drinking Water Act. For countries without a legislative or administrative framework for such standards, the World Health Organization publishes guidelines on the standards that should be achieved. China adopted its own drinking water standard GB3838-2002 (Type II) enacted by Ministry of Environmental Protection in 2002.

Where drinking water quality standards do exist, most are expressed as guidelines or targets rather than requirements, and very few water standards have any legal basis or, are subject to enforcement. Two exceptions are the European Drinking Water Directive and the Safe Drinking Water Act in the United States, which require legal compliance with specific standards.

== Developing countries ==
Appropriate technology options in water treatment include both community-scale and household-scale point-of-use (POU) or self-supply designs. Such designs may employ solar water disinfection methods, using solar irradiation to inactivate harmful waterborne microorganisms directly, mainly by the UV-A component of the solar spectrum, or indirectly through the presence of an oxide photocatalyst, typically supported TiO_{2} in its anatase or rutile phases. Despite progress in SODIS technology, military surplus water treatment units like the ERDLator are still frequently used in developing countries. Newer military style Reverse Osmosis Water Purification Units (ROWPU) are portable, self-contained water treatment plants are becoming more available for public use.

For waterborne disease reduction to last, water treatment programs that research and development groups start in developing countries must be sustainable by the citizens of those countries. This can ensure the efficiency of such programs after the departure of the research team, as monitoring is difficult because of the remoteness of many locations.

Energy Consumption: Water treatment plants can be significant consumers of energy. In California, more than 4% of the state's electricity consumption goes towards transporting moderate quality water over long distances, treating that water to a high standard. In areas with high quality water sources which flow by gravity to the point of consumption, costs will be much lower. Much of the energy requirements are in pumping. Processes that avoid the need for pumping tend to have overall low energy demands. Those water treatment technologies that have very low energy requirements including trickling filters, slow sand filters, gravity aqueducts.

A 2021 study found that a large-scale water chlorination program in urban areas of Mexico massively reduced childhood diarrheal disease mortality rates.

== Materials ==
Stainless steels, such as Type 304L and 316L, are used extensively in the fabrication of water treatment plants due to their corrosion resistance to water and to the corrosivity of chlorination used for disinfection.

== See also ==
- Control of water pollution – Contamination of water bodies
- Clean Water Act – 1972 U.S. federal law regulating water pollution
- Peak water – Concept on the quality and availability of freshwater resources
- Pulsed-power water treatment – Using electro-magnetic fields on cooling water
- Solar water disinfection – Portable water purification powered by sunlight
- Raw water#Treatment – Untreated water found in a natural environment
- Water purification – Process of removing impurities from water
- Water quality – Assessment against standards for use
- Water softening – Removing positive ions from hard water
- Water supply – Provision of water by public utilities, commercial organisations or others
