= Knut Selberg =

Norwegian architect

Knut Atle Selberg (born 1949, in Norway) is a planner, architect, and urban designer with the Selberg Arkitektkontor AS since 1996.

Selberg received his BS in architecture in 1973, his diploma in architecture in 1975, and his Diploma in Urban Design in 1976 at Scot Sutherland School of Architecture at Garthdee School of Engineering, Aberdeen, Scotland.

Selberg Arkitektkontor is a multi-discipline company working in the fields of planning, landscaping, architecture, and analysis.

== Architectural Projects ==
- IKEA Store Leangen, Norway - the largest IKEA store in Norway at 25.000m2 (1996-2002)
- Lerkendal stadion for the Norwegian football club Rosenborg BK (1996-2002)

=== Traffic and road design ===
- E6 Project - Melhus Municipality, Sør-Trøndelag, Norway (1996-2003)
- Urban design and environmental plan for 2 main roads into Trondheim Municipality, Norway (1996-2003)
- Oslo Tunnel (1985-1990)

=== Bridges ===
- Leonardo Bridge in Ås Municipality, Norway - part of the Vebjørn Sand Da Vinci Project (1996-2001)
- Vallsundet Bridge in Östersund, Sweden - nominated to “The building of the year” in Sweden in 1999 (1995-1998)
- Askøy Bridge which connects Bergen Municipality to Askøy Municipality (1991-1996)
- Evenstad Bridge which spans the river Glomma (1993-1997)
