= Gordon Duthie =

Scottish alternative musician

Gordon Duthie (born 10 February 1987) is a Scottish alternative musician, singer-songwriter and multi-instrumentalist.

== Biography ==
Duthie began working on his debut album Shire and City in 2008 whilst studying towards an MSc in International Marketing Management at The Robert Gordon University in Aberdeen. Duthie wrote a Thesis and dissertation on the topic of music distribution during this period.

Duthie first came to public attention in December 2011 when his music video for Hide appeared on his YouTube channel. The video was inspired by Duthie's upbringing in Aberdeenshire and he also wanted to raise the profile of the landmarks featured.

Duthie released his debut album Shire and City in June 2012 which was met with favourable reviews, for example, New Reviews praised Duthie's talent, dedication and artistry concluding: "The variations across Shire and City do well to display Duthie’s phenomenal talent and the listener can’t help but appreciate his dedication and hard work. Anybody who loves music should check this album out straight away, from this fantastic and genuinely creative musician, something that sadly is sometimes lost in the money grabbing, image obsessed music industry today."

During the production of Shire and City Duthie commissioned an artwork piece which explored the urban myth that Bram Stoker used Slains Castle in Cruden Bay as an inspiration for Dracula.
