= Robert Gordon University =

Public university in Aberdeen, Scotland

Coordinates: 57.1480°N 2.1014°W

- Motto: Latin: Omni Nunc Arte Magistra
- Motto in English: Now by all your mastered arts
- Type: Public research university
- Established: 9 June 1992; 34 years ago (origins mid-18th century)
- Affiliations: EUA, University Alliance
- Endowment: £2.48 million (2022)
- Budget: £114.7 million (2021-22)
- Chancellor: Evelyn Glennie
- Principal: Steve Olivier
- Academic staff: 662
- Administrative staff: 933
- Students: 14,840 (2022/23)
- Undergraduates: 10,150 (2022/23)
- Postgraduates: 4,690 (2022/23)
- Location: Aberdeen, Scotland, United Kingdom
- Campus: Suburban
- Colours: Purple and White Historic Colours: Royal Blue, Red and Gold
- Website: www.rgu.ac.uk

Robert Gordon University, commonly called RGU (abbreviated Robt Gor. in post-nominals; Scottish Gaelic: Oilthigh Raibeart Ghòrdain), is a public research university in the city of Aberdeen, Scotland. It became a university in 1992, and originated from an educational institution founded in the 18th century by Robert Gordon, an Aberdeen merchant, and various institutions which provided adult and technical education in the 19th and early 20th centuries. It is one of two universities in the city, the other being the University of Aberdeen. RGU is a campus university in Garthdee, in the south-west of the city.

The university awards degrees in a wide range of disciplines from BA/BSc to PhD, primarily in professional, technical, health and artistic disciplines and those most applicable to business and industry. A number of traditional academic degree programmes are also offered, such as in the social sciences. In addition, the university's academic and research staff produce research in a number of areas.

== History ==
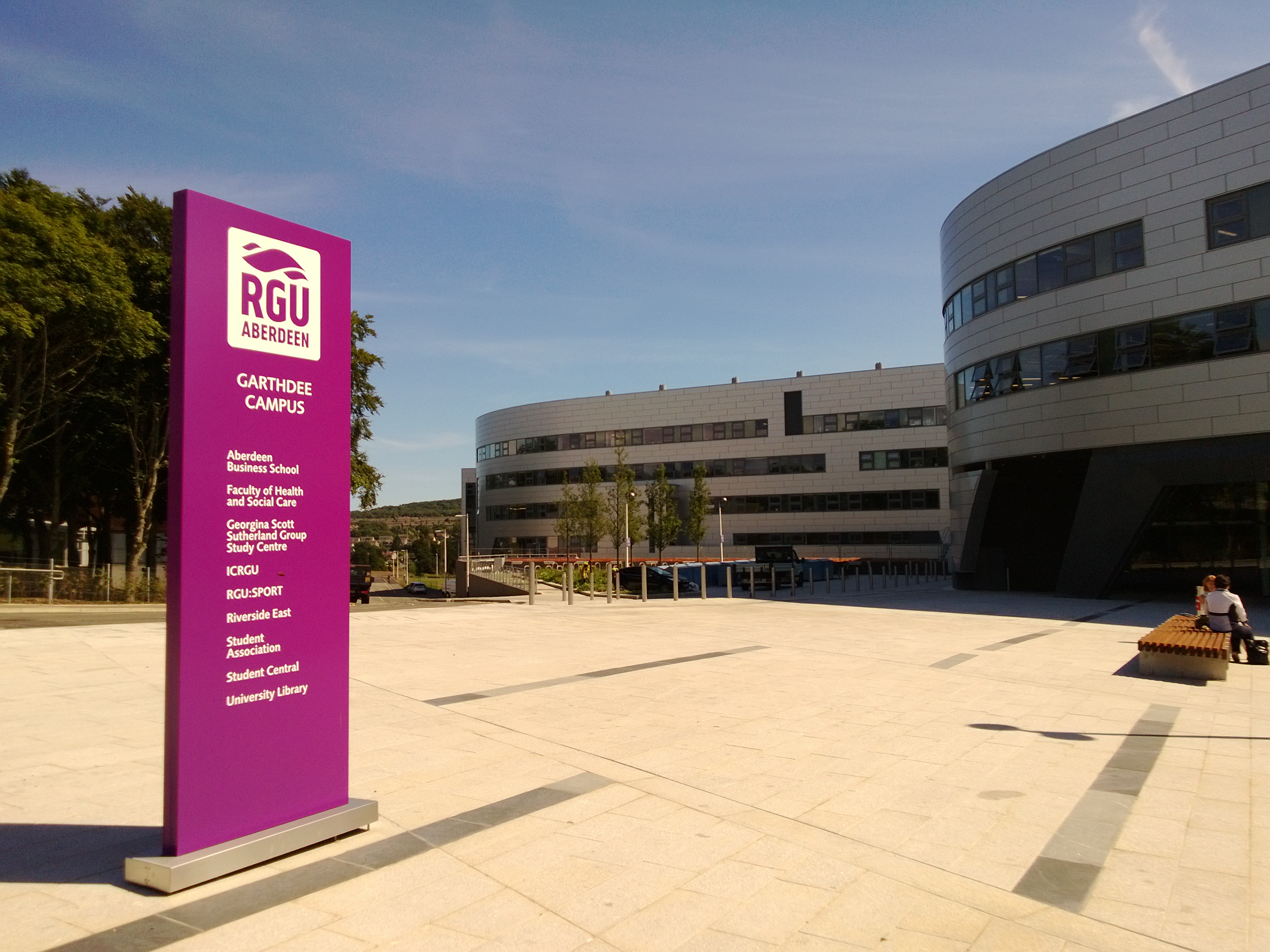
Main plaza at Garthdee campus (2013)

The university derives from Robert Gordon's Hospital, an institution set up in the mid-18th century to provide the poor with a basic education and reasonable start in life, and the various educational institutions which developed in Aberdeen to provide adults with technical, vocational and artistic training, mostly in the evenings and part-time. Following numerous mergers between these establishments, it became Robert Gordon's Technical College in 1910, then following further developments became Robert Gordon's Institute of Technology in 1965 and began to conduct increasing amounts of research and provide degree-level education. It became a university in 1992, and now mostly offering day classes to full-time students.

=== 1720s–1881: Founding institutions ===
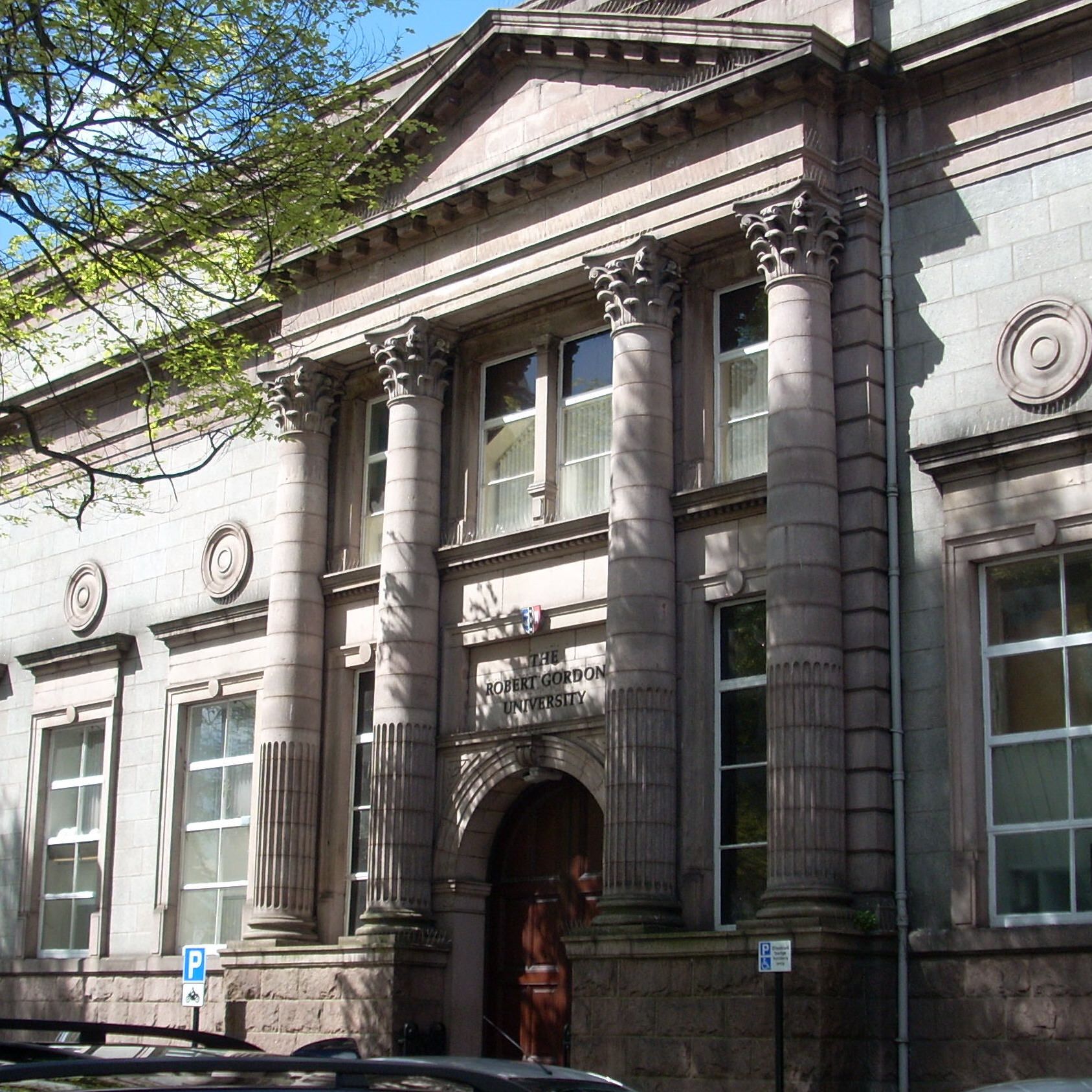
Administration Building on Schoolhill in Aberdeen city centre.

Robert Gordon was a Scottish merchant, who had grown up in Aberdeen and graduated from Marischal College. Following a successful career, he retired to Aberdeen around 1720 where he prepared plans for a Hospital similar to that founded in Edinburgh by George Heriot. Robert Gordon's Hospital, now Robert Gordon's College was established in 1750, almost two decades after Gordon's death.

In the early 19th century, the Industrial Revolution led to a greater need for scientific and technical education for working-class adults, with Mechanics' Institutes spreading through Scotland, patterned on that founded by George Birkbeck at Glasgow (he would later found Birkbeck College, the University of London's night school). The Aberdeen Mechanic's Institution opened in 1824 providing evening classes in subjects such as physics, chemistry, mathematics, book-keeping, maritime navigation and art. By 1855 it was receiving government funding as the School of Science and Art, with a Technical School founded two years later.

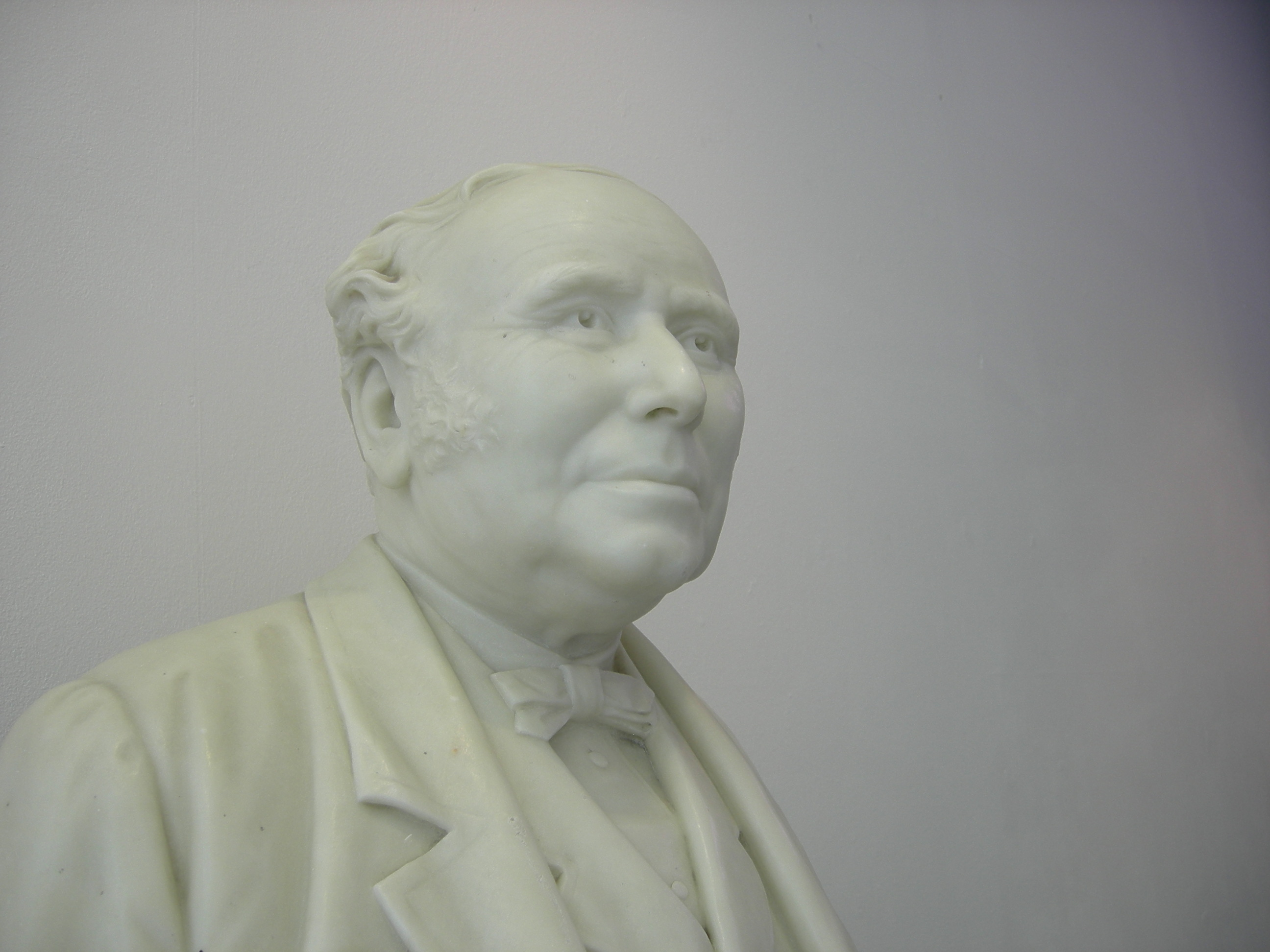
Bust of businessman John Gray, after whom Gray's School of Art is named

=== 1881–1910: Robert Gordon's College ===
Government education reforms in the 1870s saw the Hospital system fall out of favour and encouraged mergers with other educational establishments. As part of these reforms, the Aberdeen Mechanic's Institute and Technical School merged with Robert Gordon's Hospital in 1881. The resulting institution was known as Robert Gordon's College. It provided an education for boys but as a day school only, and evening and later coeducational day classes for adults in science, technology, commerce and general subjects. Art classes offered by the Mechanic's Institution were transferred to Gray's School of Art which opened in 1885.

=== 1910–1965: Robert Gordon's Technical College ===
By the end of the 19th century, Robert Gordon's College was a major provider of technical education, receiving large government grants. Following further reforms, in 1903 the adult education part of the college was designated a Central Institution along with Gray's School of Art (which had become a Central Institution two years earlier), allowing the adult education activities to develop independently rather than under the control of the local School Board. However, even this was not sufficient to meet demand for technical education, and dedicated Technical Colleges were being set up in other Scottish cities. As a result, in 1910 adult education activities were split from the school and became Robert Gordon's Technical College. Also merged into the new Technical College was the city's School of Domestic Economy which provided classes in domestic science. The day school for boys continued as Robert Gordon's College, and the two institutions shared a campus, buildings and until 1981, a Board of Governors and administrative staff.

During the 1920s, the first Ordinary and Higher Certificates and Diplomas were awarded, and by the 1930s Robert Gordon's Technical College was made up of Schools of Engineering, Chemistry, Maths & Physics, Pharmacy, Art (including architecture), Domestic Science, and Navigation. Around this time the first students began to be prepared for external degree examinations – for the University of Aberdeen's BSc in engineering. A system of student governance also developed, with a Student Representative Council formed in 1931. In the closing years of World War II, candidates started to be prepared to sit exams for external degrees of the University of London, in subjects such as Chemistry and Engineering, but only via part-time and/or evening classes. After 1945, to aid with settling large numbers of returning soldiers into a career, the Government backed a Business Training Scheme which allowed the Technical College to introduce courses in Business Administration.

=== 1965–1992: Robert Gordon's Institute of Technology ===
In 1955, the Technical College received a large area of land. The architect Tom Scott Sutherland, purchased Garthdee House in 1953 and subsequently donated it and the estate in 1955 for a new school of architecture. These classes had taken place at Gray's School of Art, but had been expanding in the 1940s and 1950s and much more space was needed. Following completion of an extension to the house, the new Scott Sutherland School of Architecture opened in 1957. In 1966, Gray's School of Art also moved to a new building on this estate with its Schoolhill building being repurposed for administrative use. By 2013, all activities had transferred to Garthdee, with the addition of land immediately adjacent purchased from Aberdeen City Council in the 1990s.

The 1963 Robbins Report on the future of UK higher education recommended major expansion, which led to the renaming of the institution to Robert Gordon's Institute of Technology to suggest its increasing role in higher education rather than further education. As well as new "plate-glass" universities, reforms following the report created the polytechnics in England, Wales and Northern Ireland. It also created the Council for National Academic Awards (CNAA) to allow non-university institutions (like the polytechnics and Scottish central institutions) to run programmes that graduated students with CNAA degrees. The institute's first CNAA degree programmes began in pharmacy in 1967, then in engineering, chemistry and physics in 1969, and expanded at undergraduate and postgraduate level to all disciplines. Around this time, the government also began to transfer non-degree teaching (e.g. certificate courses in navigation) to local-authority colleges.

During the 1960s, an academic committee structure was set up, headed from 1969 by an Academic Council. During the 1970s, these committees underwent expansion and reform to improve participation by academic staff in decision-making. For the first time, a faculty structure was introduced, with Faculties of Art & Architecture, Engineering, Arts, and Sciences, led by deans. A department dedicated to providing computer services to the institute was also established in 1974, and the first professorships were introduced in 1975. In 1981, the separation of the Board of Governors and administration staff from Robert Gordon's College was completed, although the school and Institute continued to share some buildings. Beginning in the 1970s, the institute also began to provide consultancy and training for the North Sea oil industry, particularly in engineering and offshore safety and survival.

=== 1992–present: The Robert Gordon University ===
Following the reforms of the Further and Higher Education Act 1992, the institute was awarded university status as The Robert Gordon University on 9 June 1992. The new university inherited numerous small campuses, and during the late 1990s and 2000s embarked on large building projects to consolidate teaching at its City Centre and Garthdee campuses, assisted by a large purchase of land at Garthdee from Aberdeen City Council in the mid-1990s. As new Garthee facilities were completed, the majority of these previous campuses were sold as land for housing development (such as at Kepplestone and King Street), while City Centre facilities that were no longer required were often sold to Robert Gordon's College, with the sale proceeds paying for the expansion and new construction at Garthdee. In the 1990s and 2000s student numbers also increased considerably, requiring new and larger facilities. A merger with the University of Aberdeen was discussed in 2002, but was rejected in favour of remaining separate but working in closer collaboration.

By 2000, the university had consolidated to two campuses, at Garthdee and a city centre campus at Schoolhill and St. Andrew Street in central Aberdeen. However, it had been planned since the early 1990s to eventually move all facilities to a single campus at Garthdee and additional land was purchased to enable buildings to be constructed to house academic departments which had been at the city centre campus. The first phase was completed in summer 2013 with the opening of the Sir Ian Wood building (formally opened in July 2015). As of August 2017, all academic and administrative departments are located at the Garthdee Campus, with the university retaining a space within the previous Administrative Building to host events and activities offering staff, students and alumni training and funding to develop business ideas.

In March 2024, the university announced a voluntary severance plan which included reorganising subjects such as digital marketing, journalism and hospitality. The vice-chancellor Steve Olivier stated that the downsizing was key to "maintain [the university's] long-term financial sustainability", citing lower numbers of foreign students and increased costs as budgetary challenges, with 130 employees ultimately departing. In November 2024, a further 135 redundancies were announced with the intention of moving some staff within the university. While Olivier called the redundancies a "last resort", Unison criticised the handling of the consultation, highlighting the perceived lack of transparency towards university staff and the consultation period covering Christmas and New Year. Liam Kerr, one of the MSPs for the North East Scotland electoral region, described the move as "a hammer blow to the future of our young people, our workforce and employers". In March 2025, the Educational Institute of Scotland voted for strike action in response to the redundancies, with its general secretary Andrea Bradley describing them as "alarming" and the cause of "a serious impact on learning and teaching across the university". Olivier called the strikes "disappointing", adding that the university had "done all that it can to mitigate against the potential of compulsory redundancies". The planned dates for industrial action were 15 April, 1 and 7 May, and 8-12 September.

=== Controversies ===
==== Donald Trump honorary degree ====
In 2010, RGU gained international attention for awarding an honorary degree to controversial American businessman and future United States President Donald Trump. This was featured in the 2012 documentary film You've Been Trumped which documented the progress of the construction of Trump's golf course near Aberdeen from the point of view of local residents. In the film Dr David Kennedy, former Principal of the university, is shown handing back his own honorary degree in protest at the university's action in awarding the degree to Trump.

In December 2015, the university's then Principal, Professor Ferdinand von Prondzynski, announced he was reviewing the honorary degree and expressed his alarm at statements made by Donald Trump. On 9 December 2015, the honorary degree was revoked. RGU publicly stated: "In the course of the current US election campaign (2016), Mr Trump has made a number of statements that are wholly incompatible with the ethos and values of the university. The university has therefore decided to revoke its award of the honorary degree". The revoking of Donald Trump's honorary doctorate came in excess of 4 years after the businessman accused the then-incumbent US President Barack Obama of illegitimacy on the basis of unsubstantiated accusations that Obama was born in Kenya and therefore not a US citizen.

==== Vice Principal appointment ====
In May 2018 an internal probe was launched after an anonymous whistleblower noted that RGU's newly appointed Vice-Principal for Commercial and Regional Innovation, Gordon McConnell, was co-director with Principal Ferdinand von Prondzynski in Knockdrin Estates Limited, a non-trading micro-company holding von Prondzynski's family castle and estate. Published on 4 July 2018, the investigation found that McConnell "did not declare in his declaration of interest form (completed in September 2017, following his appointment) that he was a director of Knockdrin Estates Limited" as well as revealing that this form was co-signed by von Prondzynski as his line manager. The inquiry found that whilst the Principal failed to declare this link at the time of Gordon McConnell's appointment, it also expressed the view of the board that he did not deliberately conceal any information.

The finding led to a letter of resignation from another of the three Vice-Principals, Paul Hagan, who condemned RGU for failing to punish the pair, stating that this damaged the institution. Hagan later withdrew his resignation in response to Prondzynski's departure.

On 9 August 2018, von Prondzynski announced that he would voluntarily step down from his post on 31 August. In the same press release, RGU announced that Deputy Principal John Harper had already been appointed to succeed Prondzynski.

== Campus ==
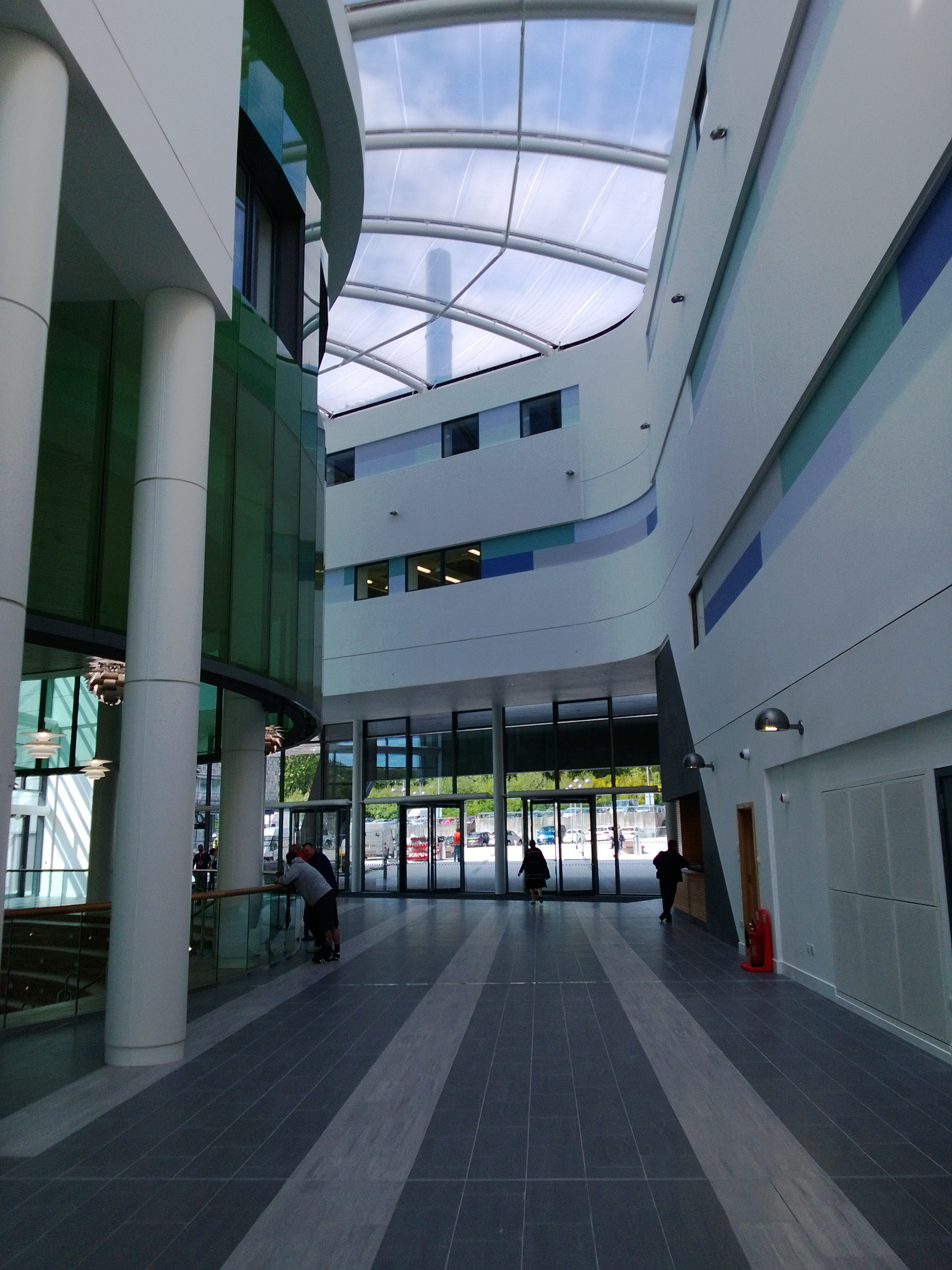
Atrium of Sir Ian Wood Building at Garthdee campus.

RGU operates a single campus in Garthdee, Aberdeen. For much of its history it was a greenfield site, with parts used as the gardens and estate of the Victorian manor of Garthdee House, farmland, and open meadows. The first university buildings were in use from the 1950s. The Garthdee campus has seen more development in recent years, with new buildings constructed since the late 1990s.

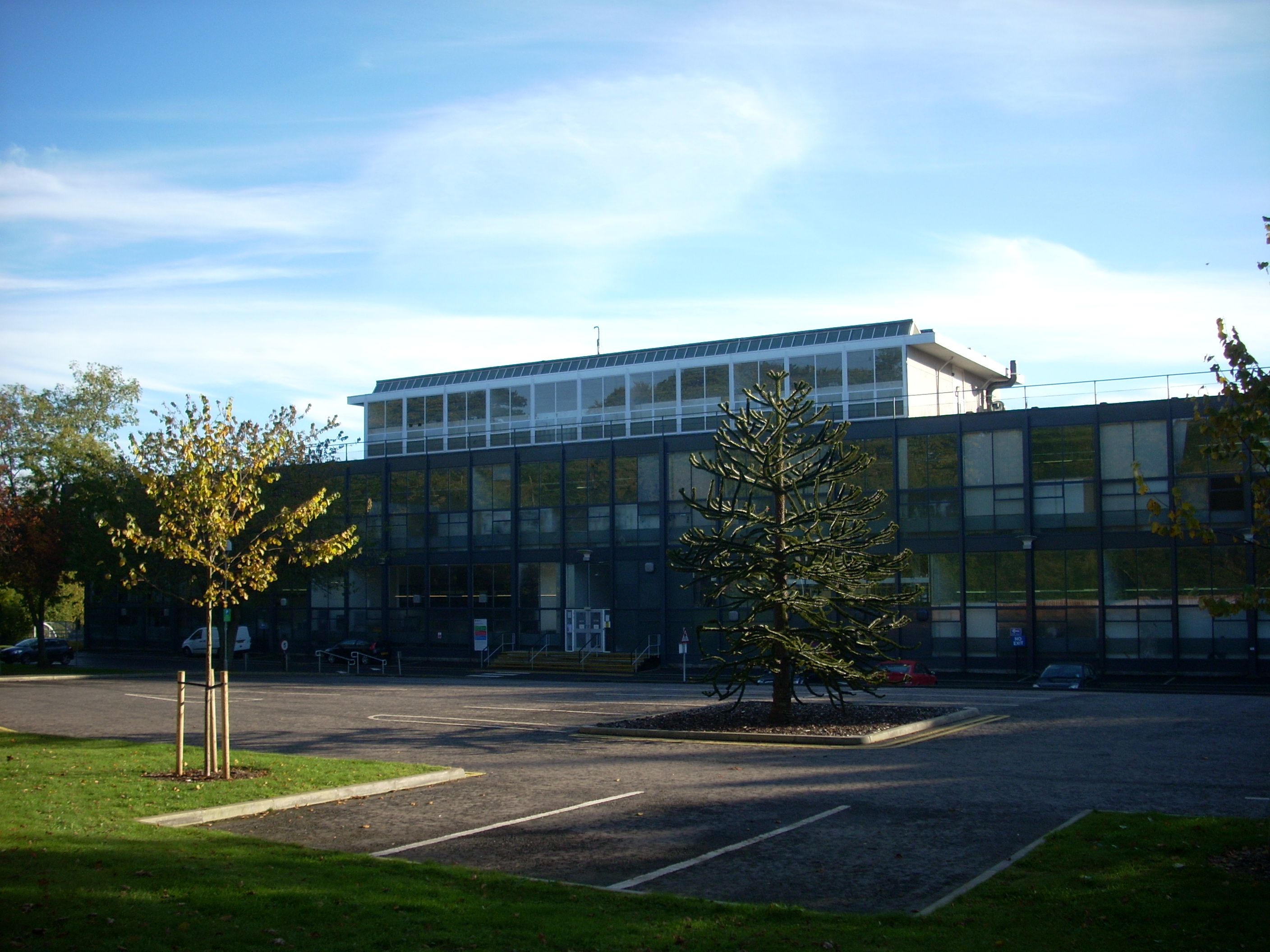
Gray's School of Art building

The campus extends to 23 hectares (57 acres), although some of this is currently landscaped parkland, undeveloped, or under construction. In addition, the university owns a further 8 hectares (20 acres) of land to the west (primarily woodland) and 22 hectares (54 acres) at Waterside Farm on the opposite bank of the River Dee.

=== Former city centre facilities ===
Until 2017 the university continued to operate one non-academic facility in the city-centre. The building at Schoolhill is situated next to the Aberdeen Art Gallery and Robert Gordon's College, a private school which is no longer affiliated to the university but shares a common heritage and motto. The Administration Building is a listed building, constructed from granite like many buildings in Aberdeen.

Also located there was the old city centre campus. Many of these buildings were sold over the years to Robert Gordon's College for school use, while others have been sold for redevelopment. In July 2014, the St. Andrew Street building (which had been replaced by the Sir Ian Wood building at the Garthdee campus) was sold to the Canadian hotel Sandman Hotels group to be converted to a four-star hotel. The 12,000 square metre building was constructed around 1908 and had served as the Aberdeen College of Education until purchased in 1968; the university claimed it to be the third-largest granite building in Europe, after the Spanish Escorial palace near Madrid, and Marischal College.

==== Administration building ====
The former Administration Building is located on Schoolhill. It initially housed Gray's School of Art and was designed by the Aberdeen architect Alexander Marshall Mackenzie.

As the school grew in size, the building was extended in 1896 and again between 1928 and 1931. However, it eventually became too small and when the school moved to a new building at Garthdee in the 1960s, the building was converted for administrative use. From then until 2013 it housed the Principal's office, which moved to Garthdee House at the Garthdee campus, followed by the administrative staff in 2017.

In 2019, the Administration building was redeveloped with Robert Gordon University retaining part of the building to host events and activities.

== Organisation and governance ==
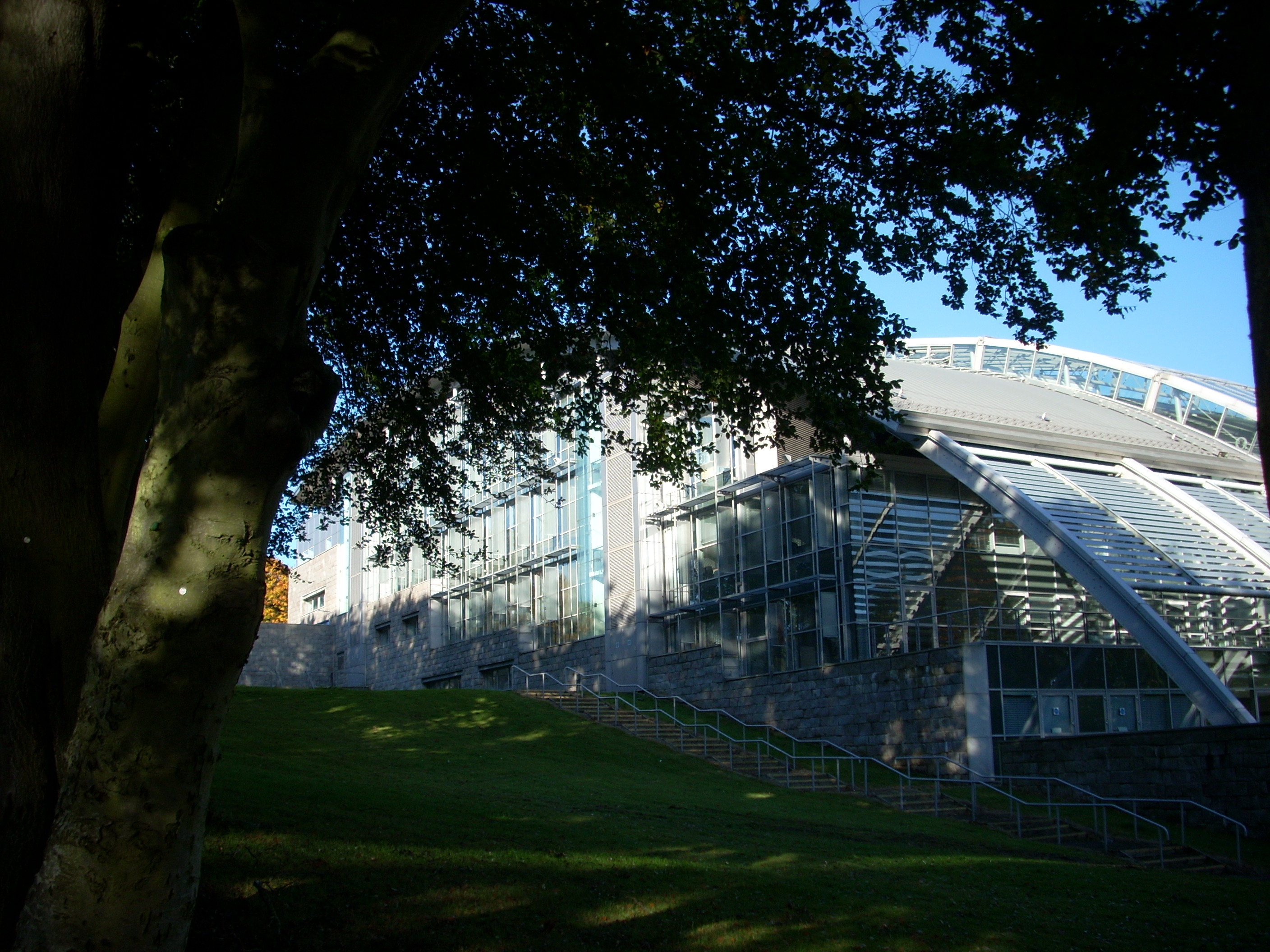
Side elevation of Faculty of Health and Social Care building.

=== Academic faculties ===
Academic activities at the university are divided into 11 schools. Each school is led by a head of school and is sub-divided into departments. There are also numerous administrative departments which support the university's activities. All academic Schools and Departments are based at the main Garthdee campus.

- Aberdeen Business School
- School of Applied Social Studies
- School of Computing
- School of Creative and Cultural Business
- School of Engineering
- Gray's School of Art
- School of Health Sciences
- The Law School
- School of Nursing, Midwifery and Paramedic Practice
- School of Pharmacy and Life Sciences
- The Scott Sutherland School of Architecture & Built Environment

=== Governance ===
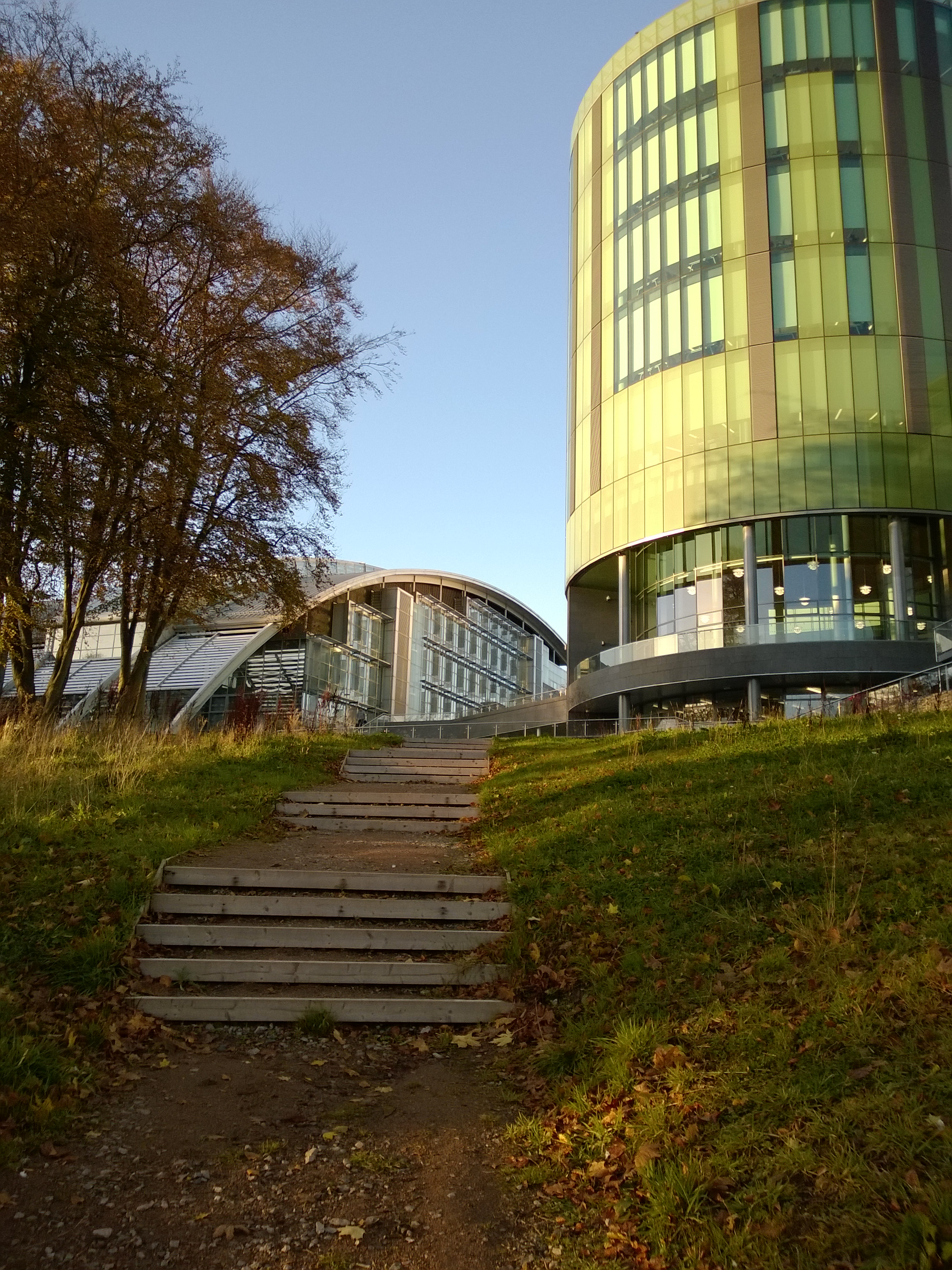
Library tower (right) and riverbank path. Faculty of Health and Social Care building also visible.

Under the terms of the Further and Higher Education (Scotland) Act 1992 and The Robert Gordon University (Scotland) Order of Council 1993, the university's governing body comprises a Board of Governors, consisting of 23 governors appointed to exercise the functions of management and control. The official head of the university is the Chancellor, although in practice they act mainly in a ceremonial or symbolic role. At an operational level, most of the day-to-day management and control of the institution is delegated to the Principal and Vice Chancellor (commonly known simply as the Principal). The Board of Governors also delegates functions relating to the overall planning, co-ordination, development and supervision of academic affairs to the university's Academic Council. Both the Board of Governors and the Academic Council are supported by a wide range of committees.

Chancellors

- Sir Bob Reid (1992–2005)
- Sir Ian Wood KT (2005–2021)
- Dame Evelyn Glennie CH (2021–present)

At Scottish universities, the Principal of the university is its general chief executive and is the administrative head of the institution, second in precedence only to the Chancellor. This means that the day-to-day running and leadership of the university is the responsibility of the Principal.

Principal and Vice-Chancellors

- David A. Kennedy (1992–1997)
- William Stevely CBE (1997–2005)
- R. Michael Pittilo MBE (2005–2010)
- John Harper (acting) (2010–2011)
- Ferdinand von Prondzynski (2011–2018)
- John Harper (2018–2020)
- Steve Olivier (2020–present)

== Academic profile ==
=== Reputation and rankings ===
Rankings
National rankings
- Complete (2027): 75
- Guardian (2027): 94
- Times / Sunday Times (2027): 55

Global rankings
- QS (2027): 1001–1200
- THE (2026): 801–1000

In the subject league tables from The Guardian, it was first in Scotland for four subjects in 2017 (Health Professions; Journalism; Architecture; and Pharmacy), while securing three subjects in the UK top 10.

The Sunday Times awarded RGU the title of Best Modern University in the UK for 2012 in its University Guide 2012. The title had previously been won by Oxford Brookes University for each of the preceding ten years. RGU received the 2012 award partly due to ratings of the quality of teaching and research, but also due to its employment record which was judged the best of any UK university. RGU was also named as Best Modern University in the UK in The Times Good University Guide 2013.

=== International collaboration ===
The university is an active member of the University of the Arctic. UArctic is an international cooperative network based in the Circumpolar Arctic region, consisting of more than 200 universities, colleges, and other organizations with an interest in promoting education and research in the Arctic region.

The university also participates in UArctic's mobility program north2north. The aim of that program is to enable students of member institutions to study in different parts of the North.

== Symbols and identity ==
The RGU logo (2013-present)

The university's logo and corporate identity make frequent use of the colour purple and the "Gordon" font, all of which appear extensively on campus signage, printed material and online. The current logo was unveiled in February 2013. From 2009 to 2013, the logo consisted of a roundel derived from the university's coat of arms.

Most universities in the UK are designated by order of the Privy Council; unusually for a university named after an individual, according to Robert Gordon University (Scotland) Order of Council 1993 the official name of the university includes the prefix "The" (as with George Washington University, Ohio State University and the College of William & Mary). However, current university branding typically leaves it out although it is still used for graduation.

=== Coat of Arms ===
Coat of arms of Robert Gordon University

The coat of arms derives from the one issued by the Lord Lyon King of Arms (the state official responsible for heraldry in Scotland) to Robert Gordon's Institute of Technology in 1982, which in turn derives from that first used in 1881 by the governors of Robert Gordon's Hospital when it became Robert Gordon's College. The arms consist of a shield only and are used infrequently, usually at formal occasions such as graduation, and can also be seen over the main entrance to the university's Administration Building at Schoolhill and various academic buildings at the main campus at Garthdee. The shield also formed the previous logo which still features on some older signage.

On the left side of the arms, the three boars on a blue background edged in gold are taken from the arms of the Gordon family, while on the right the castle on a red background is taken from the arms of the City of Aberdeen. This symbol of the city is shared with the arms of the University of Aberdeen. A black wavy band divides the two sides, and features heraldic symbols in gold representing technology (a mechanical cog), learning (a flaming torch) and commerce (a gold coin).

=== Motto ===
The university's motto is Omni Nunc Arte Magistra, which translates literally from Latin as "Now by all your mastered arts...", as if to suggest making use in everyday life of knowledge and skills gained. It is sometimes translated as "Make the best of all your abilities", although this is a somewhat more liberal rendering of the Latin. It comes from Virgil's Aeneid, Book VIII, line 441, as the god Vulcan encourages his workers at the forge. It shares this motto with Robert Gordon's College, who use it more frequently. Unlike some universities, the motto is not seen frequently, although it has appeared in graduation materials and is engraved on the shaft of the university's ceremonial mace.

=== Tartan ===
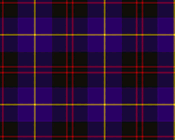
Robert Gordon University's official tartan

Like most Scottish universities, RGU has its own tartan; it mirrors the university's official colours of Royal Blue, Red and Gold which appear on the coat of arms (although the purple brand is now the recognised face of the university). The tartan was designed by Michael King in 1997. Some students on their graduation day choose to wear a tartan kilt.

=== Academic dress ===
Academic dress is normally only worn at graduation ceremonies and occasionally at other very formal events. In common with most British universities, graduands begin the ceremony wearing the dress of the degree to which they are being admitted except for the hood. For all bachelor's degrees (e.g. BA, BSc, etc.) and integrated Masters (e.g. MPharm, MEng etc.) a black gown is worn, ending 12 inches (30 cm) from the ground. For all other master's degrees except MPhil (e.g. MSc, MBA), a black gown is worn, ending 8 inches (20 cm) from the ground, while for MPhil the gown is the same but also has facings of white silk 2.5 inches (6.4 cm) in width. For Doctoral degrees (e.g. PhD), the Doctor's black robe (a black Panama gown) is worn; the Doctor's robe has front edges and sleeves in white silk. The Chancellor's robe is of black silk with front edges and fringes of pale gold, while the Principal/Vice-Chancellor's gown is the same but with front edges and fringes in white. For higher doctorates (including honorary doctorate), the robe is scarlet with white front edges.

All hoods are black and white and do not vary in colour by academic discipline, and all are of Cambridge shape. The hood is only put on after the degree has been awarded. For all bachelor's degrees, the hood is black, partially lined with white silk embossed with symbols from the university's coat of arms (the castle, torch, and mechanical cog) and has a black square backpiece (known as the "cape"). For master's degrees, the hood is black and fully lined and edged in white silk embossed with the same symbols from the coat of arms, and the cape also edged in white silk 0.5 inches (1.3 cm) in width. For Doctoral degrees the hood is as for master's degrees but with a 1-inch (2.5 cm) band of white silk around the cape, while for higher doctorates and honorary doctorates the hood is scarlet and lined with white silk. For all bachelor's and master's degrees, headdress is a plain black mortarboard while for Doctoral degrees, headdress consists of a black Tudor bonnet with white cord and tassels. Recipients of higher doctorates and honorary doctorates wear the same bonnet but with gold cord and tassels.

== Student life ==
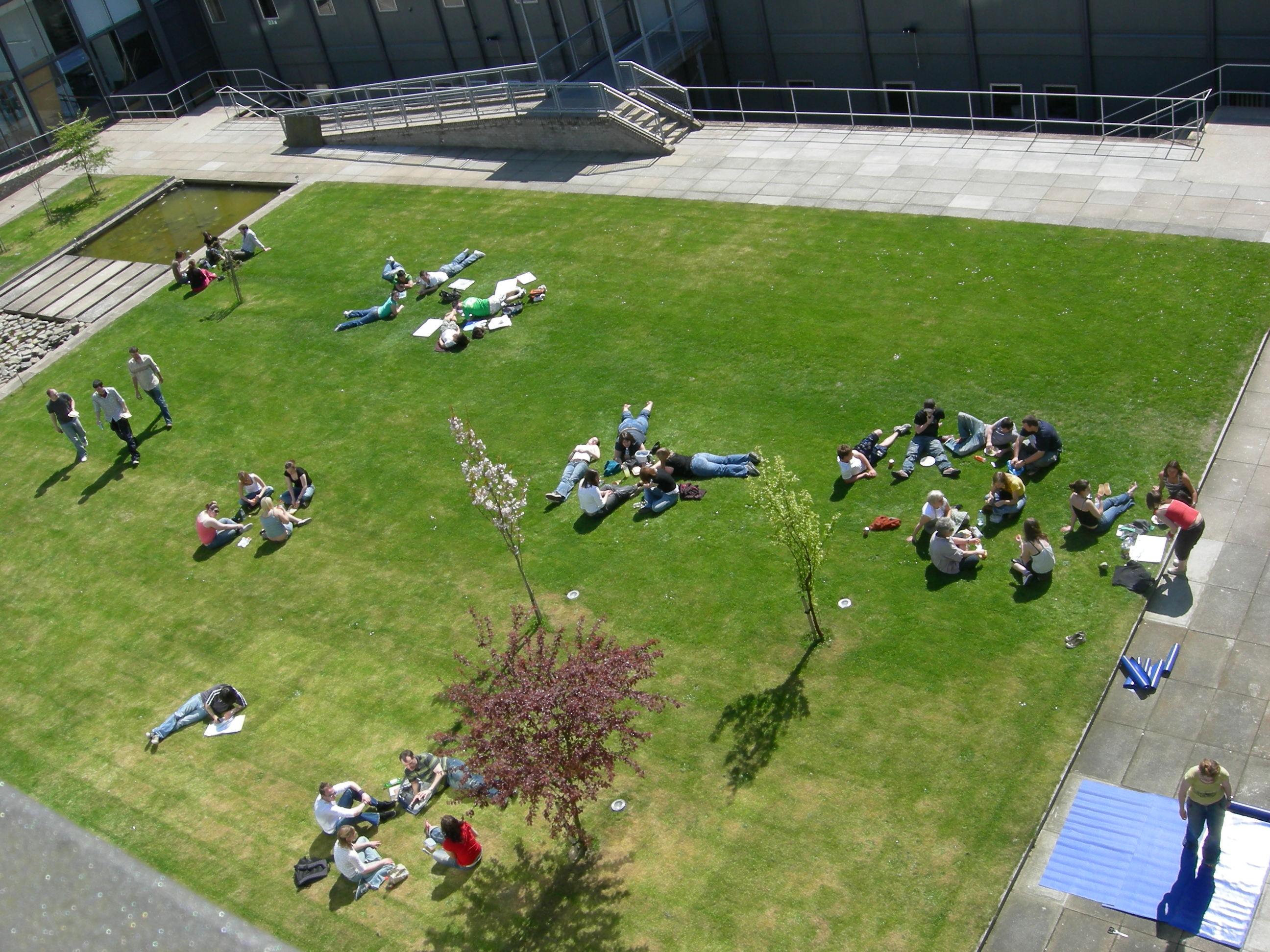
The quadrangle at Gray's School of Art, Garthdee campus

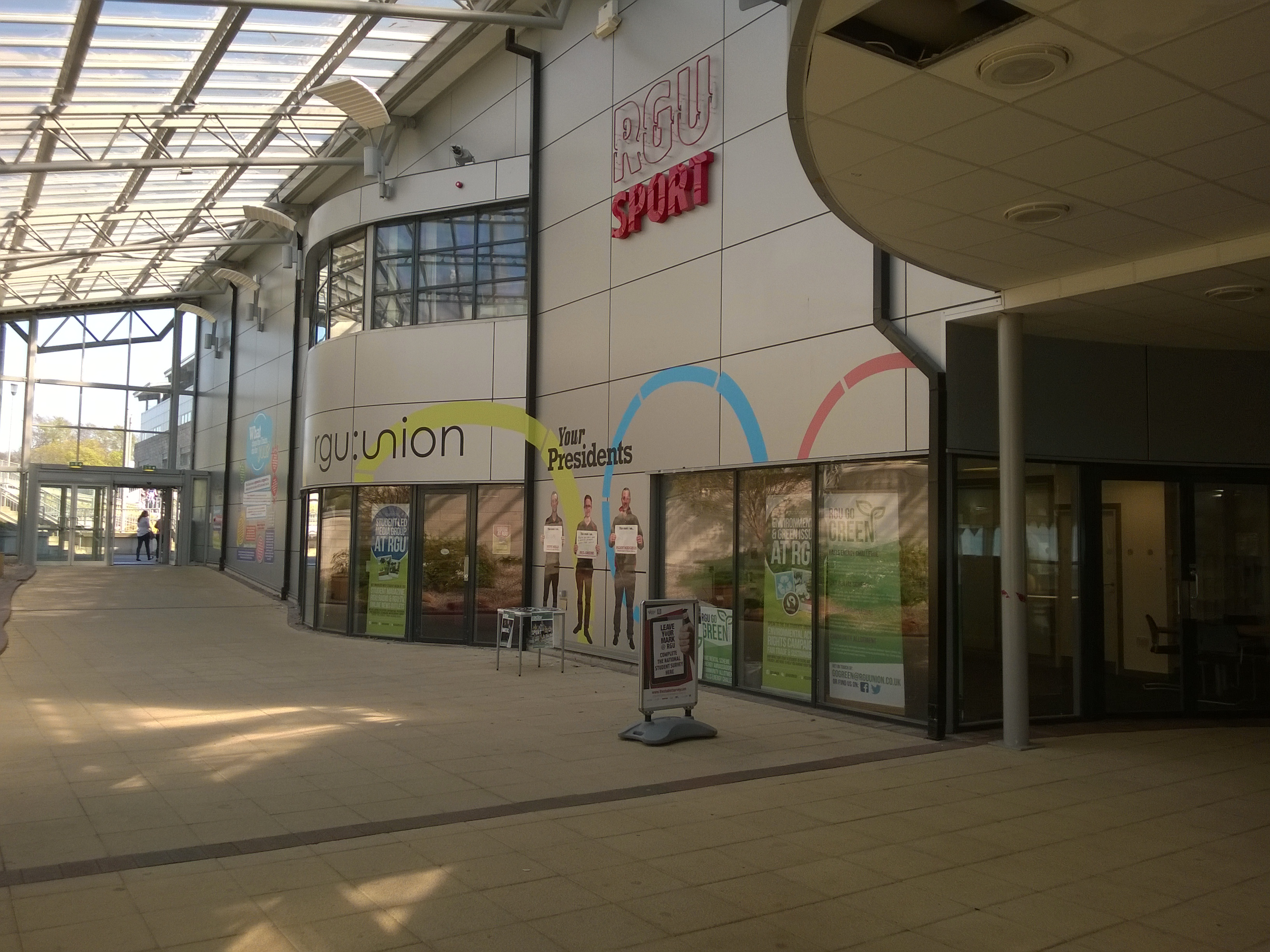
The RGU Student Union offices are located in the RGU Sport building

In 2023/2024 there were 18,000 students studying on campus and online.

As well as full-time and part-time on-campus study, the university provides a range of distance learning facilities over the internet via its virtual learning environment, CampusMoodle.

=== Student Association ===
The first Student Representative Council was organised at Robert Gordon's Technical College in 1931, with activities such as sports clubs and societies following in the 1940s. A Student Union building opening in 1952 at Rubislaw Terrace in the city's West End. In 1969, the shop and bakery next to Gray's School of Art (now the ONE Tech Hub) on Schoolhill came on the market and were purchased by Robert Gordon's Institute of Technology. The Student Union building opened there in 1974 and remained until its closure in July 2014 as the campus relocated to Garthdee. RGU:Union moved to Union Way by RGU Sport, and as of 2021 is now located within the Riverside Building.

=== Student media ===
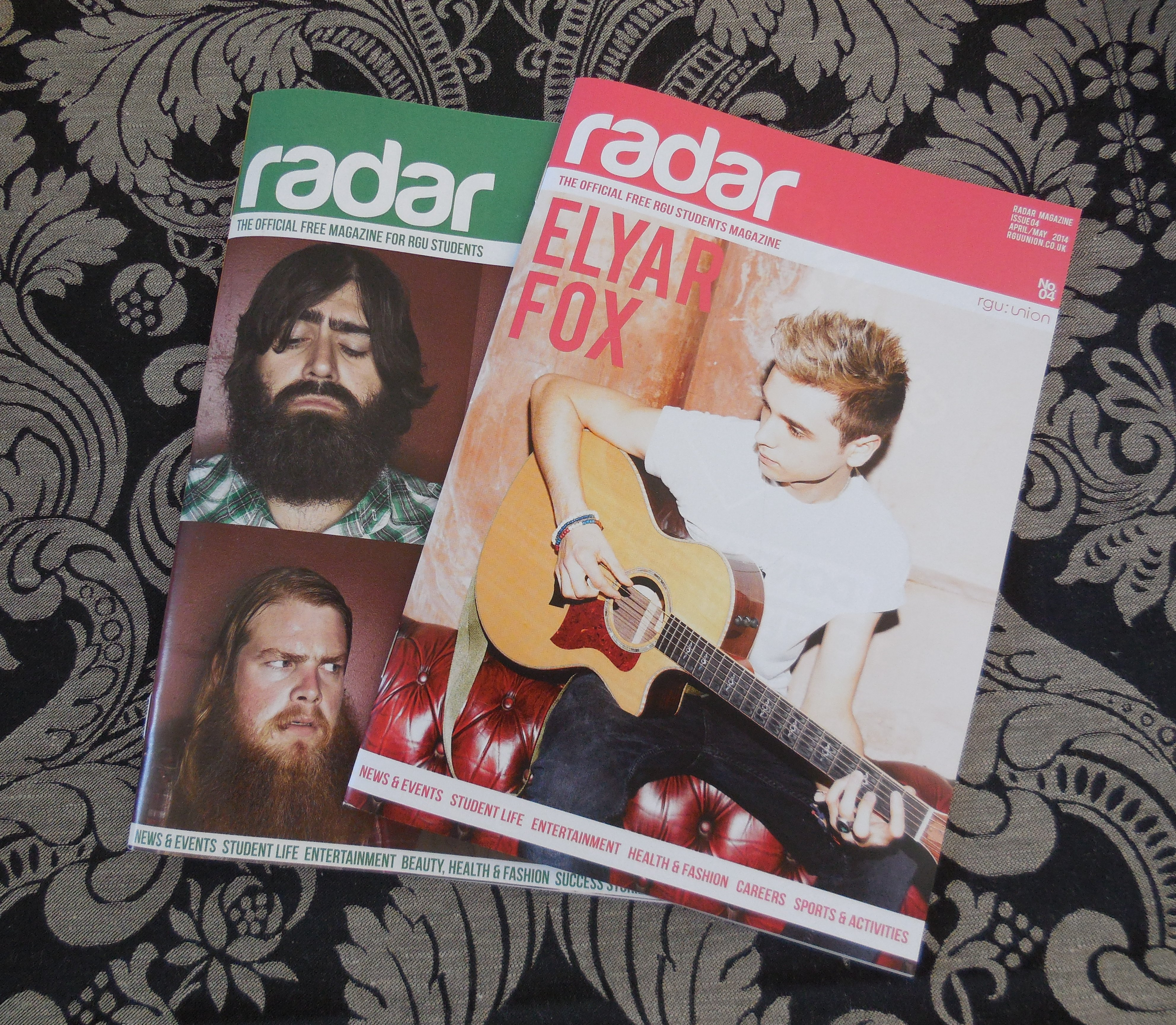
Copies of Radar, RGU's student magazine.

RGU:Union operates a student media program with RGU:Radio, RGU:TV and Radar Magazine. The student radio station, called RGU:Radio broadcasts live from a studio on campus, running a number of shows from music to current affairs. Broadcasts are streamed and regular podcasts are posted online.

RGU:TV produces regular videos about campus events, topical issues and student life and distributed them online through a YouTube channel.

Radar Magazine is a full-colour printed publication which is published three or four times each year. It features articles written by students covering campus events, student life, music, news, reviews, entertainment, fashion, sport and more. The magazine also has an online website where articles are posted regularly by students.

=== Accommodation ===
The university's Accommodation Services department arranges for students to be placed in one of nine halls of residence across the city.

By far the largest of the halls of residence are the Woolmanhill Flats at St. Andrew Street. The Woolmanhill flats have over 700 one-person bedrooms, arranged in self-catering flats of up to eight. The Woolmanhill Flats development was constructed in stages in the late 1980s and early 1990s by the university working in collaboration with a private developer. The newest hall of residence is the Crathie Student Village on Holburn Street, and houses approximately 100 students.

Other halls of residence include two buildings on the Garthdee Campus; the Square Tower and the Round Tower. These distinctive pink buildings were constructed in the early 1990s and inspired by traditional Scottish tower houses. They have received architectural acclaim by critics and are included in Prospect magazine's list of the 100 best Scottish modern buildings. When the list was published in 2005, the Round and Square Towers were the only buildings in Aberdeen to be included. A number of other halls of residence across the city are used, some operated in-house by RGU and others by private companies. These include Rosemount Halls, St. Peter's Halls and Linksfield Halls which were constructed by the University of Aberdeen and then privatised in the early 2000s. Students also have access to the private halls of residence in Aberdeen which are operated on a commercial basis by specialist companies, such as those owned and operated by the Unite Group.

=== Sports ===
RGU SPORT at the Garthdee campus provides a wide range of sport and fitness facilities to the university community as well as to the general public. Facilities include a 25m pool, various gyms with extensive facilities for cardiovascular training and resistance training (including free weights), a large sports hall (also used for exams), climbing wall, numerous fitness classes, physiotherapy, podiatry and sports massage. Students can obtain a gym membership free of charge and staff and graduates of the university receive a discount on use of these facilities.

There are over 32 campus sports clubs run by RGU:Union, and the university competes in Scottish Student Sport (SSS) and British Universities and Colleges Sport (BUCS) competitions.

Swimmer Hannah Miley studied at RGU until 2013 and appeared in publicity for the university. A sport scholar program provides support for the athletic and academic careers of developing and elite athletes, including coaching, access to training facilities and financial assistance, as well as flexibility in fitting training around the academic timetable.

The Robert Gordon University Boat Club contests the annual Aberdeen Universities Boat Race each Spring against the University of Aberdeen. RGU were victorious in 2012 2013, 2014, 2015. and 2016.

The two universities also compete annually in the Granite City Challenge which sees teams across a range of sports compete to be the best in the city.

== Notable alumni ==
- Gordon Duthie (born 1987), musician, singer/songwriter
- Ola Gorie, jewellery designer
- Maxwell Hutchinson, architect and broadcaster, guitarist with Lene Lovich
- Douglas Lumsden (born 1971), Scottish politician
- Eilidh Middleton, equestrian competitor
- Hannah Miley, swimmer and Olympian
- Callum Innes, Turner Prize-nominated artist
- Titi Horsfall, author
- Alan J. Jamieson, marine biologist

== Notable staff ==
- Seaton Baxter (born 1939), emeritus professor
- Susan Crowther, professor of midwifery
- Linda Lawton, researcher and professor of Environmental Biology
- Wolfram Meier-Augenstein (born 1959), emeritus professor
- Gordon Rawclffe (1910 – 1979), former departmental head of Electrical Engineering
- Joan Stringer (born 1948), political scientist, lecturer in public administration, and vice principal (1991-1996)
- Tim Wheeler (born 1950), former lecturer and head of School of Social Studies

== See also ==
- Armorial of UK universities
- List of universities in the United Kingdom
- Universities in Scotland
