= Thomas Scott Sutherland =

Scottish architect, businessman and councillor

- Born: 13 January 1899; Torry, Aberdeen
- Died: 13 June 1963 (aged 64); Aberdeen
- Spouses: Edith Iris Webber (m. 1929; div. 1941); Georgina Buchanan (m. 1950)

Thomas Scott Sutherland, known commonly as Tommy Scott Sutherland, or simply Scott Sutherland (13 January 1899 – 13 June 1963) was an architect, city councillor in Aberdeen, and entrepreneur. In the 1950s he gifted Garthdee House to the Gray's School of Architecture at Robert Gordon's College, later the Robert Gordon University. The former was renamed the Scott Sutherland School of Architecture.

== Early life ==
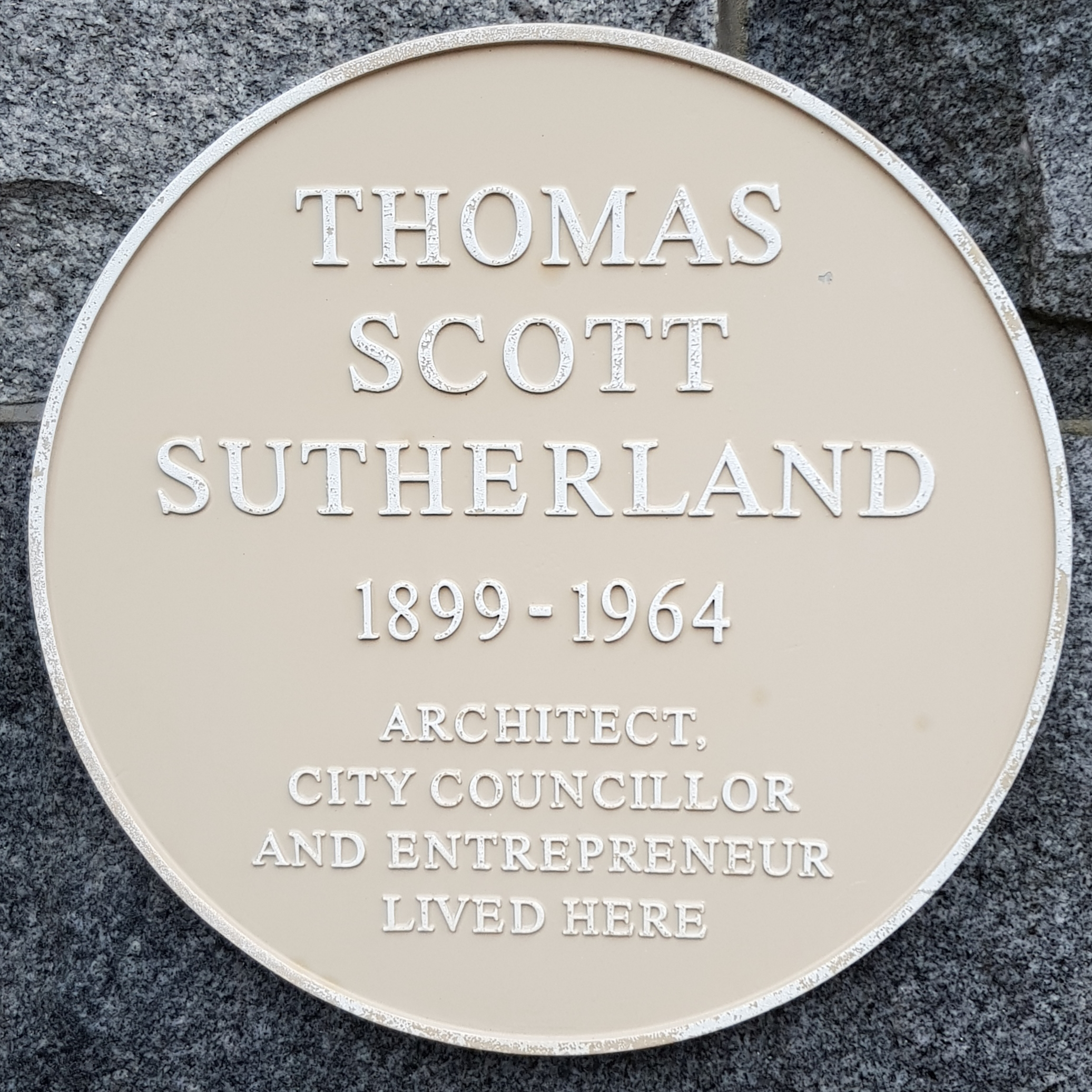
Commemorative Plaque to Scott Sutherland

Scott Sutherland was born on 13 January 1899 in Torry. His father, Robert William Sutherland, was a trawl fisherman, and his mother was Annie Hutchinson Scott. He had his leg amputated at the age of seven as a result of childhood osteomyelitis.

== Career ==
While Scott Sutherland's principal career was as an architect, he held other positions too.

=== Architecture ===
Scott Sutherland studied at the School of Architecture, Robert Gordon's College from 1916. He entered the office of John Alexander Ogg Allan in 1918. He qualified with a diploma in 1921 and was awarded a post-diploma in June 1923. Immediately afterwards he began his own practice in partnership with civil engineer I D McAndrew at 13 Bridge Street, Aberdeen.

He passed the qualifying exam in London in October 1923 and was admitted ARIBA on 3 March 1924. He and McAndrew dissolved the partnership that same year, and Sutherland continued in business on his own account at the same address.

Between 1927 and 1933 Sutherland was in partnership as T Scott Sutherland & Taylor, at 9 The Square, Huntly. Apparently at the same time he continued his own separate practice in Aberdeen, with both home and office at 10 Albyn Place. In 1930 he was admitted FRIBA. He was also a member of the council of the Aberdeen Society of Architects. He had been appointed architect to the County Education Authority (District 5) in 1927 where he had been responsible for 22 schools, as well designing as some 250 private houses.

During his career, Scott Sutherland specialised in cinema and house design. He was the architect of Aberdeen's Regent Cinema, opened in February 1932; the City Cinema, George Street, Aberdeen opened November 1933; the Victoria Cinema, Inverurie, opened in October 1934.; the Astoria Cinema, Kittybrewster, Aberdeen, opened December 1934; the Majestic Cinema, Union Street, Aberdeen (which Scott Sutherland described in his biography, Life on One Leg, as his finest design) and which opened in December 1936.

=== Other business interests ===
Prior to 1933 his office also was home to the Aberdeen branch of Scottish Amicable Building Society. Then he bought and demolished 250 and 252 Union Street for the sum of £1,400, and built on the site Amicable House, costing £16,000, in the Art Deco style. He based his new offices in the building which was now owned by the Building Society. As he became more successful Scott Sutherland was able to invest in fledgling businesses and ultimately was a director of about forty companies in and around Aberdeen. Notably amongst these he was a founder of the Caledonian Associated Cinemas. He was chairman of James Allan & Company. He was a director of Modern Homes Ltd. The houses which they developed were sold from his office. His boast was that he had sold three such houses in just twenty minutes. Over his lifetime, the businesses in which he had an interest ranged from orthopaedic footwear, miniature golf, furniture, retail, pharmaceutical manufacturing, hotels, whisky distillery and cinemas and theatres.

=== City Councillor ===
At the Aberdeen Town Council elections of 6 November 1934 Scott Sutherland who stood as a 'progressive' candidate was elected councillor for Ruthrieston ward, replacing councillor John Milne who had retired. By November 1935 he was convenor of the Housing Committee. He was responsible for the Kincorth Housing Scheme, for which he first set out a vision in 1936. By the end of the year as housing convenor he had increased the number of council houses being built from 250 to 800 per year. By 1946, a quarter of Aberdeen's population had been re-housed with 7,000 slum houses demolished and 8,500 new houses built. He visited the USSR behind the iron curtain, the US, the Caribbean, Canada, Scandinavia, Australia, New Zealand and the Far East as an ambassador of the city.

It was reported in September 1961 that councillor Scott Sutherland, a "chain smoker" who smoked "between fifty and sixty a day" had tabled a motion for an upcoming council meeting that the Royal Toast be moved forward to after Grace being said at unofficial luncheons, explaining "I have got to sit there gasping for a smoke until they get through the sweet, cheese and biscuits and reach the coffee stage." The motion failed.

== Personal life ==
Despite having lost a leg in his early years, he overcame the disability. He become a good tennis player, swimmer, cricketer and fisherman. He preferred riding a motorcycle to a car. He was also an expert bridge player and a leading member of the Aberdeen Magical Society.

In the 1920s and early 1930s Sutherland lived at Beechgrove House, but he sold it to the BBC in 1936 after which it became their studio, replacing their previous one in Belmont Street. He then bought Garthdee House with the long-term intention of giving it to the School of Architecture at Gray's.

In 1930 Scott Sutherland had married Edith Iris Webber, who he divorced in 1941. In 1948 he met Georgina Buchanan, then secretary to the Governor of Hong Kong on a ship to Australia. they married in 1950 setting up home in Garthdee House,

When he died on 13 June 1963, Scott Sutherland was still a councillor for Ruthrieston Ward, having served more than 28 years in the role.

== Bibliography ==
- Fat Went Fast – Johnson, 1956
- Life on One Leg – Johnson, 1957
