= Seaton Baxter =

British designer

- Born: 1939 (age 86–87); Aberdeen, Scotland

Academic work
- Main interests: Ecological Design, Farm Buildings, Complex Systems

Seaton Hall Baxter, OBE (born 1939) is an emeritus professor at the Robert Gordon University and Honorary Professor at the University of Dundee where he acts as the head of the Centre for the Study of Natural Design and postgraduate supervisor. He has also taught at Schumacher College.

Baxter was born in Aberdeen, Scotland. He worked for over twenty years in agricultural buildings research at the North of Scotland College of Agriculture's Scottish Farm Buildings Investigation Unit before joining the Robert Gordon University in 1983 as Head of the School of Construction Management, Property and Surveying. At the Robert Gordon University he acted as Assistant Principal, Dean and Reader where he established the Centre for Environmental Studies in 1994 and the first ever MSc in Ecological Design.

Baxter has worked with several Scottish environmental NGO's including the Scottish Environment Link, Association for the Protection of Rural Scotland, Deeside Forest Advisory Group and was formerly a board member of Scottish Natural Heritage and chairman of Scottish Outdoor Education Centres.

He has academic qualifications in building technology and philosophy.

He was appointed an OBE in 1998 for his services to Scottish Natural Heritage and to the Environment.

== Significant publications ==
- Intensive Pig Production Publisher: Granada (1984) ISBN 0246112344
