= Scott Sutherland School of Architecture and Built Environment =

Coordinates: 57.1184°N 2.1447°W

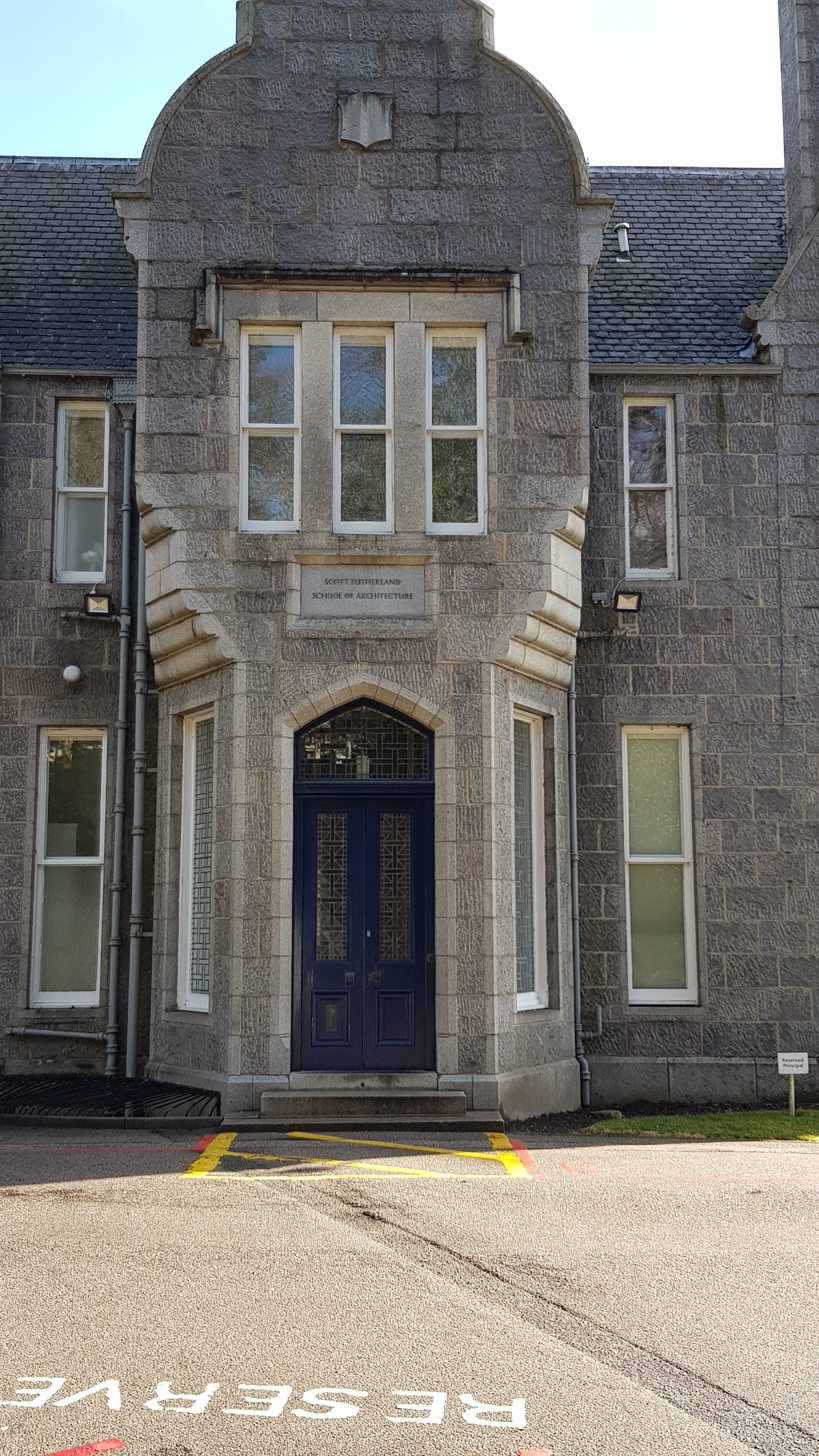
- Established: 24 May 1957; 68 years ago
- Location: Aberdeen, Scotland
- Affiliations: Robert Gordon University
- Website: www.rgu.ac.uk/sss

Listed Building – Category B
- Official name: Garthdee House (Scott Sutherland School of Architecture)
- Designated: 30 April 2001
- Reference no.: LB47908

The Scott Sutherland School of Architecture and Built Environment is an architecture school administered by Robert Gordon University. It is located on the university's campus in Aberdeen, Scotland.

== History ==
The Scott Sutherland School of Architecture opened on 24 May 1957. It takes its name from Thomas Scott Sutherland, an Aberdeen architect and city councillor, who donated the school's main building and grounds in July 1953.

The Scott Sutherland School of Architecture and Built Environment was formed by the merging of the School of Construction, Property and Surveying and the Scott Sutherland School of Architecture.

== Program ==
The current head of School is Professor David McClean. The School offers a Master of Architecture (MArch) programme as a first degree in architecture, and BSc Honours degrees in Surveying, Architectural Technology and Construction Design and Management. Postgraduate courses include the Graduate Diploma in Surveying and MSc courses in Advanced Architectural Studies, Construction Project Management, Property Development and Visualisation in Architecture and the Built Environment. Research at the School includes work concerning sustainable design, visualisation, collaborative and participatory design, pedagogy and project management.

== Alumni ==
- Maxwell Hutchinson, architect and broadcaster
- Willie Miller, urban planner
- Knut Selberg, planner, architect, and urban designer
