= Article 25 =

- Type: Non-profit organisation
- Industry: Architecture, International Development, Non Profit
- Founded: 31 October 2005
- Founders: Maxwell Hutchinson, Dr Victoria Harris, Jack Pringle
- Headquarters: London, UK
- Area served: Worldwide
- Key people: Gemma Holding (Chief Executive)
- Services: Architecture; Infrastructure; Project Management; International Aid; Disaster-resistant Infrastructure
- Revenue: 798,085 pound sterling (2019)
- Number of employees: 8 (2023, 2024)
- Website: https://www.article-25.org/

Article 25 is the UK’s leading international architectural NGO that builds high-quality hospitals, schools and homes in the places that need them most. Registered charity number 1112621, Article 25 has designed and delivered over 100 projects for NGOs and governments worldwide, tackling challenges like earthquake risks, remote locations, extreme weather, and unreliable power supplies. Thanks to Article 25's work, more children are able to complete their education, healthcare is within reach of more communities, and people have safer homes that can withstand a changing climate.

== History ==
Article 25 was established on 31 October 2005 by Maxwell Hutchinson as President, Dr Victoria Harris as founder-CEO and Jack Pringle as Chair. Following the Indian Ocean tsunami in 2004, the founders recognised the potential impact the built environment could have on saving lives and preventing natural hazards from turning into full-blown disasters. Originally named "Architects for Aid", the brief of the organisation expanded quickly and the new name Article 25 made reference to the principles of the 25th Article in the Universal Declaration of Human Rights that safe and adequate shelter is a fundamental human right. Since it was formed, Article 25 has been governed by a distinguished trustee board including three RIBA Presidents: Maxwell Hutchinson, Sunand Prasad and Jack Pringle. The Patron of Article 25 is Norman Foster, a key figure in British modernist architecture. Many of the UK's great architects and several RIBA presidents have also been trustees over the years.

== Activity ==
Article 25 is an architectural non-governmental organisation (NGO) that provides design and project management support for building projects worldwide. The organisation collaborates with international governments and other NGOs to deliver sustainable buildings in over 35 countries, including Haiti, Tanzania, Morocco, Niger, Rwanda, Ethiopia, Lesotho, Sierra Leone, India, Pakistan, and Myanmar, among others.

Article 25 is known for projects like Collège Amadou Hampaté Bâ in Niamey, Niger, recognised by Architonic as a Project of the Year, and honoured by the Institution of Structural Engineers, the Royal Institute of British Architects (RIBA) with a 2024 International Award for Excellence, and the American Institute of Architects (AIA) UK Awards for its use of low-carbon local materials and training of local masons.

Article 25 specialises in healthcare architecture in remote regions. They worked with The Leprosy Mission to establish a Trauma Centre at Anandaban Hospital in Nepal, addressing medical needs after the 2015 earthquakes. The centre is built to seismic standards with locally sourced materials, serving leprosy patients and the local community.

After Hurricane Maria in 2017, Article 25 initiated the Dominica Housing Recovery Project with the World Bank to construct 450 hurricane-resistant homes using local construction methods. This project aimed to address housing needs and support community resilience, particularly benefiting the Kalinago people.

In 2023, Article 25 launched the More than a Building network made up of major players in the construction industry such as Barratt Developments, Gardiner & Theobald LLP, Price & Myers, and WSP.
