= Titi Horsfall =

Nigerian author

Titi Horsfall is a Nigerian author. She is a recipient of the African Literature Prize from African Achievers Awards.

She has a bachelor's degree in marketing, a masters in banking and finance, and an MBA in oil and gas management from Robert Gordon University, Aberdeen.

Horsfall received the award for African Literature Prize from African Achievers Awards in 2016. She was one of the authors at the London Book Fair in 2016.

== Selected works ==
- Orphan to a Queen, 2012
- Influence of a King, 2015
