= Linda Lawton =

Researcher in cyanobacteria, Fellow of the Royal Society of Edinburgh

Linda Lawton FRSE
- Occupation: researcher
- Employer: Robert Gordon University Aberdeen
- Known for: research into cyanobacteria and water safety
- Awards: Fellow of the Royal Society of Edinburgh 2021

Linda Lawton, Ph.D., FRSE is a Scottish researcher in microcystins and toxins produced by cyanobacteria and has researched into the impact of the so-called 'blue-green algae" from drinking water supply. Her detection method is now used worldwide and was used by the World Health Organization to develop drinking water safety standards, scientists are trained in it from Sri Lanka to fish farms in Scotland, and Lawton is investigating potential cancer treatments and positive uses such as digesting waste plastics in microbiology. She was made a Fellow of the Royal Society of Edinburgh in 2021. Lawton is Professor of Environmental Biology at the Robert Gordon University, Aberdeen.

== Education and career ==
Lawton studied Brewing and Microbiology and Heriot Watt University, Edinburgh and began her academic career in microbiology in the 1980s at the University of Surrey Center for Environmental Strategy. She then worked at Dundee University, for seven years and also obtained her PhD on "biological effects & significance of cyanobacterial peptide toxins", bringing a focus on cyanobacteria for the past 30 years. She became group research leader at Robert Gordon University (RGU) Aberdeen in 1994, and Full Professor in 2007, and is widely cited with substantial network of international collaborators including commercial partnerships. She lives in Stonehaven.

== Research and publications ==
Lawton's research group investigates cyanobacteria and algae and water treatment, photocatalysis and novel biofuels. She has 159 publications to date with 5985 citations, and has been invited to write book chapters and present to learned societies and research conferences globally. Lawton's research has been reported both in local press and nationally recognised in a political magazine as leading one of the breakthrough projects in Scotland, and also gave 'fun' science communications on biochemistry.

Her formal list of research funding awards which is estimated to be over £10million to date, and publications are on Orcid or Researchgate A recent £1.4million collaboration with Queen's Belfast and St. Andrew's colleagues, under the banner of CyanoSol is looking at "in reservoir destruction of blue-green algae and their toxins".
