= Willie Miller (urbanist) =

British urban planner (1950–2021)

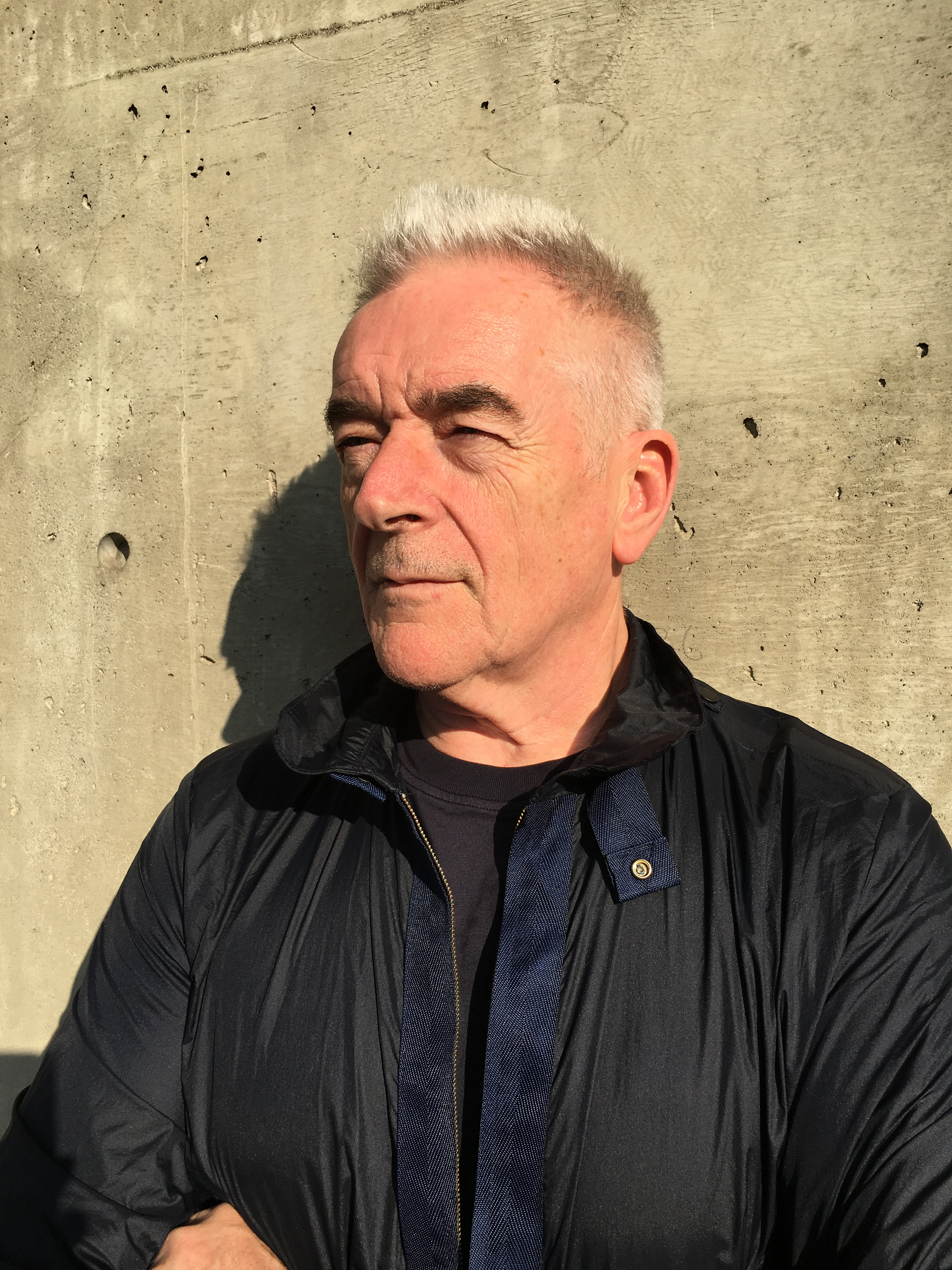
portrait of Willie Miller, October 2016

Willie Miller (1950 – 12 January 2021) was a designer and urbanist based in Glasgow, Scotland. He was Principal of Willie Miller Urban Design (WMUD), a design practice based in the West End of Glasgow. Miller studied at Glasgow School of Art, then at the Scott Sutherland School of Architecture and The Built Environment in Aberdeen, and was assistant director of Planning at Monklands District Council, prior to establishing WMUD in 1996. He died in January 2021 at the age of 70.

== Career ==
Willie Miller worked (see location map of projects) throughout the United Kingdom of Great Britain and Northern Ireland, the Channel Islands, the Republic of Ireland and the United States (with partner practice Studio Cascade). Projects undertaken by WMUD under his direction include the production of a Healthy Sustainable Neighbourhoods Model for Glasgow City Council, development guidance for the Energetica project in Aberdeenshire, a cultural study of Derry City Walls, tourism studies of Moyle and County Leitrim in the Republic of Ireland, the spatial aspects of the Regional Strategic Framework for the Irish Cross Border Area Network (ICBAN) with KPMG and a study of the Crafts Industry in Southern Ireland commissioned by the Crafts Council for Ireland in association with a consortium of LEADER Companies. These projects suggest a move towards strategic design, though the practice maintains a core of strategic urbanism work through recent projects including a new town centre and riverfront strategy for Dumbarton, a concept design study for Leven town centre in Fife and physical proposals for the town centre of Strathaven.

Willie Miller promoted a collaborative and contextual approach to urban design - working across disciplines, in liaison with local communities, businesses and organisational stakeholders, and respecting local context and heritage.

=== Community work ===
As well as being a practising urbanist, Miller was also a commentator on urban design issues, a member of the editorial board of Urban Realm magazine, and was involved with urban design education at the University of Strathclyde's Department of Architecture and the University of Glasgow's Department of Urban Studies. He was a member of the Architectural Association. Miller was also a member of the Paris-based Association Internationale de Développement Urbain (INTA); he was a member of the INTA Panels for Bordeaux Metropolitan 2010 and Repositioning of the South-West sector of the Lyon Metropolitan Area: Givors-Grigny in January 2013. He wrote for The Guardian, The Architectural Heritage Society of Scotland magazine and Urban Realm magazine, and lectured on European Urbanism at Wayne State University, Detroit.

He was also Director of Co-occurrence, a digital agency based in the West End of Glasgow which creates web presence, graphics and photography for small businesses and public agencies. He talked about his photography at the Edinburgh Pecha Kucha held during the Edinburgh Festival in August 2012 and won a commendation for his work in the Jon-Marc Creaney Photography Competition organised by the Glasgow Institute of Architects in 2012.
