= Our Most Holy Redeemer =

Coordinates: 51.5255°N 0.1092°W

Our Most Holy Redeemer, Clerkenwell
- Church of Our Most Holy Redeemer
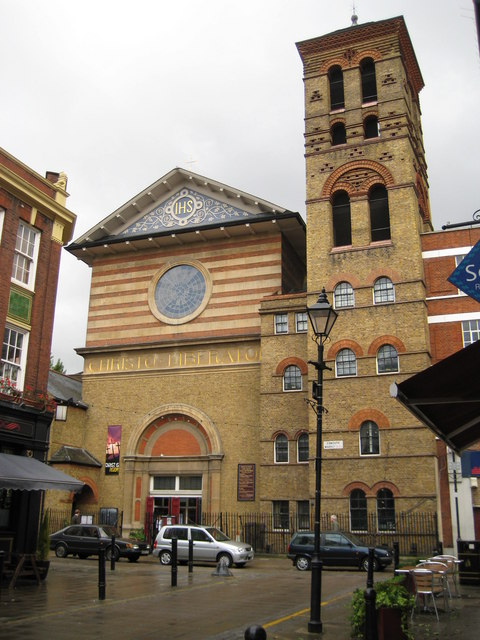
- Our Most Holy Redeemer, Clerkenwell
- OS grid reference: TQ 31264 82428
- Location: Clerkenwell, Islington, London
- Country: England
- Denomination: Church of England
- Churchmanship: Traditional Catholic
- Website: holyredeemerclerkenwell.com

History
- Status: Active
- Dedication: Christ the Redeemer

Architecture
- Functional status: Parish church
- Heritage designation: Grade II* listed
- Designated: 29 December 1950
- Architect: John Dando Sedding
- Style: Italianate
- Completed: 1888

Administration
- Province: Canterbury
- Diocese: London
- Archdeaconry: Hackney
- Deanery: Islington

Clergy
- Bishop: The Rt Revd Jonathan Baker (AEO)
- Vicar: Fr Christopher Trundle SSC

Our Most Holy Redeemer is a late 19th-century church in Clerkenwell, London, England, by the architect John Dando Sedding. It is an Anglo-Catholic church in the Diocese of London of the Church of England. It is at the junction of Exmouth Market and Rosebery Avenue in the London Borough of Islington. The church with attached clergy house, campanile, and parish hall is a Grade II*-listed building.

== History ==
This Italianate church was built in 1888 to the designs of J. D. Sedding, and completed, after his death, by his assistant Henry Wilson, 1892–95. The church, which was built in the grounds of the former Spa Fields Chapel, originally comprised just the building on the left in the illustration, the campanile tower and clergy house on the right being added in 1906. The inscription on the cornice of the original structure reads Christo Liberatori translated as 'To Christ The Redeemer'.

The interior of the church, including the baldacchino, was modelled upon Brunelleschi's Santo Spirito, Florence. Sculptural carving to the interior is by F. W. Pomeroy.

== Present day ==
The Church of Our Most Holy Redeemer is within the Traditional Catholic tradition of the Church of England and receives alternative episcopal oversight from the Bishop of Fulham (currently Jonathan Baker).

== Gallery ==
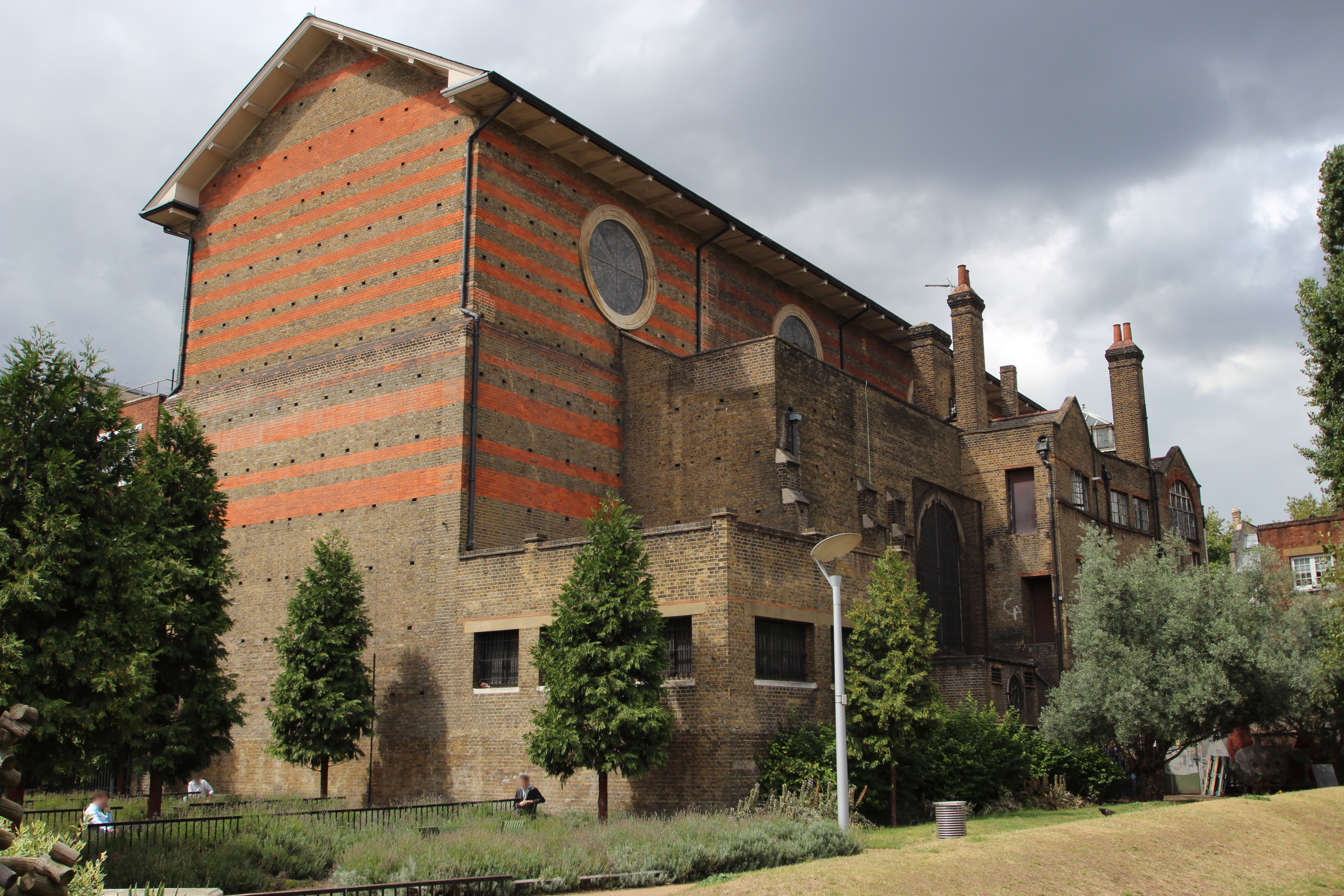
Side of the church

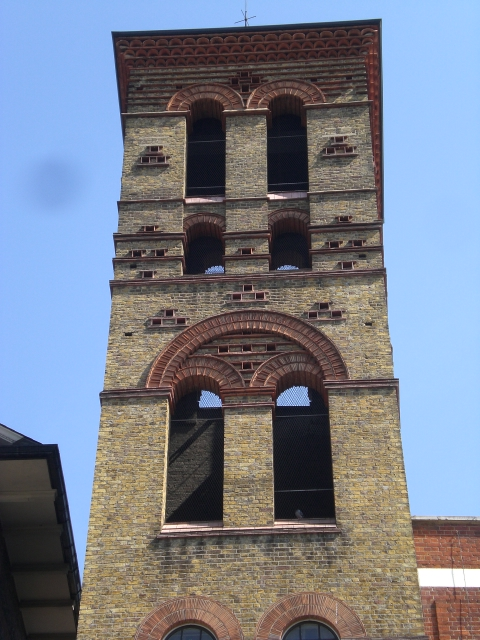
Tower of the church

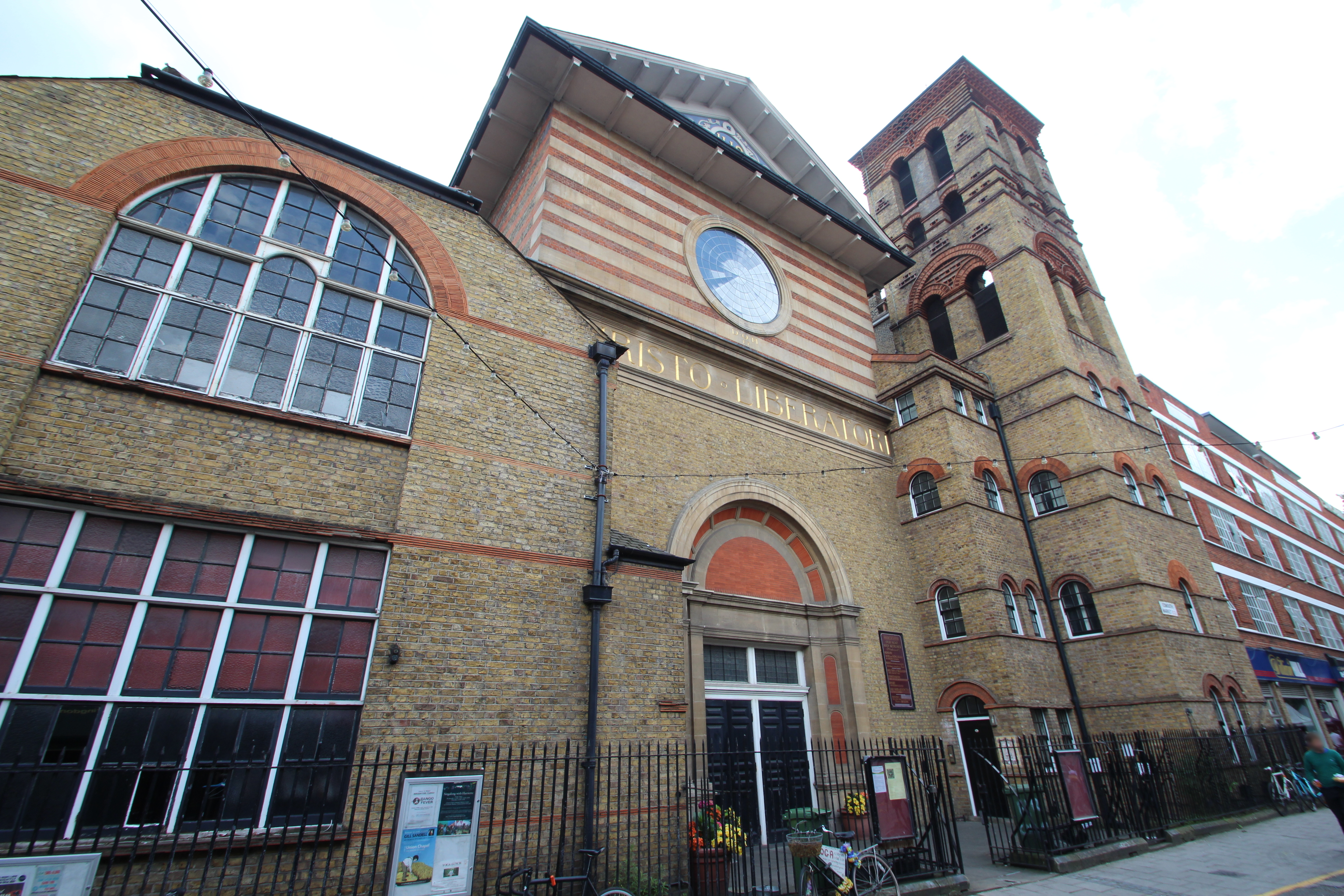
Alternative view of the front of the church
