= Exmouth Market =

Street and market in Clerkenwell, London

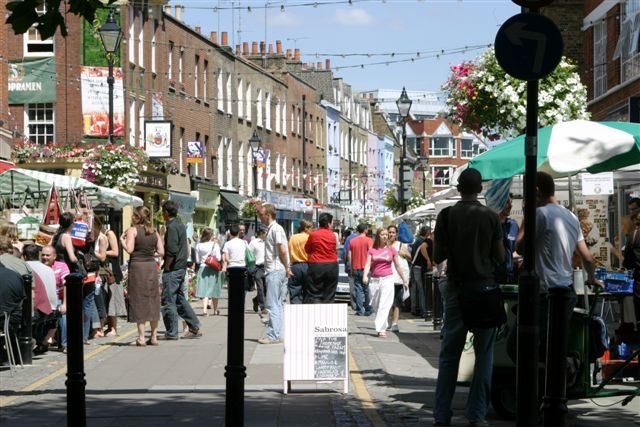
- The street market in November 2006
- Location: Exmouth Market; Clerkenwell, Islington, Greater London; 51°31′33″N 0°06′32″W
- Management: Islington London Borough Council
- Owner: Islington London Borough Council
- Environment: Outdoor
- Goods sold: Various
- Days normally open: Monday–Saturday
- Number of tenants: 32 (21 permanent traders)
- Interactive map of Exmouth Market

Exmouth Market is a semi-pedestrianised street in Clerkenwell in the London Borough of Islington, and the location of an outdoor street market of 32 stalls.

== History ==
Exmouth Market draws its name from the Exmouth Arms Pub that is centrally situated in the street. The area has been a market place since the 1890s and a number of the street's buildings date from the 19th century.

Also centrally located on the block of the street opposite the Exmouth Arms is the church of Our Most Holy Redeemer, Clerkenwell, built in 1887 on the site of the Spa Fields Chapel. The church is London's only Italian basilica-style church.

The south-east corner of the street was the site for the London Spa which dates back to 1730 and is one of Clerkenwell's most famous resorts. It was rebuilt several times and called the London Spa until 2002. It is now known as Spa Fields.

=== 1990s: Rehabilitation ===
The street and surrounding area had previously held a reputation as a run down and seedy part of Central London. Since the mid-to-late nineties the street has undergone a steady regeneration, and Exmouth Market is now home to a large number of restaurants, cafes and bars, as well as independent book, record and gift shops, a range of design and architecture companies, and Eland Publishing, the travel literature imprint.

A distinguishing feature of the area is that nearly every restaurant, cafe and bar in the street offer outside seating and cover, which is uncommon for suburban London outside of High Street areas – this creates a sidewalk cafe ambiance.

== Street market ==
In autumn 2006, the Exmouth Market Trader's association decided to reinstate Exmouth Market's street market. It costs £35 a week to occupy land the size of a regular stall. Stallholders include local and well-known food companies and producers, as well as jewellery and gifts from East London designers.

The market was originally held every Friday (between 11–6) and Saturday (between 9–4) (as indicated on a banner), but hours have changed, and it now runs during weekdays only (including Thursday and Friday): food stalls run primarily 11–2.

== Film ==
The street was used for location shooting for Madonna's directorial debut, Filth and Wisdom and also for A Private Function.
