= Theatres designed by Frank Matcham =

List of theatres designed by English architect Frank Matcham (1854 -1920)

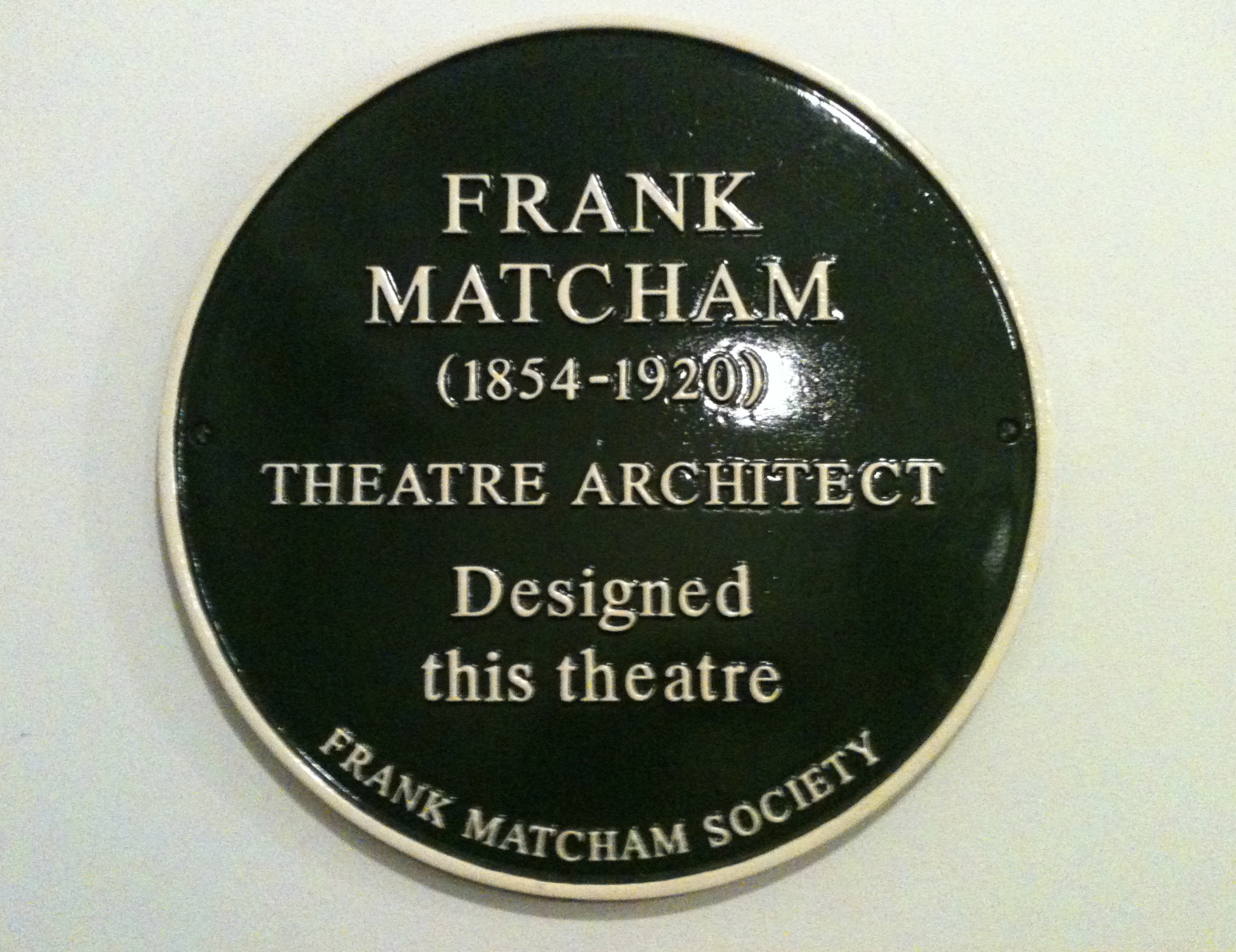
Plaque at the London Coliseum, unveiled by the Frank Matcham Society in 2014

The English architect Frank Matcham was responsible for the design and refurbishment of around 164 buildings, mostly theatres, throughout the United Kingdom. He entered the architectural profession when he was 21, in 1874, and joined the practice of J. T. Robinson, his future father-in-law, a few years later. Matcham completed his first solo design, the Elephant and Castle theatre, in June 1879, having taken over Robinson's practice upon his death. He founded his own practice, Matcham & Co., in 1883 which experienced much prosperity. His most successful period was between 1892 and 1912, during which there was an increased demand for variety theatres which resulted in the closure and dismantlement of many music halls, which had become outdated.

Although being more prolific in the provinces, Matcham is perhaps best known for his work in London under Moss Empires, for whom he designed the Hippodrome in 1900, Hackney Empire (1901), London Coliseum (1903), Shepherd's Bush Empire (1903), London Palladium (1910), and the Victoria Palace in 1911. He seldom ever strayed from theatrical design but on occasion, renovated public houses and, in 1898, designed a number of buildings for the redevelopment of Briggate in Leeds, including the Cross and County Arcades.

Matcham retired to Southend-on-sea, Essex, shortly before the First World War, and left his business, Matcham & Co., to his business partners, R.A. Briggs and F. G. M. Chancellor. Matcham died in 1920. Many of the 164 buildings that he either designed or rebuilt during his 40-year career, were demolished in the 1960s. There are currently around 52 known structures that survive, as of 2017. According to the dramatist, Alan Bennett, "there was scarcely a town in the United Kingdom that didn't boast one of Matcham's theatres and, though scores have been lost, enough remain to testify to the achievement of someone who was undoubtedly [the U.K's] greatest theatrical architect."

== Key ==
Explanation of the three listed building grades
Grade	Criteria
I	Buildings of exceptional interest, sometimes considered to be internationally important. Only 2.5% of listed buildings are Grade I.
II*	Particularly important buildings of more than special interest; 8% of listed buildings are Grade II*.
II	Buildings of national importance and special interest; 91.7% of all listed buildings are in this class and it is the most likely grade of listing for a home owner.

== Buildings ==
=== Surviving theatres ===
Date	Theatre	Photograph	Location	Notes	Grade
1891	Everyman Theatre	A theatre audltorium with gold, decorative walls and ceiling	Cheltenham	Built as an Opera House, from which it took its original name, for the Cheltenham Theatre and Opera House Company. It was renamed the Everyman Theatre in 1960.	II
1894	Grand Theatre	A theatre audltorium with gold, decorative walls and ceiling, and blue stage curtain.	Blackpool, England	Built at a cost of £20,000 for Thomas Sergenson for the intended use of a drama theatre. The exterior was built using brick with stone dressings and the plasterwork in the auditorium was carried out by the Plastic Decoration Company, who were based in London. The Grand was listed as Grade II in January 1972, and closed later that year. Because of its listing, permission to demolish it was refused the following year. The theatre remained closed until 1977, when it received a £200,000 renovation.	II*
1894	Theatre Royal	A red brick building facade seen from the front	Westgate, Wakefield	Built as a drama theatre at a cost of £13,000 on the site of the c. 18th century Theatre Royal. Matcham's building was originally named the Opera House and is the smallest of his existing theatres. It became a cinema in 1955 and in 1966, a bingo hall. In 2012 the Theatre received funding from the Heritage Lottery Fund for a £2.6 million restoration project.	II*
1897	Grand Theatre, Lancaster		Lancaster	First opened as "The Theatre, Lancaster" in 1782 before being turned into a music hall in 1843; extended in 1857; altered and renamed 'The Athenaeum' in 1884; Matcham's involvement was to add the fly tower in 1897 as part of alterations; re-opened as "The Grand Theatre" in September 1908.	II*
23 December 1895	Grand Opera House		Great Victoria Street, Belfast	Warden Ltd instructed Matcham to design a theatre for drama and circus performers and was built in the oriental style on an open corner plot to create a three-dimensional build up from the low corners to the higher gabled centrepiece. The dome-shaped minarets are the only surviving oriental motifs on any of Matcham's interiors. The author Brian Mercer Walker describes the theatre as being "...by far the most notable surviving example of any theatre in the United Kingdom, decorated in [oriental] style." The building was threatened with demolition in the 1970s but was saved by a campaign, led by the Ulster Architectural Society. As a result, it became the first listed building in Northern Ireland, although its grading has never been made public.	Listed
1899	Richmond Theatre	A red brick building facade seen from the front	Richmond upon Thames	Originally known as the Theatre Royal and Opera House. The theatre is of red brick with buff terracotta dressings. The facade is of 4 storeys. The entrance canopy is a modern addition. The interior features a marble and wood panelled entrance hall and staircase and an elaborately decorated auditorium.	II*
16 July 1900	Gaiety Theatre		Douglas, Isle of Man	In 1976 the restoration began under the direction of architect and theatre expert, Victor Glasstone. The theatre underwent further restoration, under the direction of Mervin Stokes, MBE, from the 1990s to replicate its 1900 opening condition in time for the centenary celebration in 2000. Exactly 100 years after opening, on 16 July 2000, the centenary was celebrated with a performance of "The Telephone Girl" which opened the Gaiety in 1900 and following which was a performance of "The Corsican Brothers," a popular play which in Victorian times and a special 'Corsican Trap' was constructed for the performance. It is believed to be the only working Corsican Trap in the World. Another unique feature of the theatre is the working Act Drop depicting a dancing lady.	
1900	Theatre Royal		Upper Parliament Street, Nottingham	Restorations and alterations by Matcham of an existing theatre by C.J. Phipps in 1884. Phipps built his theatre on the site of Landport Hall that existed there from 1854, but was turned into a theatre two years later. The interior decoration is intact and much unaltered. Matcham's nautical theme in the auditorium of ships, dolphins, anchors, mermaids and shells around the circle and boxes is still much evident.	II*
1900	London Hippodrome	Red sandstone frontage in the ornate and French Renaissance style and with a theatrically Baroque skyline. The wording "London Hippodrome" face to the front on the upper level, also in red sandstone	City of Westminster, London	The Hippodrome is contained within a block also comprising a public house, shops, and chambers, all designed by Matcham. The theatre was built as a circus and then altered, in 1909, to a theatre of varieties. The theatre survives but has been radically altered internally and is now a casino and entertainment complex.	II
1901	Hackney Empire	A red brick building with buff terracota dressings; Victorian Baroque in style. Two storeys with a three bay front. Large, illuminating wording of "Hackney Empire" on the front, in red lettering.	Hackney, London	Built for Oswald Stoll, who initially intended for it to become his headquarters, before changing his mind and relocating to the Central London. The change of plan, midway through construction, resulted in a drastic reduction in budget for the Empire in order to raise extra finances for Stoll's eventual headquarters, the London Coliseum. Matcham rushed together a secondary, more cheaper design of the Empire's façade and presented it to Stoll on a piece of scrap tracing paper. It was an exterior design that Matcham always loathed but was one, according to the historian Michael Sell, that demonstrated the architect's "seemingly endless powers of invention" and one that will "forever remain[ed] a landmark". The auditorium is noted by Historic England as being "one of the most exuberant Matcham interiors in Britain", while the theatrical author, Brian Walker, called the Empire's interior "the most perfect Matcham interior in Greater London.	II*
1901	Theatre Royal		Newcastle upon Tyne	Granted its Royal licence by King George III, the Theatre Royal Newcastle opened on Drury Lane off Mosley Street in 1788 and soon established itself as one of England’s leading theatres. In February 1837, the Theatre moved to Grey Street, a flagship building in Grainger and Dobson’s famous city plan. It features what is generally regarded as the finest Theatre façade in the UK, later combined with a fine 1901 auditorium by the great Theatre architect, Frank Matcham, after the original interior had been destroyed by fire during a performance of Macbeth in 1899.	
1903	Shepherd's Bush Empire		Shepherd's Bush, Hammersmith, London	Theatre, later a television studio for the BBC. It features an Arts and Crafts influence which, according to Historic England, was unusual for Matcham. Largely altered from the original design.	II
1903	Olympia Social Club		West Derby Road, Liverpool	Opening in April 1905, Liverpool Olympia was designed as a purpose built indoor circus and variety theatre by renowned architect Frank Matcham. The venue enjoys a rich history within the performing arts, having hosted a variety of theatrical and music productions, with performers as diverse as Harry Houdini and The Beatles! It has also housed a cinema, dance hall and a bingo hall over its 100+ year life span, becoming one of the first cinemas outside of London to upgrade from silent movies to “the talkies” in 1929. In 1990 the current owners purchased the Grafton Rooms, next door to Olympia, and while operating this as a successful nightclub, they began refurbishing the Olympia to bring it back to life after several years of closure. Eventually reopening in 2000, it has been a firm favourite among the local music scene ever since. It now holds a wide range of events including live music, club events, sports and comedy, as well as providing filming locations to well-known TV shows, films, advertisements and music videos.	II*
1 Jun 1903	Buxton Opera House		Buxton	The Opera House was opened on 1 June 1903 and cost £25,000. The Opera House ran as a successful theatre, receiving touring companies until 1927, when it was turned into a cinema. Silent films were shown until 1932, when the theatre was wired for sound and could present 'talkies'. The Opera House also became the venue for an annual summer theatre festival from 1936 to 1942, two of them in conjunction with Lillian Bayliss and her London-based Old Vic company. After the Second World War, the theatre continued to serve primarily as a cinema, but closed in the mid-1970s due to disrepair. It was later restored back to a theatre, re-opening on 30 July 1979, with a performance of Donizetti's "Lucia di Lammermoor". The decoration is in the style of baroque revival, executed by Dejong, Matcham's trusted fibroplasterer. The decoration is described by Nikolaus Pevsner as being "sumptuous". Matcham's innovative ventilation system is still evident.	II*
1903 (restoration only)	Devonshire Park Theatre	Light grey facade of a large building with "Devonshire Park Theatre" inscribed on the central face	Eastbourne, Sussex	Built in 1884, by Henry Currey. The interior received a heavy restoration by Matcham in 1903.	II
1903	Royal Hall	Picture taken from the grand circle of a theatre auditorium with gold decorative features with a small Centre stage and red curtain	Harrogate	Concert hall, the design for which was won by the architect Robert Beale in 1899. Matcham was enlisted to assist with the project and became the senior architect. The interior is solely attributed to Matcham. The building was attached to the pre-existing Concert Room of 1835.	II*
12 Sep 1904	King's Theatre		Glasgow	Built for Howard & Wyndham Ltd on a prominent corner site with two mains facades.	Category 'A' listed by Historic Environment Scotland.
24 Dec 1904	London Coliseum		City of Westminster, London	Widely regarded as Matcham's masterpiece by architectural critics, the Coliseum was built as Oswald Stoll's headquarters. The Coliseum opened in 1904 and it was Stoll's aim to provide family entertainment in a lavish setting. The facade was designed in the free Italian Renaissance style and the auditorium features a Romanesque theme. The seating capacity exceeds those of the nearby Theatre Royal, Drury Lane and Royal Opera House. The stage featured a revolutionary, £70,000 revolving stage which was the first of its kind in Great Britain. This allowed for imaginative ideas, including the theatre's extravagant display celebrating Derby Day, with guesting jockeys riding real horses, galloping against the moving revolve; this was removed in 1976. The theatre received a £4 million refurbishment in 2004. Now home to the English National Opera. The theatrical historian Brian Mercer Walker called it the "fruit of close collaboration and understanding between client and architect." He further noted: "Matcham's frequently noticed skill in planning is here matched by a different kind of wizardry. Few of his contemporaries could have made so memorable an architectural statement on so short a frontage in such an unpretentious thoroughfare. It is much more impressive than, for example, the neighbouring Garrick Theatre of 1889..." According to the theatrical magazine The Stage, Matcham's design provided "a handsome marble staircase, the landmark tower topped by a revolving globe and an impressive range of amenities, including spacious tea-rooms on each floor, lifts to the theatre's upper levels, lavishly decorated retiring rooms, a roof-garden with a glass-domed roof and an information bureau from which messages and telegrams could be sent and where doctors might register their whereabouts in case of emergencies."	II*
1906	His Majesty's Theatre		Aberdeen	His Majesty’s Theatre is a category A listed proscenium arch theatre designed by celebrated architect Frank Matcham and opened in December 1906. It is a fully equipped producing and receiving theatre with a capacity of 1400 which since its opening has welcomed international touring companies, nationally renowned artists and Scottish and homegrown talent.	
1907	Kings Theatre		Southsea, Portsmouth	Matcham's last theatre for Frederick Purcell, an extended member of the Revills, a family of theatre proprietors from Scotland whom Matcham started working for in 1886. The auditorium achieves a maximum seating capacity for the confined site on which it was built. The building retains its original main entrance and paybox. The decoration is in the Rococo style in white and gold. Main entrance foyer has painted ceiling depicting a lady who may have been the original owner.	II*
1910	London Palladium		City of Westminster	Built as variety theatre to replace Hengler's Cirque, a building made entirely of wood by Matcham's father-in-law J.T. Robinson, which occupied the same site. The original architect was Walter Gibbons whose aim was to rival the Coliseum and the Hippodrome. Matcham took over and completed restorations during which the façade was modified and the auditorium redesigned. The interior is unaltered.	II*
1911	Victoria Palace Theatre		City of Westminster	Built by the variety magnate Alfred Butt in the baroque style. It was Matcham's last London theatre after which he shortly retired. It was built on the site formally occupied by the Royal Standard music hall, which itself had begun as the Royal Standard pub in the 1830s. Moy's music hall was attached to it in the 1840s and then renamed the Royal Standard Concert Rooms in 1854. The building received several refurbishments thereafter before being acquired by Butt in 1910; the Palace opened on 6 November 1911.	II*
16 Dec 1912	Bristol Hippodrome		Bristol	Matcham's last major work. At the time of opening the theatre featured a large water tank under the front half of the stage which could hold 100,000 gallons (450,000 litres) of water. There were four horizontal stage lifts in the tank allowing different depths to be set up or the water to be agitated. The theatre also featured a retractable dome for ventilation.	II

Note: The source for Matcham's buildings, except as otherwise noted, is David Wilmore, Frank Matcham & Co, pp. 178–183.

=== Other buildings ===
Date	Theatre	Photograph	Location	Notes	Grade
1899	Tower Ballroom and Tower Circus	A dance hall seen from the interior looking towards the stage stone a circus arena seen from one half of the seating, looking towards the ring and the other side of the seating area	Blackpool	Built for the Blackpool Tower Company as part of the seaside town's regeneration to attract tourism. The ballroom's interior was Matcham's only design for the Blackpool Tower complex. The rest of the designs were carried out by Maxwell & Tuke. The ballroom was seriously damaged in a fire in 1956, but was restored to its original design by Andrew Mazzei at a cost of £500,000 two years later.	I
1898–1900	Numbers 1–43 and Cross Arcade	A wide shopping precinct, seen from within the interior, with glass roofs, detailed artwork to the cornices, and shop fronts to either side	Leeds	Numbers 1–43 shops and offices; Cross Arcade, shopping precinct. Built for the Leeds Estates Company as part of the County Arcade development. The central dome is believed to have been based on the 1865 Galleria Vittorio Emanuele II in Milan.	II*
1898–1900	49 and 51, Vicar Lane; 2–24, King Edward Street; 115–120, Brigatte		Leeds	Shops and offices, built for the Leeds Estates Company as part of the County Arcade development.	II
1898–1900	"53–63, Vicar Lane, 2–12, 14 and 16 Cross Arcade, 1–11, 11A and 13–35, Queen Victoria Street, 104–108 and 110–114, Briggate"		Leeds	Built for the Leeds Estates Company as part of the County Arcade development. The central dome is believed to have been based on the 1865 Galleria Vittorio Emanuele II in Milan.	II
1898	Entrance building to the former Theatre of Varieties		South Tyneside	Built on the site of Thornton's Theatre of Varieties, the Empire Theatre was constructed by Matcham in association with William and T. R. Milburn and opened on 13 February 1899. The Empire's layout was unusual inasmuch that the entrance and foyer were located on King Street with the auditorium being in another building, separated by a narrow street. The theatre today is much modified and altered, not covered by the buildings listing. The entrance is all that remains from Matcham's original design.	II
1904	45 and 46, Chandos Place		City of Westminster	Terraced offices, possibly by Matcham as part of the Coliseum theatre development.	II
1905	15,16 and 17, Hatfields		Southwark	Former printing works, now flats, built in 1905.	II

Note: The source for Matcham's buildings, except as otherwise noted, is David Wilmore, Frank Matcham & Co, pp. 178–183.

=== Demolished theatres ===
Opening date	Theatre	Location	Proprietor	Seating capacity	Notes
4 March 1892	Empire Palace	Nicholson Street, Edinburgh	Edward Moss	3,000	The first of the Moss Empire theatres. Damaged by fire in 1911 after an illusion by The Great Lafayette failed and caught the auditorium curtain alight, the theatre was subsequently rebuilt to Matcham's original plans. In 1927 the theatre was closed, to be replaced with an entirely new design by architects William & Thomas R. Milburn, which opened in 1928.
4 Nov 1895	Empire	Charles Street, Sheffield	Edward Moss	2,500	Built in the Italian style, the local journals called the exterior "a phantasmagoric piece of architecture" and the interior as being "a dream of loveliness and beauty". Demolished in 1959.
4 May 1896	Empire Palace	Queen Street, Cardiff	Oswald Stoll	2,036	A replacement of a former Empire theatre. Destroyed by fire on 31 October 1899. Rebuilt by Matcham with an increased seating capacity. The building survived until 1961, when it was demolished.
5 Apr 1897	Empire	Sauchiehall Street, Glasgow	Edward Moss and the Glasgow Empire Co.	2,500	Built upon land once occupied by the Gaiety theatre, which was later renamed as the Glasgow Empire. Rebuilt by Matcham and became, in the 1930s, the second largest variety theatre in Britain. Survived until 1963, when it was demolished.
6 Dec 1897	Palace	Analby Road, Hull	Edward Moss and the Liverpool, Leeds and Hull Empire Palaces Co.	1,800	The building adjoined a similar entertainment venue called Hengler's Circus. The Palace doubled as an amphitheatre. Enlarged in 1928 and closed 11 years later. Reopened in 1951 and renamed the Continental Palace in 1957. Closed for the final time in July 1965 and demolished the following year.
28 Feb 1898	Empire Palace	Sherwood Street, Nottingham	Edward Moss	2,500	Designed in the Oriental style with Indian art in the auditorium. The theatre closed in June 1958 and was demolished 11 years later.
29 Aug 1898	Empire Palace	Briggate, Leeds	Edward Moss and the Liverpool, Leeds and Hull Empire Palaces Co.	1,700	Completed in the Flemish style, the Leeds Mercury called the theatre the "handsomest of its kind in the country". They opined that Matcham's plans "[are] a triumph of artistic skill [with] the moulded work being very fine indeed". The theatre closed on 25 February 1961 and was demolished the following year.
3 Jul 1899	Empire Palace	Charles Street, Newport	Oswald Stoll and the Cardiff, Newport and Swansea Co.	Unknown	Built at a cost of £20,000 on the site of a former theatre. The walls were decorated using Japanese wall paper and the ceilings covered in Lincrusta. Long since demolished.
31 Jul 1899	New Cross Empire	New Cross Road, New Cross, London	Edward Moss and the London District Empire Palaces Ltd.	3,000	The Builder described the interior as being in the Louis XIV style. The building was demolished in the late-1950s in favour of the construction of a filling station.
17 Jun 1901	Palace Theatre of Varieties	Belgrave Gate, Leicester	Oswald Stoll and Moss Empires	2,750	Designed in Moresque style. The theatre featured a semi-circular glass and iron domed roof and internally, had rockeries, fountains and dripping wells. The building was demolished in 1960.
4 Dec 1903	Empire Palace,	Newgate Street, Newcastle upon Tyne	Moss Empires	2,200	Matcham virtually rebuilt the Empire from an existing theatre that first opened in 1890. The theatre remained until its demolition in 1963 to make way for a central redevelopment.
18 Jul 1904	Ardwick Empire	Hyde Road, Manchester	Oswald Stoll and Moss Empires	3,000	Decorations by Felix De Jong; built as a variety theatre. The venue became a cinema in 1930 and five years later, was renamed as the New Manchester Hippodrome. Demolished in 1964.
26 Dec 1904	Hippodrome	Oxford Street, Manchester	Oswald Stoll and Moss Empires	Unknown	Built as a hippodrome variety theatre and opened on 26 December 1904 with a variety show and a water spectacle from the London Hippodrome called "Tally Ho!". It closed on 2 March 1935 and was demolished soon after. Rebuilt 7 months later and named The Gaumont Theatre.
14 Oct 1905	Coliseum	Eglington Street, Glasgow	Moss Empires	2,700	The Coliseum started life as a variety theatre and featured two large balconies, painted panels on the ceiling, and a marble-framed It closed and reopened as a cinema in the early 1920s and started showing films full-time in 1925. It became the first venue in Glasgow to show a talking picture in January 1929. It closed as a cinema in 1980 and was used as a bingo hall from the late 80s until 2003. The Coliseum caught fire on 25 May 2009.
5 Sep 1910	Finsbury Park Empire	St Thomas's Road and Prah Road, Finsbury Park, London	Moss Empires	2,000	Built as a variety theatre at a cost of £45,000, it closed in 1960 and was demolished five years later.
4 Oct 1911	New Middlesex	Drury Lane, Holborn	Oswald Stoll, J.L. Grayson, and the Middlesex Theatre of Varieties Ltd.	3,038	Built as a variety theatre on the site of the former Middlesex Music Hall, previously the Old Mogul Saloon, the New Middlesex was renamed in 1919 to the Winter Garden theatre. It was demolished in 1965. The site is now occupied by the Gillian Lynne Theatre.
21 Sep 1912	Wood Green Empire	High Road, Wood Green, London	Oswald Stoll	1,840	Matcham's last London theatre. It was leased by the BBC during the 1950s and 60s who televised variety shows there. It was closed and partially demolished in 1970. The frontage, including the entrance block, still remain.

Note: The source for Matcham's theatres, except as otherwise noted, is Brian Mercer Walker, Frank Matcham: Theatre Architect, pp. 154–173.

=== Theatres demolished since Brian Mercer Walker publication (1980) ===
- 1889 – Theatre Royal, St Helens – Although there is a theatre on the site, it bears little resemblance to its original Matcham design as it was reconstructed in 1964. There were two theatres previous to the current building; the first was also by Matcham and was originally opened by Wallace Revill as the Theatre Royal and Opera House on 4 August 1890.

Mercer Walker, p. 120

- 1892 – Empire Palace, Edinburgh – Mercer Walker, p. 179

== Sources ==
- Baker, Richard Anthony (2014). British Music Hall: An Illustrated History. South Yorkshire: Penn & Sword History. ISBN 978-1-78383-118-0.
- Earl, John (2008). British Theatres and Music Halls. South Yorkshire: Shire Publications. ISBN 978-0-74780-627-1.
- Earl, John; Sell, Michael (2000). The Theatres Trust Guide to British Theatres 1750-1950. London: A. & C. Black. ISBN 978-0-71365-688-6.
- Kilburn, Mike (2002). London's Theatres. London: New Holland. ISBN 978-1-84330-069-4.
- Mercer Walker, Brian (1980). Frank Matcham: Theatre Architect. Belfast: Blackstaff Press. ISBN 978-0-95341-271-6.
- Wilmore, David (2008). Frank Matcham & Co. South Yorkshire: Theatreshire Books. ISBN 978-0-85640-231-9.
