= Matcham =

Matcham may refer to:

- Matcham, New South Wales, Australia

== People ==
- Charles Matcham (1862–1911), English civil engineer and businessman
- Frank Matcham (1854–1920), English architect
- George Matcham (1753–1833), British civil servant in India, and traveller
