= Millie Chissick =

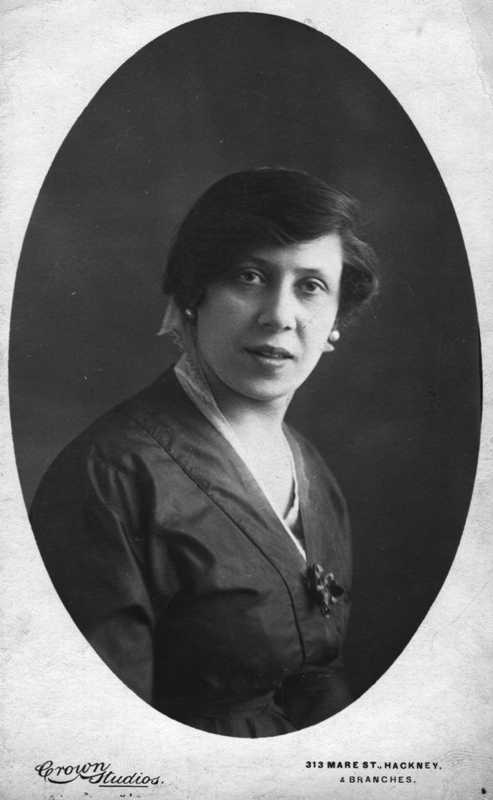
- Portrait of Chissick, c. 1920
- Born: Manya Fierstenfeld c. 1881; Częstochowa, Piotrków Governorate, Congress Poland
- Died: 1975
- Spouse(s): Emanuel Chissick

Millie Chissick (c. 1881– September 1975) was an actress in the Yiddish theatre of Europe.

== Biography ==
She was born Manya Fierstenfeld in Częstochowa, Poland, where her parents ran an inn that was often visited by travelling Yiddish actors. There she met actor Emanuel Chissick. They eloped and she joined his theatre company.

In 1911, Franz Kafka saw Chissick perform in Prague in Abraham Goldfaden's Shulamis and Bar Kokhba. Kafka became infatuated with her, writing in his diary "she reminded me vaguely of hybrid beings like mermaids, sirens, centaurs."

After the Chissick marriage broke up, Millie Chissick emigrated to London in 1914. She performed at the Pavilion Theatre and the Grand Palais, centers of Yiddish theatre in London. Her notable performances include appearing in Louis Golding's Magnolia Street at the Adelphi Theatre. She retired in the 1960s.

Millie Chissick died in September 1975.
