= Cardiff Empire =

Former theatre in Cardiff, Wales

Empire Theatre
- Levino's Hall, Levino's Museum of Varieties, Pavilion Theatre, Empire Palace Theatre, Gaumont Cardiff
- Interactive map of Empire Theatre
- Address: Queen Street; Cardiff; Wales
- Current use: Demolished

Construction
- Opened: 1887
- Closed: 1962
- Rebuilt: 1900, Frank Matcham

The Cardiff Empire Theatre was a theatre, later converted to a cinema, located in the city of Cardiff, Wales.

The theatre was originally built in 1887 by Dolph Levino before it was rebuilt in 1896 by the renowned theatre architect Frank Matcham. The new building suffered an extensive fire in 1899 and was rebuilt again by the following year. Rebuilt as a cinema in 1937, it closed in 1961 and was subsequently demolished in 1962.

== History ==
=== Original theatre ===
On 9 April 1887, Professor Dolph Levino opened Levino's Hall at the site. Levino had previously operated a circus act in nearby Westgate Street which had enjoyed a ten-week run in the city the previous year. Levino himself performed a mesmerism act. He had acquired the site in November 1896 and the hall was built by Fred Martin, who presented Levino with a marble clock upon the hall's opening. Martin later filed for bankruptcy and cited the Hall as a major factor, alleging he lost £3,000 in the venture. The site could accommodate a total of 1,500 people, 800 of which would be situated in the pit. A balcony above the pit provided further areas for spectators and a total of six boxes (three on each side of the building) were also built. Plans for a museum in the opening area of the hall were also proposed. Levino painted several of the areas of the theatre himself, including the proscenium.

At Levino's Hall, the acts at his opening night included a trained dogs and monkeys troupe, a human farmyard and Levino himself with his mesmerism act. In his first year, Levino became embroiled in a dispute with Charles Rodney, the owner of the nearby Philharmonic Music Hall, over the use of music at the site. Rodney claimed that the use of music being played during the show's acts meant Levino's Hall was breaching the terms of its license. Levino claimed that Rodney hired people to cause disturbances during his shows and asked for police protection. The case brought by Rodney was later dismissed under the condition that future acts would not be singing or dancing at the venue.

Levino's acts proved popular and, several months after opening, the theatre was closed in order to undergo "extensive alterations and decorations". It reopened in November 1887 under the new name of Levino's Museum of Varieties. In 1888, the Hall was sold to Oswald Stoll and his mother, Adelaide, on a 999-year lease for £175 per year. The Stolls renamed the Hall the Empire House of Varieties and reapplied for a licence permitting music and dancing at the venue.

=== Empire Palace of Varieties ===
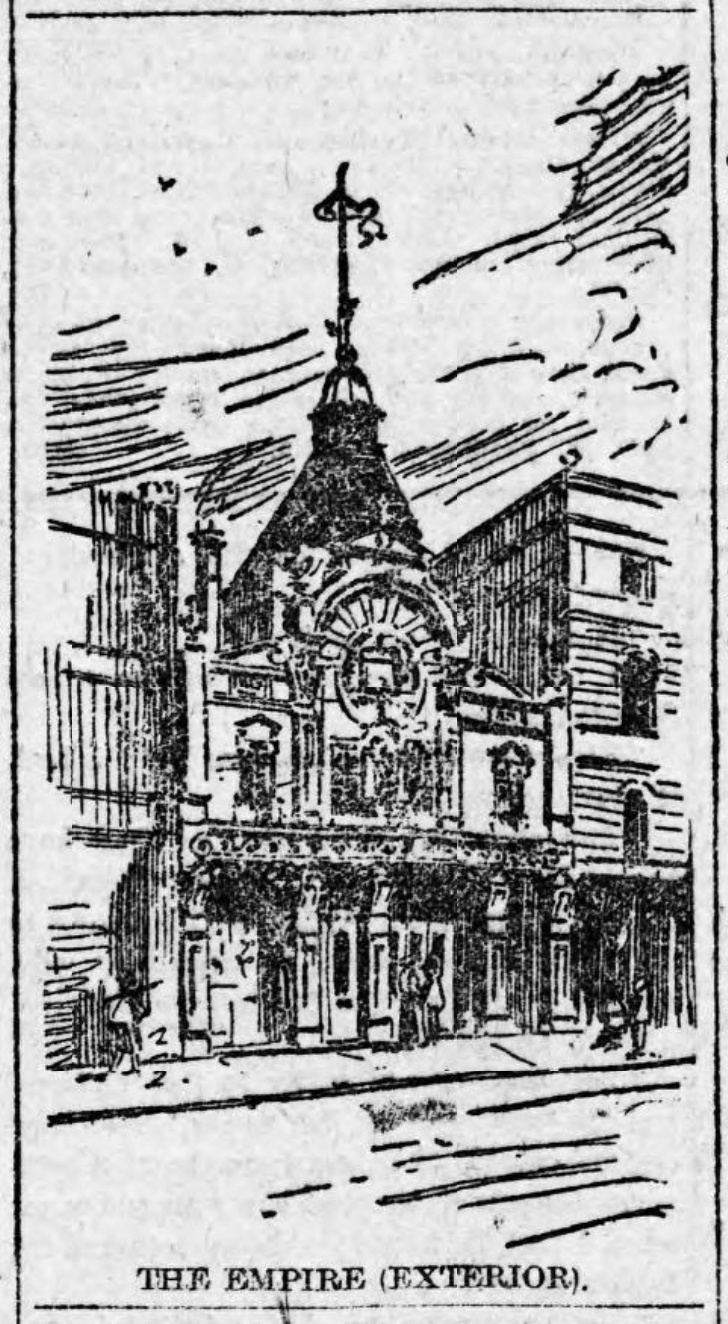
A drawing of the Empire Palace in the Evening Express, 1896

The Stolls enjoyed considerable success at the site and, by 1895, the size of the Hall was deemed insufficient to deal with the demand for tickets. In conjunction with H.E. Moss, he founded a new company, the Cardiff, Newport, and Swansea Empire Palaces Ltd, which subsequently purchased the leases of the Empire theatre in all three cities. At the Cardiff site, the company also purchased an adjacent building and rebuilt the original hall to expanded capacity at a cost of between £22,000-£25,000. The new building was constructed of red brick and Bath stone and featured a tower in the centre of the structure and was designed by Frank Matcham. Part of the redevelopment was aimed at the theatre becoming able to host two performances each night while the building's capacity was extended to accommodate around 2,300 spectators at a time. Matcham's design included a sliding roof to improve ventilation and saw it dubbed "the coolest theatre in the country".

In its first month of opening, a fire broke out in one of the Palace's rooms and prompted an evacuation of the building although the damage was confined to one area. Another fire in 1899 proved significantly more damaging to the Palace, resulting in the building being largely destroyed on 31 October. At the time of the fire, one of the main performers at the Palace was Lottie Collins who estimated that she suffered a loss of £500 in the blaze. Other performers estimated losses of between £20-£100 in equipment.

==== Rebuilt Palace ====
Stoll set about rebuilding the Empire Palace and the new structure, again designed by Matcham, reopened on 30 September 1900. The rebuilt Empire was described as "more elaborate" than its predecessor and the opening night was attended by the Mayor of Cardiff and Samuel Brain. In order to avoid any chance of fire, the new Empire was constructed entirely of steel and concrete and was built with the stage entirely separate from the auditorium. Asbestos was also used around the stage to avoid any fires spreading into the rest of the building. The South Wales Echo described the structure as "the safest place of public entertainment in the town." The overall cost of rebuilding the theatre was estimated to be around £15,000.

=== Later years ===
The theatre was rebuilt again in 1915 and remained in use until 1932 when it was converted into a cinema by the Gaumont British Theatres Corporation. It was closed in 1961 and was demolished the following year.
