= Frank Matcham =

English theatre, music hall architect (1854–1920)

Matcham, c. 1900

Francis Matcham (22 November 1854 – 17 May 1920) was an English architect who specialised in the design of theatres and music halls. He worked extensively in London, predominantly under Moss Empires for whom he designed the Hippodrome in 1900, Hackney Empire (1901), Shepherd's Bush Empire (1903), Coliseum (1904), and Palladium (1910). His last major commission before retirement was the Victoria Palace Theatre in 1911 for the variety magnate Alfred Butt. During his 40-year career, Matcham was responsible for the design and construction of over 90 theatres and the redesign and refurbishment of a further 80 throughout the United Kingdom.

Matcham was born in Newton Abbot, Devon, where he became apprenticed at the age of 14 to the architect George Soudon Bridgman. Matcham moved to London, aged 21, where he joined the architectural practice of J. T. Robinson, who was to become his father-in-law. Under Robinson, Matcham completed his first solo design, the Elephant and Castle Theatre, which opened in June 1879. He took over the business on Robinson's death and continued the designs of various provincial theatres. He formed his own practice, Matcham & Co., in the 1880s and enlisted skilled craftsmen. His first major association came in the 1880s when he was employed to design and refurbish theatres belonging to the Revill family who owned many of the theatres throughout the United Kingdom.

Matcham's most successful period was between 1892 and 1912 when he worked extensively for Moss Empires, a theatre building business headed by Edward Moss and run by Oswald Stoll. Under them, Matcham completed 21 theatres, including five in London, with the rest being in the provinces. Also during this period, although not with Moss Empires, he completed the designs for the Tower Ballroom at Blackpool Tower, Grand Theatre, Blackpool, both in 1894, the County Arcade, Leeds, in 1900, and Buxton Opera House in 1903. The author Iain Mackintosh, writing for the Dictionary of National Biography in 1993, describes Matcham's theatre interiors to be superior when compared to the building's external designs. Matcham's use of cantilevers for the galleries allowed him to discontinue the use of columns, which would otherwise obstruct the audience's view of the stage. The auditorium decorations were often mixed with Tudor strap-work, Louis XIV detail, Anglo-Indian motifs, naval and military insignia, rococo panels, classical statuary, and baroque columns.

Matcham retired to Westcliff-on-Sea, Essex, shortly before the First World War, where he died of a heart attack, brought about by a blood infection, in 1920. His biographer Brian Walker notes from the architect's personal archives that he was "a man of remarkable vigour and had an enthusiasm for life ... he possessed a tranquility of mind and a great sense of humour and fun."

== Early life ==
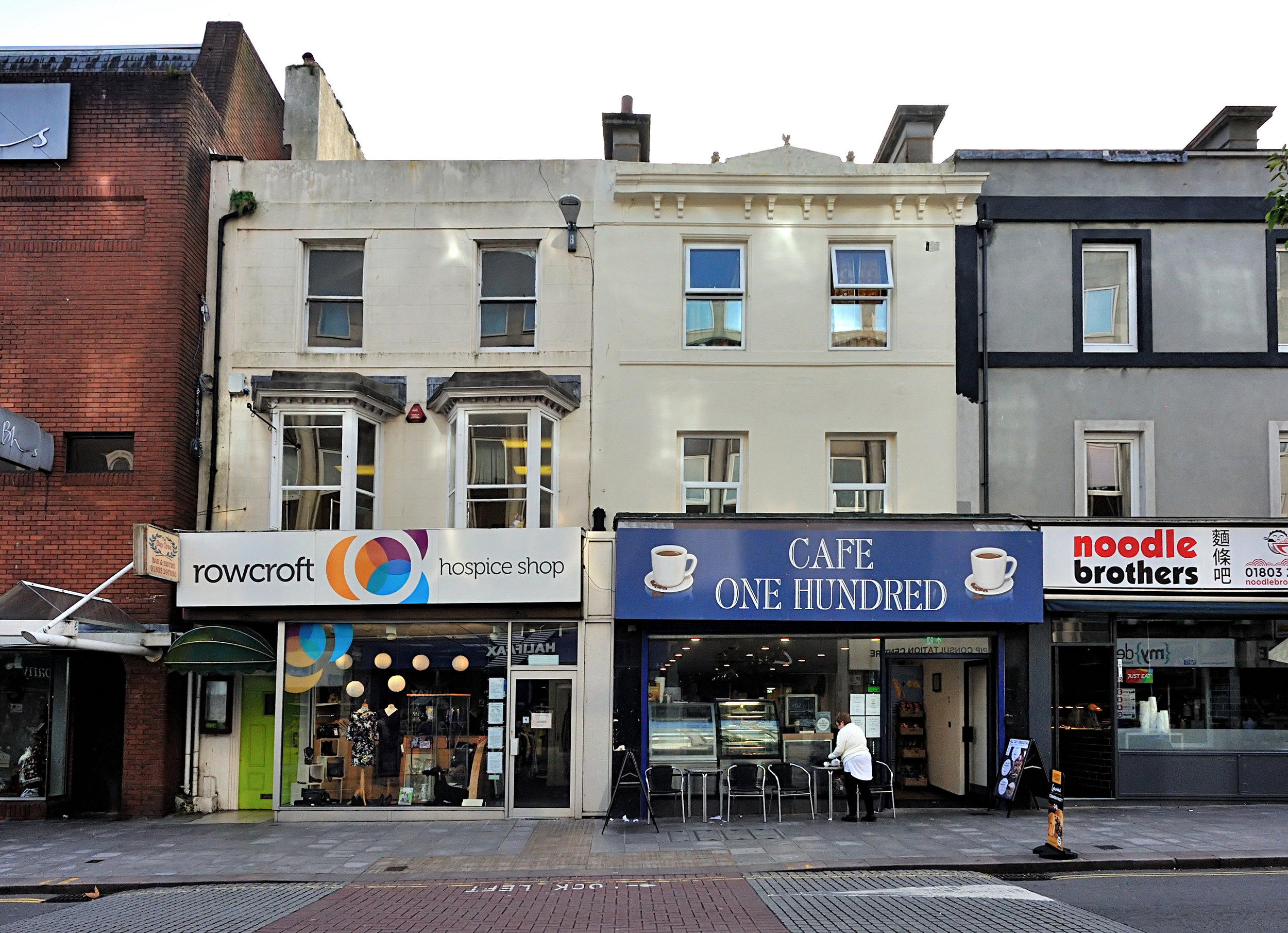
Of the two centre buildings; the Matchams' house in Union Street, Torquay (left), with the Bridgemans' on the right

Francis Matcham was born on 22 November 1854 in Newton Abbot, Devon. He was the second of nine children and the eldest son of Charles Matcham, a brewer, and his wife, Elizabeth (née Lancaster). (Note: Charles Matcham originated from Andover, Hampshire, while Frank's mother, Elizabeth, was born and brought up in Islington, London. They married at St Giles in the Fields, then part of Holborn, Middlesex, in 1850. After briefly settling in Andover, shortly before the birth of the eldest child, Elizabeth, in 1851, the Matchams moved to Torquay owing to Charles's desire to capitalise on the increase in tourism in the seaside town.) In 1857 Charles Matcham moved his family to Union Street, Torquay, and secured a job as a manager of a brewery and a malthouse. Frank was educated at Babbacombe School, in Babbacombe, Torquay.

Matcham showed an early interest in architecture and became apprenticed at the age of 14 to George Soudon Bridgman, a local architect. (Note: George Bridgeman was born in 1839 and was the son of John Bridgeman and Mary née Soudon. Mary Luscombe Bridgeman, John's mother, was the proprietor of the family brewery business at which Charles Matcham worked. The Bridgemans were also neighbours to the Matchams in Union Street, Torquay, and their probable landlords. George first came to notice when at the age of 23, he helped to design a large residential development in the Roundham area of Paignton. George Bridgeman's employers were responsible for the designs of many local buildings including schools, public houses, and municipal structures. Bridgeman went on to form his own successful drawing office, shortly after Matcham left for London. He was later appointed as the chairman of Paignton Urban District Council and became their principal architect responsible for designing many of the buildings that still make up Paignton, including the Palace Avenue development.) The apprenticeship lasted 18 months until Matcham was offered a job at a quantity surveyor's office in London in around 1868. Working in the capital allowed Matcham to study with different architectural professionals. His training under a quantity surveyor taught him how to draw up estimates of cost, interact with building contractors, and introduced him to complex calculations, something which he was unlikely to have been taught at school. He also learnt the importance of working to tight schedules imposed by demanding customers.

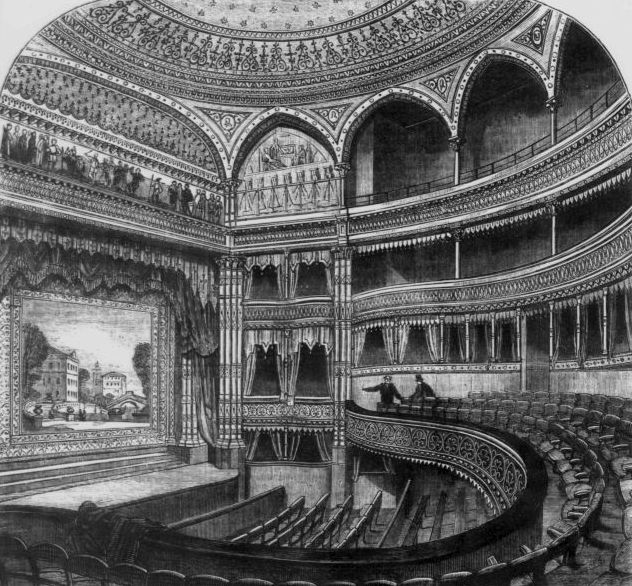
The Gaiety Theatre in the Strand, a building from which Matcham took inspiration as a student

In his spare time, Matcham visited many of London's buildings but took a particular liking to theatres and music halls. A building of special interest to him was the newly completed Gaiety Theatre in the Strand, designed by Charles J. Phipps. Matcham was impressed at Phipps's ability to build a normal-sized theatre on a small, awkward plot, and it is probable that Matcham gained inspiration from the Gaiety in some of his later buildings which were also built on restricted plots of land. It is not known how long Matcham spent in London, although it was not uncommon for an architect to take up to six years to become qualified. The theatre historian Görel Garlick estimates that Matcham spent three years in the capital during this time, which would seem probable as by 1871 Matcham was back in Torquay and again under the guidance of Bridgeman, this time as his chief assistant. Bridgeman was eager to take advantage of Matcham's experience in London and asked him to help on the redesign of the Lyceum Theatre in Torquay.

Isaac Singer, the American businessman, moved from France to Devon in late 1871. His intention was to buy a large property in the English countryside for his family. His attempt at buying Isambard Kingdom Brunel's estate was unsuccessful and instead, he purchased the Fernham Estate, in Torbay, on which Oldway Mansion was eventually built. Singer commissioned Bridgeman's office to undertake the design and instructed that a theatre be built within the house, long since demolished. Garlick considers it entirely possible that Matcham was given responsibility for the design of the theatre because of his educational experiences in London. Singer spared no cost in terms of Oldway Mansion's construction; he sourced the finest materials from around the world and instructed Bridgeman to design the interior in an exuberant French style. Garlick notes that it was highly likely that Singer's exuberance would have influenced someone as architecturally impressionable as Matcham whose later theatres also used extravagant decoration.

=== Entry into the Robinson family business ===
In around 1875, soon after the completion of Singer's house, Matcham secured a job with J. T. Robinson's office in London. (Note: Robinson was a leading theatre architect in Victorian London. His rebuilding of the Old Vic theatre in 1871 was a particularly noted design. Later that decade he became a consulting architect to the Lord Chamberlain of the Household.) The employment allowed Matcham to become more familiar with what Matcham's biographer Brian Mercer Walker calls, "theatre design of a high order". Matcham's time under Robinson was brief; Robinson died unexpectedly at the family home in Bloomsbury Square, London, in 1877, shortly after Matcham's marriage to Robinson's daughter, Maria, on 9 July. Matcham was entrusted by the family to continue with Robinson's designs which included the refurbishment of the Elephant and Castle Theatre, as well as the modifications to the Cambridge Music Hall in Shoreditch.

By the mid-1870s around 137 theatre fires had been reported in the United Kingdom which prompted parliament to create the Metropolis Management and Building Acts Amendment Act 1878 which established safety rules for developers to adhere to. Matcham found the rules to be problematic; because of them, the Elephant and Castle Theatre project had to be extended by six months.

Matcham's designs for the Grand Theatre, Islington

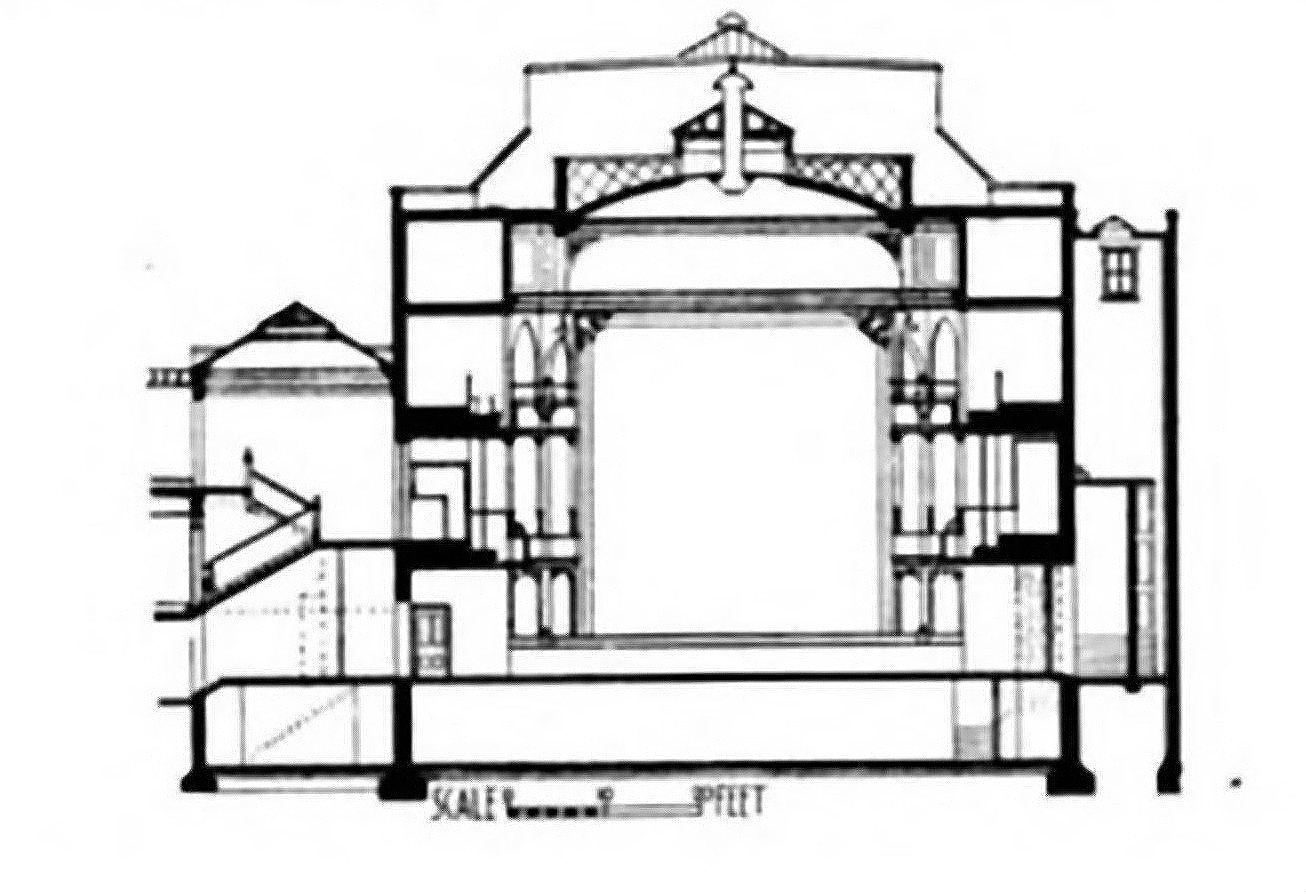
The stage with unobstructed sight lines

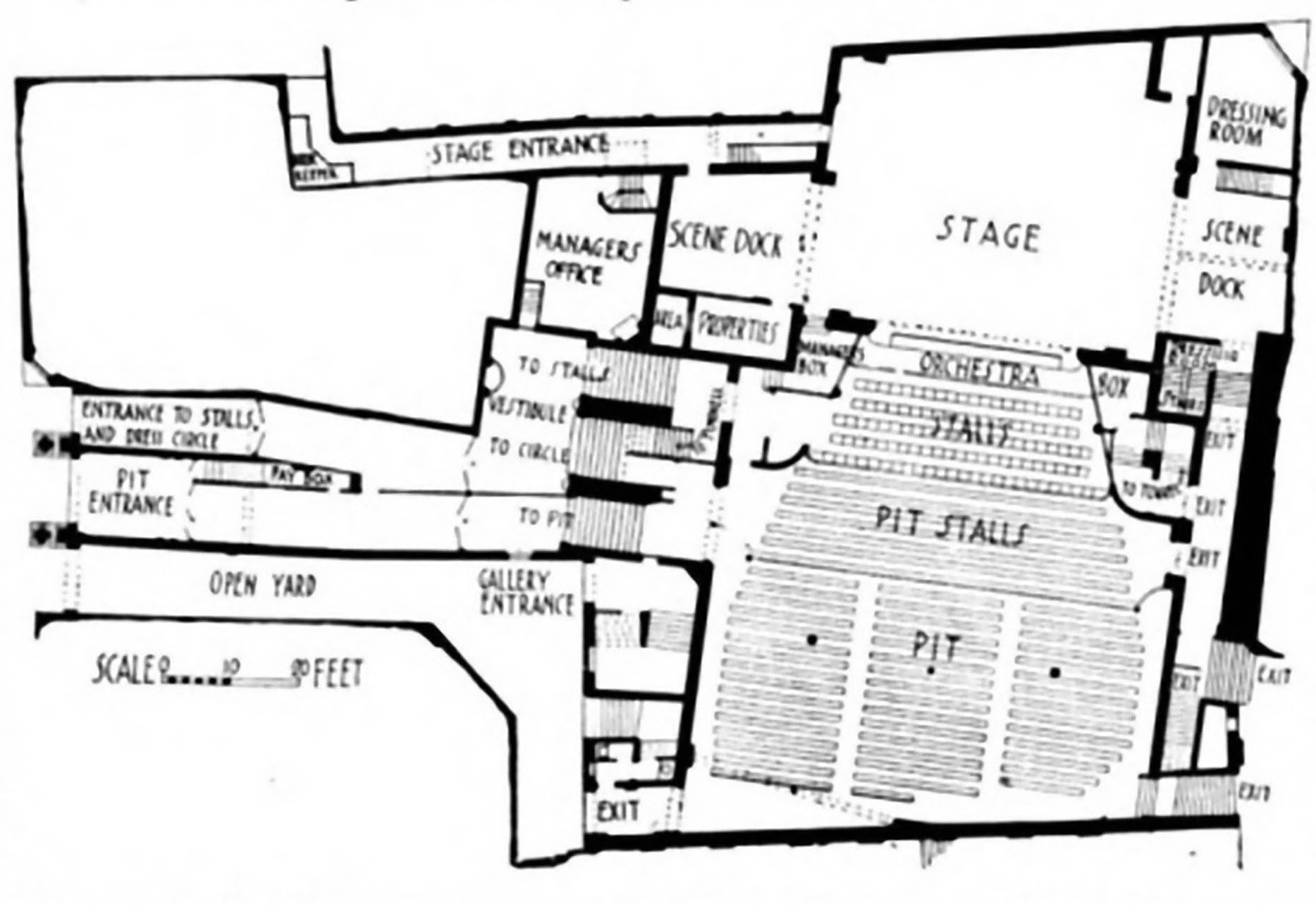
Interior layout

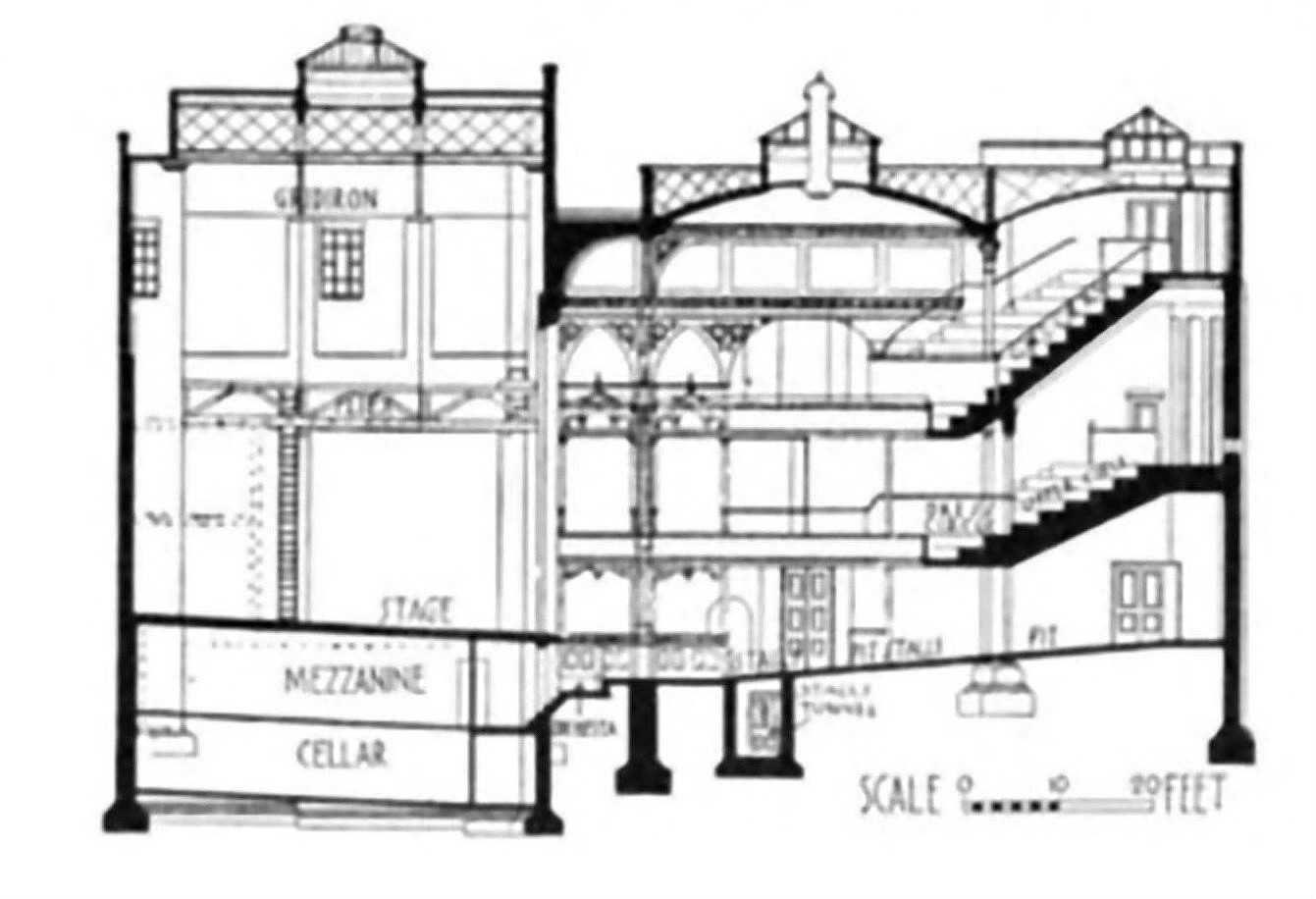
Cross section

In 1882 Matcham took on the redesign of the Grand Theatre, Islington. It was an important project for him: it was the first to be designed using unobstructed sightlines to the stage and was notable for its holding capacity, and prompt construction, something for which he latterly became known in architectural circles. The Grand was revolutionary in its design; it was used as an educational showpiece to amateur architects and it was often visited and commented on by architectural critics and journalists. In one of the three volumes, entitled Modern Opera Houses and Theatres, which were published between 1896 and 1898, the author Edwin Sachs made reference to the Grand's "good sighting and acoustics of the auditorium, economy of space and cost, and rapidity of execution". Matcham's improvement of sightlines were a result of his use of cantilevered steel. This new design allowed for the balconies to protrude into the auditorium without the use of the supporting pillars which increased seating capacity and gave the audience better views of the stage. It was a design that Matcham patented and incorporated into all his future theatrical designs.

The Paragon in Mile End, East London, in 1882, was Matcham's next major project. The design was one of importance, according to Walker, as it showed a great emphasis on the ventilation system—the first of its kind—which used a sun burner in the roof and warm air ducts, 6 feet (1.8 metres) above ground level, which emitted draughts. The builders of the theatre, Crowder and Payne, advertised the venue as being "the best-ventilated theatre in London". It opened in May the following year to much praise for its achievements in audience comfort. The success of the Paragon allowed Matcham to open up his own office in Belfast in 1884.

=== Work under the Revills ===
James Elliston, proprietor of the Theatre Royal and Opera House, Stockport

Outside of London, and prior to 1886, Matcham only had two designs commissioned, both in Glasgow: Hengler's Grand Cirque and the Royalty Theatre. In 1879 he started work on the redesign of the Royalty, a playhouse originally designed by James Thomson and one that had been built on the first floor of a four-storey building. The layout was problematic and Matcham had to make a series of adjustments. To compensate, he designed a ventilation system which involved the installation of an exhaust duct over the auditorium gas light which caused the heat from the burners to rise up and create a movement of air through the theatre. It was a design that he also used on the Gaiety, Matcham's second Glaswegian theatre. The Royalty took just four weeks to complete and was relatively inexpensive, two factors that helped enhance his reputation.

Matcham met the actor and theatrical manager James Elliston in 1886. (Note: James Elliston (1852–1920) was born in Edinburgh. He was known as a hard-working entrepreneur and had a varied career both on and off the stage. He had been based in Blackburn since 1875 but had previously managed theatres in Liverpool, Bishop Auckland, and Durham.) Elliston, a native of Edinburgh, had heard of the architect through his work in Glasgow and commissioned him to reconstruct the side boxes and gallery and to improve the acoustics and ventilation system at his theatre, the Theatre Royal, Blackburn. Through Elliston, Matcham was introduced to William J. Revill, the proprietor of the People's Temperance Hall in Stockport. The Revill family were influential in theatrical circles with their connection to the stage going back to the 18th century.

Revill contracted Matcham to draw up designs for a new building after the hall was destroyed by a fire in 1887. The new building, as with most of the Revill family's theatres, was to be named the Theatre Royal and Opera House; it was completed to schedule the following year. The finished structure was considered to be state of the art by the town's magistrates who granted an entertainments licence that June. (Note: The building was the first purpose-built, stone and brick theatre in Stockport. It introduced the latest designs in ventilation and featured an updated version of gaslighting. The auditorium had a capacity of 3,000 and featured tip-up seats in the dress circle and upholstered chairs in the boxes. Local building contractors were used at a cost of £12,000, a fee paid personally by Revill. The theatre was demolished in 1962.) The Era considered the new building to be "undoubtedly one of the finest theatres in the country". According to the biographer Michael Sell, Matcham's relationship with Elliston helped the young architect to become a nationally recognisable name in theatrical architecture and brought him to the forefront of his profession.

Matcham was commissioned in 1888 by Revill's son, the theatre manager Wallace Revill, to design a new theatre on land he had purchased in St Helens, Lancashire. The new theatre was named the Theatre Royal and Opera House. It was constructed of brick with stone dressings and comprised an orchestra pit, stalls, a dress circle of three rows, an upper circle, which had the unusual feature of its own retiring rooms, and a very large gallery which allowed for unobstructed views. The entrance façade was built in the classical style with three wide bays of giant pilasters. On the theatre's opening night the following year, Elliston called the building "one of the most beautiful theatres [he] had ever seen".

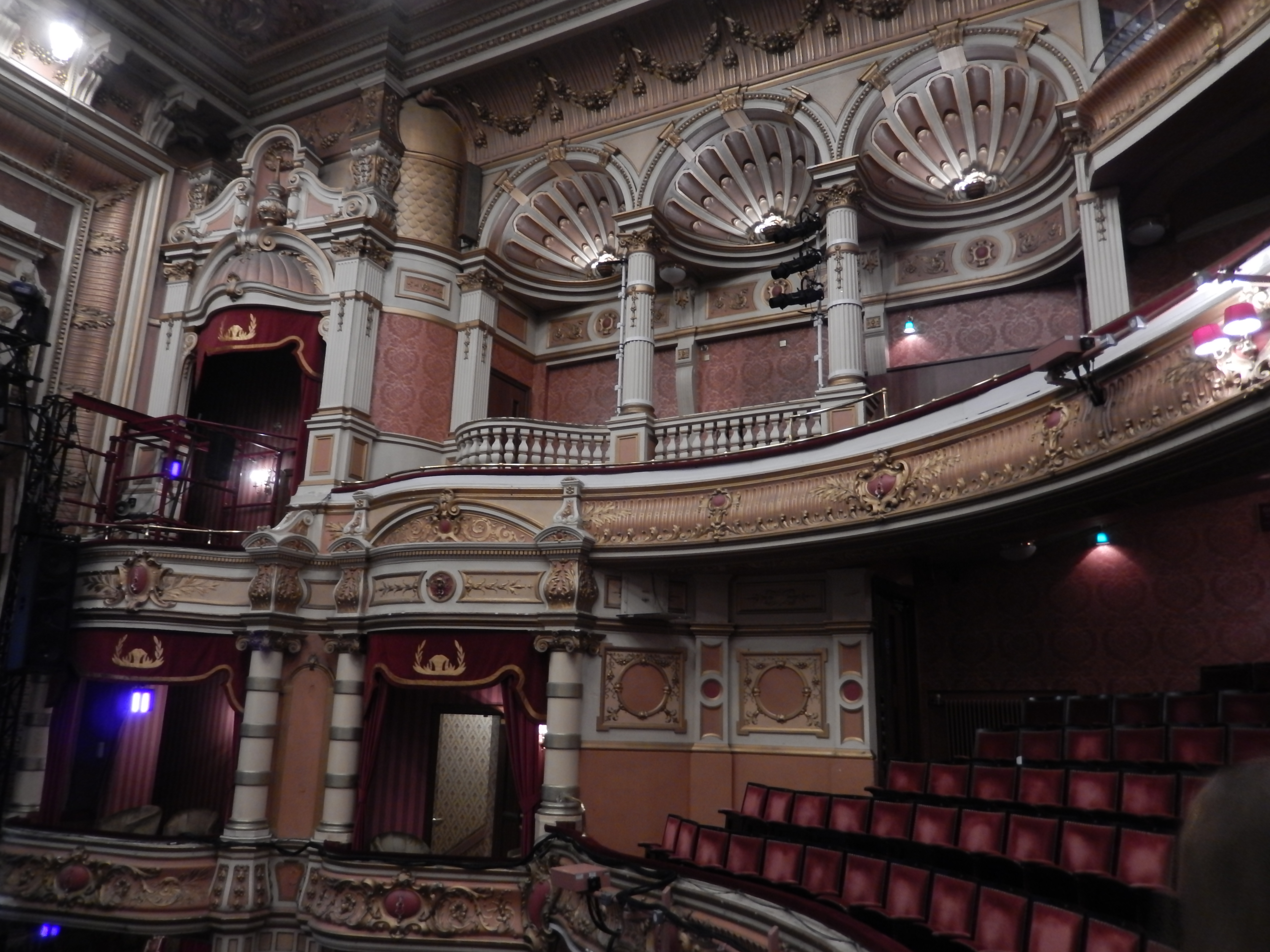
King's Theatre, Glasgow (1904) built for Howard & Wyndham.

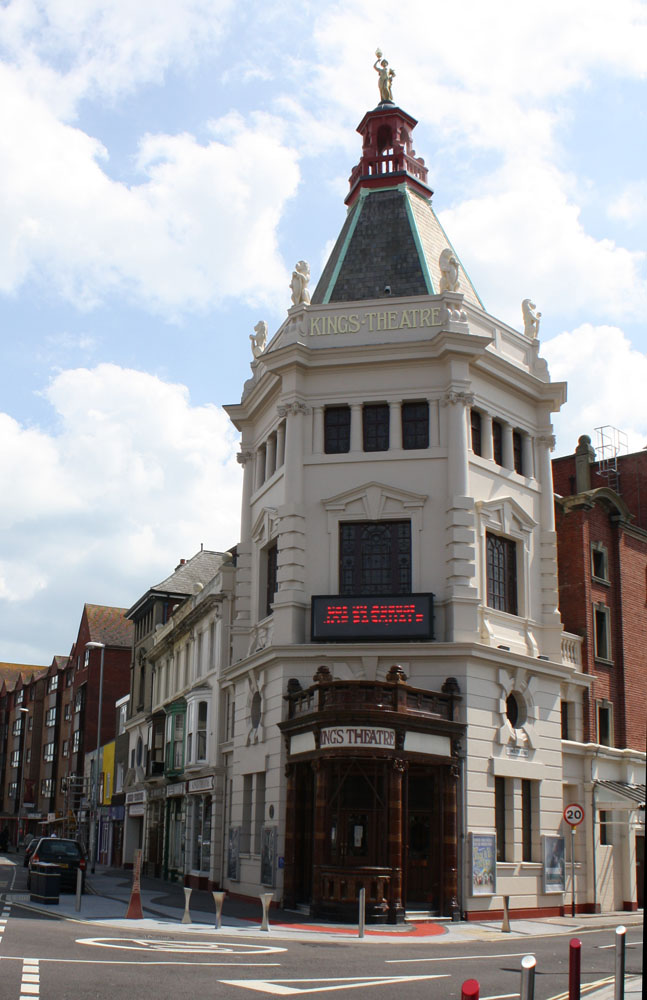
Kings Theatre, Southsea (1907), Matcham's last building for the Revill family.

In addition to the Stockport theatre under Revill, Matcham received another commission from Elliston, this time to rebuild the Theatre Royal and Opera House, in Bolton, which had caught fire on 4 January 1888. Elliston's only requirement was for the building to be completed within a 20-week period, which Matcham honoured. The foundation stone was laid by the actor Henry Irving on 17 October, a month before its opening. Owing to the large numbers of people who died in a similar theatre fire in Exeter the previous year, Matcham improved the safety features, such as fireproofing the ceilings and walls; widening and straightening the staircases; using outwardly opening doors; installing hydrants on each floor; and hanging an automatic, fireproof curtain in the auditorium. The interior was decorated in terracotta and gold tints and the seats covered in crimson upholstery.

Other theatres followed for the Revill family who had by now employed Matcham full-time to work on their projects. Bury and Rochdale, then both in Lancashire, were to get their own Theatre Royal and Opera House with the Rochdale building being a renovation of an existing building. The Bury theatre opened on 26 December 1889 with a pantomime production. The theatre lacked interior decoration as Matcham had been behind schedule. He made a rare appearance, on stage, that night, and assured the audience that during a fortnight's closure he would complete the designs. To compensate for the lateness, he took the unusual step of sub-contracting the auditorium's artwork out to a London-based sculptor. (Note: Particular attention was paid to the roof which was decorated in crimson, green, electric blue and gold. Three large panels over the proscenium and sides of the auditorium depicted scenes of drama, comedy, poetry, and music. There were with life-size carvings of Ludwig van Beethoven, Henry Wadsworth Longfellow and William Shakespeare. Two panels flanked the proscenium, one depicting music, the other, drama.)

The following year Matcham was contracted by Frederick Purcell, a member of the extended Revill family, to undertake the renovations of his theatre that had caught fire the year before. Matcham was afforded the benefit of being able to use the existing building, which increased the possibility of his being able to finish the project on time. The same year, The Grand Cirque and Amphitheatre opened in Bolton. Matcham's design allowed for it to be used as a circus and a theatre and for the venue to be changed between the two in a few hours. It was decorated in the Italian style and had the capacity to seat 3,200 people. The circus ring eventually fell out of favour with audiences and it was covered over.

Purcell took over the family business in 1899 after the death of four of its members but only commissioned a few buildings over the next decade, including the Alexandra Theatre, Stoke Newington. Matcham continued to work with Purcell until around 1908 when the latter decided to wind up the business. Matcham's last design for the family, according to the historian Michael Sell, was the Kings Theatre, Southsea, in 1907. The architecture historian Nikolaus Pevsner called the Kings Theatre "splendid" and described the theatre as having a "prominent hexagonal tower with Ionic columns and lion finials around a broad spire-like top crowned by a cupola with a replica statue of Aurora. The interior is charming and richly detailed, making full use of the tight space. Plaster figures and mouldings in Matcham's full-blown Baroque."

=== Matcham & Co. ===
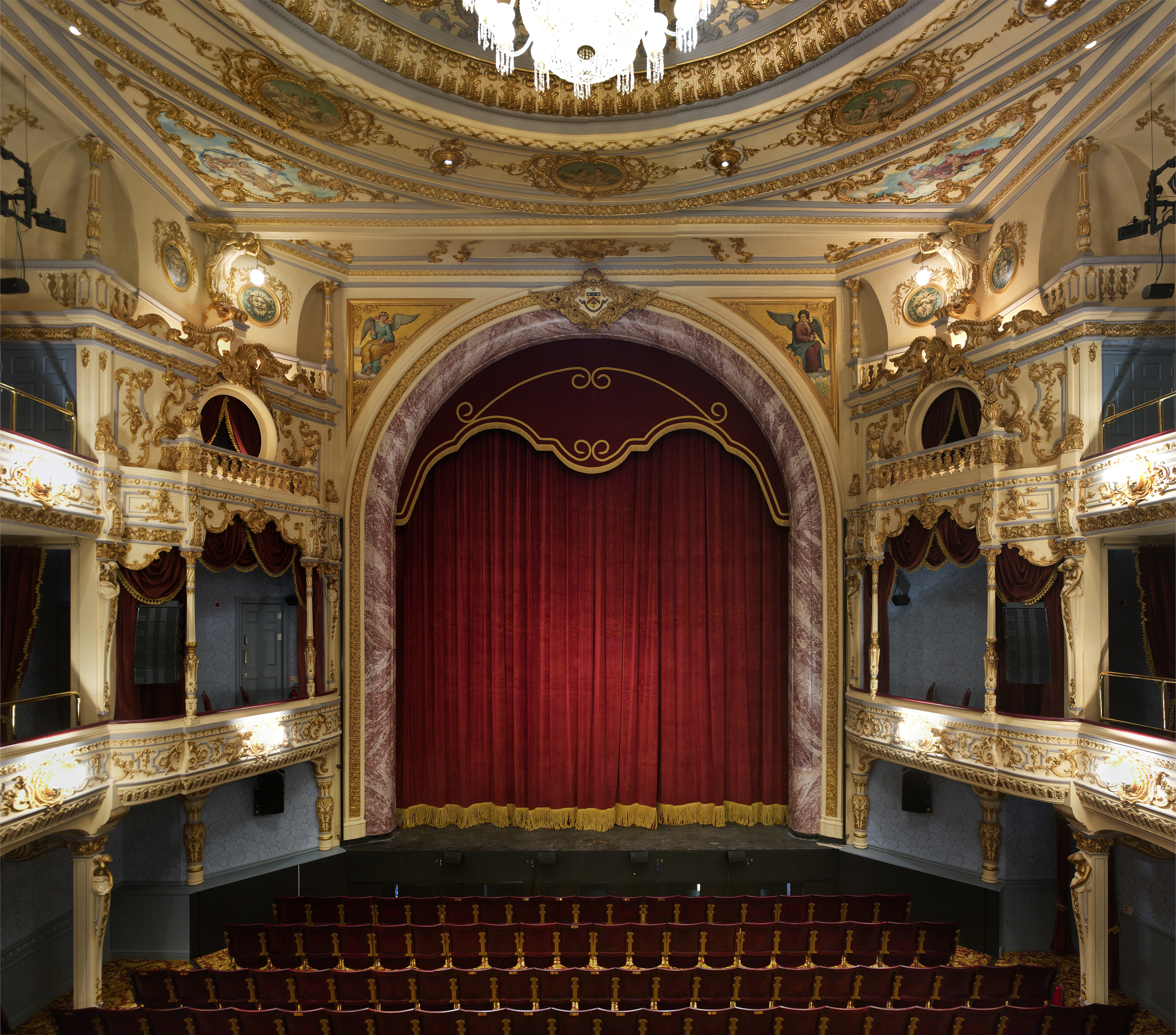
The auditorium at the Everyman Theatre, Cheltenham, opened in 1891, the oldest of Matcham's existing theatres.

The establishment date of Matcham & Co., is unclear; it could originate from when Matcham established his office in Belfast in 1884 after the success of the Paragon Theatre in Mile End, or it could be a renaming of Robinson's business which Matcham took over a decade or so prior to the 1880s. What is known is that it operated out of three offices in Holborn at different times. The first was in Bedford Row, between 1880 and 1886, after which it moved to 3 Great James Street. The business stayed there until 1893 when it moved again, this time to 9 Warwick Court, where it remained until after Matcham's death. It is not known how many staff Matcham employed; he worked with a regular team of assistants and craftsmen, among them, Felix De Jong, an expert in work with fibrous plaster; Jonas Binns, a specialist decorator; and Albert Dean, a master furnisher. During their time in operation, Matcham & Co., completed around 170 theatre designs. (Note: In 1996 around 10,000 original drawings were purchased by the Theatre Museum after they were found in a damaged and damp state. The drawings represented 75 buildings, 35 of which were either wholly or in part attributed to Matcham.) Matcham was assisted in his designs and the running of the business by the engineer R.A. Briggs and F. G. M. Chancellor, an architect. (Note: Francis Graham Moon Chancellor (styled professionally as F.G.M. Chancellor) was born in Tasmania and was the lead architect for Matcham & Co., in Matcham's absence. He was related to the publisher Francis Moon, and Frederic Chancellor, an Essex-based architect and surveyor. Under F. G. M Chancellor, the company's most successful commissions were the new Sadler's Wells Theatre in 1931, and the State Cinema in Grays, Essex, seven years later, which was completed for Frederick's Electric Theatre circuit. Robert Alexander Briggs possessed more of a business mind compared to his colleagues and was an engineer of good standing. He designed the stage machinery for all of Matcham's Hippodromes. He, along with Matcham, purchased the patent for his self-designed cantilever which was specifically used in theatre construction.) Little is known of the working relationship between the three men, only that it was a prosperous one.

== Theatre boom years: 1892–1912 ==
Before variety theatre, music halls were the preferred entertainment of the working-class communities in London and the provinces. Acts including George Robey and Marie Lloyd were deemed "overly racy", according to The Stage, with major theatres banning them in the interests of decency. The restrictions were brief, mainly because of the negative effect such censorship was having on audience numbers. By the 1880s most music halls were either operated by amateur syndicates, who cared less about revenues and more about entertainment, or wealthy, profit-driven businessmen. Safety, in both cases, was frequently compromised, mainly down to cost, so much-needed renovations were often ignored. Music-halls had, for many years, been a hugely profitable business, but had become the subject of stringent regulations and safety controls. By 1880 covert inspections were taking place by local authorities to ensure proprietors were adhering to the safety requirements; the rules were so strict that a lot of the ageing halls, particularly those whose proprietors had little money, were forced to close. Those that remained open were instructed to improve and refurbish their premises to meet expectations. The boom required competent architects who knew how theatres worked. (Note: In Victorian England, theatre architects were not taken seriously in architectural circles and were often looked upon as being of inferior status.)

=== Moss Empires and Oswald Stoll ===
From 1898 to 1910 Oswald Stoll had been the managing director of Moss Empires, a theatrical entertainment circuit headed by the impresario Edward Moss, which at its height was responsible for 33 theatres around Great Britain. Matcham first worked for Moss Empires in 1892 on the Empire Palace, Edinburgh. Moss was so impressed with Matcham's work that he commissioned him to design other provincial theatres over the next seven years. Matcham's work in London under the impresarios included the Hackney Empire, and the Coliseum and Hippodrome theatres, both in Westminster. In total, Matcham was responsible for designing 21 theatres for Moss and Stoll over a 20-year period which ended with the Wood Green Empire, in 1912.

London Coliseum

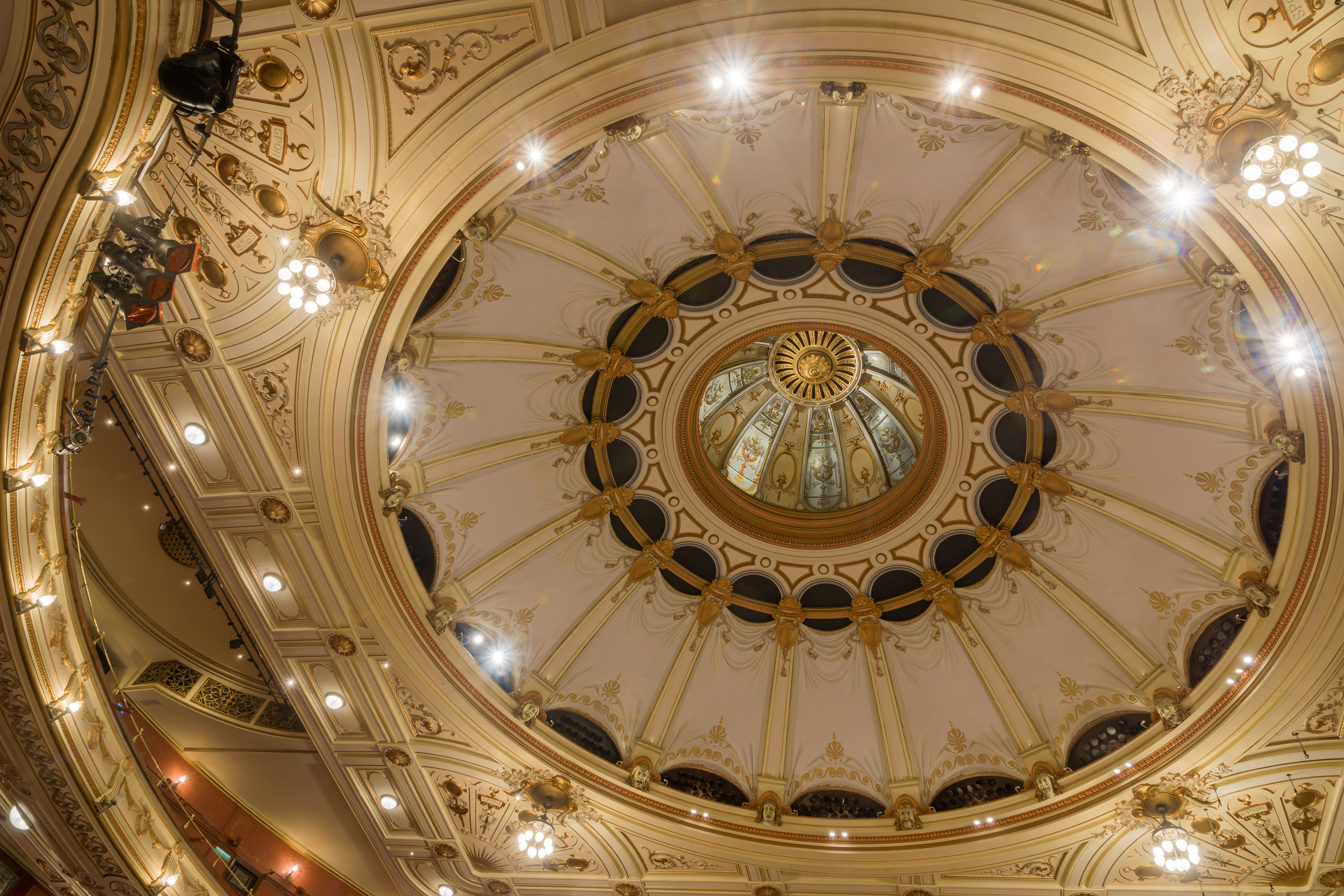
Interior view of the domed roof which helped enhance the sound

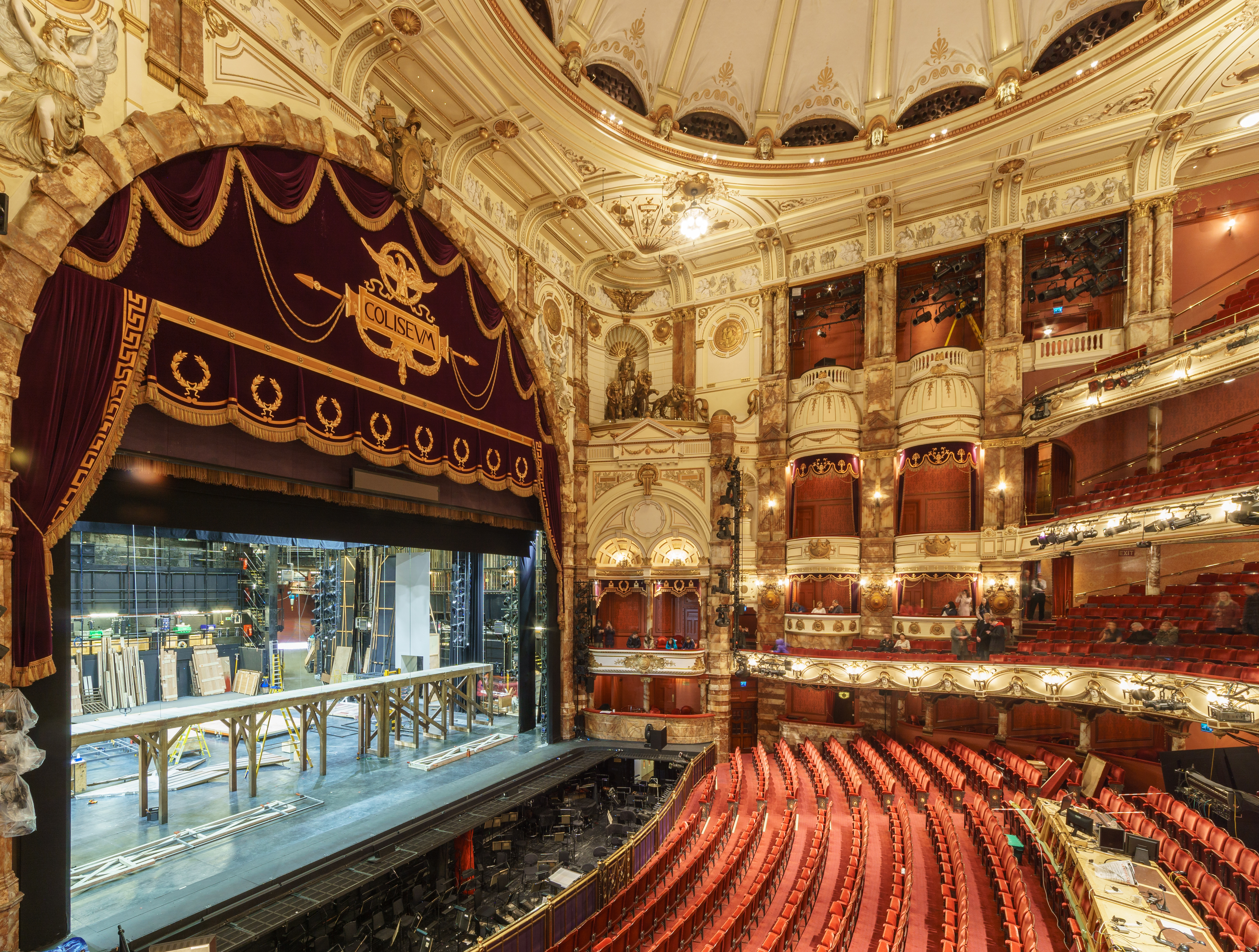
The balconies, which slope towards the auditorium to improve sight lines

Stoll intended the Hackney Empire to be his London headquarters, but the plan changed midway through construction when he decided to locate his offices further into central London: this caused a drastic reduction in the Empire's budget to allow extra finances for the new headquarters at the Coliseum. Matcham rushed together a secondary, cheaper design of the Empire's façade and presented it to Stoll on a piece of scrap tracing paper. The exterior of the Empire was a design that Matcham always loathed but was one, according to the historian Michael Sell, that demonstrated the architect's "seemingly endless powers of invention" and one that will "forever remain a landmark". The auditorium is noted by Historic England as being "one of the most exuberant Matcham interiors in Britain", while the historian Brian Walker called the Empire's interior "the most perfect Matcham interior in Greater London". Pevsner considered the Empire to be "splendidly confident" and "among the best-surviving Edwardian variety theatres".

For the Coliseum, Matcham encountered a problem; Stoll wanted the theatre to be the largest and most lavish in London. Matcham was concerned that the vast size would cause a reduction in sound quality and view to the stage; accordingly, he gave particular attention to the theatre's acoustics and designed the balconies so that they sloped towards the auditorium sides, rather than the more traditional method of being supported by pilotis; Matcham pioneered the use of cantilevered steel in his designs, and took out patents to protect his work. The theatre featured a revolving stage, the first of its kind in London, which allowed for imaginative ideas, including the theatre's extravagant celebrations of Derby Day, featuring guesting jockeys riding real horses, galloping against the moving revolve. Backstage there were, according to Pevsner, "box-to-box telephones" and "changing rooms so that evening dress could be donned on site". The Coliseum cost £250,000 to build.

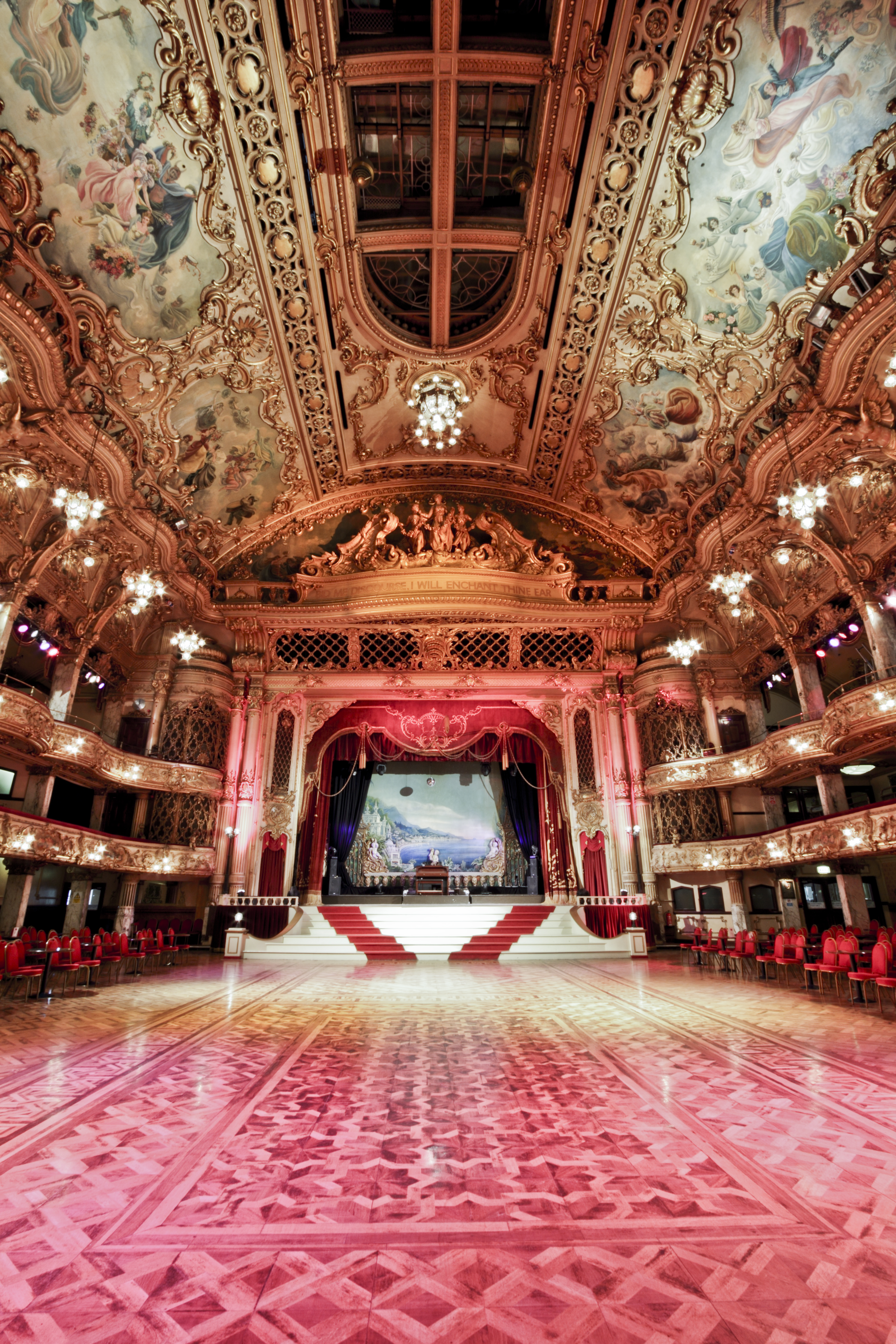
Tower Ballroom, Blackpool, for which Matcham designed the decoration in 1894

What a room. The palette is rich cream, gold and brown. The proscenium is framed by glorious turret-like boxes topped with onion domes, while the top is crowned by enormous figures representing the Three Graces. The Wurlitzer organ faces a backdrop of a romantic seaside scene (wholly unlike Blackpool).

— Nikolaus Pevsner describing the Tower Ballroom, Blackpool, in Lancashire: North, 2009.

Walker called it the "fruit of close collaboration and understanding between client and architect". He further noted: "Matcham's frequently noticed skill in planning is here matched by a different kind of wizardry. Few of his contemporaries could have made so memorable an architectural statement on so short a frontage in such an unpretentious thoroughfare. It is much more impressive than, for example, the neighbouring Garrick Theatre of 1889" According to the theatrical magazine The Stage, Matcham's design provided "a handsome marble staircase, the landmark tower topped by a revolving globe and an impressive range of amenities, including spacious tea-rooms on each floor, lifts to the theatre's upper levels, lavishly decorated retiring rooms, a roof-garden with a glass-domed roof and an information bureau from which messages and telegrams could be sent and where doctors might register their whereabouts in case of emergencies".

== Other works ==
Matcham rarely ventured away from theatres but did so on occasion. He was commissioned by the Blackpool Tower Company, a Standard Contract & Debenture Corporation, to design the decoration for the ballroom, which formed part of their entertainment complex in Blackpool, Lancashire. The ballroom's interior was Matcham's only design for the complex, although Historic England consider it probable that he was also responsible for the remodelling of the circus, also within the complex, in 1900. Pevsner considered the circus to be "the largest and most elaborate theatre of its type in England" and provided the UK with a "permanent setting for a circus not available in any other resort". The complex opened in 1894. The same year, he completed the designs for Grand Theatre, Blackpool.

The regeneration of Briggate in the 1890s, one of the oldest streets in Leeds, included the building of a number of shopping arcades to accompany the existing Thorntons Arcade, completed in 1878. Matcham designed the Cross and County Arcades for the Leeds Estate Company, between 1898 and 1900, at the northernmost part of the street. At the same time as his work on the County Arcade, he designed the Empire Palace, for Moss, which was located further down Briggate. He created two new streets, Queen Victoria Street and King Edward Street, which run between Briggate and Vicar Lane. Matcham's buildings include 49–51 Vicar Lane; 2–24 King Edward Street and 115–120 Briggate, which consists of shops and offices within the County Arcade development. The construction costs of the County Arcade were in excess of £300,000. (Note: The Empire Palace closed on 25 February 1961 and was demolished the following year.) According to Walker, Matcham's biographer, the architect took on the designs for the County Arcade either because of a decline in the need for new theatres, or an attempt to try out something different. Either way, Walker considered the project to be completely out of character for Matcham who had previously displayed such energy and enthusiasm for all his designs.

Together with a few public houses in London, (Note: One of the few existing public houses designed by Matcham is the Crown, which is attached to the London Hippodrome Theatre in Westminster, London.) Matcham's other non-theatrical commissions include a new wing for the Royal Variety Artistes' Benevolent Fund at Brinsworth House and a printing works in Southwark. (Note: The works have since been converted into flats, but the façade remains from the original designs.)

== Retirement and death ==
In 1910 the London Palladium was completed and opened on 26 December. Designs for the Victoria Palace Theatre, for the variety magnate Alfred Butt, were already under way; it opened the following November. During the design stage of the Palace, Matcham was working alongside Bertie Crewe for the new Bristol Hippodrome, which was to become Matcham's last major design. The inter-war period was slow for theatrical architects and builders, mainly because of the introduction of cinema, and many of the theatres that had been designed in Matcham's office were now becoming picture houses. Matcham & Co.'s projects had started to slow down by 1913; that year, the only theatrical venture was the Palace Theatre, in Leicester.

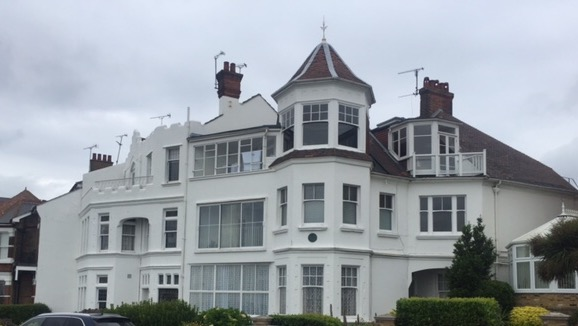
Matcham's house in Westcliff-on-Sea

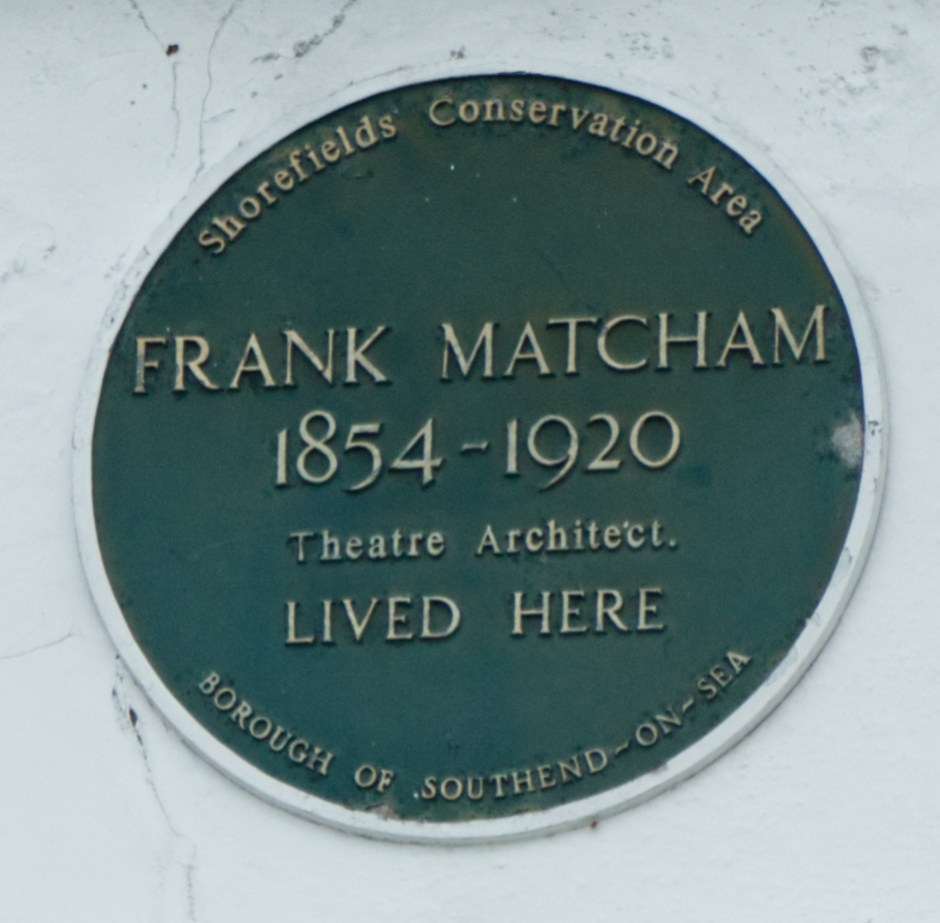
Plaque on the front of his Westcliff house

Matcham retired to Westcliff-on-Sea, Essex with his wife shortly before the First World War and left the running of the business to Chancellor and Briggs. Matcham died at his house, 28 Westcliff Parade, on 17 May 1920. His death was attributed to blood poisoning, brought about from cutting his finger nails too short. The funeral took place at St. Paul's Church, Finchley, before his interment in the family vault in Highgate Cemetery. He left an estate worth £86,389 (£3,340,000 in 2025 adjusted for inflation). Matcham bequeathed his company, equally, to Briggs and Chancellor. A journalist for The Architect newspaper predicted that the business would continue, which it did, although it never achieved the same success as it did under Matcham. Upon the outbreak of the Second World War, Chancellor retired and moved to the countryside, where he died in 1941. Briggs held the business in a dormant state until after the war when it was sold to a property agency in Covent Garden. It continued, on a small scale, until it was eventually wound up in the late 1970s.

== Personal life ==
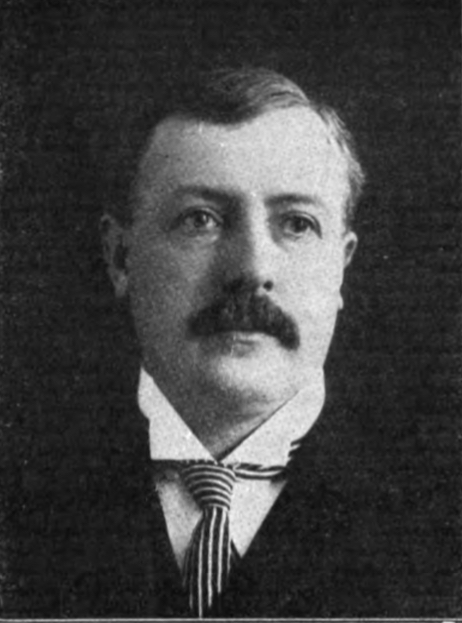
Matcham's younger brother, Charles

Matcham was a devoted if frequently absent husband and father. He married Maria Robinson, the daughter of his tutor, J. T. Robinson, on 9 July 1877 at St. James's Church, Pentonville. (Note: Maria was born in 1858 to Jethro Thomas Robinson and his wife, Hannah née Beedham. Maria initially took her mother's first name at birth, but she went by the name of Maria for most of her life. She died a few months after her husband in 1920.) They had two daughters; Eveline, who was born in 1878, and Constance, in 1884. In an interview with Vanity Fair, Matcham listed an interest in music but admitted that although he owned a Stradivarius violin, he "wasn't particularly good with it". Another hobby was amateur dramatics and the Matchams would perform minor pieces at their address in Dollis Avenue, Finchley, for the entertainment of their neighbours. From a review of Matcham's personal archives, Walker concludes that the architect was "a man of remarkable vigour and enthusiasm for life ... he possessed a tranquility of mind and a great sense of humour and fun."

Of Matcham's eight siblings, two were notable: Charles Matcham (1862–1911) moved to America in 1881 and became a millionaire businessman within the civil engineering industry. His early work for the Bell Telephone Company included the building of the first telephone exchanges in Europe and the introduction of the telephone to St. Petersburg and Riga where he personally installed Alexander II of Russia's phone system. Through his later work, he founded several concrete-making companies and invented a cement stone pulveriser for which he owned the patent. Sydney Matcham (1868–1957) moved to Allentown, Pennsylvania, where he founded the Matcham Travel Bureau, the city's first travel agency.

== Legacy ==
Matcham's theatres were often mocked by architects during the five decades after his death, and little care was taken by local authorities to preserve them during area regeneration programmes, particularly during the 1960s. It was only after 1970 that his buildings were taken seriously and, according to Iain Mackintosh, his genius was widely recognised. In 1995 the Theatre Museum acquired in excess of 7000 of Matcham's drawings. Of these, around 500 are highly finished and represent over seventy-five theatres or cinemas and about one-sixth of his total life's output.

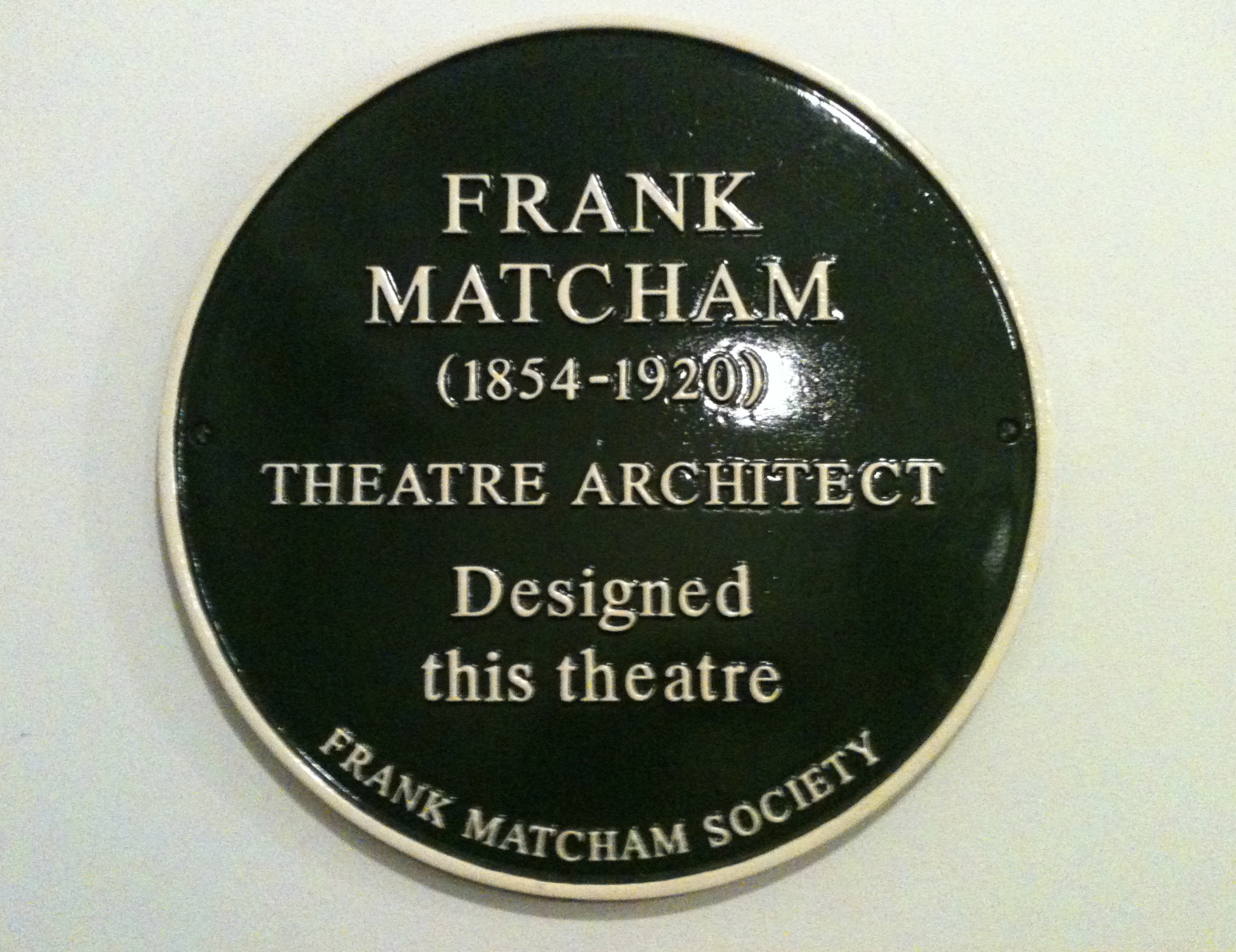
Plaque at the London Coliseum, unveiled by the Frank Matcham Society in 2014

The total number of theatres Matcham designed is unknown and has been the subject of much speculation. The architect Victor Glasstone estimated the architect's work to include 66 new theatres and the remodelling and restoration of 58 others, between 1879 and 1910; Matcham's biographer Brian Walker lists him ahead of his contemporaries and counts 92 designs, with the closest to him being Charles J. Phipps, with 72. According to the theatre historians John Earl and Michael Sell, Matcham was the original architect for half of the 48 surviving theatres associated with him, and the rest he restored, altered or remodelled from existing buildings. A further 111 of his theatres were either bombed during the wars, destroyed by fire, or demolished as part of area regeneration, mostly during the 1960s.

From the start of the 1900s Crewe and W. G. R. Sprague had started to make names for themselves in architectural circles. It has been suggested by various architectural journals that Crewe and Sprague were pupils of Matcham, and although Glasstone was sceptical of this in his 1975 book Victorian and Edwardian Theatres, the author Iain Mackintosh noted a clear Matcham influence in Sprague and Crewe's designs; he describes the former as being suaver compared to Matcham, whilst Crewe, although sharing a lot of Matcham's exuberance, was "more polished" because of his earlier training in Paris. Sir Alfred Butt, writing in The Era, considered: "Frank Matcham lived for his work, and unquestionably was pre-eminent as a theatrical and music hall architect." According to the historians, Roger Dixon and Stefan Muthesius, Matcham was "the most consistent and prolific architect of the later music halls ... his buildings, mostly in the provinces and the suburbs of London, [were] equal or exceed in splendour [compared to] the metropolitan theatres and opera houses."

On 22 November 2007 Matcham was commemorated by English Heritage when a blue plaque was unveiled at his former London home, 10 Haslemere Road, Hornsey, by the actors Timothy West and Prunella Scales.

== Notes and references ==
Notes

== Sources ==
- Baker, Richard Anthony (2014). Auditorium, Acoustics, British Music Hall: An Illustrated History. South Yorkshire: Penn & Sword History. ISBN 978-1-78383-118-0.
- Barron, Michael (2010). Auditorium Acoustics and Architectural Design. London & New York: Spon Press. ISBN 978-0-20387-422-6.
- Bradley, Simon; Pevsner, Nikolaus (2003). London 6: Westminster. The Buildings Of England. New Haven and London: Yale University Press. ISBN 978-0-300-09595-1.
- Cherry, Bridget; Pevsner, Nikolaus (2002). London 4: North. The Buildings Of England. New Haven and London: Yale University Press. ISBN 978-0-300-09653-8.
- Dixon, Roger; Muthesius, Stefan (1985). Victorian Architecture. London: Thames & Hudson. ISBN 978-0-500-20160-2.
- Earl, John (2005). British Theatres and Music Halls. Princes Risborough: Shire Publications. ISBN 978-0-74780-627-1.
- Earl, John; Sell, Michael (2000). The Theatres Trust Guide to British Theatres 1750-1950. London: A. & C. Black. ISBN 978-0-71365-688-6.
- Hartwell, Clare; Pevsner, Nikolaus (2009). Lancashire: North. The Buildings Of England. New Haven and London: Yale University Press. ISBN 978-0-300-12667-9.
- Kilburn, Mike (2004). London's Theatres. London: New Holland. ISBN 978-1-84330-069-4.
- O'Brien, Charles; Bailey, Bruce; Pevsner, Nikolaus; Lloyd, David W. (2018). Hampshire: South. The Buildings Of England. New Haven and London: Yale University Press. ISBN 978-0-300-22503-7.
- Walker, Brian Mercer (1980). Frank Matcham: Theatre Architect. Belfast: Blackstaff Press. ISBN 978-0-85640-231-9.
- Wilmore, David (2008). Frank Matcham & Co. South Yorkshire: Theatreshire Books. ISBN 978-0-95341-271-6.
- Wrathmell, Susan (2005). Leeds. Yale University Press. ISBN 0-300-10736-6.
