= J. T. Robinson =

English architect (1829–1878)

Jethro Thomas Robinson (1829 – 15 July 1878) was an English architect who specialised in theatre design.

== Career ==
Jethro Thomas Robinson was theatre architectural adviser to the lord chamberlain. He was responsible for the 1871 reconstruction of the Pavilion Theatre, Whitechapel, which increased its capacity to 4,000 and the surviving interiors of the Old Vic in London (1872) and the Theatre Royal Margate (1874).

Robinson lived in Haverstock Hill in 1873 and later, 20 Bloomsbury Square in 1877; he died there the following year at the age of 49 having created seven successful theatres in the previous seven years.

Robinson was the father-in-law of architect Frank Matcham, who married the former's daughter, Hannah Maria Robinson (1847/8–1920), on 9 July 1877. Matcham took over Robinson's architectural practice after the latter's death and completed the rebuilding of the Elephant and Castle Theatre, London.
