= Pavilion Theatre, Whitechapel =

Theatre in east London (1827–1856), rebuilt as New Royal Pavilion (until 1935)

Coordinates: 51°31′6.85″N 0°3′48.23″W

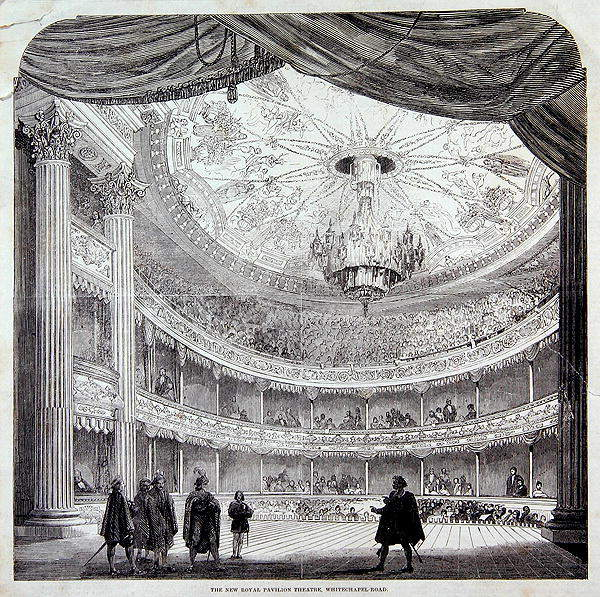
The Pavilion Theatre in 1858

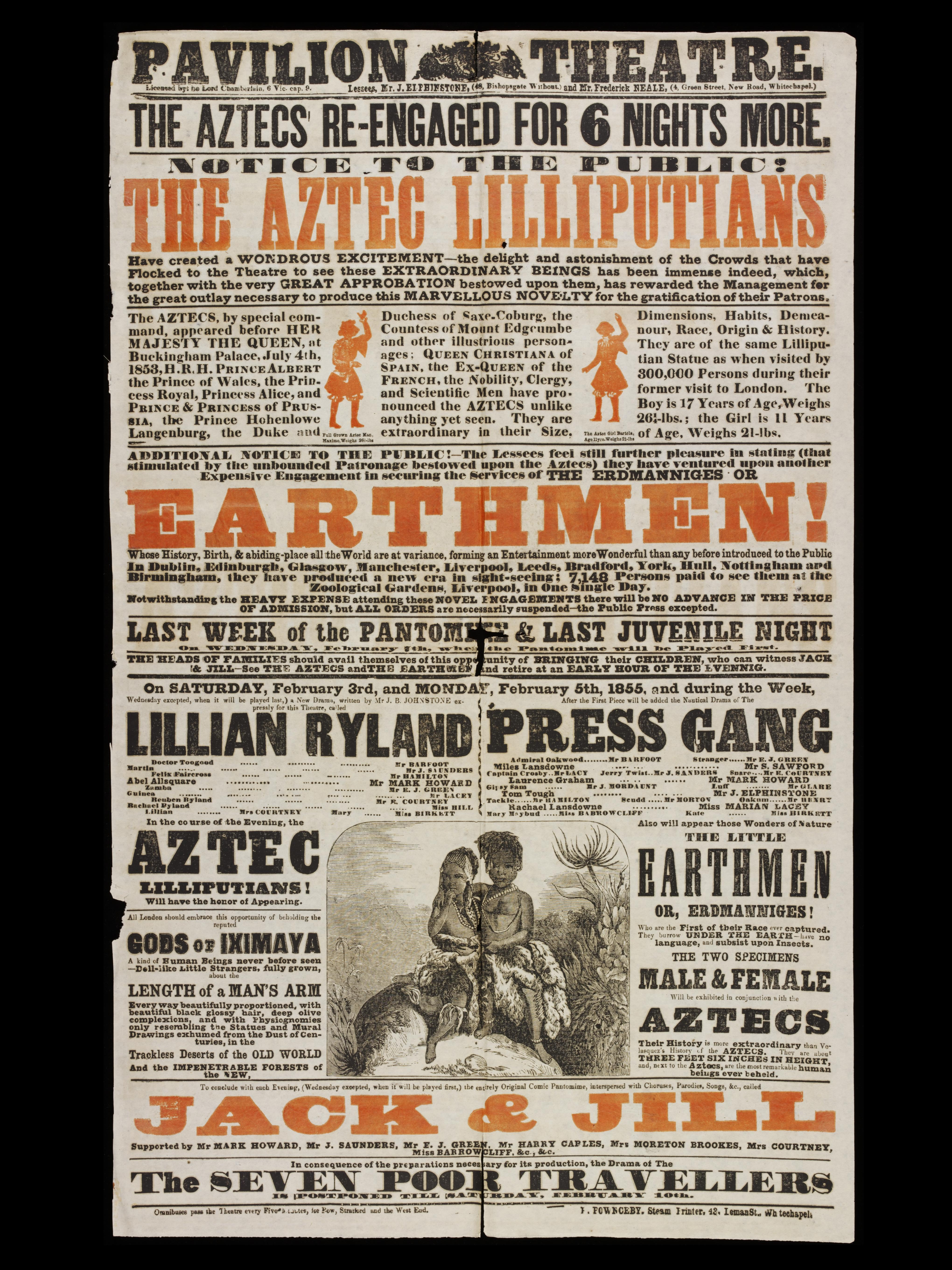
1855 playbill

The Pavilion Theatre at 191–193 Whitechapel Road, London, was the first major theatre to open in London's East End. It was destroyed by fire in 1856 and rebuilt as the New Royal Pavilion Theatre, which operated until 1935.

== History ==
The theatre was opened in 1827 on the site of a former factory, and was the first major theatre to open in London's East End. The first managers were William Wyatt and John Farrell.

A September performance review.

New Royal Pavilion. — We were present at the performances this small and elegant theatre, in Whitechapel-road, a few nights since, and were much gratified. We understand the Manager Mr. Wyatt, who, to cater for the amusement the Public the East, has engaged the celebrated Ching Law Lauro and Signor Spelterini. The eccentricities and wonderful feats of the former were entitled much commendation Spelterini, the Italian Hercules, exhibits some astonishing feats of strength. A new Dramatic Recreation, as it is called the Bills, was performed, in which the performers exerted themselves to the satisfaction of a crowded Audience. Mr. Wyatt, the Manager, was truly comic as Rum Fuskin, a character peculiarly suited to the natural humour which this actor is acknowledged to possess.

A December performance was to lead to a prosecution in January.

ROYAL PAVILION, WHITECHAPEL-ROAD. THIS and every evening during the week, .Mr. W. H. WILLIAMS, from the Theatre Royal, Drury Lane, Coburg, and Sadler’s Wells, will have the honour of delivering his Observations from Real Life, in Four parts under the title of WHIMS and ODDITIES; or, Travels and Trickery". . ~ Parts I. and 11. will consist of a great variety of humorous Recitations, and also the following Songs;—Grandmother's Advice-—The Humours of Vauxhall—Advertisements, or a Wife wanted— Military Muster on the Grand Review Day - Bill's, Birthday—Love and Leathering—The Race Course. Pan III. an entirely new and original Melo-drama, ltd THE POLLY PACKET; or, Life between Decks; in which Mr. Williams will personate Seven different characters and introduce a Song, called ” -My Delight on a Shiny Night.” . Part IV. most beautiful, interesting, and picturesque Representation, invented and produced by Mr. Child of the Adelphi Theatre, called THE PHANTASMAGORIA; which will be portrayed, amongst a variety of interesting scenes, the Appearance of the Flying Dutchman, and the Phantom Ship. To conclude with a grand, Optical, Panoramic Representation of the BAY and BATTLE of NA\ ARINO, and Destruction of the Turkish Fleet, by Admiral Codrington- Explosion of the Turkish Admiral’s Vessel—Situation his Majesty’s Ships the Asia and Genoa, at that perilous moment - Britons Triumphant! ! _ Boxes 4s. Pit 2s. Gallery 1s. The Doors will be opened at a Quarter-past Six, and commence Quarter before Seven o'clock precisely. Second Price at Halt-past Eight.

The advert on 4 January.

ROYAL PAVILION, WHITECHAPEL-ROAD, NOW OPEN.- GREAT SUCCESS. THIS and every EVENING, till further notice, with COOKE's Celebrated Company of EQUESTRIAN ARTISTS, and the Unrivalled Stud of Horses. The WILD INDIAN on his two rapid Steeds.—PAUL PRY and his WIFE on HORSEBACK. The MERRY MILLERS’ FROLIC.—Grand National Review with Twelve Horses.— Superb Display of Fireworks, &c.—Doors open at six, to commence at seven.—Boxes 3s.—Pit 2s.—Gallery 1s. Second Price at half-past Eight.—Boxes 2s.—Pit Is.—Gallery 6d.— Places for the Boxes be taken of Mr. Nodder, at the Box- Office of the Pavilion, from Eleven till Three.— Children to the Boxes 2s.—Pit 1s.

The management were taken to court for not having a licence.

MIDDLESEX SESSIONS. Yesterday these Sessions commenced at Hicks's Hall, before FRANCIS CONST, Esq. and a Bench of Magistrates. THE PAVILION THEATRE. WILLIAM HENRY WILLIAMS, JOHN FARRELL, and WILLIAM WYATT, were indicted for keeping a disorderly house, called the Pavilion Theatre, in Baker's-row, White-chapel. The two first defendants appeared to take their trial, but Mr. Wyatt did not attend. Mr. ALLEY, who appeared for the prosecution, said that the defendants were indicted for keeping what was termed a disorderly house; or, in; other words, for keeping open the Pavilion Theatre, in Baker's-row, Whitechapel, without being duly licensed. An application had been made for a licence, and it was refused; but, notwithstanding, the defendants had chosen to have dramatic representations performed there. The present indictment had been, therefore, preferred against them. . Mr. Adolphus, who appeared for the defendants, said, that he had an objection to submit to the Court against the proceeding, and which he thought would stop the case. The offence, if any had been committed, was against the Statute of 25th George II. The defendants had, however, been indicted under the Common Law for keeping a disorderly house. The Common Law could not reach such theatrical amusements as those complained of, and therefore the Statute of 25 Geo. II. had been passed. The keeping the Theatre open was clearly an offence against that Statute, but not an offence against the Common Law. He therefore submitted, that as the proceedings were irregular, the defendants must be acquitted. The CHAIRMAN, however, said, that he was not aware what evidence Mr. Alley intended to call, or whether he could prove that the house was disorderly and riotous. He should, therefore allow the case to proceed. Mr. ALLEY then re-stated the substance of the indictment, and observed, that as the Pavilion had not been licensed, the defendants had violated the law by causing any performances or exhibition to take place within the building. He should prove that money had been taken at the doors for the admission of the public - that music and singing were introduced in the course of the performances and that Mr. Williams, one of the defend. ants, had exhibited in character on the stage. Who were the actual proprietors of the place he knew not. It once belonged to the defendants, and he believed that they had assigned it to other persons. It was, however, loudly complained of by the neighbours, who were anxious to abate the nuisance. CHAIRMAN: If that is all you call prove it will not do. MR. ALLEY said he should prove that Mr. Williams had exhibited himself there. The CHAIRMAN said, that before the Statute was passed, Singing and dancing, and other species of amusements, took place in gardens and houses, and various other places, and created much riot and tumult in the Metropolis. To put an end to that which was considered a nuisance the Statute was passed, and persons were forbidden to make such exhibitions unless they were duly licensed. That was the Act, therefore, upon which the indictment against the defendants ought to have been founded. The Common Law did not extend to farces and dramatic representations. Mr. ALLEY said, that the Act upon which the defendants had been indicted did not extend to dramatic representations, but it included singing, dancing, or anything of the like kind; and upon reference to the bills of performance, it would be found that singing and dancing were part of the amusements. In the bills, it was stated that it was proposed " to exhibit manners and things as they are; tricks and oddities; songs; and the Polly Packet, or Life between Decks." Mr. ADOLPHUS observed, that he thought it was intended as a course of Lectural and Miscellaneous Entertainments. Mr. ALLEY: Oh, no; the third part is the Phantasmagoria. Mr. ADOLPHUS: Phantasmagoria is clearly nothing more than a Philosophical Entertainment. Mr. ALLEY said, that the representation of Phantasmagoria had always been held as illegal in a place of amusement. He had recollected some years ago, when it was performed in the Strand that the Trumpeter's license was brought forward, but that was not considered as an answer to the charge. Some further conversation took place, but the CHAIRMAN having expressed his opinion that the defendants could not be convicted upon the present indictment, a verdict of Not Guilty was recorded.

The advert on 10 January.

GREAT NOVELTY! ! At the ROVAL PAVILION. WHITECHAPEL-ROAD. THIS and every EVENING during the Week, M Dupont will make his appearance on Two, Three, Four and Six Horses! as performed at the Royal Gardens, Vauxhall. Miss Powell and Master Bridges will exhibit their Evolutions on the Double Tight Rope. After which Miss Powell will introduce her Inimitable Performances on the Elastic Cord; which will be followed by Mr. Furlong's wonderful Exhibition on One Horse at full speed and M. Dupont’s surprising Metamorphosis, changing from the Original Character, and introducing the Fashions of Paris, performed originally at the Circus Olympic in Paris. Also the Astonishing Appearance of the Clown and his GRANDMOTHER, aged 102., on a Single Horse, Horse carrying the Clown on her Back at the same time. For further Particulars see Hand-bills. Good Fires constantly kept the Pavilion. Doors open Six, and commence at Seven. Prices of Admission, Boxes 3s. Pit 2s. Gallery 1s. Second Price Half-past Eight, the Boxes, Pit, and Gallery only. Cooke respectfully informs the Public, that he has appropriated one part of the Pavilion for the accommodation of all Classes as a Standing Place; the Admission to that part the House 6d. only. No Half-price to the Standing Place.

Alberti, or, the Mines of India by Elizabeth Polack was performed on 10 May 1834. Another Polack play Esther the Royal Jewess, or the Death of Haman, with a story taken from the Old Testament, and considered in its time to be a type of an "Exotic East" melodrama, was successfully produced in 1835.

The first Pavilion Theatre was entirely destroyed by fire on 13 February 1856 It was rebuilt in 1858 as the New Royal Pavilion Theatre, with a capacity of 3,500. It was further reconstructed in 1871 by the architect J. T. Robinson, and the capacity increased to 4,000. Charles Dickens, Jr. (eldest child of Charles Dickens), in his 1879 book Dickens's Dictionary of London, described the Pavilion this way: "A large East-end theatre capable of holding considerably over 3,000 persons. Melodrama of a rough type, farce, pantomime, &c."

In the early 20th century it became the home of Yiddish theatre, catering to the large Jewish population of the area, and gave birth to the Anglo-Jewish 'Whitechapel Boys' avant-garde literary and artistic movement.

In later years, it operated under the names, Royal Clarence Theatre, Eastern Opera House, and New Royal Pavilion Theatre, continuing in business until 1935. The building was demolished in 1962.
