= Charles Matcham =

American based English businessman (1862–1911)

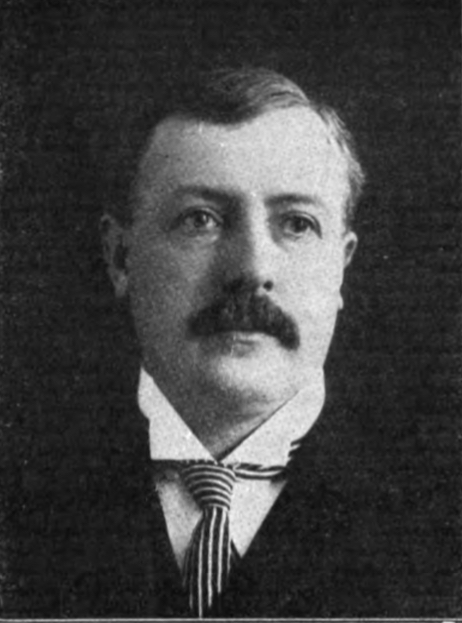
Charles Matcham, c.1911

Charles Arthur Matcham (15 January 1862 – 22 September 1911) was an English civil engineer and businessman who spent most of his life in America. He founded numerous businesses, mostly within the cement-making industry, in areas including Phillipsburg, in New Jersey, and Allentown, and Portland in Pennsylvania. He was the younger brother of the English theatre architect Frank Matcham.

== Life and career ==
Charles Matcham was born on 15 January 1862 in Torquay, Devonshire. He was the third son of Charles Matcham (1826–1888), a brewer, and his wife, Elizabeth née Lancaster (1830–1905). (Note: Charles Matcham Sr. originated from Andover in Hampshire; his wife, Elizabeth, was born and brought up in Islington, London. They married at St Giles in the Fields, then part of Holborn, Middlesex, in 1850. After briefly settling in Andover, shortly before the birth of the eldest child, Elizabeth, in 1851, the Matchams moved to Torquay owing to Charles's desire to capitalise on the increase in tourism in the seaside town.) Charles Jr. was educated at schools in Hambledon in Hampshire, and then Brighton, East Sussex.

Matcham entered the engineering industry in 1875 in London where he received an honours mention for his mechanical drawing and designs at the National Art Training School in South Kensington. From 1877–80 he worked as a mechanical draftsman in London. In 1879 he joined the newly-formed American Bell Telephone Company and built telephone exchanges in Europe, including Antwerp, Brussels, and Charleroi. He also worked in St. Petersburg and Riga, where he introduced the newly-invented telephone and installed the Alexander II of Russia's system, personally.

In 1881 Matcham travelled to Chicago, America, where he started work with the Chicago Telephone Company for whom he built exchanges. Three years later he joined the Pennsylvania Telephone Company and became the Chief Engineer and Superintendent. In 1890, along with his brother-in-law, he founded a cement plant in Phillipsburg, New Jersey, called the Whittaker Cement Company. He stayed with the business until its sale in 1897 to the Alpha Portland Cement Company, of which he was manager. That year he established the Lehigh Portland Cement Company where he stayed for 10 years before joining the Allentown Cement Company as general manager. He was a member of the American Society of Civil Engineers, American Institute of Mining Engineers, American Society for Testing Materials, and the National Geographic Society. Through his work within the civil engineering industry, he invented a cement stone pulveriser, for which he owned the patent.

== Illness and death ==
Matcham retired in 1910 after failing health. He died of a chest infection on 22 September 1911 at the age of 49.

== Personal life ==
Matcham married Margaret née Ormrod in 1888 and they had three children; a son, Charles, (Note: Charles O. Matcham graduated from Yale University and relocated to California where he became a prominent architect in Los Angeles.) and daughters Dorothy and Catherine. He was the younger brother of the theatre architect Frank Matcham, and Sydney, who was noted for founding the first travel agency in Allentown, called the Matcham Travel Bureau.

== Notes and references ==
Notes

== Sources ==
- "Memoir of Charles Arthur Matcham". Transactions of the American Society of Civil Engineers. LXXIV. New York: 513–514. December 1911.
