= Edward Moss (impresario) =

British theatre impresario (1852 - 1912)

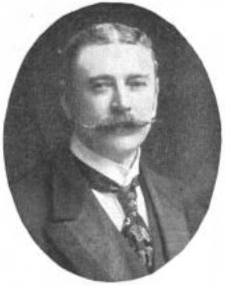
In The Sketch, 17 January 1900.

Sir Horace Edward Moss (12 April 1852 – 25 November 1912) was a Scottish theatre impresario and the founder chairman and joint managing director of the Moss Empires Ltd theatre combine which he created in 1899, and floated on the Stock Exchange, after first joining forces with Richard Thornton of Newcastle and later with Oswald Stoll then operating in Wales. From its start and during the 20th century, Moss Empires remained the largest group of variety theatres in Britain, with over 50 venues at its height, and was regarded as the largest in the world. It was he who, in 1904, introduced a "four shows a day" system at some of his theatres; he was also the first to allow advance booking of seats in a music hall.

== Career and management ==
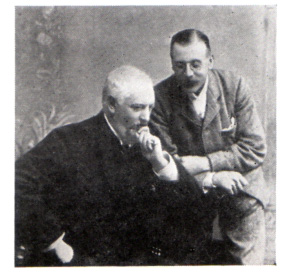
Edward Moss standing, and Richard Thornton seated.

H. E. Moss, known as Ted to family and friends, was born in Droylsden, Lancashire, the son of James and Martha Moss. His father James Moss was a fiddler and character singer in singing saloons. He was educated in Edinburgh and Glasgow, where he received his own musical training. In 1872, he became the pianist and manager of his father's Lorne Music Hall in Greenock, Scotland, moving on in 1877 to Edinburgh where he tried a number of ventures including its Gaiety Music Hall and renaming it Moss's Theatre of Varieties. For 27 years, he presented the Annual Carnival at Waverley Market. He bought a new site and opened his first Empire Palace Theatre in 1892, designed by Frank Matcham who designed many of the group's theatres, as did Bertie Crewe. He was knighted in 1905 for his services to charity and entertainment, the first variety impresario to be honoured this way.

King George V commanded a public Royal Variety Performance to be directed by Sir Edward and held in the Edinburgh Empire in July 1911 as part of the Coronation celebrations that year. This would be the first such production in Britain, confirming the new respectability of Music Hall. However the theatre burned down a few months before the Performance, and Sir Edward's health deteriorated. Instead, a Royal Variety Performance was arranged for the following year, being held in the Palace Theatre, London, under Alfred Butt.

== Early theatres ==
In 1905 the Moss combine had 37 variety theatres of which the flagship was London Hippodrome. The company advertised its list as follows:-

London Hippodrome, Empire Glasgow, Empire Edinburgh, Empire Newcastle, Empire Leeds, Empire Bradford, Empire Sheffield, Empire Birmingham, Empire Liverpool, Empire Cardiff, Empire Swansea, Empire Newport, Empire Nottingham, Empire Ardwick, Manchester, Empire South Shields, Empire Hackney, London, Empire Holloway, London, Empire New Cross, London, Empire Stratford, London, Empire Shepherd's Bush, London, Empire Dublin, Empire Belfast, Empire Coventry, Empire Sunderland, Palace Hull, Palace Leicester, Palace Bordesley, Palace Camberwell, Granville Walham Green, Manchester Hippodrome, Glasgow Coliseum, Olympia Liverpool, HM Theatre of Varieties Walsall, Reading Theatre, Richmond Theatre, Philharmonic Hall Cardiff, Zoo and Hippodrome Glasgow.

== Personal life ==
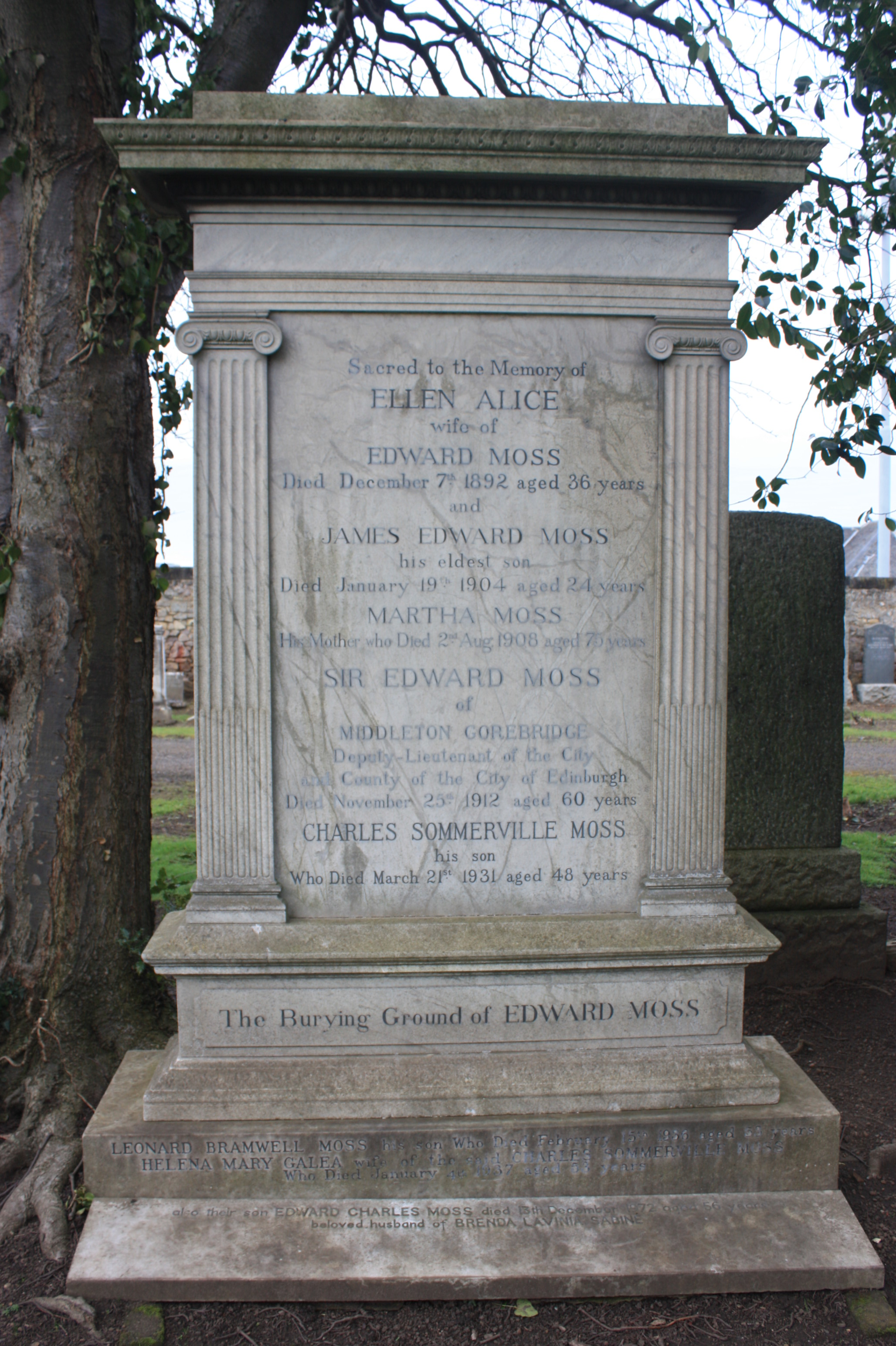
The grave of Sir Edward Moss, Portobello Cemetery, Edinburgh.

He married twice: firstly, to Ellen Alice Bramwell (1856–1892), with whom he had two sons: James Edward Moss (1880–1904), and Charles Sommerville Moss (1883–1931). On Ellen's death he married Florence Nellie (Penelope) Craig. He and Florence had one daughter, Binky.

He died on 25 November 1912 at his mansion and estate of Middleton Hall, Gorebridge, near Edinburgh, and is buried in Portobello Cemetery in eastern Edinburgh, close to the cemetery entrance. Sir Edward was succeeded by Frank Allen as chairman and managing director of Moss Empires Ltd.
