= Oswald Stoll =

Australian-born British theatre manager (1866–1942)

Sir Oswald Stoll
- Born: Oswald Gray; 20 January 1866; Melbourne, Australia
- Died: 9 January 1942 (aged 75); Putney, England
- Burial place: Putney Vale Cemetery
- Occupations: Theatre manager and impresario, film company owner
- Spouses: Harriet Lewis (m. 1892; died 1902) Millicent Shaw (m. 1903)

Sir Oswald Stoll (né Gray; 20 January 1866 – 9 January 1942) was an Australian-born British theatre impresario and manager and the co-founder of the Stoll Moss Group theatre company. He also owned Cricklewood Studios and film production company Stoll Pictures, which was one of the leading British studios of the silent era. In 1912, he founded the Royal Variety Performance (originally Royal Command Performance) a now-annual charity show which benefits the Entertainment Artistes' Benevolent Fund.

== Biography ==
=== Early life ===
Stoll was born in Melbourne, Australia as Oswald Gray. He moved to England with his mother, Adelaide McConnell Gray after the death of his father James Oswald Gray. When his mother remarried, he took his stepfather's last name, Stoll.

=== Entertainment career ===
==== Theatre management ====
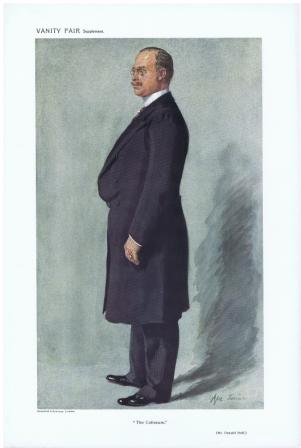
Caricature of Oswald Stoll by "Ape Jr" in Vanity Fair, 4 January 1911

At a young age, Stoll left school to help his mother, Adelaide, manage first the Parthenon music hall in Liverpool, and later a regional theatre company. The company was a success, and Stoll began to buy or build city theatres. The theatre business made Stoll a wealthy man, and in 1898 he merged his business with that of competitor Edward Moss, to form Moss Empires. By 1905, almost every large town in Britain had an "Empire" or a "Coliseum" theatre, managed by Stoll. He continued to honour the roots of his business by installing his mother in each new box office, so she could take the first ticket sale.

==== Royal Variety Performance ====
Beginning with the first event in 1912, and continuing until 1926, Stoll was instrumental in presenting the Royal Variety Performance (originally Royal Command Performance) a now-annual charity show benefiting the Entertainment Artistes' Benevolent Fund.

==== Film production ====
His film company Stoll Picture Productions was founded in April 1918, and acquired a one-stage studio in Surbiton which the company retained until 1923. A former aeroplane factory in Cricklewood was purchased in 1920 and converted to film use as Cricklewood Studios. Particularly associated with director Maurice Elvey, Stoll's company maintained a connection with the film industry until 1938 when the Cricklewood studio was closed.

==== Theatre architecture ====
Stoll worked with the theatre architect Frank Matcham on several theatres, including:

- Nottingham Palace (1898)
- Hackney Empire (1901)
- Shepherd's Bush Empire (1903)
- London Coliseum (1904)
- Bristol Hippodrome (1912)
- Chiswick Empire (1912)

=== Sir Oswald Stoll Foundation ===
Stoll was a philanthropist who donated the land in 1916 for the Sir Oswald Stoll Foundation, a charity in Fulham, London for disabled soldiers returning from World War I and their families. An old soldiers' home named Sir Oswald Stoll mansions based in Fulham Broadway London still continues to house disabled ex-servicemen and women. It also provides supported housing for veterans suffering from mental ill health, and those who, having left the Forces, have found themselves homeless. In 2023, the foundation announced it would sell most of the site to Chelsea Football Club, retaining 20 of the 157 flats.

The Stoll Foundation organized workshops designed to help veterans suffering from post traumatic stress through performing Shakespeare. This led to the Combat Veteran Players, or CVP. Since establishment they have performed with the RSC Open Stages programme, at the Old Vic Vaults, and Shakespeare's Globe. In 2014 they were awarded an inaugural Owle Schreame Award for innovation in historical theatre, for their production of Henry V.

== Personal life ==
Stoll married twice. He married his first wife, Harriet Lewis, in Cardiff in 1892, and they had one daughter. Harriet died in 1902, and Stoll married Millicent Shaw the following year. Oswald and Millicent Stoll had three sons. Lady Stoll became President of the Sir Oswald Stoll Foundation following her husband's death.

Stoll was knighted by King George V in 1919. He died on 9 January 1942 at his home in Putney, 33 Putney Hill. He was buried at Putney Vale Cemetery on the afternoon of 12 January. According to his wishes, the funeral was held at an hour which would not conflict with his theatres' shows.

== Bibliography ==
- The Grand Survival: A Theory of Immortality by Natural Law, London : Simpkin, Marshall & Co., 1904.
- The People's Credit. London : E. Nash, 1916.
- Freedom in Finance. London : T.F. Unwin, 1918.
- "Broadsheets" on National Finance. London : W.J. Roberts, 1921.
- More "broadsheets" on the National Finance. London : W.J. Roberts, 1922.
- National Productive Credit. London : George Allen & Unwin, 1933.

For an analysis of Stoll's writings see Vincent Barnett, 'A Creditable Performance? Sir Oswald Stoll as Business Strategist and Monetary Heretic', Journal of the History of Economic Thought, September 2009.
