= Moss Empires =

Former theatre chain in the UK

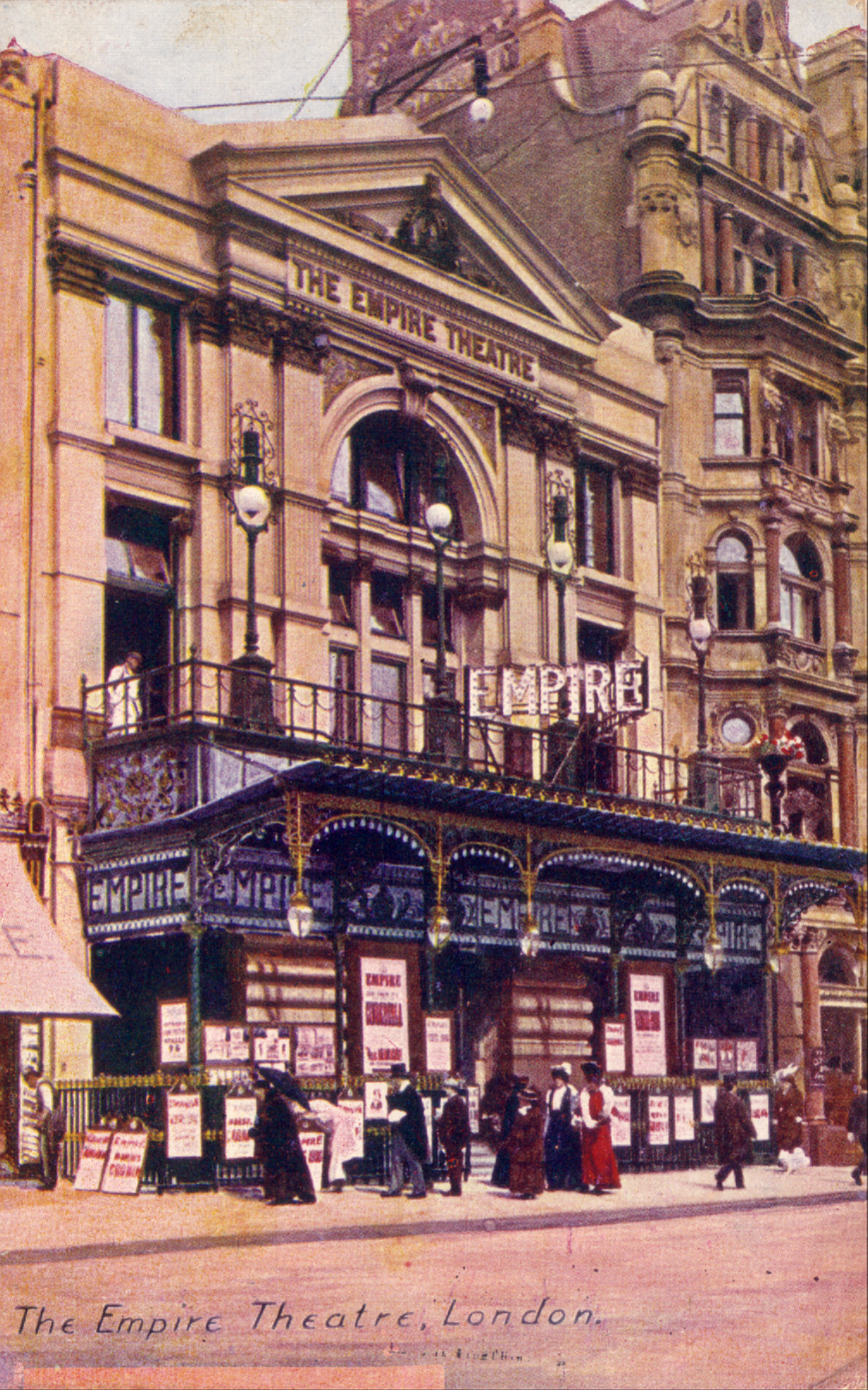
The Empire Theatre, Leicester Square

Moss Empires was a company formed in Edinburgh in 1899, from the merger of the theatre companies owned by Sir Edward Moss, Richard Thornton and Sir Oswald Stoll. This created the largest chain of variety theatres and music halls in the United Kingdom. The business was successful, with major variety theatres in almost every city in the UK and Ireland, and was advertised as the largest group in the world.

== History ==
The group had grown to over 50 theatres when Stoll withdrew his in 1910 to run them as a separate business.

The first Royal Command Variety Performance was planned for Sir Edward Moss's Edinburgh Empire in the Coronation year 1911 but it burned down and instead was held at the London Palace Theatre in 1912, owned then by Sir Alfred Butt, a competitor of Moss, who later joined its alliance; with many subsequent performances being given at the London Palladium.

In 1932, impresario and producer George Black oversaw the merging of GTC (General Theatre Corporation) with Moss Empires variety circuit. Black became in charge of the new company Moss Empires Group and controlled a chain of 53 theatres all over the UK. In 1938, Black became the joint managing director of Moss Empires making him one of London's most powerful producers before his death in 1945.

In 1945 Val Parnell became managing director of Moss Empires until 1958.

Prince Littler became chairman in 1947 and after some 30 years the Moss and Stoll companies reunited.

The company ended its promotion of music halls during the 1960s, due to increasing competition from other entertainment media.

In 1964, Stoll Moss was acquired by Lew Grade; it later became part of his Associated Communications Corporation. ACC was acquired by Robert Holmes à Court in 1982.

The company continues as Really Useful Theatres, formed from the sale of the Stoll Moss theatres by Janet Holmes à Court to RUG Theatres, during January 2000. They continue to manage six theatres, the London Palladium, Theatre Royal, Drury Lane, the Gillian Lynne Theatre, the Adelphi, His Majesty's and the Cambridge Theatre.

== Examples of theatres ==
=== England ===
- Bradford Alhambra (1914)
- Liverpool Olympia (1905)
- Liverpool Empire Theatre (1925)
- Newcastle Empire (1890)
- Nottingham Empire Palace (1898)
- Sunderland Empire Theatre (1907)

==== London ====
- Empire Theatre of Varieties, Leicester Square
- Hackney Empire (1901)
- London Palladium (1910)
- Coliseum Theatre (1904)
- Theatre Royal, Drury Lane (1812)

=== Scotland ===
- Alhambra Theatre Glasgow (1910–1968) 20% ownership only, ending in 1952
- Empire Palace Theatre, Edinburgh (1892–1963)
- Glasgow Empire Theatre (1897–1963)

=== Wales ===
- Empire Theatre, Oxford Street, Swansea (1900–1960)

=== Former Moss Empire venues ===
- O2 Shepherd's Bush Empire (1903)
