= List of theatres in Scotland =

The following is a list of active theatres and concert halls in Scotland. They are organised alphabetically by name.

In rural areas, church halls and town halls may double up as theatres, and many colleges and universities also have their own auditoria.

== A ==
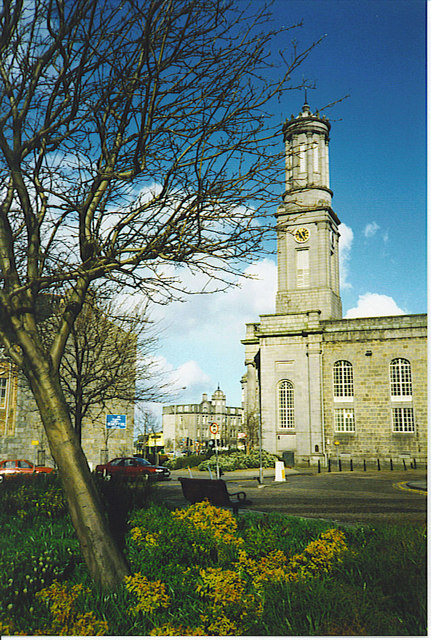
Aberdeen Arts Centre

- Abbey Theatre, Arbroath
- Aberdeen Arts Centre
- AECC, Aberdeen
- Adam Smith Theatre, Kirkcaldy
- Alhambra Theatre Glasgow
- The Alhambra Theatre, Dunfermline
- Aros Centre Isle of Skye
- Arts Guild, Greenock
- Assembly Roxy, Edinburgh

== B ==
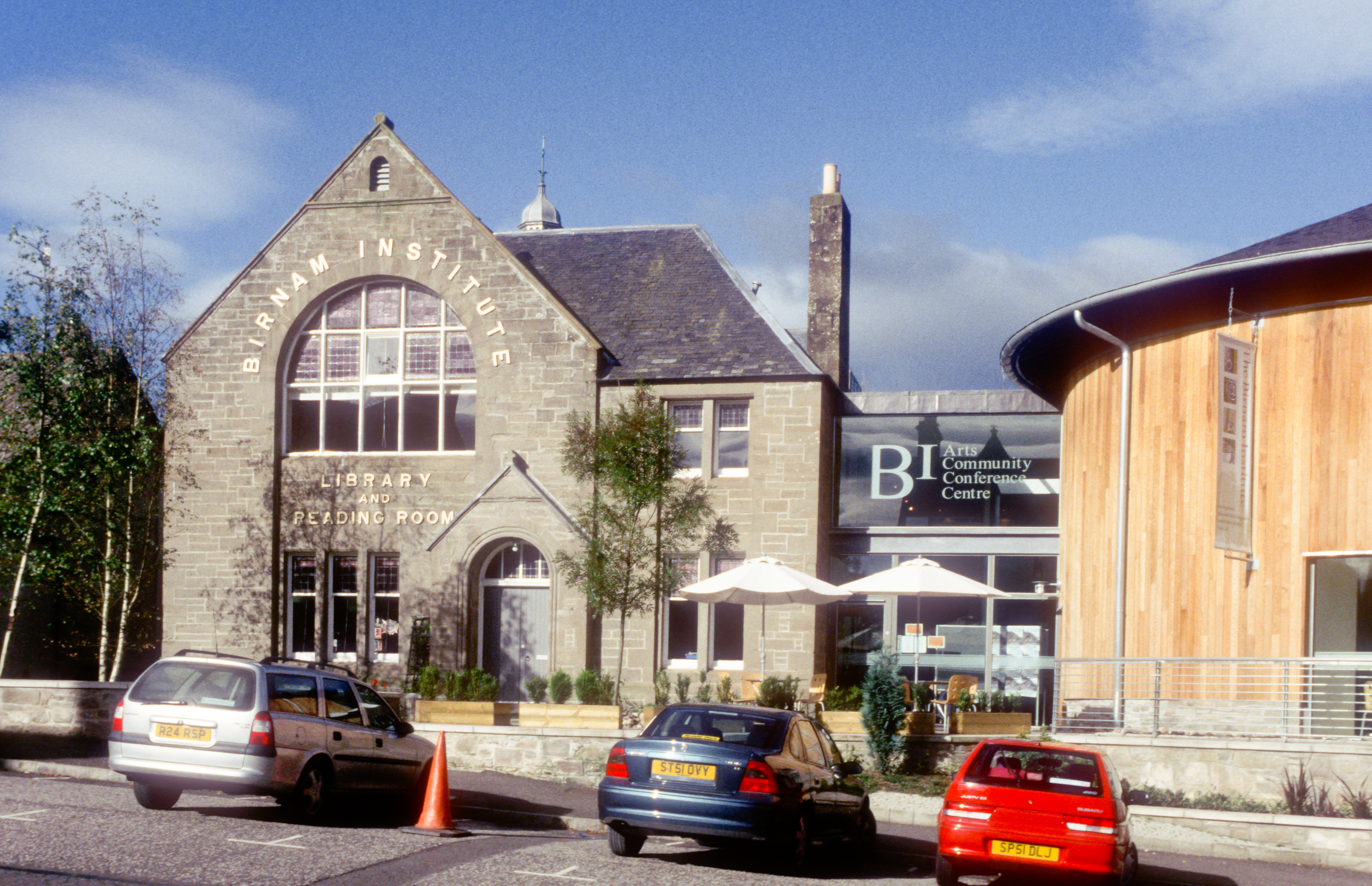
Birnam Arts

- Barrfields Pavilion, Largs
- Beach Ballroom, Aberdeen
- Bedlam, Edinburgh
- Biggar Puppet Theatre
- Birnam Arts, Birnam
- Bowhill Little Theatre, Selkirk
- Britannia Music Hall, Glasgow
- Brunton Theatre, Musselburgh
- Byre, St Andrews

== C ==
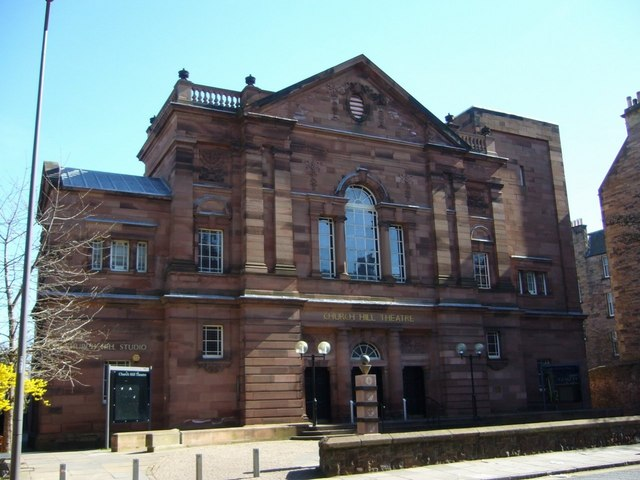
Church Hill theatre

- C venues, Edinburgh
- Caird Hall, Dundee
- Capitol, Aberdeen
- Carnegie Hall, Dunfermline
- Catstrand, St John's Town of Dalry
- Centre for Contemporary Arts, Glasgow
- Church Hill Theatre, Edinburgh
- Citizens, Glasgow
- Clyde Auditorium, Glasgow
- Corn Exchange, Cupar
- Corn Exchange, Edinburgh
- Cottiers, Glasgow, Glasgow

== D ==
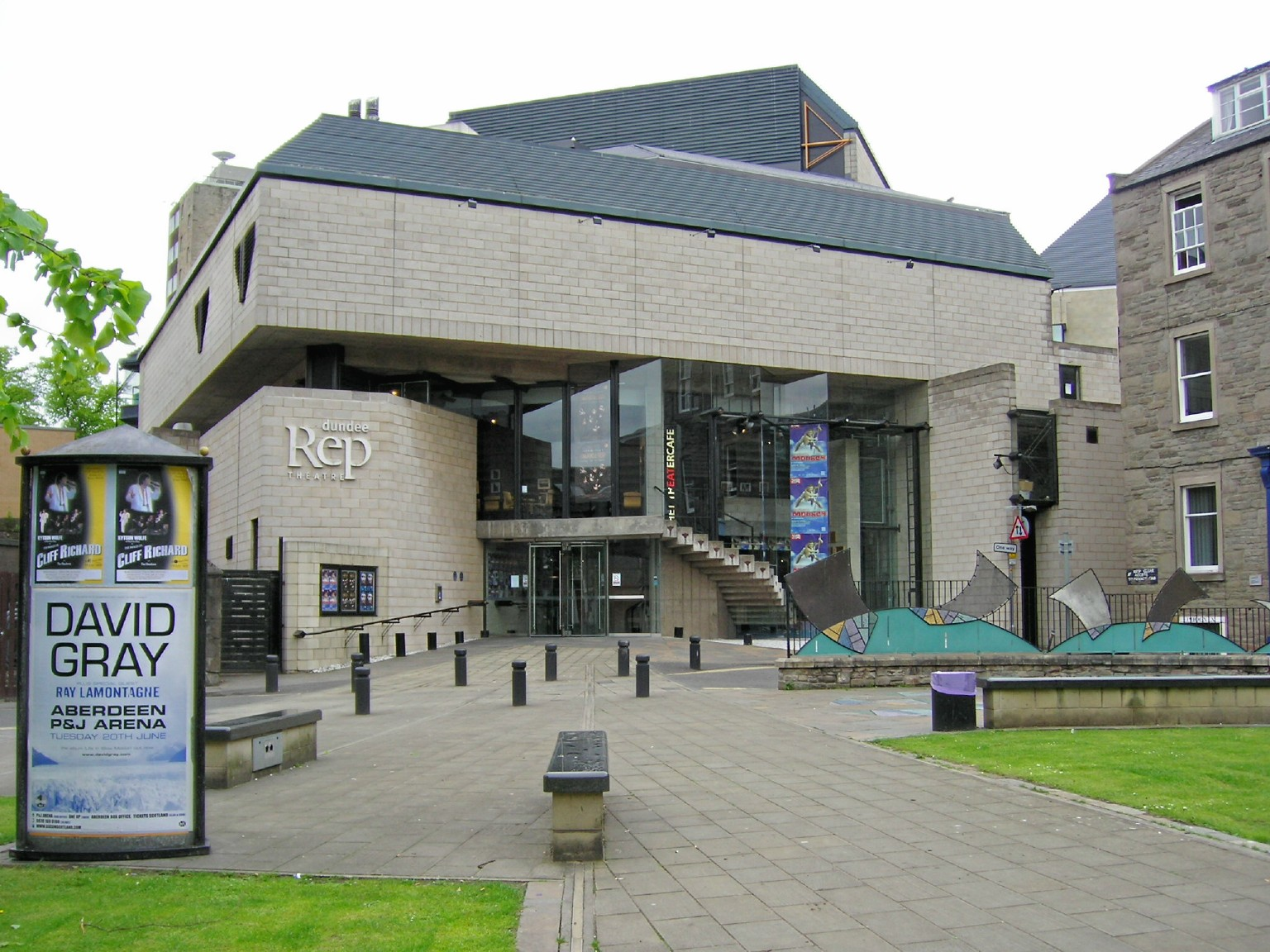
Dundee Rep

- Dumbarton People's Theatre, Dumbarton
- Dundee Contemporary Arts, Dundee
- Dundee Repertory Theatre

== E ==
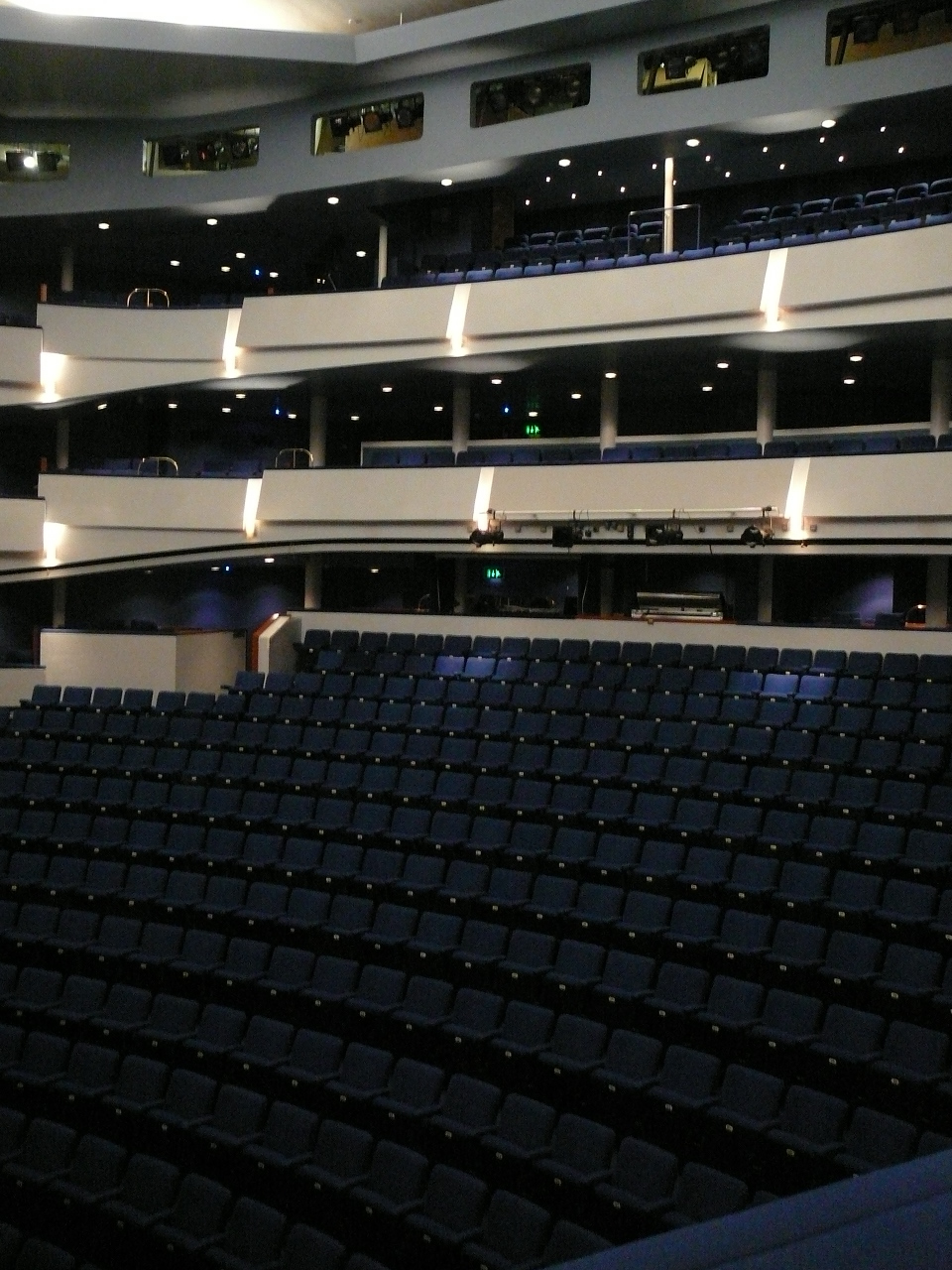
Eden Court

- Eastgate Theatre and Arts Centre, Peebles
- Eastwood Theatre, Giffnock, Glasgow
- East Kilbride Arts Centre
- East Kilbride Village Theatre
- Eden Court, Inverness
- Edinburgh Playhouse, Edinburgh; by seating capacity, the largest theatre in the UK

== F ==
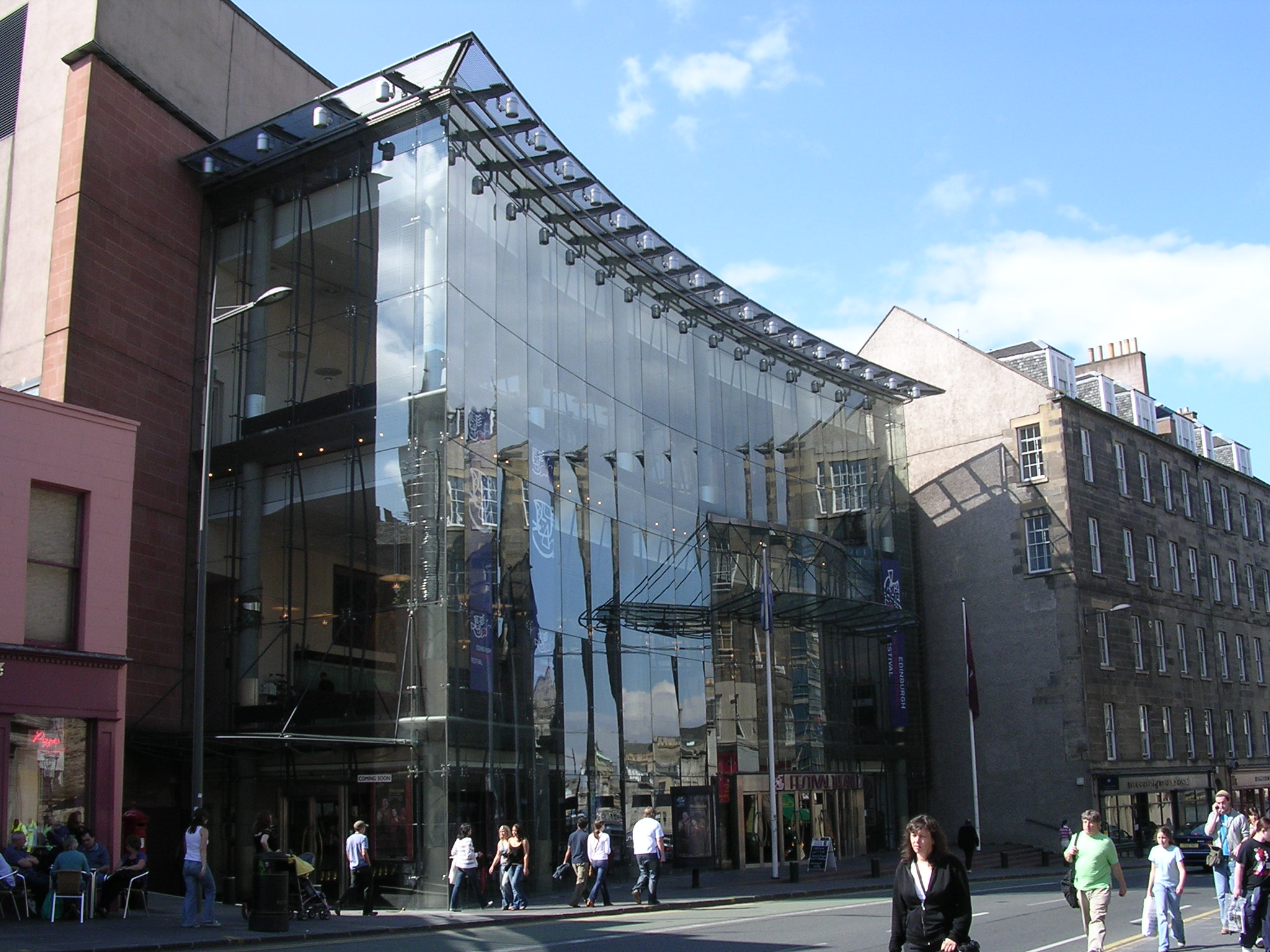
Festival Theatre

- Festival Theatre, Edinburgh
- The Fullarton, Castle Douglas

== G ==
- Gable End Theatre, Hoy
- Gaiety Theatre, Ayr
- Garrison Theatre, Lerwick
- Glasgow City Halls
- Glasgow Rep
- Glasgow Royal Concert Hall
- Gordon Aikman Theatre, Edinburgh

== H ==
- Hamilton Townhouse, Hamilton
- Harbour Arts Centre, Irvine
- Heart of Hawick, Hawick
- His Majesty's, Aberdeen
- Howden Park Centre, Livingston
- The Hydro, Glasgow

== I ==
- Isle of Bute Discovery Theatre

== K ==
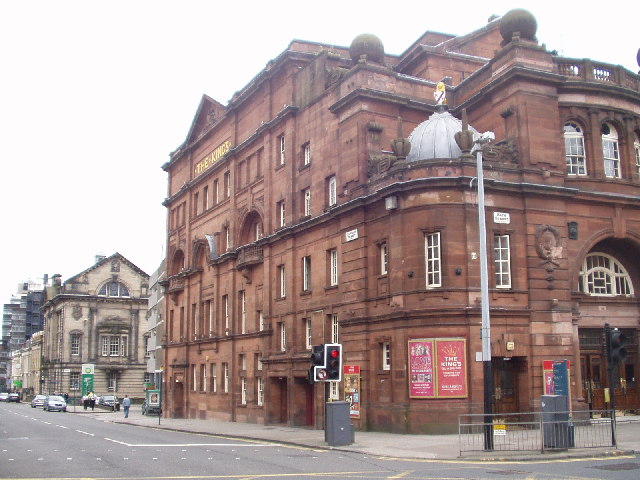
The King's, Glasgow

- King's, Edinburgh
- King's, Glasgow
- King's, Kilmarnock
- Kirkwall Arts Theatre, Kirkwall

== L ==
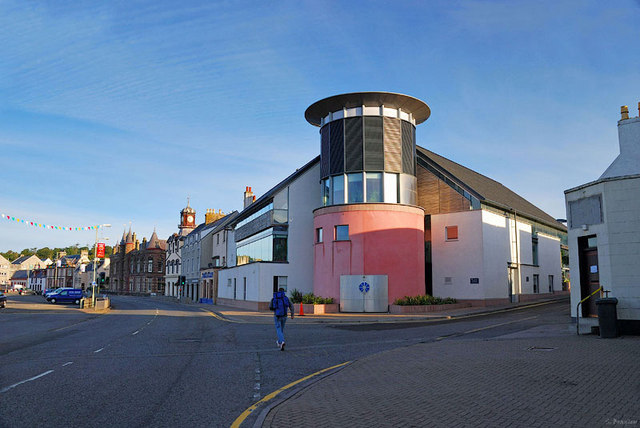
An Lanntair

- An Lanntair, Stornoway
- The Lemon Tree, Aberdeen
- Lochgelly Centre, Lochgelly
- Lochside Theatre, Gatehouse of Fleet

== M ==
- Macrobert, Stirling
- The Mill Thurso
- Mitchell, Glasgow (part of Mitchell Library)
- Mull Little Theatre, Isle of Mull
- Music Hall, Aberdeen

== O ==
- Oran Mor, Byres Road, Glasgow
- Orkney Theatre, Kirkwall

== P ==
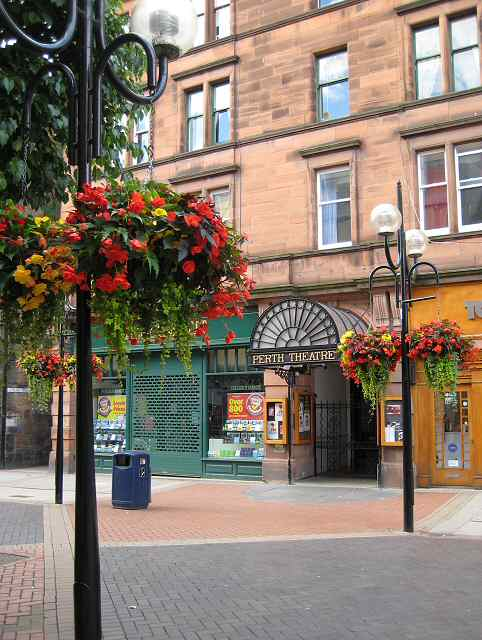
Perth Theatre

- Palace, Kilmarnock
- Pavilion, Glasgow
- Perth Concert Hall, Perth
- Perth Theatre, Perth
- Pitlochry Festival Theatre, Pitlochry
- The Pleasance, Edinburgh

== Q ==
- Queen's Hall, Edinburgh

== R ==
- The Ramshorn, Glasgow
- Regal Community Theatre, Bathgate
- Rothes Halls, Glenrothes
- Royal Conservatoire of Scotland, Glasgow
- Royal Lyceum Theatre, Edinburgh
- Rutherglen Town Hall, Glasgow
- Ryan Leisure Centre, Stranraer

== S ==
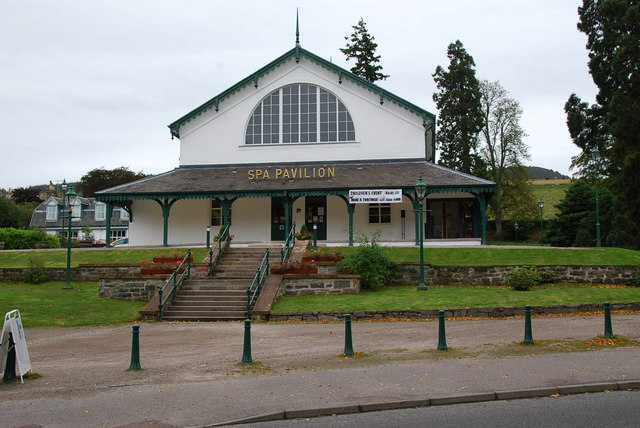
Strathpeffer Pavilion

- Scottish Dance Theatre, Dundee
- SECC, Glasgow
- The Stand, Edinburgh
- The Stand, Glasgow
- Strathpeffer Pavilion, Strathpeffer

== T ==
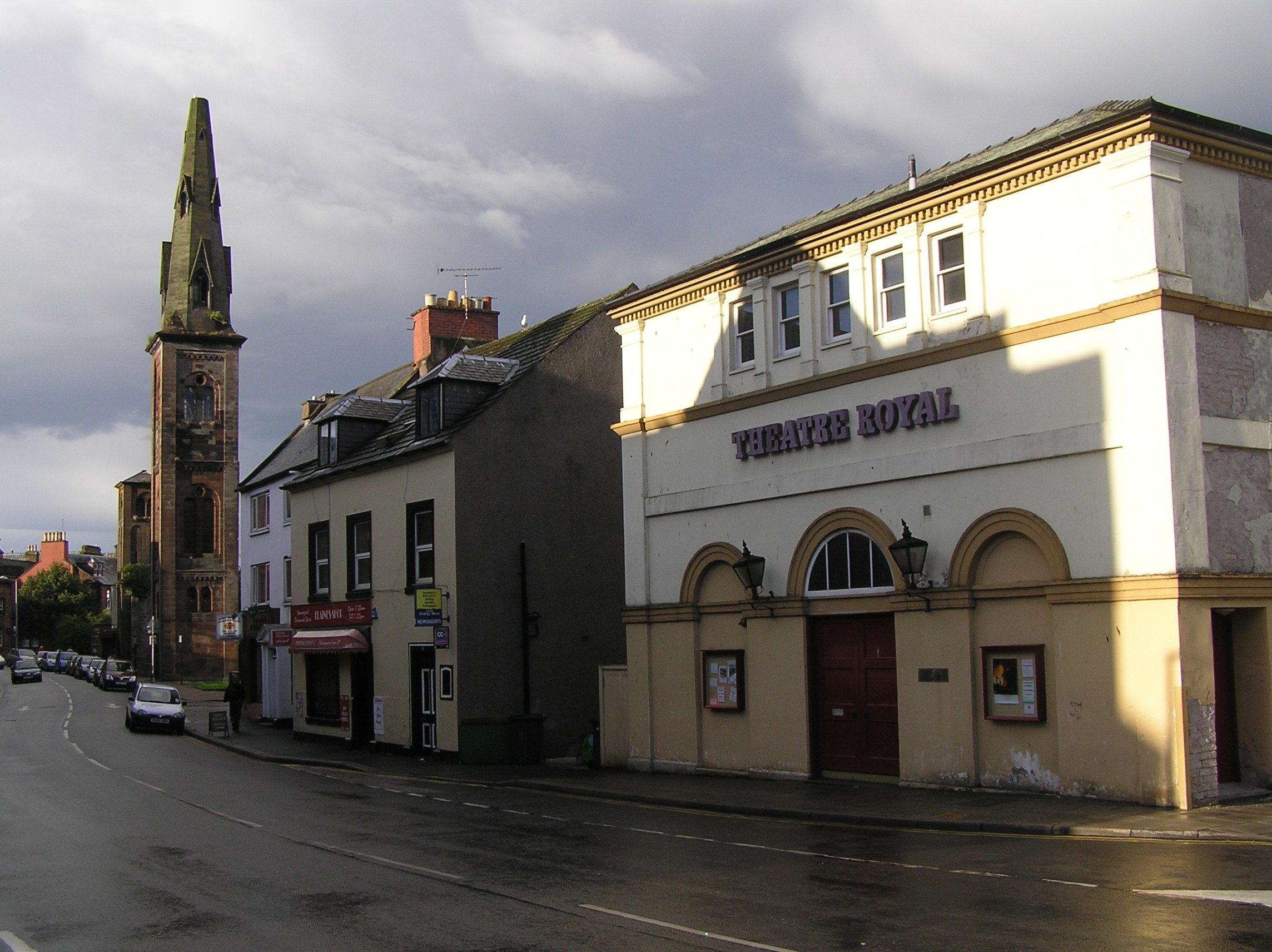
Theatre Royal in Dumfries

- Theatre Royal, Dumfries
- Theatre Royal, Edinburgh
- Theatre Royal, Glasgow
- Tivoli Theatre, Aberdeen
- Tramway, Glasgow
- Traverse Theatre, Edinburgh
- Tron Theatre, Glasgow

== U ==
- Underbelly, Edinburgh
- University Theatre, Edinburgh
- Usher Hall, Edinburgh

== W ==
- The Wynd, Melrose
- Websters Theatre, Glasgow, Glasgow
- Webster Memorial Theatre, Arbroath

== See also ==
- Theatre of Scotland
- Aberdeen theatres and concert halls
- List of Scottish dramatists
