= Duncan Hendry =

Theatre executive (1951–2023)

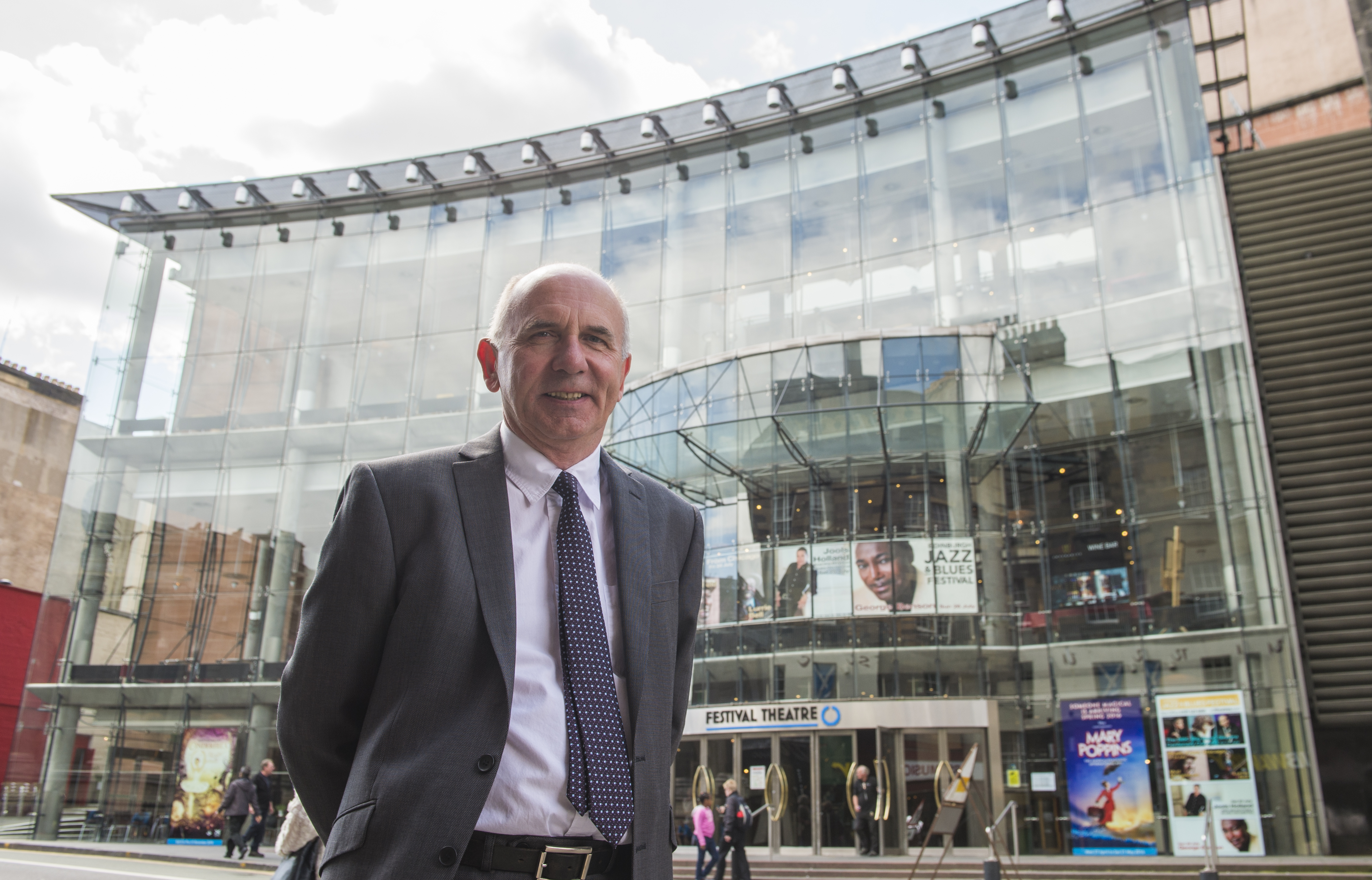
- Hendry in front of the Festival Theatre, Edinburgh 2015
- Born: 9 November 1951
- Died: 2 March 2023 (aged 71)
- Education: University of St Andrews
- Occupations: Theatre and Arts Impresario
- Employers: Aberdeen Performing Arts; Capital Theatres Edinburgh
- Organizations: Creative Scotland; Edinburgh Jazz and Blues Festival; Eden Court Theatre
- Spouse: Rosemary Taylor (m. 1990)
- Children: 2

Duncan Frazer Hendry (9 November 1951 – 2 March 2023) was the former Chief Executive of Aberdeen Performing Arts and of Edinburgh's Capital Theatres.

== Education and personal life ==
Although born in Hillhead, Glasgow, Hendry attended George Heriot's School, Edinburgh and the University of St Andrews where he studied Psychology. His father was a prison governor and later inspector of prisons and Hendry attended eight schools as his family moved around following his father's changing work location. He was married to artist Rosemary Taylor from 1990 and they had a son and a daughter. Interviewed in 2012 he listed his hobbies and golf and fishing.

== Career ==
From 1974 to 1977 Hendry was a trainee manager with Unicorn Leisure which ran the Apollo Theatre in Glasgow and which managed acts such as Billy Connolly and Midge Ure. He then set up and ran the Moondance Agency until 1980. For the next decade he was a founder and director of Aberdeen Rock music agency. While he ran Aberdeen Alternative Festival he also published, from 1990 to 1991, the listings magazine Granite City. From 1997 onwards he had a career in theatre, first in Aberdeen then in Edinburgh until his retirement in 2019.

=== Aberdeen Alternative Festival ===
From 1988 to 1998 Hendry was the artistic director of Aberdeen Alternative Festival which took place every October in Aberdeen. This multi-arts event featured performances in theatre, dance, comedy, music and visual arts in many city venues. It became one of the largest festivals in Scotland, second only in scale to the Edinburgh Festival.

In 1993 he brought James Brown to Scotland for the first time, with a performance at the Aberdeen Exhibition Centre.

=== Aberdeen Performing Arts ===
Hendry, who had been manager of the Music Hall from 1997, became the general manager of Aberdeen's performing arts venues in March 1999. This included His Majesty's Theatre, the Music Hall, the Cowdray Hall and the Aberdeen Box Office. He was instrumental in moving the venues into a charitable trust, forming Aberdeen Performing Arts (APA) in 2004. He was a founding trustee of the Lemon Tree, Aberdeen and in 2007 when it faced funding challenges, saved it by incorporating it within APA. He remained as chief executive of APA until 2012.

=== Capital Theatres, Edinburgh ===
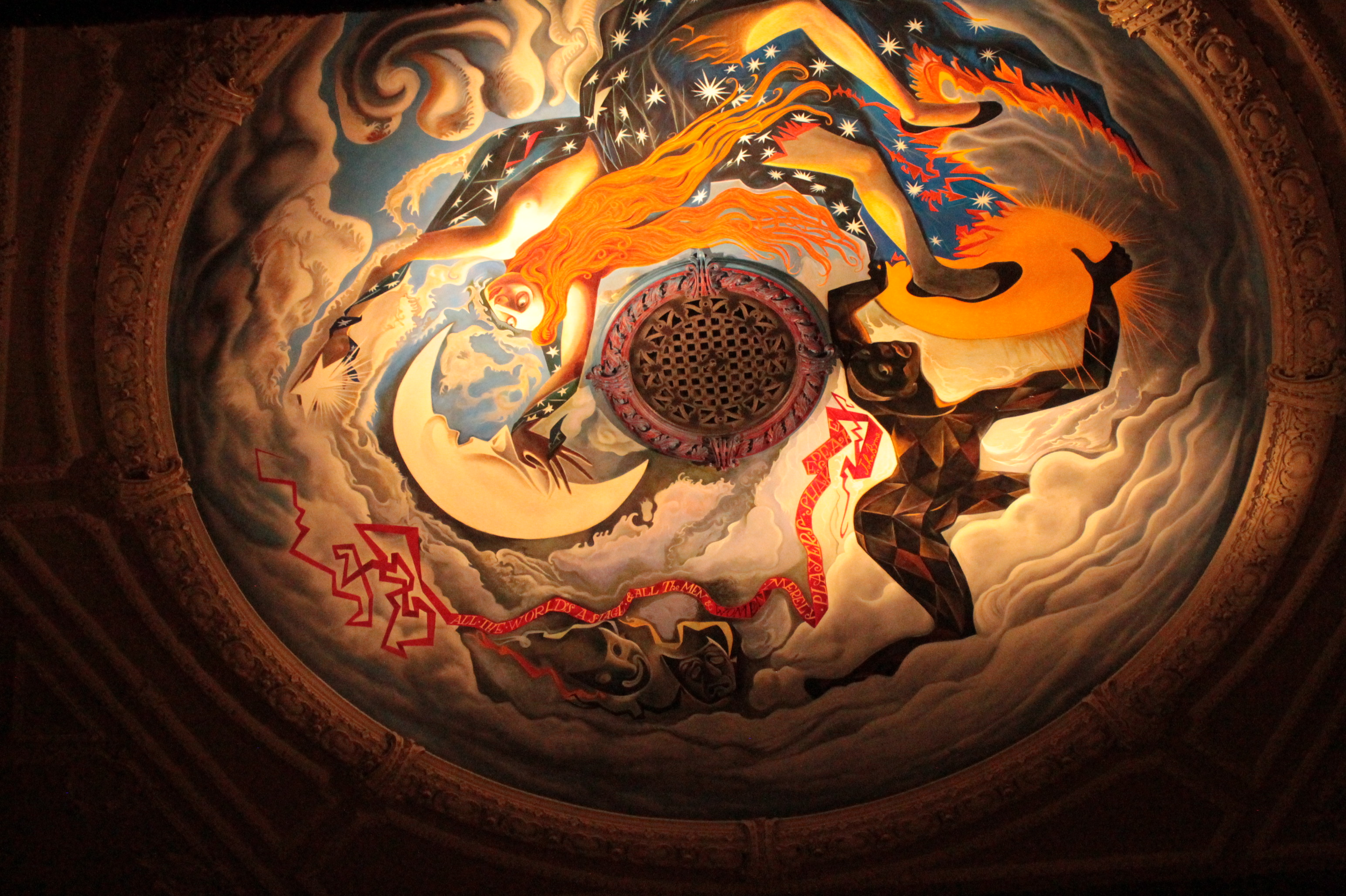
The ceiling of the King's Theatre, Edinburgh painted by John Byrne

Hendry was Chief Executive of Festival City Theatres Trust, which later became Capital Theatres from 2012 to 2019.

He brought National Theatre productions such as War Horse to The Festival Theatre for the first time. He interviewed both Dame Edna Everage and Sting on stage for events. He persuaded Cameron Macintosh to bring shows such as Miss Saigon, Mary Poppins and Les Misérables to the Festival Theatre

He also commissioned Scottish artist John Byrne to paint the dome of the King's Theatre.

When he retired he remained on the board of the campaign to raise the £25m for the redevelopment of the Kings Theatre. Additionally he was board member of Creative Scotland from March 2021, of Eden Court Highlands in Inverness, Edinburgh International Jazz and Blues Festival, a member and chairman of Edinburgh Cultural Venues Group, and chairman of Lung Ha Theatre Company.
