= Jessie Fraser =

- Born: 1801
- Died: 1 July 1875 (aged 73–74)
- Occupations: Actress, singer and theatre manager
- Years active: 1806 – 1875 (theatre actor)

Jessie Fraser later Jessie Ryder then Jessie Pollock (1801 – 1 July 1875) was a stage actress, singer and theatre manager based in Aberdeen.

== Biography ==
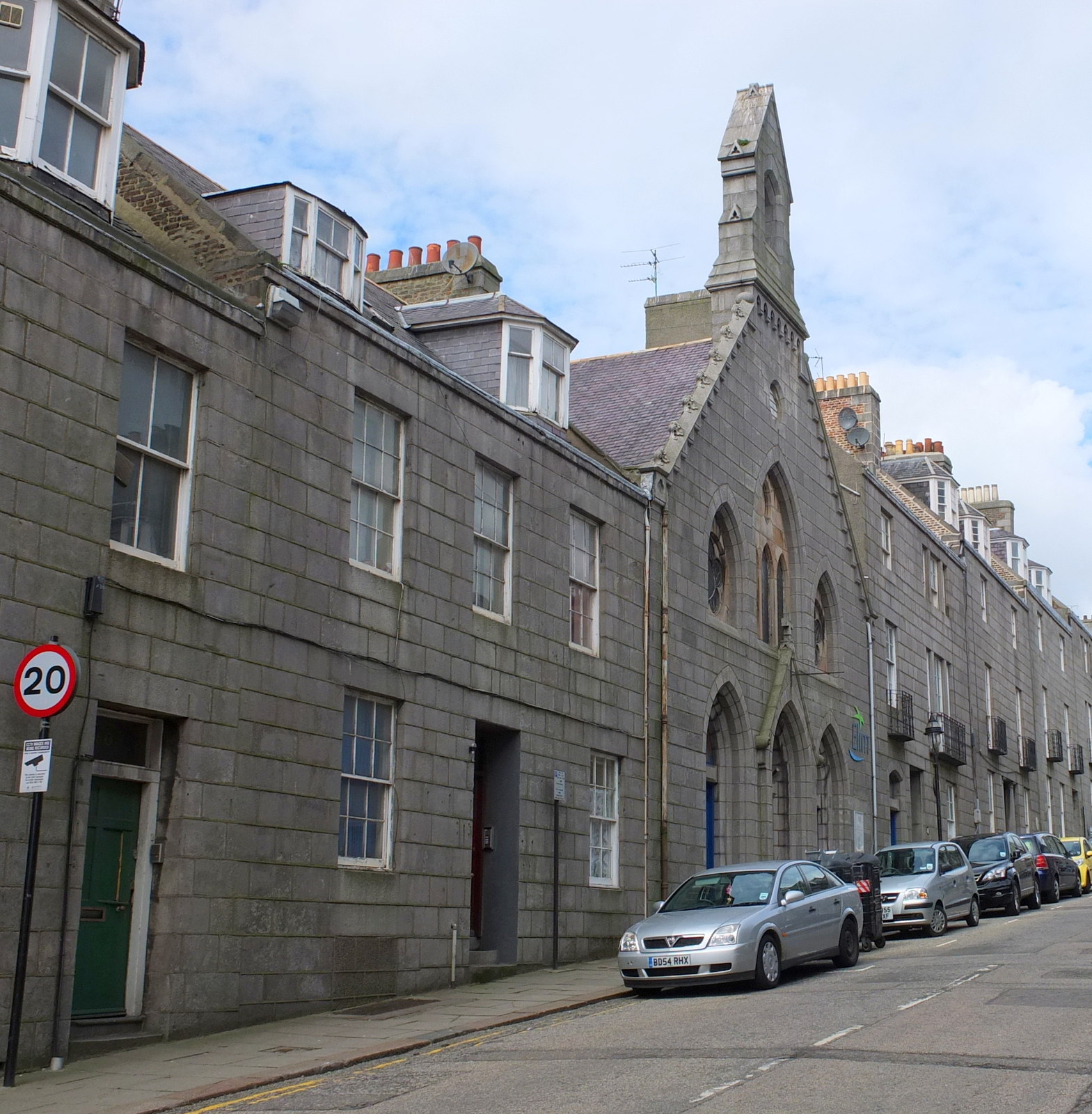
Her father's Theatre Royal is now a church

Little is known about her early life, but in 1812 her father purchased the Theatre Royal in Aberdeen (which has since been converted into a church). At the age of 15, she began her stage career in the Theatre Royal, which she was associated with for the majority of her career. She played a number of Scottish heroines in her youth, including Diana Vernon in Rob Roy, Lucy Bertram in Guy Mannering and Amy Robsart in Kenilworth. Later in her career she appeared in the same plays playing other roles, like Helen MacGregor, Meg Merrilies and Queen Elizabeth (in Kenliworth). She also featured in many classic plays, with her favourite role being Lady Macbeth in Macbeth. On her retirement from the stage, she was gifted a life-size portrait of herself playing the character of Lady Macbeth. Throughout her career she performed alongside many popular performers of the 19th century, including William Macready.

She was married to Welsh actor-manager Corbet Ryder, who had played the titular character in Rob Roy, from 1818 to his death in 1839. They founded the Ryder Company, a touring theatre company operating out of Her Majesty's Opera House in Aberdeen (now the Tivoli Theatre), which Jessie managed with her stepson Tom following Corbet's death. She was later married to a member of her company, John Pollock, from 1842 to his death in 1853.

== In fiction ==
Jessie features as the character Jessie Ryder in Helen Graham's novel The Real Mackay (2024).

== See also ==
- Aberdeen theatres and concert halls
