= Aberdeen theatres and concert halls =

List of theatres and concert halls in Aberdeen, Scotland

Aberdeen has been the host of several theatres and concert halls through history. Some of them have been converted or destroyed over the years.

== Theatres ==
=== Theatre Royal ===
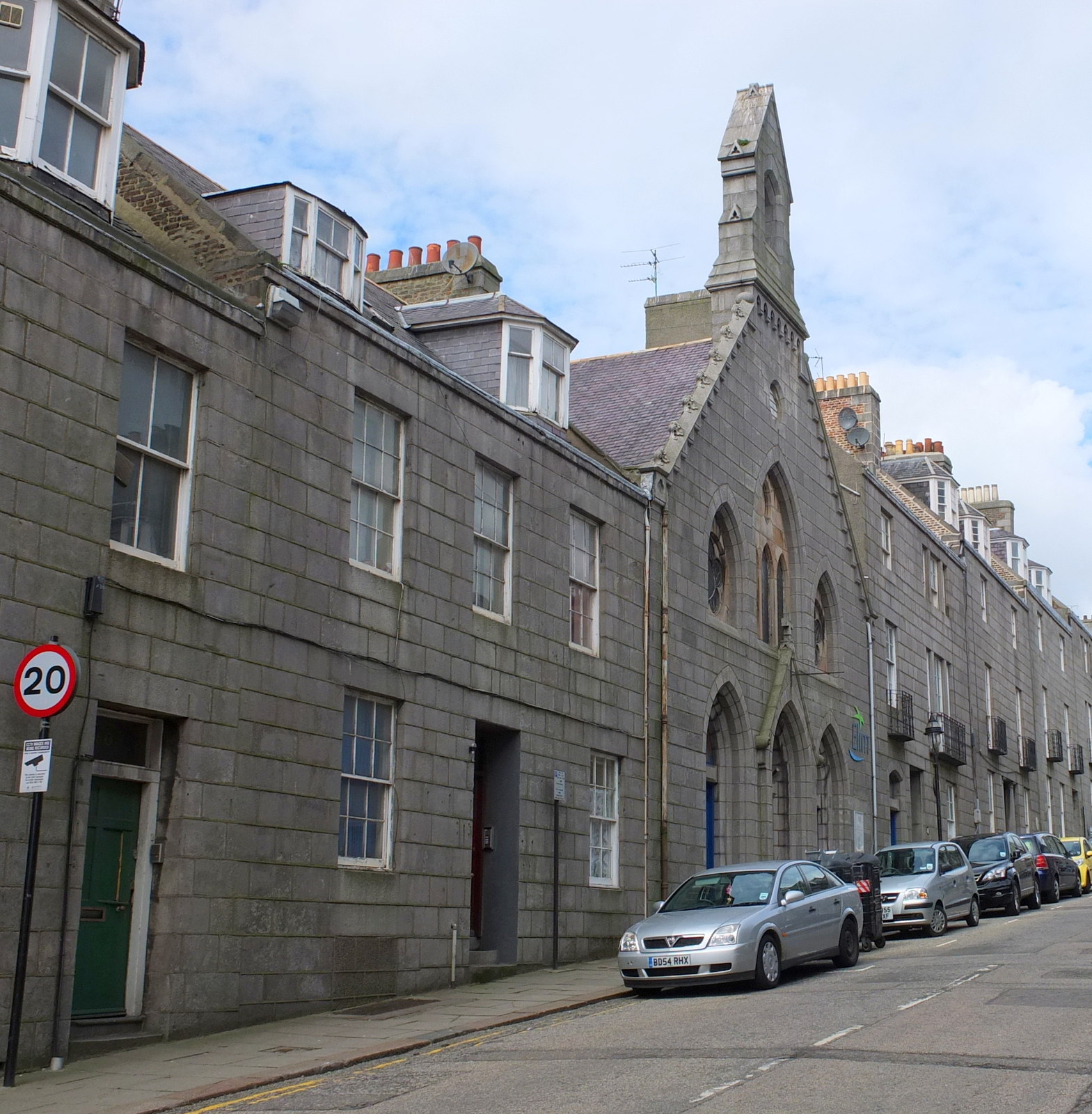
The former Theatre Royal in Marischal Street is now a church

The Theatre Royal was located on Theatre lane, in Aberdeen. It was built in 1789 and demolished in 1877 when replaced by the Tivoli although the same source says that another Theatre Royal in Aberdeen is now a church.

=== Tivoli ===
The Tivoli is located on Guild Street. "It was built in 1872 as Her Majesty's Theatre by C. J. Phipps and James Matthews. The auditorium was later rebuilt by Frank Matcham in 1897 and again in 1909. In 2009 it was bought by a trust, with the intention of renovating it. Work on the exterior work started November 2010, and while it was scheduled to last six months, it took until 2013 until it reopened.

=== HMT ===
His Majesty's Theatre in Aberdeen is the largest theatre in north-east Scotland, seating 1,470. The theatre is sited on Rosemount Viaduct, opposite the city's Union Terrace Gardens. It was designed by Frank Matcham and opened in 1906. The theatre is managed by Aberdeen Performing Arts which also runs the Music Hall, Aberdeen Box Office and the Lemon Tree.

=== Aberdeen Arts Centre ===
Aberdeen Arts Centre is a theatre on King Street in Aberdeen, Scotland. The 350-seater auditorium regularly plays host to music and drama events and is the focus for much of Aberdeen's amateur dramatic activities. The theatre is on two levels, with an upper and a lower gallery for audiences. There is a small orchestra pit and behind the stage there are dressing and rehearsal rooms for the shows and other projects such as local drama groups.

=== The Lemon Tree ===
The Lemon Tree is a studio theatre that hosts touring companies and occasionally generates in-house productions. Operation was transferred from a local trust to Aberdeen Performing Arts in 2008.

== Aberdeen Cinemas Theatre ==
=== The Belmont Cinema ===
The Belmont Cinema is on Belmont Street. It is an arthouse cinema which has been closed since October 2022 following the admininistration of its former owner, the Centre for the Moving Image. It is planned to reopen under new management though a date has not yet been announced.

=== Capitol Theatre ===
The Capitol Theatre is located on Union Street. It has also been known as the Capitol Super Cinema or the Electric Theatre. The building is Category B statutory listed.

The Capitol Cinema opened in February 1933, on the site of the earlier Electric Cinema, seating 2,100 to the plans of architects AGR Mackenzie and Clement George. In 1933, the Capitol was the most luxurious cinema, with full stage facilities and a Compton Organ. The Capitol closed for regular film showings in the 1960s, but it was used also for occasional rock concerts until the late 1990s; it was largely moth-balled since 1998, except for the use of the restaurant as a bar called "Oscars". The B-listed Art deco interior was extremely well preserved at that point. Permission was granted in 2002–03 for conversion to nightclubs, which saw the auditorium split horizontally to form two large bar-clubs, and the rear stage wall cut open to create a large glass wall and additional entrances. The original restaurant is now out of use. Plans to restore and return the Compton pipe organ to the building have never taken place.

In 2011, Aberdeen City Council has consulted The Theatres Trust on the partial demolition of the Capitol Theatre in order to create a hotel accommodation with an associated access and parking The plan, submitted by "Prime Properties Aberdeen c/o A B Robb Ltd", proposes "a change of use of bar/nightclub to Class 7 Hotel with associated part demolition of the existing auditorium and development of hotel accommodation and refurbishment of internal features and associated access and parking" The conditions set by the council however included the approval of:

- the conservation methods for the restoration of the art deco interior and exterior of the building
- specification, location and dimensions for dismantling, relocating and reassembling the original organ pipe screen, organ niches, Compton organ and proscenium arch within the proposed conference room
- details of the restoration and refurbishment of the external canopy and entrance doors, new shop front, entrance lobby and stair and the first floor tea room to recreate the original character and appearance of the building

Also, that the restored art deco café/tea room shown on drawings should not be used unless fully open to the general public, unless the planning authority has given written consent for a variation.

=== The Palace Theatre ===
The Palace Theatre, located on Bridge Street, was built following destruction by fire in 1896 of the People's Palace on the same site. The interior of the new Palace, originally with two tiers, was completely gutted to the shell walls in 1929 and rebuilt, re-opening as a cinema with one balcony in 1931. The four-storey asymmetrical granite front survives largely intact, but this is a crude design of industrial quality - plain with a pediment over the three central bays and three large doorways with thin broken segmental pediments.

== Concerts and reception halls ==
=== Music Hall ===
The Music Hall is a concert hall in Aberdeen, Scotland, formerly the city's Assembly Rooms, located on Union Street in the city centre. It was designed by architect Archibald Simpson, costing £11,500 when it was originally constructed in 1822, opened to the public as a concert hall in 1859, and was extensively renovated in the 1980s.

=== Beach Ballroom ===
The Beach Ballroom is an art deco building on the sea front of Aberdeen, Scotland. It is home to one of Scotland's finest dance floors - famous for its bounce - which floats on fixed steel springs.

=== Elphinstone Hall ===
Elphinstone Hall is the hall of the University of Aberdeen. It is located on their Kings College Campus.

=== Aberdeen Art Gallery ===
The Aberdeen Art Gallery is mostly known for its art exhibitions. However, they also have receptions areas available for custom events.

== Other theatres, halls and cinema ==
- The Alhambra Theatre
- Empire Music Hall, later Kings, 1907
- Dove Paterson's Palladium, Shiprow, 1908
- The Torry Picture Palace, 1910
- The Woodside Picture Palace (The Rinkie), 1910
- Star Picture Palace
- The Globe
- Savoy, 1012
- The Queen's Cinema (formerly The Queen's Rooms), 1912–1981
- La Scala, 1914
- The Picture House, 1914
- The West End (The Playhouse)
- Casino, Wales Street, 1916–1959
- Picturedrome (Cinema House), 1924–1971
- Pooles Palace (Aberdeen's first full-time talkie house), 1931–1959
- Grand Central, 1929
- Regent (Odeon), 1932–2002
- The Astoria
- The Victoria (Inverurie), 1935
- The City Cinema, 1935–1963
- The Picture House (Stonehaven), 1936–82
- The News Cinema, 1936
- The Curzon, 1959
- The Cosmo 2, 1964–1977
- The Majestic (replaced La Scala), 1936–1973
- The Kingsway, 1936 (survived then as a bingo hall)
- The Regal (building started before the war), opened 1954
