= The Dunard Centre =

Planned concert hall in Edinburgh, Scotland

Coordinates: 55.9546°N 3.1903°W

- Interactive map of The Dunard Centre
- Full name: The Dunard Centre
- Former names: IMPACT Centre
- Address: 36 St Andrew Square, Edinburgh, Scotland
- Public transit: St Andrew Square, Edinburgh Trams

Construction
- Architect: David Chipperfield Architects
- Services engineer: Nagata Acoustics

Website
- https://dunardcentre.co.uk

The Dunard Centre (supported by the Royal Bank of Scotland) is a planned concert hall in the New Town area of Edinburgh, Scotland. It will be the first new purpose-built concert hall in Edinburgh in a century.

The venue is David Chipperfield Architects' first concert hall and will be the UK's first Nagata Acoustics hall, comprising a 1000-seat auditorium as well as bars, a cafe, meeting rooms and public spaces. Delivered by the International Music and Performing Arts Charitable Trust (IMPACT) Scotland, public plans for the venue include hosting a variety of musical events including classical, choral, jazz, pop, rock, folk and electronic, as well as comedy, talks, dance and other event types, alongside education and community engagement programmes. The venue will be the home of the Scottish Chamber Orchestra and serve as a principal venue for the Edinburgh International Festival.

== History ==
In December 2016, an international design competition was announced by the international music and performing arts charitable trust (IMPACT) Scotland to be located to the rear of Dundas House, a Royal Bank of Scotland building, at 36 St Andrew Square. The area is within the New Town UNESCO world heritage site, which has seen considerable development in recent years, with new developments at 3–8, 35 and 42 St Andrews Square, as well the recent Multrees Walk and ongoing St James Centre redevelopment. Many Scottish architects, as well as much of the Scottish press and the Royal Incorporation of Architects in Scotland (RIAS), expressed dismay at IMPACT's decision to run the competition from London, which was seen as sidelining Scottish practices.

A shortlist of six architects was released in late January 2017, consisting of Adjaye Associates (with Sandy Brown, Buro Happold and DHA Designs); Allies & Morrison (with Charcoalblue, Speirs & Major, Harrison Stevens and Buro Happold); Barozzi Veiga (with Alan Baxter, Max Fordham, Kahle Acoustics, 3DReid and Ian White Associates); David Chipperfield (with Arup, Whitby Wood, GROSS MAX and Theatre Projects); KPMB (with Simpson & Brown Architects, David Narro Associates, Arup, Sound Space Vision, rankinfraser landscape architecture and Transsolar Energietechnik); Richard Murphy (with Arup, Graven Images, GROSS MAX and Montagu Evans). In April of that year, David Chipperfield Architects were announced as the competition's winners, along with Edinburgh firm Reiach and Hall, with a public consultation running until the 30th.

On 23 August 2018, the developers lodged their planning application with the City of Edinburgh Council. This design differed slightly from earlier renders, with the lower floors being pared back and simplified. On 24 April 2019, the Development was approved by six votes to four votes by the Development Management Sub Committee of the City of Edinburgh Council after five hours of debate.

== Reception from the arts and heritage community ==
The Dunard Centre has been attracted the attention of residents and heritage groups due to its design and location within the Old and New Town of Edinburgh, a UNESCO world heritage site:

Fergus Linehan, the head of the Edinburgh International Festival, said that "artistically and socially, it's a truly transformational project for the Festival." He went on to say the hall would provide a space or acts that would not be suitable for the city's existing concert hall, the Usher Hall, saying "If you're talking about new composers, and digital or electronic work, they don't really fit into that". The Festival hope the hall will become "an exciting place to be", which they say will make it "easier for [them] to attract new and younger audiences".

The Scottish Cultural Secretary, Fiona Hyslop, said "The economic and cultural benefits will be felt throughout Scotland."

Adam Wilkinson from the Edinburgh World Heritage Trust praised the architects for showing "a good understanding of the World Heritage Site".

The Architectural Heritage Society of Scotland emphasized a need to project the existing Dundas House building, describing it as "arguably the most important town house in all of Scotland". The charity claimed the development would "detract from the historic building's character, greatly diminishing its special interest and status as the focal point of the east end of Edinburgh's New Town plan". They lodged a formal planning complaint with the Council over the Dunard Centre's "excessive scale and massing".

A local heritage group, the Cockburn Association, supported the plans, saying they "welcome the considerable effort the developers have undertaken to positively consult with a wide variety of stakeholders". The group believed the building would "contribute significantly to the artistic life of the city" and serve as a catalyst for the revitalisation of the surrounding area. The group praised a number of aspects of the Dunard Centre proposal, such as the public access through the site's ground floor lobby, although they requested legal recognition of this right-of-way for the long term, and the site's strong transport links and proximity to tram and bus stops and Waverley Station. However, the Cockburn Association stipulated a number of recommendations they had for the project that the annex block rooftops feature simple, clear roof detailing to avoid large sections of panelling, or that the building's final surface finishes be made to acknowledge the surrounding buildings’ stone exteriors. They also had concerns about concert attendees' cars overstraining parking in the New Town. They sought to encourage attendee parking within the St James Centre development, possibly through a relationship providing reduced evening parking rates. The group also proposed that there be an integration between public transport and concert ticketing, such as free bus or tram tickets being included, to encourage its usage.

The Edinburgh International Book Festival expressed an interest in holding future events in the Dunard Centre, which is located at the opposite end of George Street from the site in Charlotte Square which was their base from 1983 to 2019.

== Opposition from property developers ==
The centre has been controversial with local businesses, however: the developers of the nearby St James Centre, Nuveen Real Estate, lodged a complaint about the Dunard Centre's proposed lorry access, which would see daily HGV deliveries along a pedestrianised shopping street. They also criticised the building's height, suggesting it would block views from and of their W Hotel as the well the building's large size and its facade, describing it as being made "entirely of concrete". In response, the Dunard Centre's owners threatened to sue the St James Centre's developers after they distributed letters urging surrounding residents and businesses to object to the concert hall's development. The Dunard Centre's developers claim the letters were factually inaccurate and that the hall would benefit the local area. Nuveen Real Estate also complained that the Dunard Centre had not been made to bury their building services underground, which their neighbouring development had been forced to.

Gleneagles, a local hotel, also objected to the concert hall, saying they had not been included within the planning submission's noise impact assessment. The Dunard Centre's developers released a statement saying that the concert hall and studio space would feature "high sound insulation performance" and would thus provide "effective control of noise emissions to neighbouring buildings".

== Current situation ==
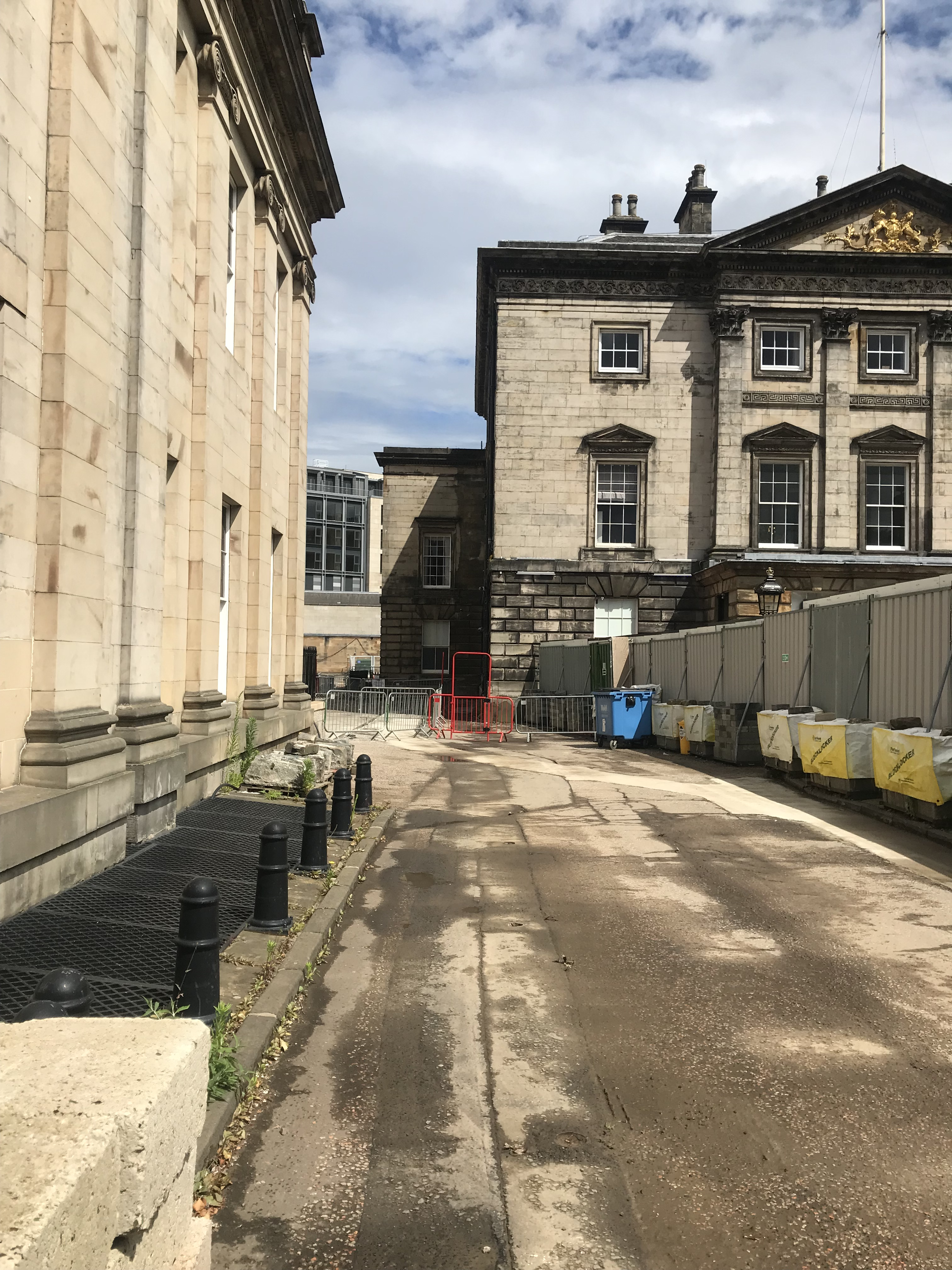
St Andrew Square site entrance in July 2024

Revised planning permission was granted in 2021. Work on clearing the site got under way in February 2023. Ownership of the land was transferred to IMPACT Scotland at the beginning of 2023. In June 2024, it was announced that the construction of the building would start early in 2025, with an estimated construction period of four years. The Dunard Centre has received funding of £25 million from local and national governments as part of the Edinburgh and South East Scotland City Region Deal (the ESESCRD’s only cultural project), and an additional £35 million has been donated by the Dunard Fund. Capital fundraising actively continues with final costs to be established when construction contracts are signed.

In March 2025, a delay in the start of construction was reported, following the departure of the main contractor, Sir Robert McAlpine, from the project. The opening of the centre was now expected to be early in 2029. Additional funding of £30 million "in private philanthropy" was also announced. A further grant, from the Carnegie Corporation of New York to the value of US$1 million, was announced in June 2025.

Build costs have risen from an initial estimate of £45-£75 million to a contract awarded to Balfour Beatty for £162 million in October 2025. The Dunard Fund is contributing a further £20 million, matched by the Scottish Government.

In March 2026, the centre announced a partnership with the Wigmore Hall in London. The two venues will collaborate on programming, artistic exchanges and special commissions. The Wignore Hall's director, John Gilhooly, will chair an "artistic advisory committee" at the Dunard Centre.

== See also ==
- List of Edinburgh music venues
