= King's Theatre =

King's Theatre or Kings Theatre may refer to:

== Theatres ==
=== Australia ===
- King's Theatre, Adelaide, South Australia (1911–1928)
- King's Theatre, Melbourne, Victoria (1908–1950s)
- King's Theatre, Thirroul, New South Wales (built 1925), now Anita's Theatre
- Metropolis Fremantle, Western Australia, a performance venue and nightclub, formerly King's Theatre

=== United Kingdom ===
- His Majesty's Theatre, London, England, known as King's Theatre 1714–1837
- King's Theatre, Edinburgh, Scotland
- King's Theatre, Glasgow, Scotland
- King's Theatre, Hammersmith, London, England
- Kings Theatre, Kilmarnock, Scotland
- Kings Theatre, Southsea, Portsmouth, England

=== Other countries ===
- Kings Theatre, now Mercury Theatre, Auckland, New Zealand
- Kings Theatre (Brooklyn), New York City, U.S.

== Other uses ==
- King's Theatre (horse) (1991–2011), a racehorse
