= List of Edinburgh music venues =

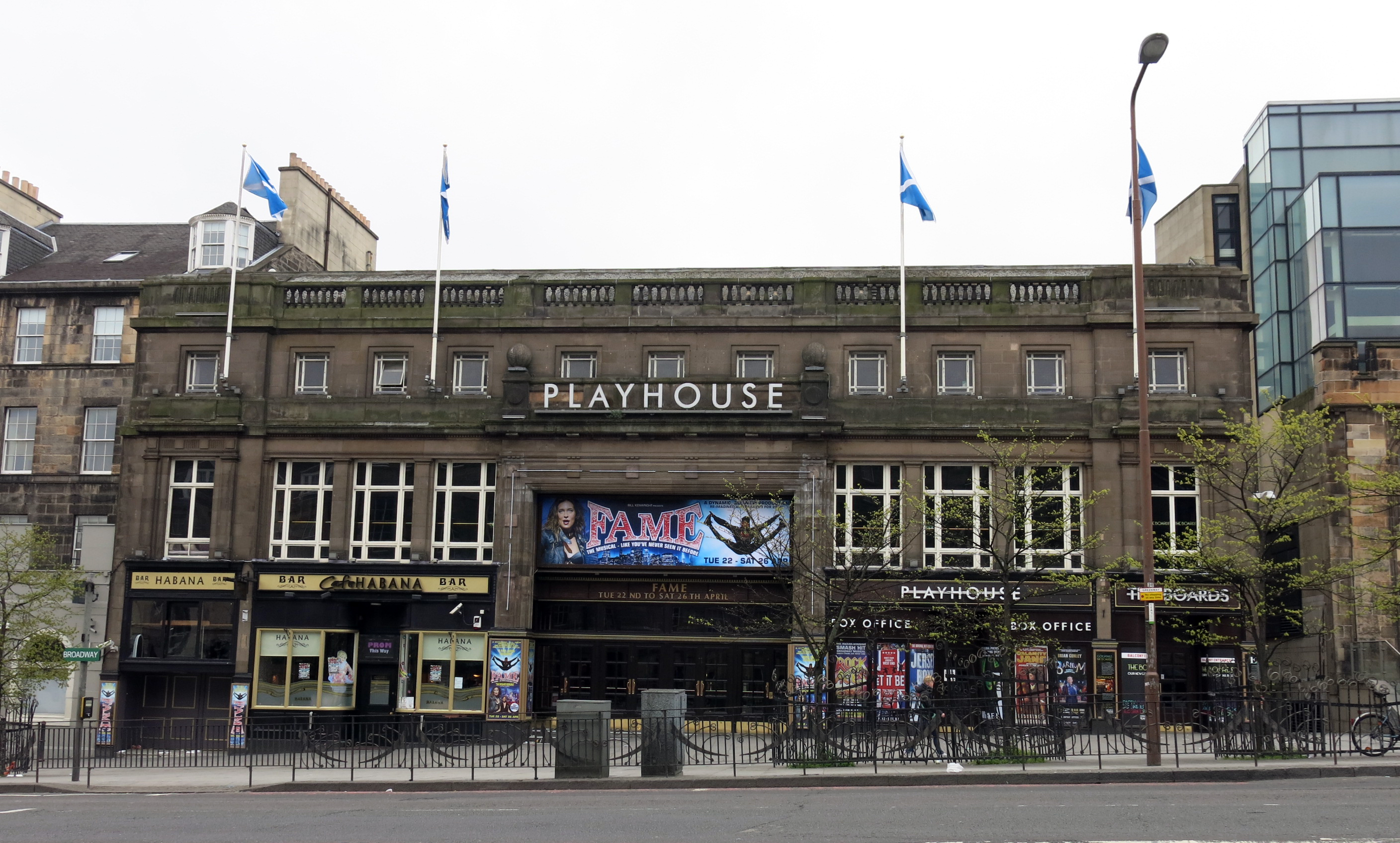
Edinburgh Playhouse, Edinburgh's largest-capacity permanent music venue.

Edinburgh is home to a wide variety of music venues for a small European capital.

== Permanent venues ranked by capacity ==
1. Edinburgh Arena (proposed) - 8,500 with standing, 6,450 all seating, 5,475 family show mode, 3,950 'auditorium mode'. Planned to open in 2027.
2. Edinburgh Playhouse – 3,059 seated
3. Edinburgh Corn Exchange – 3,000 for concerts
4. Usher Hall – 2,200 seated, 2,900 with standing, 1,970 cabaret
5. Ross Bandstand, Princess Street Gardens - 2,500 seated
6. Edinburgh Festival Theatre – 1,915 seated
7. Leith Theatre – 1,500 seated
8. King's Theatre – 1,300 seated
9. The Dunard Centre (proposed) - 1,000 seated
10. Stramash - 900 capacity
11. Queen's Hall - 900 capacity
12. Assembly Rooms - 900 (Music hall, standing), 788 (music hall, theatre set up), 400 (Ballroom in theatre set up)
13. The Liquid Room - 650-700 capacity for live music, 800 for club nights
14. Royal Lyceum Theatre - 658 seats
15. The Bongo Club - 600 maximum
16. Cabaret Voltaire - 600 maximum
17. La Belle Angele - 600 capacity
18. Mash House - up to 250
19. The Voodoo Rooms - 200 (Ballroom, standing), 90 (Speakeasy standing)
20. Bannerman's Bar - 175 concert room
21. Sneaky Pete's - 100 capacity

== Temporary music venues ranked ==
1. Murrayfield Stadium – 67,144 seated, recently permitted to expand to 72,990.
2. Royal Highland Centre - 35,000 (south arena for concert), 27,000 (main ring for concert), 25,000 (west arena for concert), 15,000 (north arena for concert), 9,000 (highland hall for concert), 6,000 (lowland hall for concert)
3. Easter Road – 20,421 seated
4. Tynecastle Park – 20,099 seated
5. Edinburgh Castle Bandstand (Royal Edinburgh Military Tattoo) - 8,800 seated

== All venues ranked ==
1. Murrayfield Stadium – 67,144 seated, recently permitted to expand to 72,990.
2. Royal Highland Centre - 35,000 (south arena for concert), 27,000 (main ring for concert), 25,000 (west arena for concert), 15,000 (north arena for concert), 9,000 (highland hall for concert), 6,000 (lowland hall for concert)
3. Easter Road - 20,421 seated
4. Tynecastle Park – 20,099 seated
5. Edinburgh Castle Bandstand (Royal Edinburgh Military Tattoo) - 8,800 seated
6. Edinburgh Arena - 8,500 with standing, 6,450 all seating, 5,475 family show mode, 3,950 'auditorium mode'. Planned to open in 2027.
7. Edinburgh Playhouse – 3,059 seated
8. Edinburgh Corn Exchange – 3,000 for concerts
9. Usher Hall – 2,200 seated, 2,900 with standing, 1,970 cabaret
10. Ross Bandstand, Princess Street Gardens - 2,500 seated
11. Edinburgh Festival Theatre – 1,915 seated
12. Leith Theatre – 1,500 seated
13. King's Theatre – 1,300 seated
14. The Dunard Centre (under construction) - 1,000 seated
15. Stramash - 900 capacity
16. Queen's Hall - 900 capacity
17. Assembly Rooms - 900 (Music hall, standing), 788 (music hall, theatre set up), 400 (Ballroom in theatre set up)
18. The Liquid Room - 650-700 capacity for live music, 800 for club nights
19. Royal Lyceum Theatre - 658 seats
20. The Bongo Club - 600 maximum
21. Cabaret Voltaire - 600 maximum
22. La Belle Angele - 600 capacity
23. Mash House - up to 250
24. The Voodoo Rooms - 200 (Ballroom, standing), 90 (Speakeasy standing)
25. Bannerman's Bar - 175 concert room
26. Sneaky Pete's - 100 capacity
