= Edinburgh Arena =

Proposed indoor arena

- Edinburgh Park Arena
- Rendering of the proposed arena
- Location: Edinburgh, Scotland
- Capacity: 8,500 (with standing); 6,450 (all seated)
- Public transit: Edinburgh Park; Edinburgh Park

Construction
- Groundbreaking: Q1 2026 (projected)
- Opened: 2027–2028 (projected)
- Cost: £80 million (projected)
- Architect: HOK
- Structural engineer: Buro Happold
- Services engineer: Buro Happold

Website
- Official website

Edinburgh Arena, also known as Edinburgh Park Arena, is a proposed indoor arena to be built at the Edinburgh Park business park in the South Gyle area of Edinburgh, Scotland. The venue is planned to have a maximum capacity of around 8,500 people, with mixed seating and standing configurations.

Edinburgh is one of few European capital cities without a large capacity indoor arena.

== Leith proposal (2004) ==
In September 2004 the owner of Leith Docks, Forth Ports, announced plans to carry out a major multi-million pounds redevelopment of the area. Plans were put forward by the port operator to build a five-star hotel, luxury resort casino and a 5,000-seat indoor concert arena on land opposite the Ocean Terminal shopping centre in Leith. The site had previously hosted the 2003 MTV Europe Music Awards in a temporary 6,000-capacity big top arena that was constructed specifically for the event. The former brownfield site has since been redeveloped for a residential housing and apartments scheme, as part of the wider regeneration of the docklands area.

== Loanhead proposal (2019) ==
In December 2019, Lothian Leisure Development and NEC Group published a proposal to build a large 8,000-capacity music venue and conference space in the city. The location of the second proposal for an 'Edinburgh Arena', which would also include a conference centre, retail and leisure space, a cinema and two hotels, was a 30-acre site in green belt land near the Edinburgh City Bypass in Straiton, Loanhead. The proposed arena was designed by Nick Brown Architects, with landscaping by Harrison Stevens; engineering firms Hoare Lea and Buro Happold were also involved in the project.

== Edinburgh Park proposal ==
On 20 November 2023, Anschutz Entertainment Group submitted a planning application to the City of Edinburgh Council for the construction of an 8,500 capacity music arena on a site in Edinburgh Park. The project team includes HOK as the designated architects, Savills for town planning and socio-economics, and Buro Happold.

The proposal was approved by Edinburgh council in June 2024, with construction for the arena expected to begin in early 2025 and with a planned opening in 2027. Naming rights for the arena, which will cover 18,500 square metres across three levels and is known as the "Carlton Arena" during the planning stage, will be sold off to a sponsor prior to its opening.

AEG Europe executive vice president Alistair Wood also revealed that it had considered alternative sites in Leith, Meadowbank and one located near to Edinburgh Airport. In February 2025, it was reported that construction work at the site could start sometime in the first quarter of 2026 so that the arena could open in late 2027 or early 2028. The developers were working through "issues and processes that come with preparing a site like Edinburgh Park", making progress with the design team and were searching to appoint an external contractor to carry out the work. In July 2026, it was reported that AEG Europe had yet to hire a main contractor and supply chain for the construction of the arena. This has resulted in further delays to the project's timeline.

== See also ==
- List of Edinburgh music venues
