= Edinburgh Festival Theatre =

Theatre in Edinburgh, Scotland

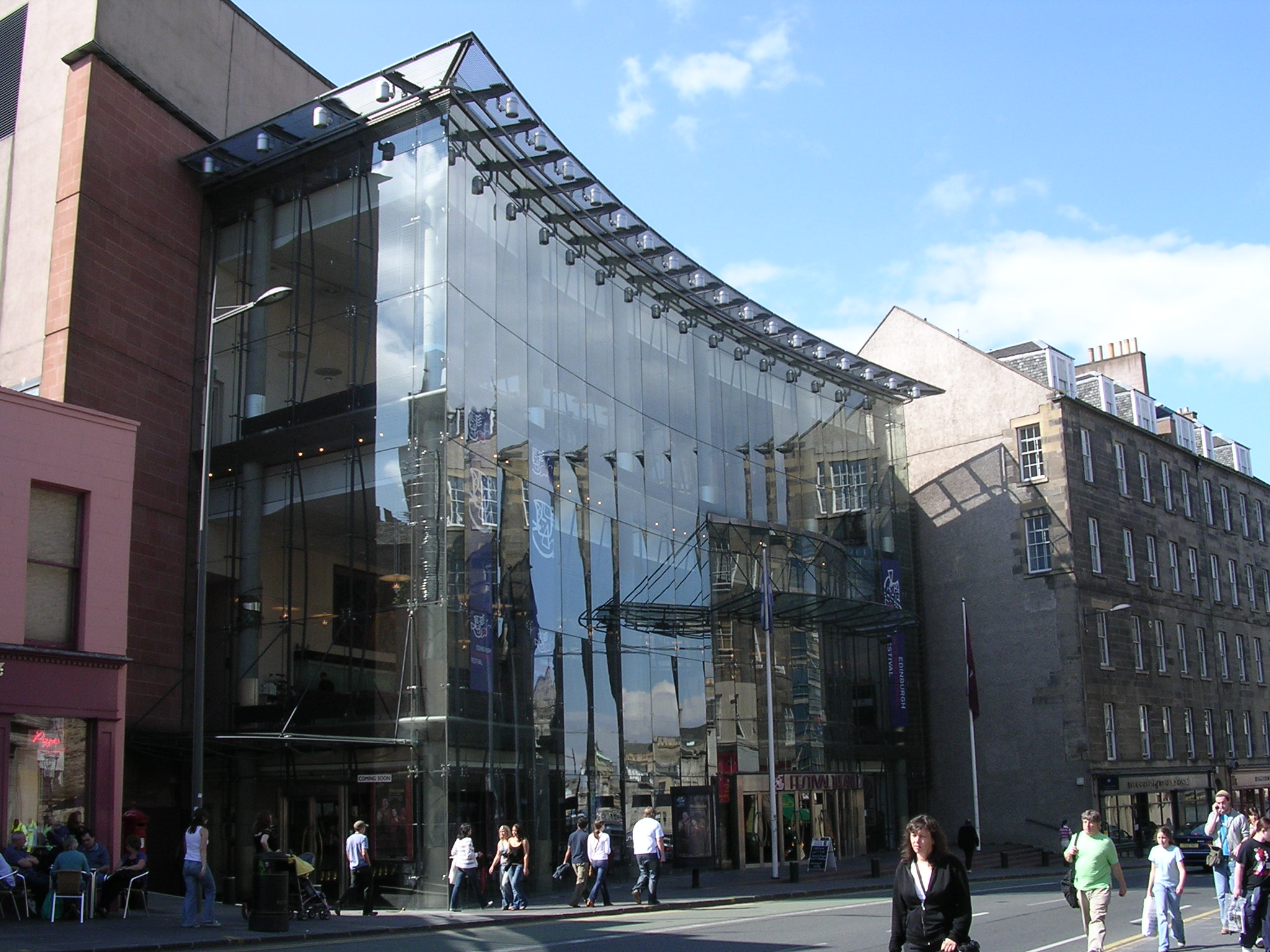
- The Festival Theatre building on Nicolson Street in Edinburgh.
- Interactive map of Edinburgh Festival Theatre
- Former names: Empire Palace Theatre; Empire Theatre
- Address: 13-29 Nicolson Street; Edinburgh; EH8 9FT
- Location: Edinburgh, Scotland
- Coordinates: 55°56′48.12″N 3°11′10.24″W
- Operator: Capital Theatres
- Capacity: 1,915

Construction
- Opened: 7 November 1892
- Reopened: 1911, 1994

Website
- www.capitaltheatres.com/festival

The Edinburgh Festival Theatre (originally Empire Palace Theatre and later shortened to Empire Theatre) is a performing arts venue located on Nicolson Street in Edinburgh, Scotland. It is used primarily for performances of opera and ballet, large-scale musical events, and touring groups. After its most recent renovation in 1994, it seats 1,915. It is one of the major venues of the annual summer Edinburgh International Festival and is the Edinburgh venue for the Scottish Opera and the Scottish Ballet.

== Theatre background and history ==
The present theatre's location is Edinburgh's longest continuous theatre site, for there has been a theatre in that location since 1830. From being Dunedin Hall, the Royal Amphitheatre, Alhambra Music Hall (1862), the Queen's Theatre, Pablo Fanque's Amphitheatre, and Newsome's Circus, the site became the Empire Palace Theatre, the first of the famous Moss Empires’ chain, opening on 7 November 1892. Designed by the great British theatre architect, Frank Matcham, (who built the London Coliseum, among others) its décor was lavish, with elephants with Nubian riders, nymphs and cherubs in abundance on the plasterwork, and it seated 3000 people on four levels.

=== 1911 fire ===
For the following twenty years all the top artists of the day played at the Empire Palace until, on 9 May 1911, there was a disastrous fire on stage. While all 3000 theatre goers escaped safely in about 2.5 minutes, there were nine backstage deaths, including illusionist Sigmund Neuberger, who was then taking his final bow as The Great Lafayette; his body double; and the lion from his act. Film of the aftermath of the fire is held by the National Library of Scotland. The theatre reopened three months after the fire to a rebuilt design, again by Thatcham.

=== Popular performers ===
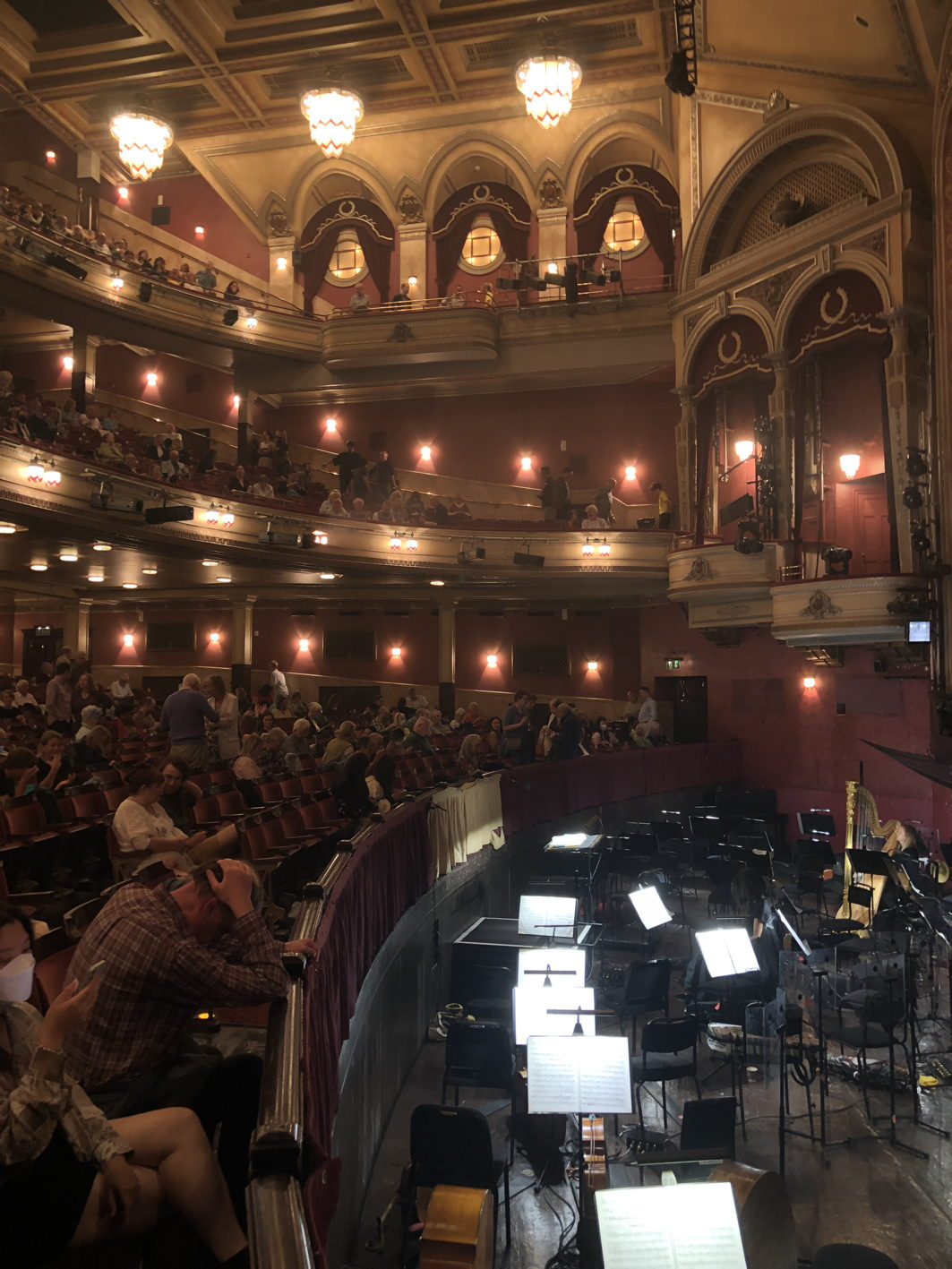
Front of house and orchestra pit of the Edinburgh Festival Theatre

To compete with the growth of cinemas, the theatre was rebuilt in 1928 to plans by architects W. and T. R. Milburn reusing some of Matcham's original design concepts. The theatre reopened on 1 October 1928 with the first production, the musical Show Boat. Between 1928 and 1963 the Empire was a variety, musical and opera house, often including ice shows.

Big names like Harry Lauder, Charles Laughton, Fats Waller, Joe Loss, and Laurel and Hardy appeared, while English comedians Max Wall, Morecambe and Wise and Harry Worth established themselves at the Empire.

In addition to the music hall and popular entertainers who appeared at the Empire, the theatre became a principal venue of the Edinburgh International Festival between 1947 and 1963. It was particularly associated with international ballet and, during the first Festival in 1947, Margot Fonteyn danced in The Sleeping Beauty, while in subsequent years, performances by the Old Vic theatre company, the Royal Ballet and the Royal Opera were presented.

However, for nearly thirty years after 1963 the theatre became a bingo hall, only temporarily serving as a Festival venue. In the early 1970s the venue shortened its name to simply the Empire Theatre and hosted live music events. Bands did not appear until after 11pm - once the bingo players had gone. Emerson, Lake & Palmer (18 December 1971), Free (14 September 1972), Wishbone Ash (9 December 1972) and Focus (11 May 1973) were among the acts appearing. Finally, after its third major remodeling, the Empire Theatre reopened in June 1994 with a glass-fronted structure for the new entrance (created by Law & Dunbar-Nasmith Architects), as the now-renamed Edinburgh Festival Theatre. In 1997, the theatre manager and artistic director Stephen Barry was appointed to shape the rejuvenated venue's future. With the restoration of the Empire Theatre's former 1928 glory, plus a dramatic mix of art nouveau, beaux arts and neo-classicism, and including adequate acoustics, the new theatre serves the artistic needs of the community.

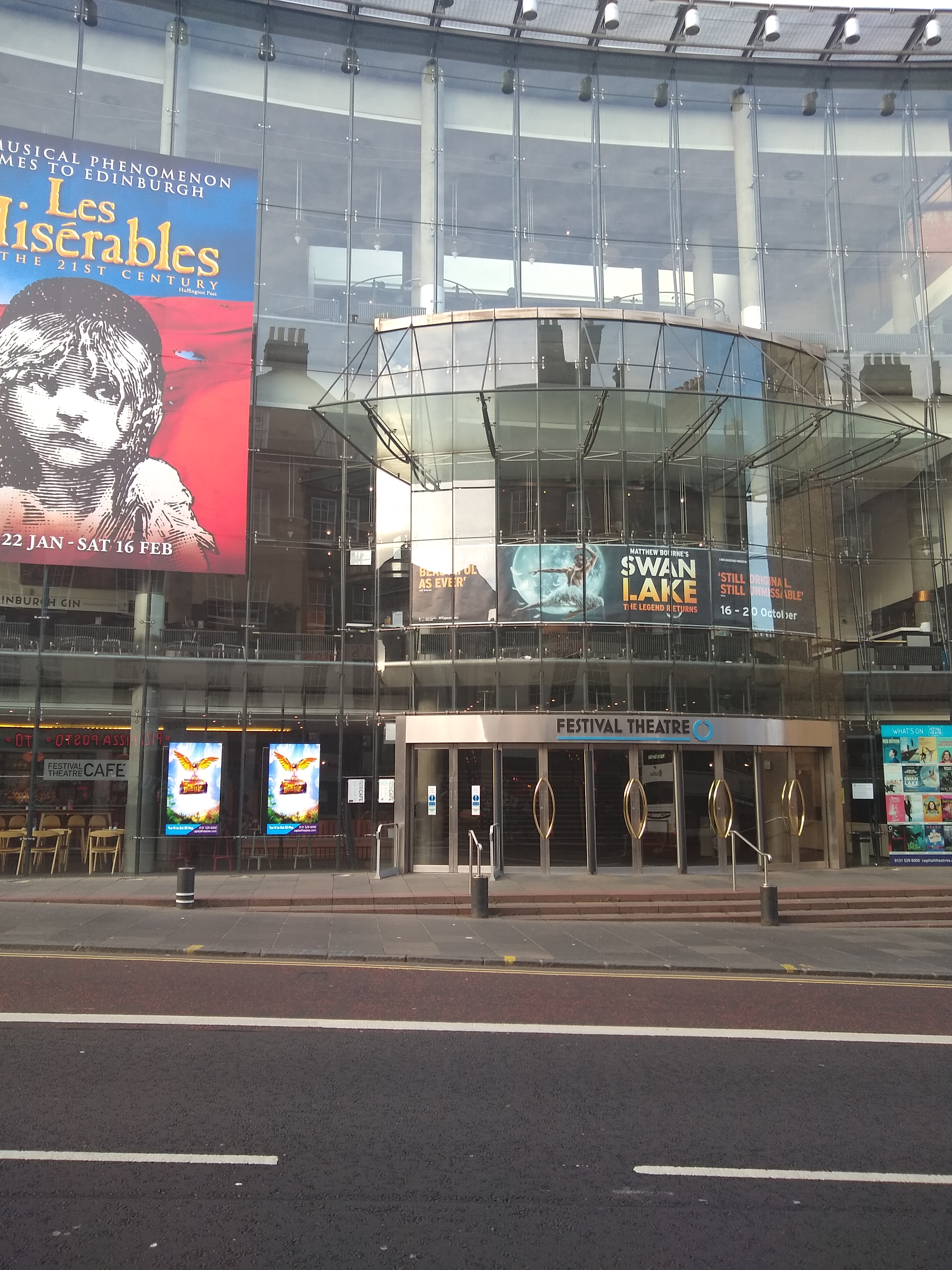
The theatre prior to a production of Les Misérables.

Duncan Hendry, Chief Executive of Festival City Theatres Trust, which later became Capital Theatres, from 2012 to 2019, brought West End productions such as War Horse and Hamilton to the Festival Theatre for the first time. He persuaded Cameron Mackintosh to bring shows such as Miss Saigon, Mary Poppins, and Les Misérables to the theatre too.

== Legend ==
The theatre is said to be haunted by a tall, dark stranger rumoured to be the famous illusionist Sigmund Neuberger, a.k.a. The Great Lafayette, who was one of those who burned to death in the fire at the Empire in 1911.

== See also ==
- List of Edinburgh music venues
