= St. James Centre =

Former shopping centre in Edinburgh, Scotland

Coordinates: 55°57′15.13″N 3°11′18.29″W

St James Centre
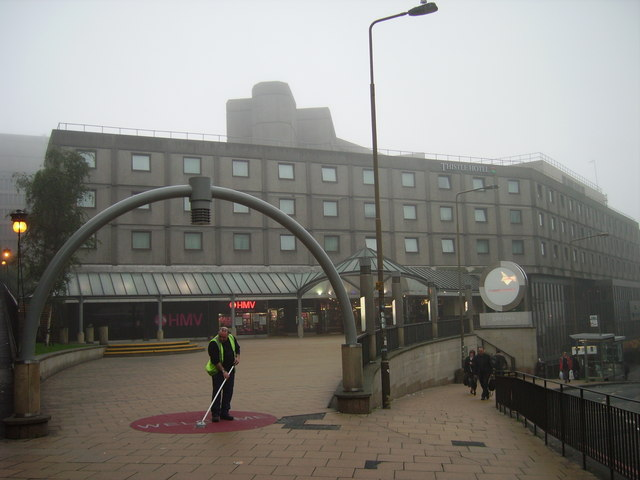
- St James Shopping Centre - main entrance on Leith Street (now demolished)
- Location: Edinburgh, Scotland
- Address: Leith Street, Edinburgh EH1
- Opened: 1973
- Closed: October 16, 2016
- Demolished: 2017–2018
- Owner: Nuveen Real Estate
- Architect: Hugh Martin & Partners
- Num. of stores: 60+
- Num. of anchor tenants: 1
- Floors: 2
- Parking: Multi-storey car park
- Public transit: Edinburgh Trams (St Andrew Square), Edinburgh Waverley railway station

The St. James Centre, later re-branded as St. James Shopping, was a shopping centre next to the former New St. Andrew House office building for the Scottish Office, in Edinburgh, Scotland. It was initially designed by Burke Martin Partnership in 1964 but was completed by architects Ian G Cooke and Hugh Martin of Hugh Martin & Partners after Martin's partnership with Ian Burke ceased in 1969.

The Brutalist architecture of the government offices, atop the shopping centre, made it one of Edinburgh's most unloved buildings, but the shopping centre was a popular and busy shopping location. All of the shops in the centre, with the exception of the John Lewis department store, closed in 2016 in preparation for demolition, which has since been completed; work on extensions to John Lewis has also been completed.

The centre had over 60 stores, cafés, restaurants and a food court. In the 2010s, it boasted many popular stores such as River Island, Burton, HMV, Wallis, Next, Sports Direct, JD Sports, Subway, Game and Dorothy Perkins.

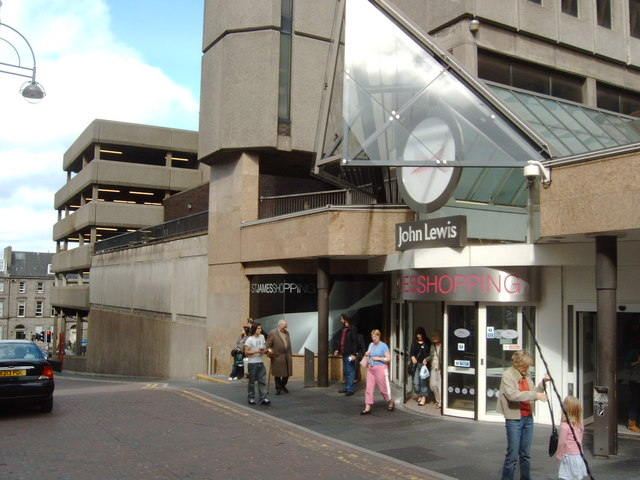
Side entrance on Elder Street (now demolished)

== Redevelopment ==
An £850m redevelopment of the former shopping centre, New St. Andrew's House office and hotel by its owners, Nuveen Real Estate, was undertaken. The existing 1973 building was demolished, making way for a three-storey, glass-roofed, crescent-shaped building designed by Allan Murray Architects. Edinburgh City Council planners gave the plans approval in July 2015 despite objections from conservation groups concerned about the possible impact on the city's World Heritage status.

Construction work was expected to start in 2015 with completion of the retail elements by 2021. In November 2015 it was reported that the centre would close in late 2016 and that an agreement had been reached with the John Lewis, with the store remain open throughout work on the scheme and a refurbished department store as part of the finished St James development.

On 15 October 2016, the Edinburgh Evening News reported that the St James Centre would close its doors on 16 October 2016, with demolition work to begin within weeks.

The new St James Quarter (initially named Edinburgh St James) replacement was due to be completed by 2020, with the hotel opening in 2021. The replacement opened in its first phase in June 2021, with additional stores and a cinema opening in 2022. The hotels opened later in 2023, due to small delays in its construction as a result of the coronavirus pandemic.
