= Capitol Theatre, Aberdeen =

Former cinema and concert venue in Aberdeen, Scotland

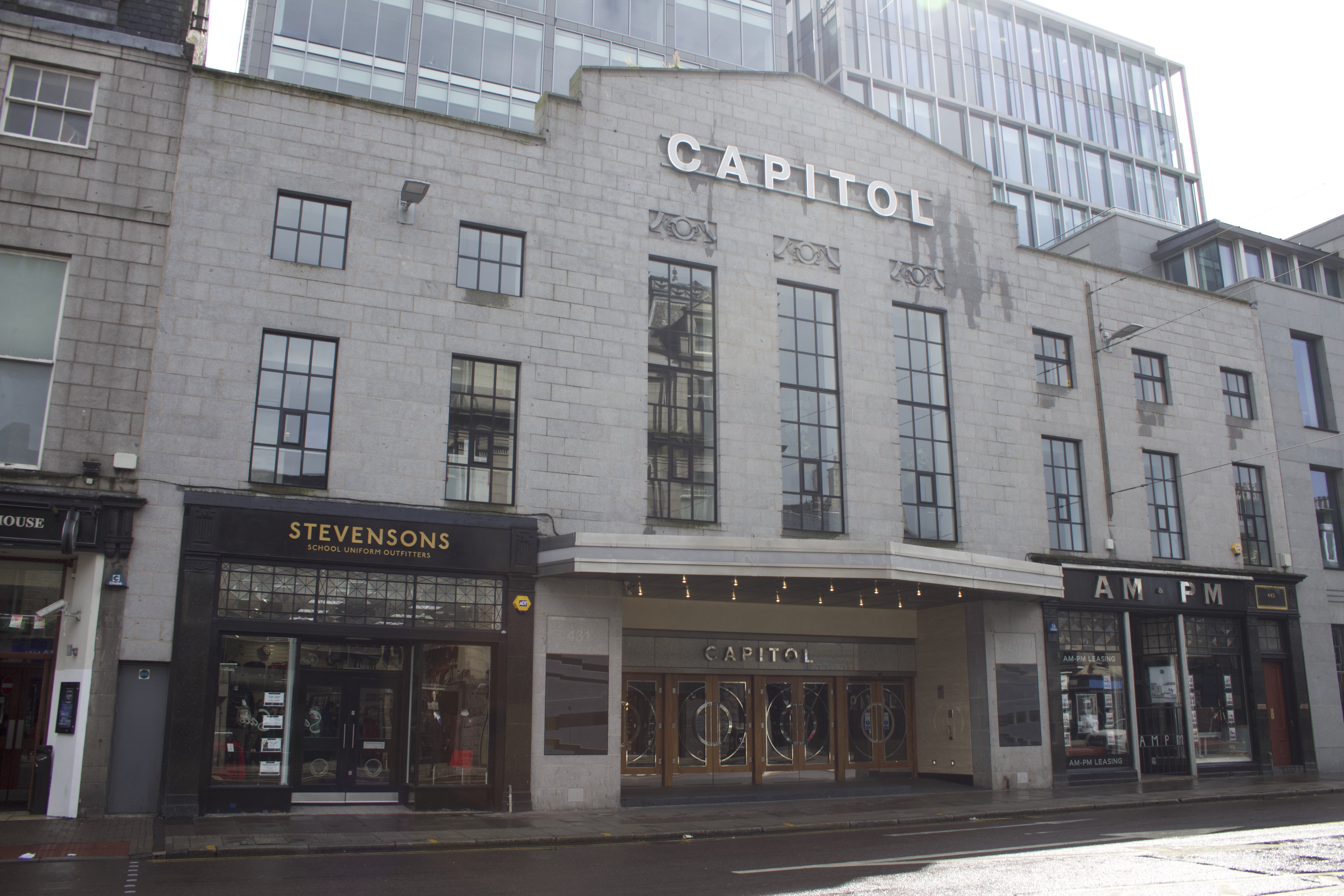
Capitol Building, Aberdeen, August 2019

The Capitol Theatre is a former cinema and concert venue at 431 Union Street in Aberdeen, Scotland.

The Capitol opened on Saturday, 4 February 1933, on the site of the earlier Electric Cinema. It seated 2,100, to the plans of architects Alexander G.R. Mackenzie and Clement George. In 1933, the Capitol was Aberdeen's most luxurious cinema, with full stage facilities, a Holophane lighting system and a Compton Organ.

In addition to functioning as a cinema, The Capitol featured regular stage shows and these gradually became the venue's focus. The venue showed its final film in 1995 and closed in 1998, with the exception of a bar at the front of the building.

In the early 2000s, The Capitol was converted into a nightclub. At this stage, the rear section of the building was largely remodelled and many of the remaining features removed. The nightclub closed in 2009.

The Capitol is a category B listed building. In September 2013, planning permission was granted for Knight Property Group to renovate the front third of the building and replace the derelict auditorium with a modern ten storey building. The building is now open as office space over 9 levels and 72,600 sq. ft.

== Construction ==
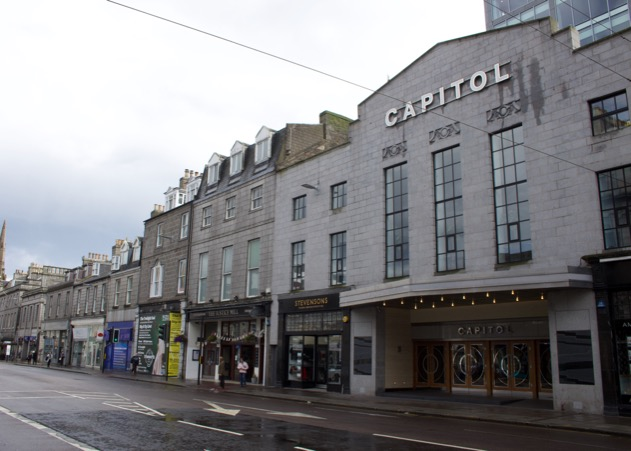
Capitol Building, Aberdeen, August 2019

Plans were prepared for a new cinema on the site of the Electric Cinema by Clement George in 1927, at the request of owners Aberdeen Picture Palaces. George adapted them in 1931 and formed a partnership with fellow Aberdeen architect A. Marshall MacKenzie. George died in February 1932 before his plans could be realised, and Marshall MacKenzie's son, Alexander G. R. MacKenzie, took over. He adapted George's plans, taking a Modernist influence.

David Stokes was enlisted to design the building's interior, redesigned from the original plans to his specifications. Of the building's total estimated cost of £60-70,000, £40,000 of this is thought to have been spent on the interiors alone.

Alexander 'Crooky' Cruickshank, the project's consulting engineer, showed architectural students around the completed building. Of particular interest was the 38-ton balcony cantilever, the largest in the North East of Scotland at the time.

== See also ==
- Aberdeen theatres and concert halls
