= Edinburgh Corn Exchange =

Municipal building in Edinburgh, Scotland

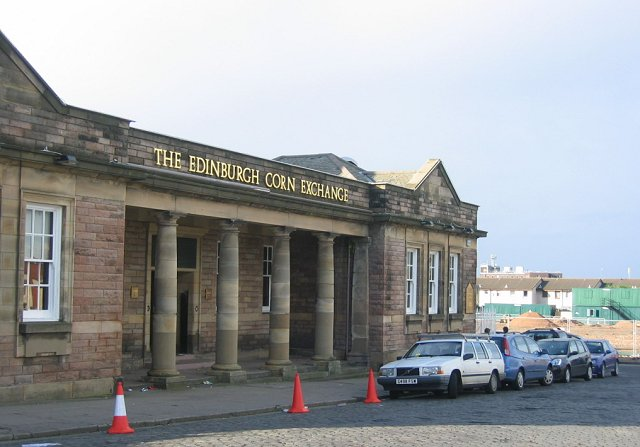
- Edinburgh Corn Exchange

- Shown in Edinburgh
- 55.9273°N 3.2479°W
- Location: New Market Road, Edinburgh

History
- Built: 1910

Site notes
- Architect: James A. Williamson
- Architectural style: Neoclassical style

Listed Building – Category B
- Official name: 11, New Market Road, Corn Exchange
- Designated: 16 June 1992
- Reference no.: LB30282

Edinburgh Corn Exchange is an events and concert venue located in New Market Road in Edinburgh, Scotland. The structure, which was commissioned as a corn exchange, is a Category B listed building.

== History ==
The first location where merchants could trade in agricultural products in Edinburgh was on the High Street. Cattle, horse, and grain markets moved to the Grassmarket in the 15th century, and it was at the corn exchange in the Grassmarket, which was designed by David Cousin and completed in the mid-19th century, that the Prime Minister, William Ewart Gladstone, made a speech in 1884. In the late 19th century civic officials sought to relocate the markets out of the city centre: the site they selected was in the Chesser area of the city some 2.5 miles (4.0 km) southwest of the city centre.

The new building was designed by the City Superintendent of Works, James A. Williamson, in the neoclassical style, built in ashlar stone and was officially opened by the Lord Lieutenant of Midlothian, Archibald Primrose, 5th Earl of Rosebery, on 23 June 1910. The design involved a symmetrical main frontage of eleven bays facing northeast onto New Market Road, with the end sections projected forward as pavilions. The central section of five bays featured a loggia formed by four Doric order columns supporting an entablature, a cornice and a parapet. At the back of the loggia was a central doorway with an architrave flanked by two single windows on either side. The end sections of three bays each were fenestrated with sash windows and surmounted by an entablature, a cornice, a parapet, and a small central pediment on each side.

The use of the building as a corn exchange declined significantly in the wake of the Great Depression of British Agriculture. After a long period of disuse, it was acquired by Marco's Leisure in 1992 and, after a major refurbishment, re-opened as an events and concert venue in 1999. Meanwhile, the area to the southwest of the building, i.e. behind the building, was developed as the Corn Exchange Village with facilities such as ten pin bowling, an indoor mini golf course, 5-a-side and 7-a-side football pitches, and a sports bar.

Performers at the corn exchange have included the rock band, Blur, in 1999, the rock band, Manic Street Preachers, in 2007 and the Indie rock band, Kaiser Chiefs, in 2009. There were protests outside the corn exchange when the UK Independence Party leader, Nigel Farage, arrived to give a speech in May 2014. The venue was acquired by the Academy Music Group in August 2021 and renamed O2 Academy Edinburgh.

In April 2025, the building underwent a rebrand and returned to its original name of Edinburgh Corn Exchange. It remained under the ownership of Academy Music Group.

== See also ==
- List of Edinburgh music venues
