= Aberdeen Performing Arts =

Cultural charitable trust

Aberdeen Performing Arts is a charitable trust founded in 2004 to take over the running and management of His Majesty's Theatre and the Music Hall. In 2008, the company's portfolio grew with the acquisition of The Lemon Tree after its brief closure. The buildings are still owned by Aberdeen City Council.

Sharon Burgess was named CEO in 2023, succeeding Jane Spiers.
