= His Majesty's Theatre, Aberdeen =

Theatre in Aberdeen, Scotland

His Majesty's Theatre

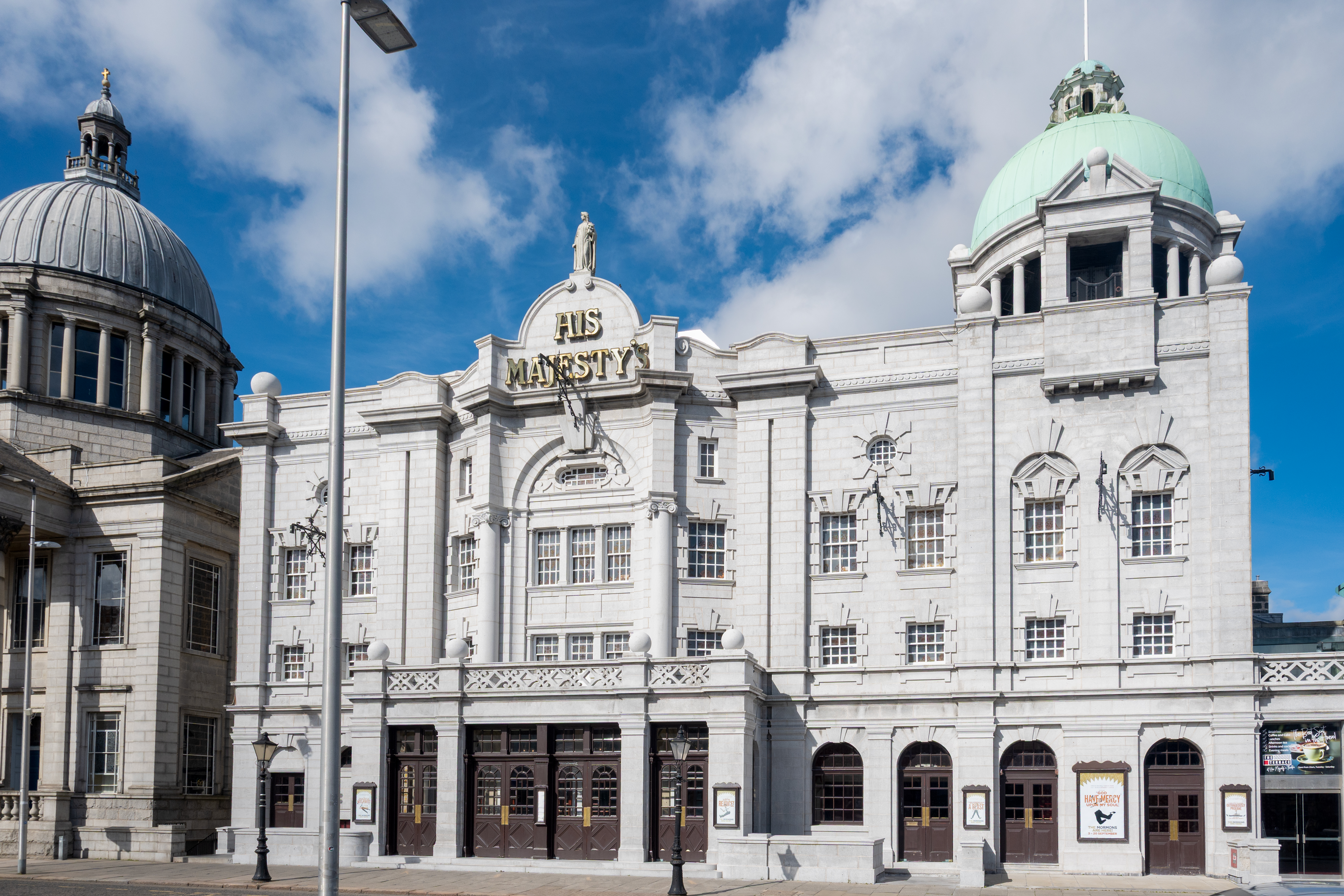
- Interactive map of His Majesty's Theatre
- Address: Rosemount Viaduct; Aberdeen; Scotland
- Coordinates: 57.148°N 2.1049°W
- Owner: Aberdeen City Council
- Operator: Aberdeen Performing Arts
- Capacity: 1,400; 2,300 (1906)
- Type: Regional producing and receiving theatre
- Designation: Category A listed

Construction
- Built: 1904–1906
- Opened: 3 December 1906
- Renovated: 1933; 1980–1982
- Expanded: 2005
- Architect: Frank Matcham

Website
- www.aberdeenperformingarts.com

His Majesty's Theatre is a theatre in Aberdeen, Scotland, and the largest in north-east Scotland, seating more than 1,400. It stands on Rosemount Viaduct, opposite the city's Union Terrace Gardens, and was designed by Frank Matcham and opened in 1906.

== History ==
The granite-clad theatre is the brainchild of Robert Arthur, of Glasgow, who started his group of theatres in the 1880s focusing on Her Majesty's Theatre, Dundee, and others in England. He took a lease of Her Majesty's Opera House, Aberdeen (later named the Tivoli Theatre) on Guild Street from 1891 and started to look for a site to build one according to his own specifications. His plans for Rosemount Viaduct were submitted to Aberdeen City Council in 1901. Construction of the theatre started in 1904 and was completed in 1906. His Majesty's Theatre opened on 3 December 1906.

Now with theatres in Scotland, and in England, such as the Theatre Royal, Newcastle, Robert Arthur floated his new company on the Stock Exchange in 1897. He staged the whole range of plays, opera, revues and pantomimes until the company ran out of funds in 1912. At this point Michael Simons of the Theatre Royal, Glasgow, chairman and founder of Howard & Wyndham Ltd, became chairman of the Robert Arthur group with the Arthur theatres now to be operated under the same directors and managers of Howard & Wyndham.

Robert Arthur Theatres Ltd, through Michael Simons, sold the theatre in 1923 to Walter Gilbert, managing director of the Tivoli Theatre. On his death it was bought in 1932 by Councillor James F Donald, a prominent figure in the cinema and dance hall business. James Donald refurbished the venue and introduced features such as external neon lighting, a cinema projector and a revolving stage. Gilbert's son and the Donald family managed it until 1939, when ownership, programming and production passed to Howard & Wyndham Ltd, of which Peter Donald became a director. This arrangement continued until the late 1960s, when Peter Donald and his family bought the theatre back.

Unlike the London theatre, and similar to His Majesty's Theatre in Perth, Western Australia, the Aberdeen theatre did not change its title to Her Majesty's during Elizabeth II's reign. These two theatres remained the only two in the world to bear that name during the Queen's reign.

Aberdeen City Council bought the theatre in 1975, the Council duly allocating £3.5 million to ensure the building's survival. After 23 months of closure the theatre was reopened in 1982 by King Charles III (then Prince Charles, Duke of Rothesay).

=== Extension and refurbishment (2005) ===
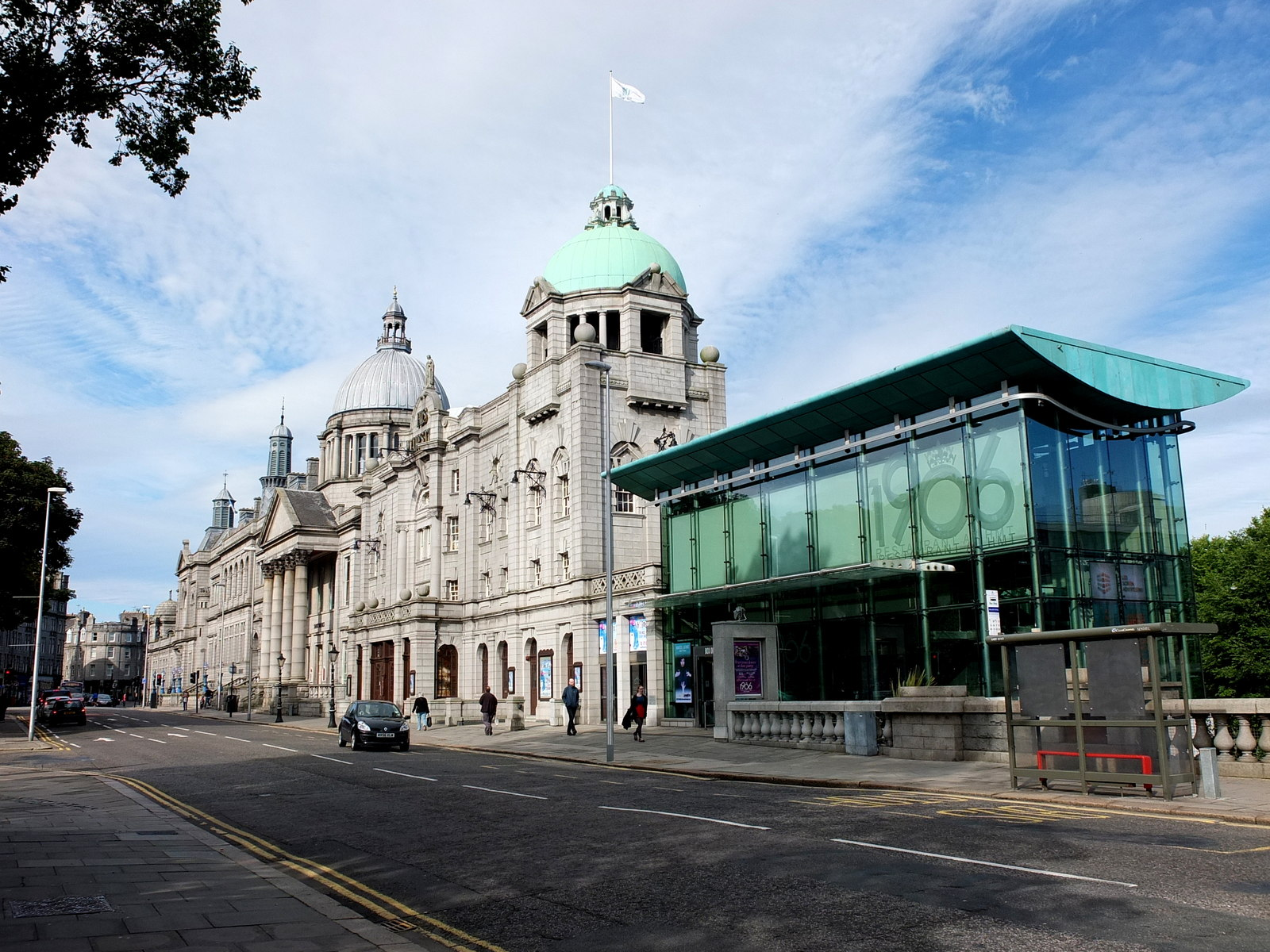
The 2005 glass and copper clad extension sitting to the right of the original building

During the late 1990s, Aberdeen City Council recognised that the theatre required modernisation. It lacked a cafe, restaurant or corporate hospitality offering, the bar and toilet facilities were inadequate and the back-of-house space did not offer any rehearsal area, dance studio or workshops. Operational equipment, such as the scenery hoist, and parts of the building fabric were also deteriorating. A proposal to refurbish the existing facilities and extend the theatre was developed by the council's in-house architects, with LDN Architects appointed as architectural consultants and the Adapt Trust advising on accessibility. Construction of the extension began in August 2003, with the theatre closing completely in March 2004 to allow refurbishment works of the existing part of the building. The theatre reopened in August 2005, with an opening ceremony taking place on 8 September which was attended by Prince Edward.

The extension is a five-storey triangular structure built on the car park to the east of the existing building, with three storeys below the level of Rosemount Viaduct. It was constructed from Kemnay granite to match the original building facade and features a large glass facade facing Rosemount Viaduct. The choice of a glazed structure was in response to the desire to enliven the frontage of the building and highlight the activity within. The roof is finished in pre-patinated copper to match the dome on the original part of the building.

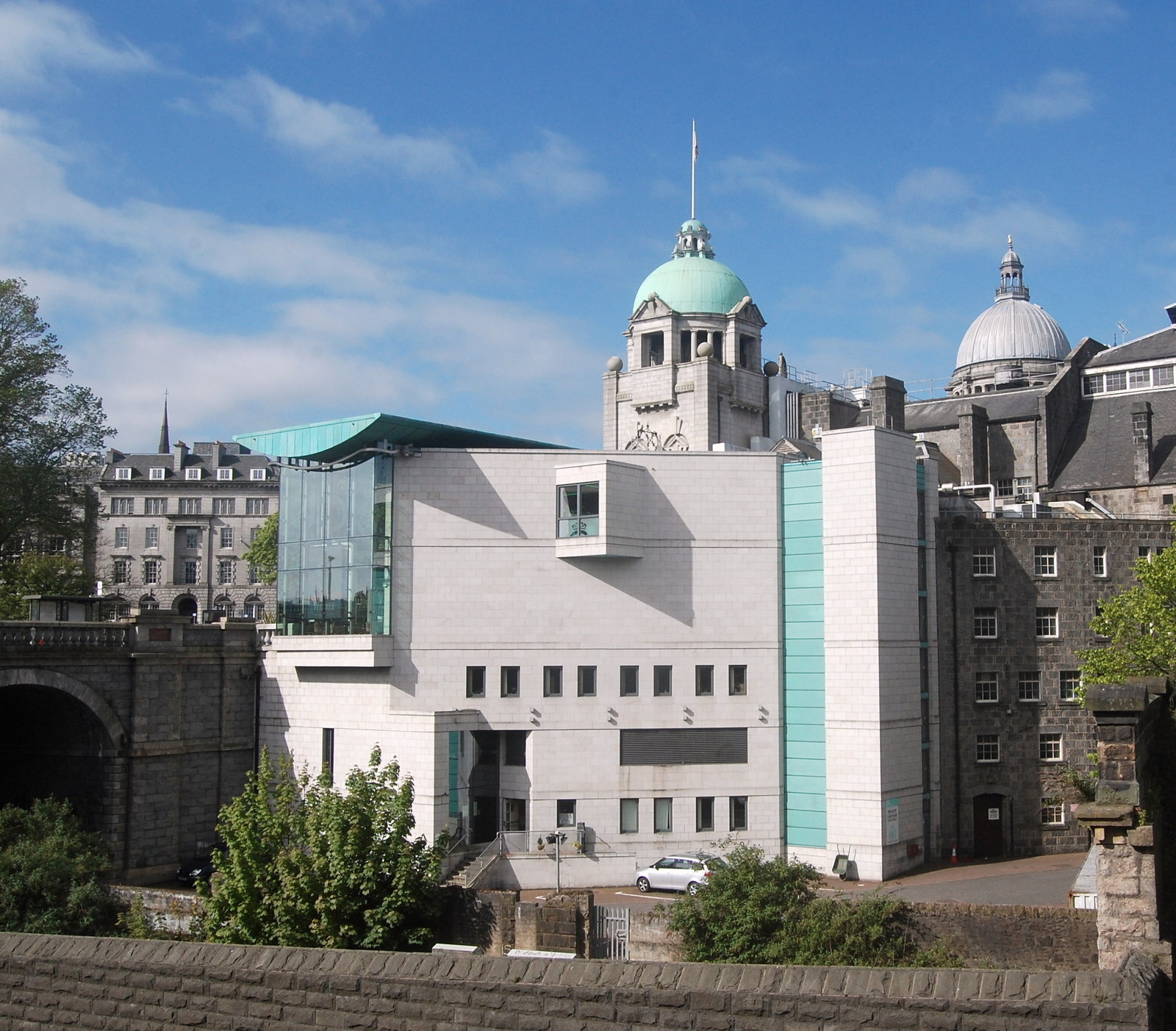
The side and rear of the 2005 extension

Accommodated within the extension are new front-of-house facilities, including a box office, restaurant, coffee shop and corporate hospitality area. The auditorium seating was re-upholstered with increased leg-room provided in the stalls by replacing the rows and offsetting seats. Back-of-house facilities were also improved, with upgraded technical and audio-visual equipment installed, a new green room, enhanced dressing rooms and a purpose-built rehearsal and education area. A key aim of the project was to make the building fully accessible to those with disabilities and to that end, the project included the installation of two lifts, provision of accessible toilets & dressing rooms and creation of space for wheelchairs across the different levels in the auditorium.

The project cost £7.9m and was jointly funded by Aberdeen City Council, the Scottish Arts Council Capital Lottery Fund (£2m), Scottish Enterprise Grampian (£375,000) and private sponsorship. It was recognised with a commendation in the 2006 Civic Trust Awards and was a joint winner in the major buildings category of the Society of Chief Architects for Local Authorities' Civic Building of the Year Award 2006. The Scottish Executive featured the project as a case study in its 2007 policy document on architecture, describing it as a "thoughtful integration of the old and new" with the improved facilities and comfort conditions considered to significantly increase the theatre's attractiveness as a venue for theatregoers and performers alike. The case study concluded "This is an excellent example of public architecture carried out by the City Council's in-house team."

On its centenary in 2006, the theatre was "twinned" with His Majesty's Theatre in Perth, Western Australia.

The '1906 Restaurant' was refurbished in 2022, with £675,000 of funding from Scottish Enterprise and Aberdeen City Council. The works included changes to the theatre foyer and circulation space. The updated facilities were opened in December 2022, with the new bar-cafe renamed 'The Terrace'. The refurbishment of the Terrace Bar won the project of the year; interior; and public/commercial awards at the Aberdeen Society of Architects' 2023 design awards.

== Architecture ==
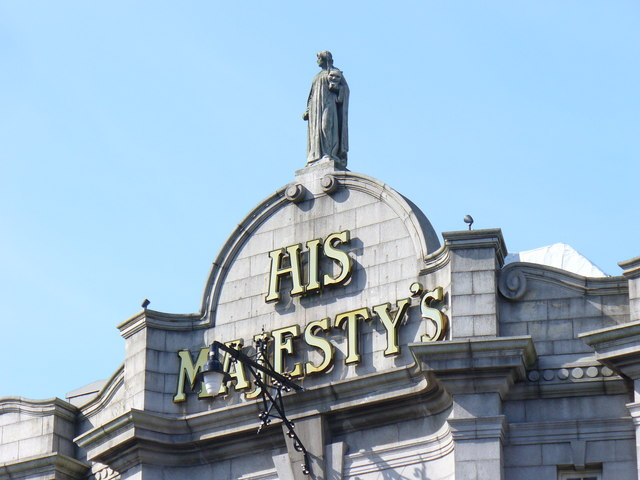
Detail of the front elevation of the theatre, featuring a statue depicting Tragedy and Comedy

The original building comprises four storeys and is constructed from Kemnay granite in an ashlar finish on the primary elevation and Tillyfourie granite to the sides and rear. It features a copper domed tower at its eastern end and a reinforced concrete statue of Tragedy and Comedy at the top of the main facade. Historic Environment Scotland describe the building as having a "remarkable finely detailed Free Renaissance style" with a "spacious well preserved interior, handsomely treated throughout in mixed baroque and neo-Jacobean strapwork decoration, much alabaster and marble".

On 8 November 1973, the building was category A listed as a building of special architectural or historic interest.

The theatre sits alongside the Central Library which was built in 1891 and St Mark's Church dating from 1892. Together they are known locally as 'Education, Salvation and Damnation'.

2026 Commemorative Plaque on His Majesty's Theatre

On June 26th 2026 a plaque was unveiled on the theatre frontage by the Frank Matcham Society.

== Management and activities ==
The theatre is managed by Aberdeen Performing Arts, on behalf of Aberdeen City council, which also runs the Music Hall, and the Lemon Tree.

The theatre is regularly visited by Scotland's national arts companies and hosts performances from other major companies. Until 2017, when it ceased, it hosted events in the annual Aberdeen International Youth Festival.

== Sources ==
- Building our Legacy – Statement on Scotland's Architecture Policy (PDF). Scottish Executive. 2007. pp. 78–79. ISBN 978-0-7559-5276-2.
- Guide to British Theatres 1750-1950, John Earl and Michael Sell pp. 2–3 (Theatres Trust, 2000) ISBN 0-7136-5688-3
