= Kings Theatre, Kilmarnock =

Live theater and cinema venue, Scotland (1904–1934)

Coordinates: 55.605°N 4.497°W

The Kings Theatre was a theatre and latterly a cinema in the town of Kilmarnock in what is now East Ayrshire, Scotland.
