= Tivoli Theatre, Aberdeen =

Theatre in Aberdeen, Scotland

Coordinates: 57.1451°N 2.0975°W

Tivoli Theatre
- Her Majesty's Theatre
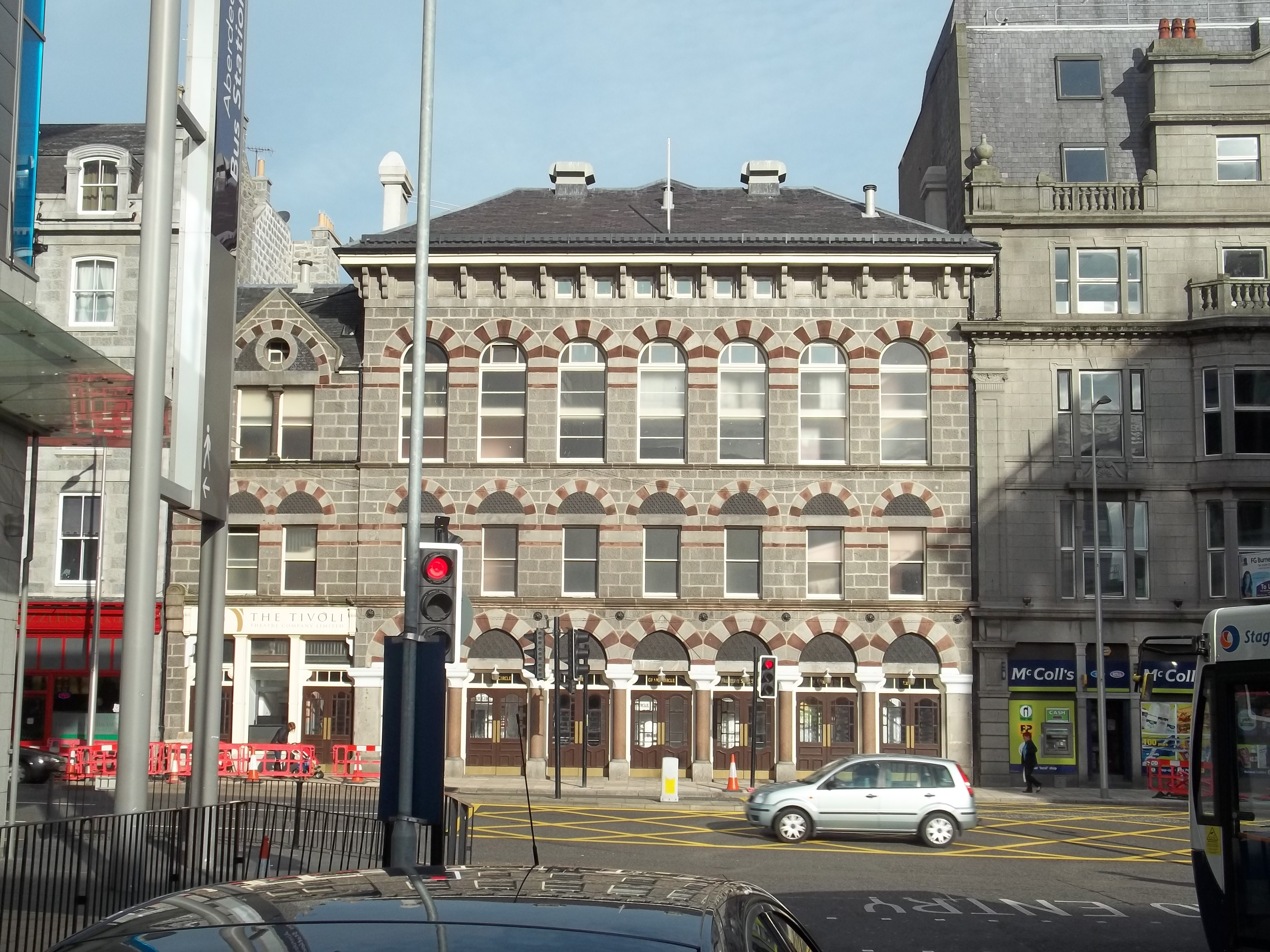
- Interactive map of Tivoli Theatre
- Address: Guild Street; Aberdeen; United Kingdom
- Owner: The Tivoli Theatre Company Ltd.
- Capacity: 530
- Current use: Theatre, being restored

Construction
- Opened: 1872, 2013
- Closed: 1966
- Rebuilt: 1897, 1909, 1938
- Architects: James Matthews, Charles J. Phipps, Frank Matcham

Listed Building – Category A
- Official name: Tivoli Theatre
- Designated: 12 January 1967
- Reference no.: LB20333

The Tivoli Theatre is a theatre in Aberdeen, Scotland, opened in 1872 as Her Majesty's Theatre and was built by the Aberdeen Theatre and Opera House Company Ltd, under architects James Matthews of Aberdeen and Charles J. Phipps, a London-based architect brought in to consult. The auditorium was rebuilt in 1897 by theatre architect Frank Matcham, but then closed temporarily in 1906, following the opening of the larger His Majesty's Theatre. The smaller theatre was extensively reconstructed in 1909, again by Frank Matcham, and re-opened in July 1910 as the Tivoli. The Tivoli was refurbished again in 1938.

The theatre became a bingo hall in 1966. In the mid 1980s plans were made to improve the bingo-oriented facilities and the building, but little was actually done. The building finally closed for bingo in 1998 and became disused.

From 2000, the building had been in private hands, and as of 2006, attempts by the Tivoli Theatre Trust to purchase the building were unsuccessful. In April 2006, some cosmetic preservative work was observed at the building.

On 10 July 2009, the owner of the Tivoli Theatre decided to sell the property to Mr Brian Hendry. On 16 July 2009 during a meeting with the Aberdeen Tivoli Theatre Trust, Mr Hendry outlined his intention to operate the Tivoli Theatre on a profit-making basis as a mid-scale venue with ancillary facilities, through the Tivoli Theatre Company Ltd. The building was restored. The reopening was funded by many businesses.

The Tivoli was listed on the Buildings at Risk Register for Scotland.

On 19 April 2012, it was announced that the Theatre had been made wind and watertight and that its frontage had been restored to its former integrity. The next phase of the restoration was set to update the interior with a 450-seat auditorium, a cafe and a gallery.

The theatre reopened on 25 October 2013 with Inferno, an original play by Thomas Bywater which ran from 25–27 October 2013. On 7 December 2013 Attic theatre's production of Robin Hood and The Babes In The Wood became the first Pantomime at the theatre in 50 years and was followed by Sleeping Beauty in 2014 and Dick Whittington in 2015. Attic return in 2016 with Aladdin. Joseph Purdy Productions became the first UK touring pantomime to visit the Tivoli in July 2018 with Rapunzel. All three levels of the theatre are now open.

The theatre was closed during the COVID-19 pandemic and reopened in August 2021.

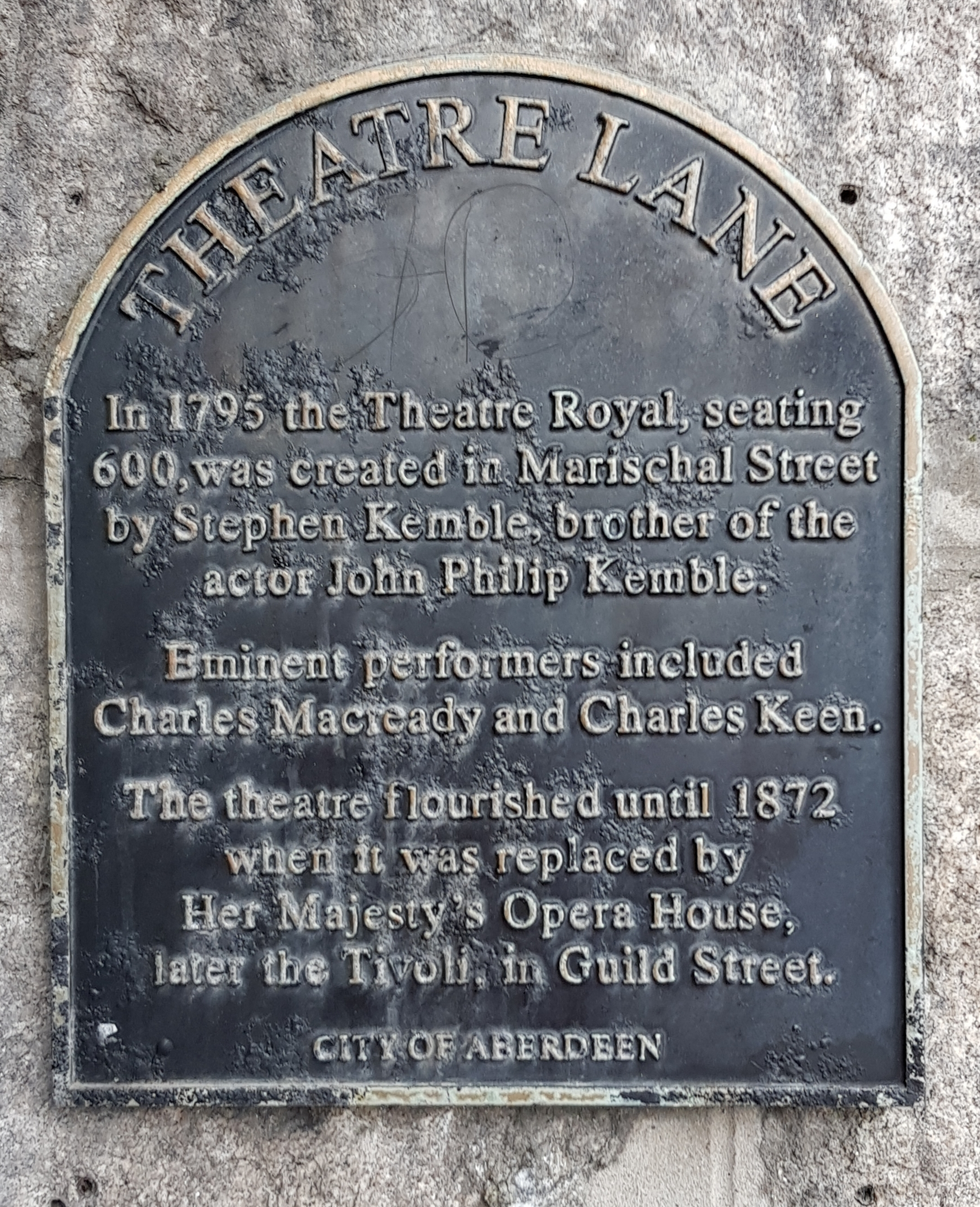
A plaque on Regent Quay in Aberdeen commemorating the Theatre Royal in Marischal Street, which was the forerunner of the Tivoli Theatre.

== Predecessors ==
A plaque erected by Aberdeen City Council at Theatre Lane states: "In 1795 the Theatre Royal, seating 600, was created in Marischal Street by Stephen Kemble, brother of the actor John Philip Kemble. Eminent performers included Charles Macready and Charles Keen. The theatre flourished until 1872 when it was replaced by Her Majesty's Opera House, later the Tivoli, in Guild Street."

== See also ==
- Calum Kennedy
