= Music Hall, Aberdeen =

Concert hall in Scotland

Coordinates: 57°8′42″N 2°6′18″W

Music Hall
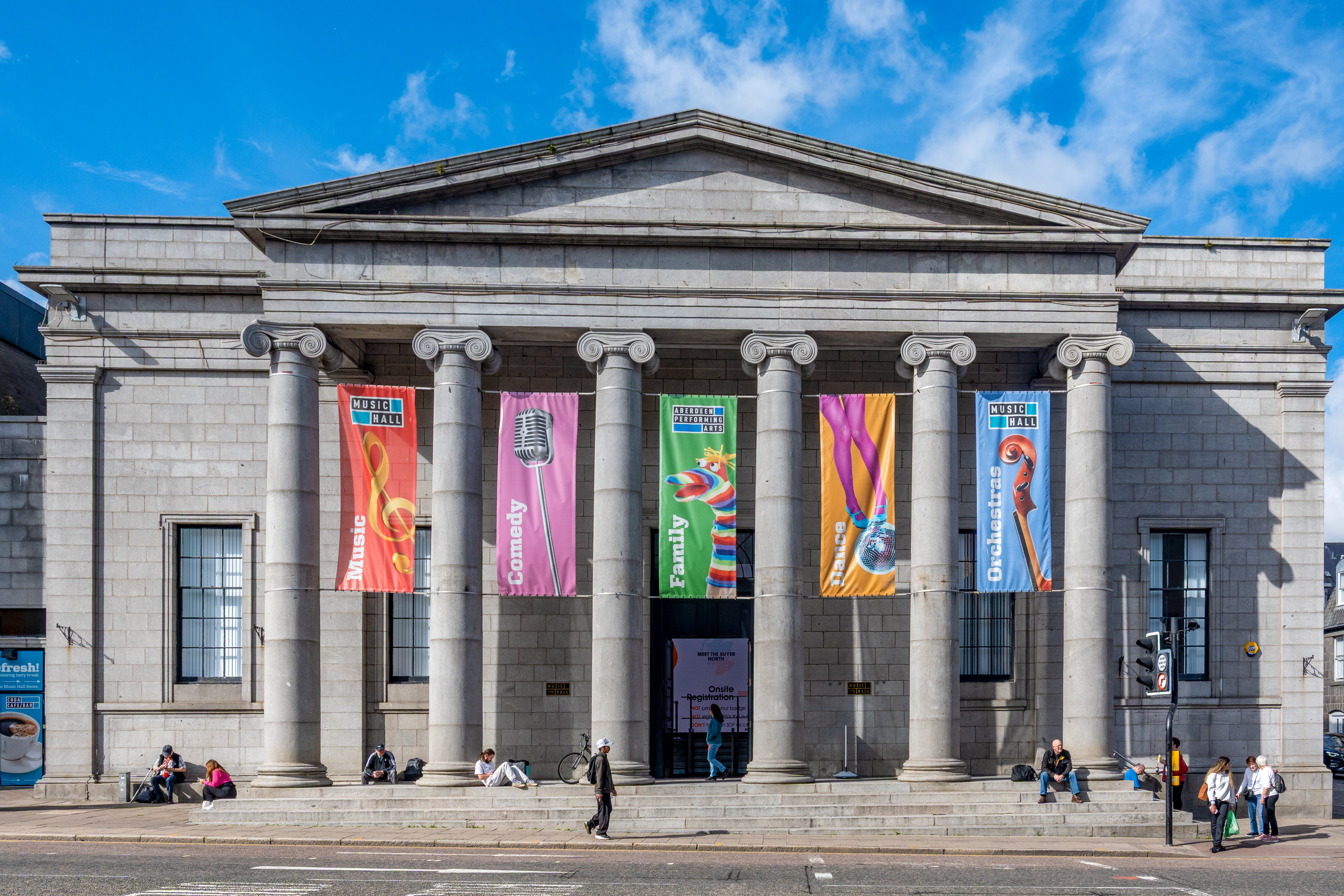
- Interactive map of Music Hall
- Address: Union Street; Aberdeen; Scotland
- Owner: Aberdeen Performing Arts
- Capacity: 1,281 (Seated)
- Type: Performing arts centre
- Current use: Concerts, comedy, variety, exhibitions, art & craft fairs

Construction
- Opened: 1852
- Architect: Archibald Simpson

Website
- www.aberdeenperformingarts.com/music-hall/

Listed Building – Category A
- Official name: Music Hall
- Designated: 28 February 1962
- Reference no.: LB19991

The Music Hall is a concert hall in Aberdeen, Scotland, formerly the city's Assembly Rooms, located on Union Street in the city centre.

== History ==
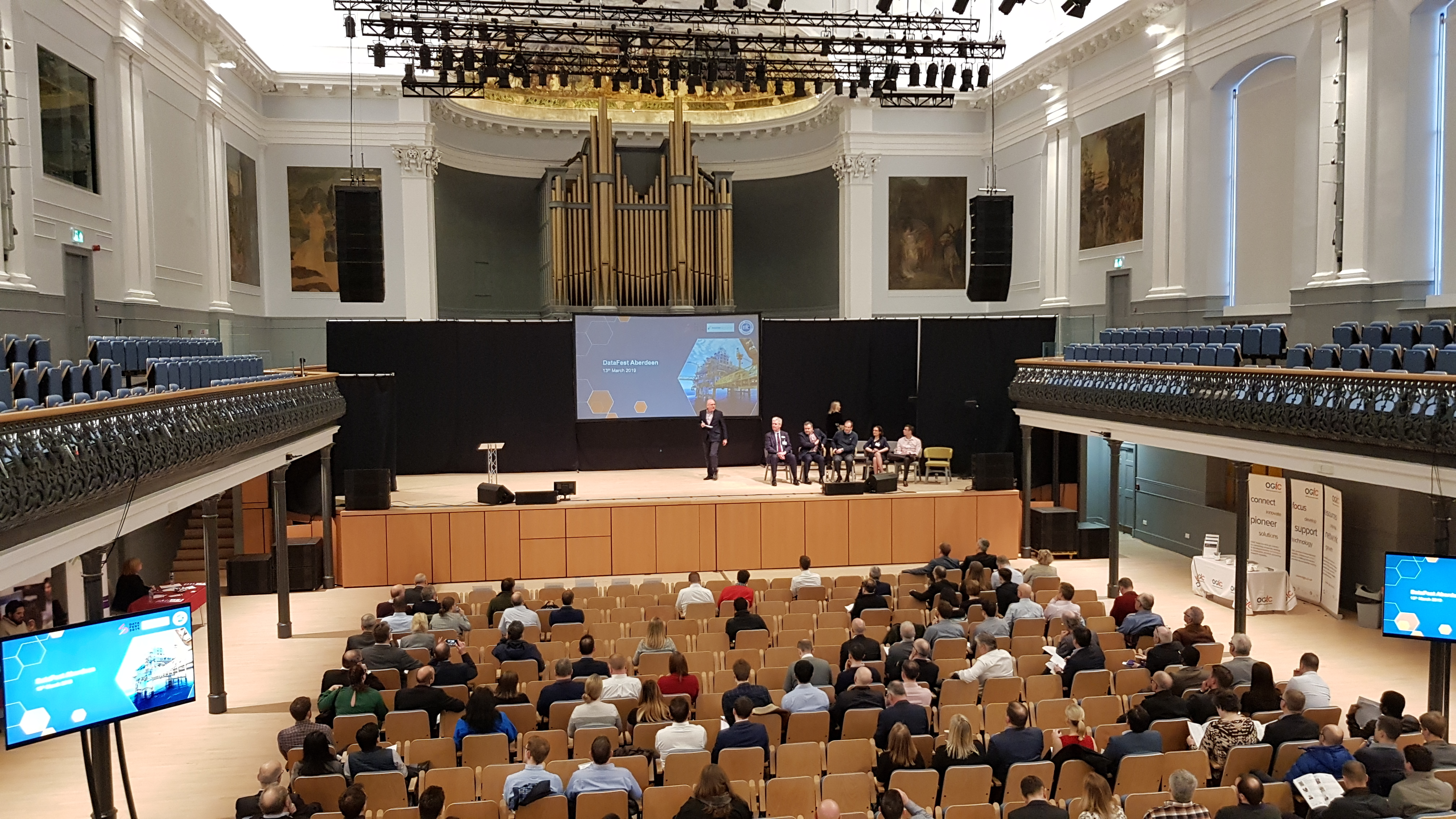
Interior of Music Hall

The venue was designed in 1820 by Archibald Simpson, a notable Aberdeen architect, and cost £11,500 when it was originally constructed in 1822. It was opened to the public as a concert hall in 1859. On 28 September 1896, the building hosted the first cinema screening in Aberdeen, which featured footage of Highland and serpentine dancing along with scenes of Westminster Bridge, a coronation and a workshop.

The building was renovated in the 1980s. It was closed for further extensive renovation in 2016 with a £9 million investment, and reopened in December 2018.

=== Suffragette activism ===
Aberdeen Music Hall was the scene of a suffragette activist incident on 19 December 1907, when protesters disrupted a visit from the then Chancellor of the Exchequer, Henry Asquith. This resulted in a fight in the orchestra pit and the suffragettes being thrown out. It also compromised Caroline Phillips' position as honorary secretary of the Aberdeen branch of the Women's Social and Political Union due to her opposition to this protest – she was ultimately dismissed in 1909.

Another incident occurred in 1912 when women hid with 'explosives' which turned out to be toy guns, when then Chancellor of the Exchequer David Lloyd George was due to speak. The three women were arrested and imprisoned.

== War memorial ==
There is a bronze plaque inside the lobby of the Music Hall, bearing the names of all those from Aberdeen who served in the Spanish Civil War (1936–1939). The memorial was removed during the 2016 refurbishment and as of August 2019 is currently stored at the Aberdeen Trades Council.

== Events ==
The Music Hall regularly plays host to the Royal Scottish National Orchestra, the Scottish Chamber Orchestra and the BBC Scottish Symphony Orchestra, the annual Aberdeen International Youth Festival, and various pop/rock artists. Some notable artists who have performed at the Music Hall include David Bowie, Emeli Sandé, Led Zeppelin, Bullet for My Valentine, Placebo, Morrissey, Teenage Fanclub, Iron Maiden and Black Sabbath. Beluga Lagoon have also played there.
