= Airdrie Academy =

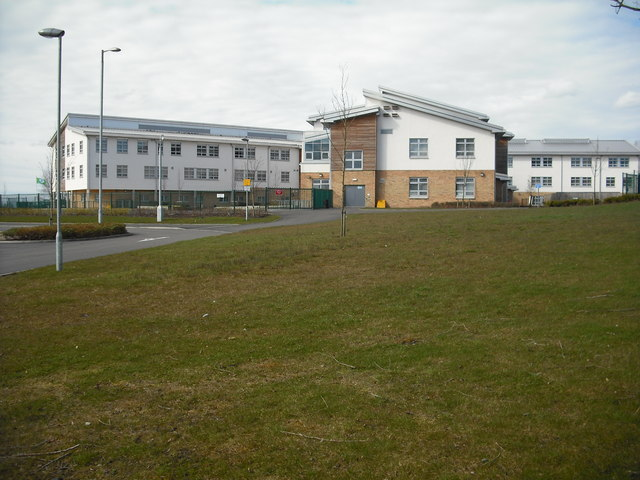
- New building in March 2009

Location
- South Commonhead Ave. Airdrie, North Lanarkshire, North Lanarkshire, ML6 6NX; Scotland
- Coordinates: 55.87531°N 3.982029°W

Information
- Type: Comprehensive
- Motto: Vigilantibus (Be Vigilant)
- Religious affiliation: None
- Established: 1849; 177 years ago
- Local authority: North Lanarkshire Council
- Head teacher: Martin Anderson
- Website: http://www.airdrie.n-lanark.sch.uk

Airdrie Academy is a secondary school in Airdrie, North Lanarkshire, Scotland.

== Admissions ==
The school has a current roll of approximately 1,100 pupils. As part of Education 2010, a new building was opened in October 2006 to replace the previous one, parts of which had been in use for almost 70 years.

The current head teacher is Martin Anderson.

== History ==
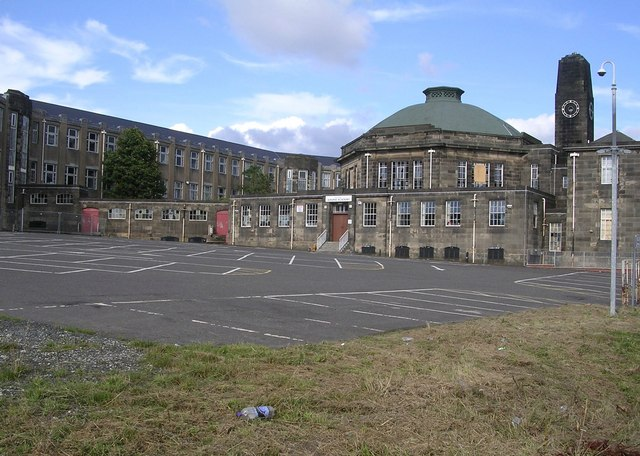
Former building

Founded in 1849, Airdrie Academy exists today in its third incarnation. The academy moved to its current site on South Commonhead Avenue in 1941. When it was built in the midst of World War II, the new building cost a little over £100,000. It was first located on Cairnhill Road in a building that housed Alexandra Primary School. The original building has since been demolished to make way for housing.

From its inception, Airdrie Academy was the senior secondary school in Airdrie: pupils who did not pass an exam on leaving primary school would go to the now defunct Airdrie High.

This system changed in the late 1960s when it became a full six-year comprehensive, nearly tripling the school roll to 1800. To cope with the increase, the South Commonhead Avenue site's existing 'A-Block' was expanded into a larger campus with specific buildings for Science and Technology, and a fourth 'House Block' with six dining halls and three floors of modern classrooms.

Though enhanced and expanded over the years, the building fell into disrepair, with students having to be taught in portable buildings during the early 2000s whilst asbestos was removed from the Science Block. After 60 years of service, the building was reaching the end of its serviceable life and North Lanarkshire Council began exploring alternatives.

In December 1988 there was a meningitis outbreak, resulting in the death of a 40-year-old teacher.

=== New building ===
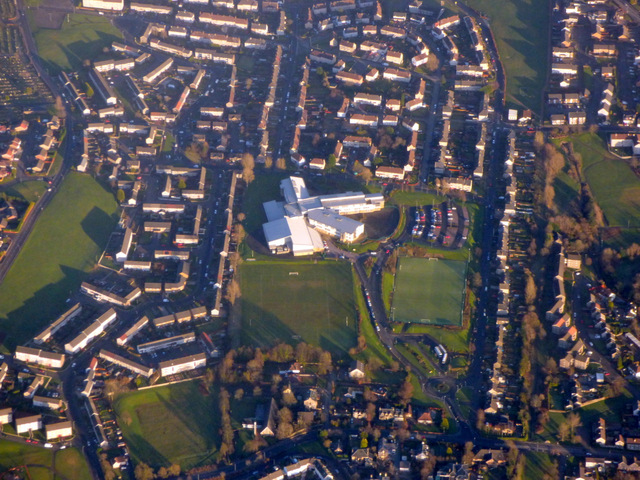
Aerial view of the modern campus, 2017

Vigorous lobbying from the school's pupils, teaching staff and the local MSP stopped the school from merging with Caldervale High in a proposed super-campus with over 2000 pupils. Instead, parents and pupils were invited to select a design for a new Airdrie Academy to be built on the playing fields of its current site. The selected design - similar to most other new schools in the county - was completed in October 2006 and is considerably smaller. The new building cost £26 million.

Over the remaining academic year, the old buildings were demolished and the land prepared for new sports fields. During this time, one wing of the old A-Block was set on fire by vandals. Demolition proceeded, and in January 2007 the 'Dome' part of the old building was pulled down.

== Notable former pupils ==
- William Whigham Fletcher FRSE, biologist
- Grant Harrold, "The Royal Butler", Britain's etiquette expert and broadcaster
- Amanda Hendrick, model
- Alan Morton, footballer
- Paul Towndrow, saxophonist

=== Grammar school ===
- James Davidson, JP FRIBA, local architect and tenth president of the Airdrie Savings Bank
- Sir George G. Macfarlane CB, engineer, scientific administrator, public servant, director from 1962 to 1967 of the Royal Radar Establishment (wartime scientist working on radar); designed the Royal Radar Establishment Automatic Computer (RREAC), the first transistor digital computer
- James Bell Pettigrew, Chandos Professor of Medicine and Anatomy from 1875 to 1908 at the University of St Andrews
- William Smith Watt FBA, classical scholar, fellow of Balliol College Oxford, Regius Professor of Humanity in the University of Aberdeen, and Fellow of the British Academy
- Sir John Wilson, 1st Baronet, Liberal Unionist Party MP from 1895 to 1906 for Falkirk Burghs
