= Amanda Hendrick =

Scottish fashion model

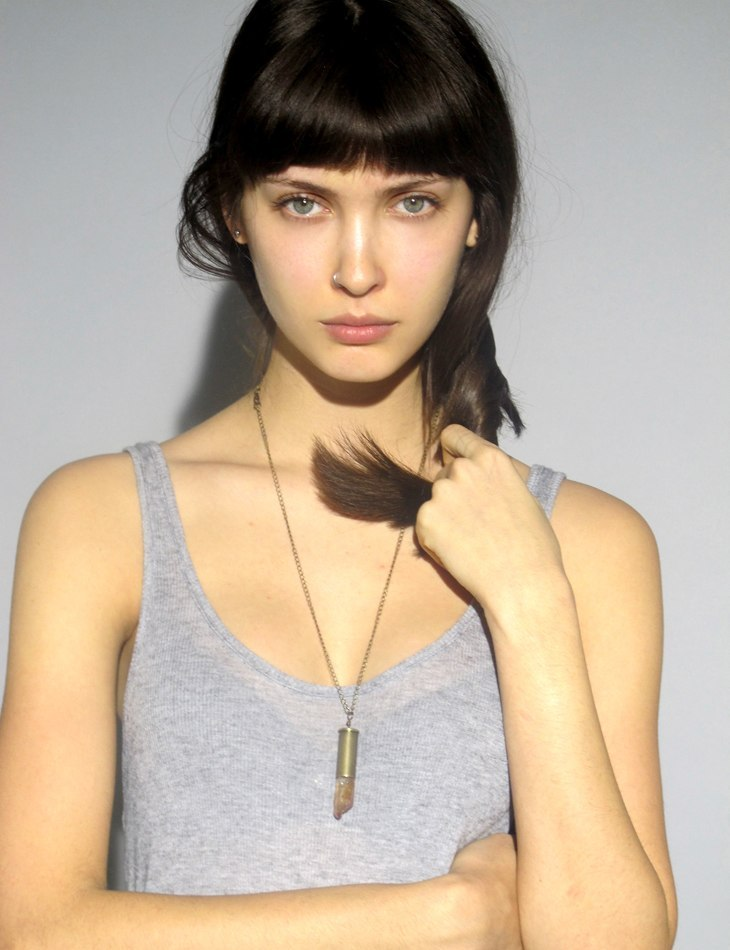
- Born: Amanda Hendrick; 10 February 1990 (age 36); Airdrie, Scotland
- Modelling information
- Height: 5 ft 10 in (1.78 m)
- Hair colour: dark brown
- Eye colour: blue/green
- Agency: Select Model Management, Colours Agency – Glasgow Source: CA

Amanda Hendrick (born 10 February 1990) is a Scottish fashion model.

== Early life ==
Hendrick was born in Airdrie, Scotland and was educated at Airdrie Academy.

== Modelling career ==
She appeared at Harvey Nichols's spring 2009 show.

In 2011 a series of advertisements by online retailer Drop Dead clothing bearing her "underweight" image were deemed "socially irresponsible" by the Advertising Standards Authority and ordered removed.

Hendrick has walked for many high fashion runway brands and was a Balenciaga exclusive at Paris Fashion Week in 2011. She also fronted a Topshop campaign and was the face of the Smashbox Cosmetics campaign which was a collaboration with artist Curtis Kulig.

She was named Scotland's Most Stylish Woman at the Scottish Style Awards in 2011. The New Yorker named her as one of their Ten Models to Watch for Spring 2013, speculating that in the coming season that she would one of the heavy hitters.

== Personal life ==
Hendrick began dating Bring Me the Horizon frontman Oliver Sykes in October 2008 with the pair eventually calling it quits in October 2012. In 2018 Hendrick was engaged to Australian musician JJ Peters with whom she has one daughter. Hendrick is currently in a relationship with Irish footballer Jeff Hendrick with whom she has one son. Hendrick is now working as a Pilates instructor.
