= Edinburgh amateur theatre =

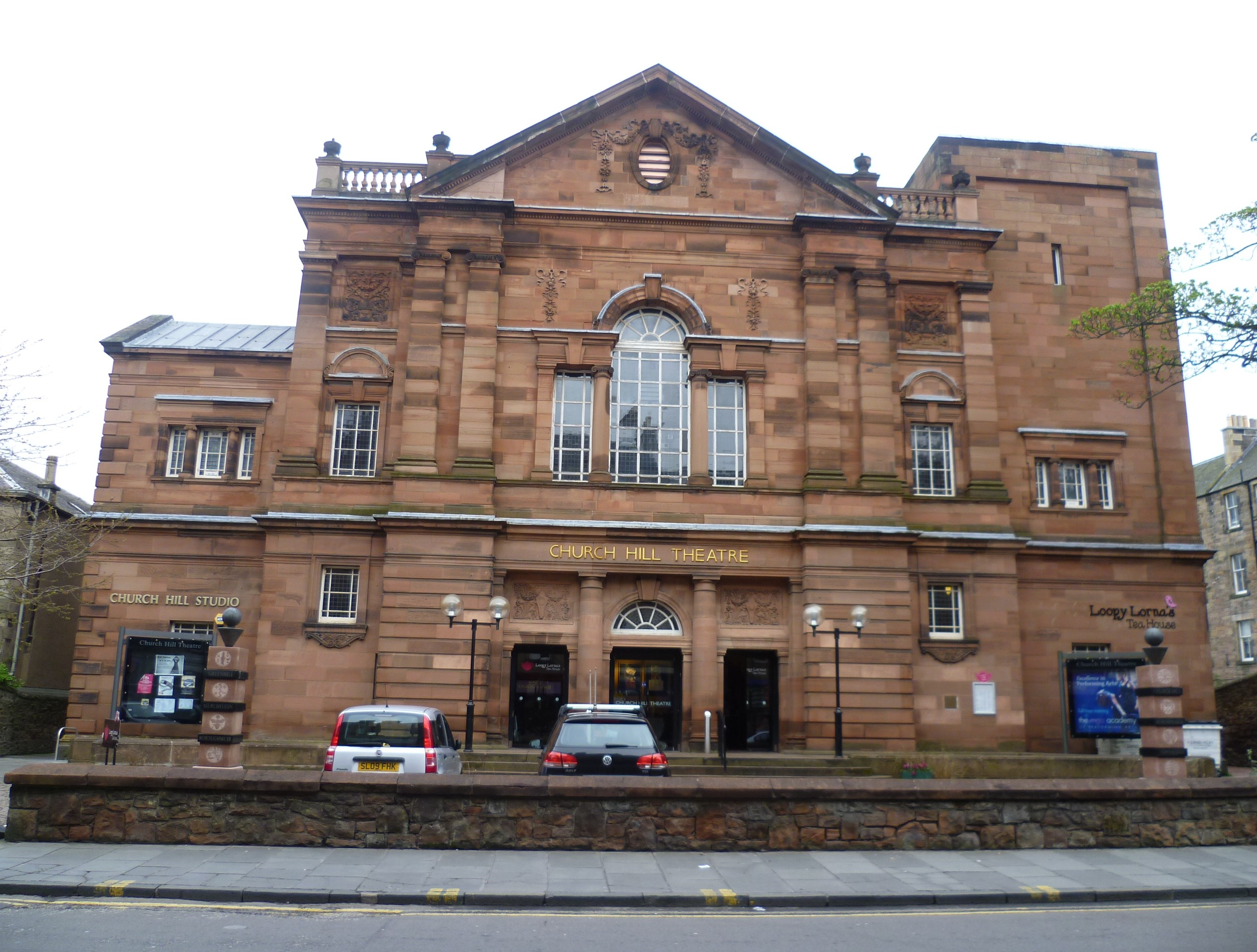
Church Hill Theatre

Edinburgh supports a large number of active amateur dramatics and musical theatre companies. Most weeks see at least one amateur production running, using one of the myriad small theatres and church halls, many of which are familiar with hosting theatrical productions thanks to being in high demand during the Edinburgh Festival Fringe. Some of the larger companies use the professional stage at the King's Theatre, whilst the City of Edinburgh Council run Church Hill Theatre is one of the most popularly used theatres for amateur companies.

== Musical theatre companies ==
- Allegro
- Balerno Theatre Company
- Bare Productions
- Bohemians
- Captivate Theatre
- Edinburgh Gang Show staged and performed by the Scouts and Guides of Edinburgh.
- Edinburgh Music Theatre (EMT)
- Edinburgh Gilbert & Sullivan Society
- Footlights
- Happy Sad Productions
- Melodramatics
- Showcase
- SMYCMS - no longer active
- Southern Light Opera
- Tempo
- LYAMC

== Opera companies ==
- Edinburgh Grand Opera
- Edinburgh University Savoy Opera Group
- Opera Camerata (formerly Sinfonia Opera).
- Edinburgh Studio Opera

== Theatre companies ==
- Arkle Theatre Company
- BigVillage Theatre Company
- Edinburgh Graduate Theatre Group (EGTG)
- Edinburgh Makars
- Edinburgh Peoples Theatre (EPT)
- Edinburgh Theatre Arts
- Edinburgh Youth Theatre
- Holy Cow Theater
- Holyrood Amateur Theatrical Society (HATS)
- Leitheatre
- Saughtonhall Drama Group
- Mercators
- Portobello Players
- Random ACT theatre company
- St Columba's Dramatic Society
- St Serf's Players
- Veracity Theatre
