= Loïc Guguen =

French opera singer (1972–2023)

Loïc Guguen (29 July 1972 – 20 January 2023) was a contemporary French dramatic baritone.

== Biography ==
Guguen studied with Rachel Yakar and in London with Laura Sarti at the "Opera Course" of the Guildhall School of Music and Drama from which he graduated in March 2006. He began the same year in London with the title role of Simon Boccanegra by Giuseppe Verdi. In 2008, Guguen starred as Valentin in the Edinburgh Grand Opera production of Gounod's Faust, and in 2011, he performed in the Théatre du Chatelet production of Sweeney Todd: The Demon Barber of Fleet Street, starring Caroline O'Connor.

Guguen died on 20 January 2023, survived by his wife and three children.

== Career ==
Opera

- Ford (Falstaff by Giuseppe Verdi) in London, under the direction of Paolo Olmi
- Don Cassandro (La Finta Semplice by Wolfgang Amadeus Mozart)
- The sculptor monk (Le Jongleur de Notre-Dame by Jules Massenet) in Metz
- Germont (La traviata by Giuseppe Verdi) and Sharpless in (Madame Butterfly by Giacomo Puccini) at the Besançon opera,
- Renato (Un ballo in maschera by Giuseppe Verdi), in Northern Ireland
- Valentin (Faust by Charles Gounod) in Edinburgh
- The Director and Presto (Les Mamelles de Tirésias by Francis Poulenc) at the Feldkirch festival in Austria,
- Marcello (La Bohème by Giacomo Puccini) at the Metz opera,

Oratorio

- St Matthew Passion by Johann Sebastian Bach (Pilate) under the direction of John Nelson
- L'Enfance du Christ by Hector Berlioz (Polydorus)
- Messa da requiem by Giuseppe Verdi with the Orchestre Colonne
