= Edinburgh Grand Opera =

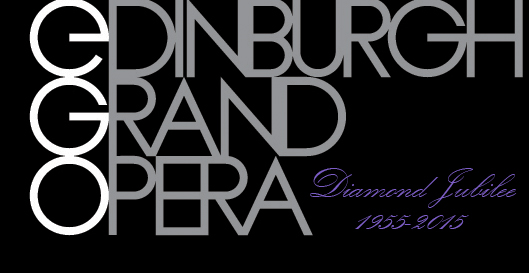
Edinburgh Grand Opera Diamond Jubilee Logo 2015

Edinburgh Grand Opera was Scotland's oldest existing grand opera company, founded in 1955 by Richard Telfer. This society was run by its non-professional chorus with advice and support from the professional Artistic and Musical Directors and Designers it engaged. It was originally known as the Edinburgh Grand Opera Group, and it has also been referred to as Edinburgh Grand Opera Company. Its soloists were a mixture of amateur, semi-professional and professional singers from Scotland and abroad, many of whom were students or graduates from the Royal Conservatoire of Scotland (previously the Royal Scottish Academy of Music and Dance). It was the first amateur company to perform at the Edinburgh Festival Theatre.

== Winding up of the society ==
On 10 April 2023, the Society gave notice to the Office of the Scottish Charity Regulator that it wished to wind up, having emerged from the COVID-19 pandemic with no sponsorship or grants to offset its costs. Membership had become so low that the EGO was unable to form a committee to continue the company's operations.

== Patrons ==
The original honorary patrons of the Edinburgh Grand Opera Group were Professor Sidney Newman, Sir Alexander Drummond Gibson and Lady Erskine-Hill.

Edinburgh Grand Opera's patrons in 2015 were international opera singers Ian Storey, Donald Maxwell and Frances McCafferty who all sang with Edinburgh Grand Opera early in their careers; conductor and chorus master Christopher Bell who was musical director for many shows.

== Musical directors ==
Musical directors and conductors have included Michael Moores, Alexander Gibson, John Grundy, Christopher Bell, Leslie Shankland, Richard Lewis, Neil Metcalfe, Susannah Wapshott, Alistair Digges.

== Artistic directors ==
Artistic and stage directors have included Cathie Boyd, Richard Telfer, Gerard Mulgrew, James Ross, Ben Twist, Andy Fraser, Adrian Osmond, Rita Henderson, John Binnie, Mark Hathaway, Michael Richardson, Christina Dunwoodie, Kally Lloyd-Jones.

== Performances ==
=== Semi and fully staged operas ===
Performances include fully staged and semi-staged operas, as well as gala concerts and other fundraising musical events in theatres and concert halls in Edinburgh and nearby towns and cities. The company usually sings in the language in which the libretto was originally written. The season runs from September each year. The list below shows performances in Edinburgh, unless otherwise stated.

- 1955 Carmen semi-staged. Usher Hall.
- 1956 Lucia di Lammermoor semi-staged. Artistic Director Richard Telfer; Administrative Director Ian Ross.
- 1957 Maritana semi-staged. Conductor Richard Telfer; Director Hubert Dunkerley; Soloists included Jean Muir, Helen Lippiatt (Maritana); Archibald Grigor (Don Caesar de Bazan); Catherine McQueenie (Lazarillo). Nabucco Artistic Director Richard Telfer; Conductor Alexander Gibson; Administrative Director Ian Ross; Soloists William Dickie (Nabucco); David Ward (Zaccaria); Jean Muir (Abigaille), Helen Lippiatt.
- 1958 Les Huguenots semi-staged. Usher Hall. 5 April 1958. Artistic Director Richard Telfer; Conductor Michael Moores; Producer Robert J Buchanan; Administrative Director Ian Ross; Soloists included David Ward (Marcel), Jean Muir (Valentine), Helen Lippiatt (Marguerite de Valois), Maureen McMahon (Urbain), Kenneth MacDonald (Sir Raoul de Nangis), Julian Smith (St Bris), William Tiplady (De Nevers).
- 1959... semi-staged.
- 1960 Semele semi-staged. Nabucco concert performance alongside Glasgow Grand Opera Society and Scottish National Orchestra. St Andrew's Hall, Glasgow 2 February. Conductor Alexander Gibson; Artistic Director Richard Telfer; Soloists Rosina R aisbeck, Ava June, David Ward, Raimund Herincx, Alfred Hallett.
- 1961 Der Freischutz semi-staged.
- 1962 L'elisir d'amore semi-staged. Pagliacci concert performance. Leith Town Hall, January.
- 1963 Faust Leith Theatre, January Soloists John Robertson (Faust) (The Bartered Bride)...
- 1964 Tales of Hoffmann Leith Theatre, February.Soloists John Robertson (Hoffmann)
- 1965 Carmen Leith Theatre Soloists John Robertson (Don Jose)
- 1966 Nabucco Leith Theatre.
- 1967...semi-staged
- 1968 The Bartered Bride
- 1969 Un ballo in maschera Musical Director Neville Garden; Producer Isobel Garden; Repetiteur Hugh McDonald; Soloists John Shiels (Renato), Iain Dunn (Gustavo), Sheila Cave and...(Amelia), Ivor Klayman (Silvano).
- 1970 Martha Musical Director Neville Garden; Producer Isobel Garden; Repetiteur Hugh McDonald; Soloists Sheila McNab (Martha), Ian McNab (Lionel), Joan Busby (Nancy), Ivor Klayman (Plunkett), Dick Jackson (Sir Tristram Mickelford).
- 1971 Macbeth Musical Director Neville Garden; Producer Isobel Garden; Soloists John Shiels (Macbeth), Ivor Klayman (Macbeth on Thursday and Banquo, sung from the pit, on Tuesday and Wednesday), Sheilah McNab (Lady Macbeth), Colin Watson (Banquo Thursday), John Monfries (MacDuff).
- 1972 Die Fledermaus Musical Director Neville Garden; Producer Isobel Garden; Soloists Tony Giovanazzi (Eisenstein), Ivor Klayman (Falke), ...Dunn (Adele), Maisie Forrest (Roselinda), Katrine Townhill (Orlofsky), Geoff Wall (Frank), Roland York (Frosch), Ian Dunn (Alfred)
- 1973 Tales of Hoffmann King's Theatre. Musical Director Neville Garden; Producer Isobel Garden; Soloists Alan Borthwick and ... (Hoffmann); John Shiels and Ivor Klayman (The 4 Villains), Katrine Townhill (Nicklausse), Tony Gioanazzi (The 4 Servants), Chris Watson and Sheilah McNab (Olympia), Maisie Forrest (Giulietta), ...(Antonia), Colin Watson (Crespel), Cathie McQueenie (voice of Antonia's mother), Geoff Wall (Lindorff).
- 1974 La bohème Kings Theatre. Frank Carroll (Marcello), Frances Carroll (Musetta)...
- 1975 Eugene Onegin King's Theatre. Musical Director James McDowall; Producer Iain Dunn; Soloists Ivor Klayman (Onegin), Sheilah McNab (Tatiana), Cathie McQueenie (Olga), Ian McNab (Lensky), Colin Watson (Gremin), Alec Jolly (Triquet), ...(Larina).
- 1976 Nabucco King's Theatre. Musical Director James McDowall; Soloists Ivor Klayman and Bill Dewar (Nabucco), Maisie Forrest and ... (Abigaille), Tom Jamieson (Ismael), Isobel Mann (Fenena).
- 1977 Carmen King's Theatre.
- 1978 Faust King's Theatre.
- 1979 The Gypsy Baron King's Theatre.
- 1980 Cavalleria rusticana / Pagliacci Musical Director Alastair Hare; Soloists Ivor Klayman. Alan Borthwick, Gelda Bell.
- 1981 Un ballo in maschera. King's Theatre. Musical Director John Grundy; Soloists Ivor Klayman, Alan Borthwick.
- 1982 Nabucco. King's Theatre. Musical Director John Grundy; Artistic Director Harry Quinn; Ivor Klayman, Tom Jamieson, Inge Mantle.
- 1983 Turandot. King's Theatre. Musical Director John Grundy; Artistic Director Harry Quinn; Soloists Tom Jamieson, Patrick Stephen Samuel, Ivor Klayman, Ian McNab.
- 1984 La Gioconda. Musical Director John Grundy; Soloists Frances McCafferty, Adele Paxton.
- 1985 Le Villi / Messa de Gloria. Edinburgh and Dunkeld Cathedral Concerts. Musical Director John Grundy; Soloists Robert Crowe, Ivor Klayman, Gelda Bell.
- 1986 Macbeth. Musical Director John Grundy; Artistic Director Harry Quinn; Soloists Ivor Klayman.
- 1987 Andrea Chénier. King's Theatre April 1887. Scottish Premier. Director John Grundy; Soloists Robert Crowe (Andrea Chénier), Gelda Bell (Madeleine), Ivor Klayman (Gerard)
- 1988 William Tell. King's Theatre. Musical Director John Grundy; Artistic Director Harry Quinn; Soloists Ivor Klayman and Peter Cannell (William Tell), Robert Crowe, Richard Bourjo and Dick Jackson (Gessler), Susan Hamilton and Heather Coates (Jemmy), Frances McCafferty (Mrs Tell), Andy Fraser, Brian Allingham, Malcolm Crosby.
- 1989 Cavalleria rusticana / Pagliacci. King's Theatre. Sung in English. Musical Director Michael Moores; Artistic Director Harry Quinn; Soloists Ivor Klayman (Tonio), Gelda Bell (Nedda), Andrew Fraser (Turiddu), Suzanne Bell, Peter Cannell (Sylvio), Tom Jamieson (Canio), Frances Klayman.
- 1990 Hérodiade. King's Theatre. 21 – 24 March. Sung in English. Director John Robertson; Musical Director Christopher Bell; Soloists Ian McNab and Tom Jamieson (John the Baptist) Ivor Klayman (Herod).
- 1991 Nabucco. King's Theatre. 20 – 23 March. Sung in English. Musical Director Christopher Bell. Producer John Robertson; Set Designer Dan Docwra; Costume Designer Roy Bell; Lighting Designer Jeremy Webber; Soloists Ivor Klayman and Peter Cannell (Nabucco), Gelda Bell and Joanne Armstrong (Abigail), Richard Bourjo and Colin Heggie (Zachariah), Jill Blackmore and Ann Heavens (Fenena), Mike Towers and Ian Priestley (Ismael), Frances Klayman (Anna), George McHollan (Abdullah), John McLeod (High Priest).
- 1992 Turandot. King's Theatre. 26 – 29 February. Musical Director Christopher Bell; Producer Gerard Mulgrew; Set Designer Dan Dowcra; Costume Designer Roy Bell; Lighting Designer Jeremy Webber; Rehearsal Accompanist Morley Whitehead; Soloists Lesley Cook and Elizabeth Fletcher (Liù), Gareth Lloyd and Robert Crowe (Calaf), Donald Sutherland (Prince of Persia) Fiona Galloway and Margot Archibald (Turandot), John McLeod and Brian Allingham (Timur), Ivor Klayman (Ping), Ian Priestley (Pang), Mike Towers (Pong), David Campbell (Mandarin), George McHollan (Emperor).
- 1993 The Pilgrim's Progress. King's Theatre. 28 April -1 May 1993 Musical Director Christopher Bell; Producers Gerard Mulgrew and James Bryce; Soloists Ivor Klayman.
- 1994 Aida. King's Theatre. 23 – 26 March Musical Director Christopher Bell; Producer Ben Twist; Choreographer Jane Howie (working with non-EGO dance group); Soloists Janet Myatt née de Vigne and Fiona Galloway (Aida), David Hillman and Mike Towers (Radames), Gillian Haycock and Helen Brown (Amneris), Ivor Klayman (Amonasro), Richard Bourjo (The King), John McLeod (Ramphis), Frances Klayman (Priestess), George McHollan (Messenger).
- 1995 Carmen. King's Theatre. Musical Director Christopher Bell; Artistic Director Gerard Mulgrew; Assistant Director Andrew Fraser; Soloists Ian Storey (Don Jose), Susan Miller (Carmen), Elizabeth Fletcher (Micaela), Ivor Klayman (Dancairo), Richard Burjo (Zuniga).
- 1996 Peter Grimes. Edinburgh Festival Theatre. 27–30 March 1996. Musical Director John Grundy; Artistic Director James Ross; Assistant Director Andrew Fraser; Designer Nick Millar; Lighting Designer Alan Campbell; Soloists Ian Storey and Neil Jenkins (Peter Grimes), Ivor Klayman (Balstrode), Elizabeth Fletcher (Ellen Orford), Jo Hugh-Jones (Ned Keene), Ian McNab (Rector), Katrine Townhill.
- 1997 Faust. Edinburgh Festival Theatre. 9–12 April 1997. Musical Director John Grundy; Artistic Director Cathie Boyd; Soloists Ian Storey (Faust), Ivor Klayman (Mephistopheles).
- 1998 Macbeth. Edinburgh Festival Theatre. 8–11 April. Musical Director John Grundy; Artistic Directors Rita Henderson and Andy Fraser; Set and Costume Designer Craig James-Hewitt; Lighting Designer Alan Campbell; Chorus Maste Nicholas Jones; Rehearsal Accompanist Morley Whitehead; Stage Manager Alf Buchan; Assistant Stage Manager Maggie Woodl Properties Denise Boulton; Soloists Jonathan Hawkins and Ivor Klayman (Macbeth); Dorothy King and Janet De Vigne (Lady Macbeth), Brian Allingham and Peter Cannell (Banquo), Alexander Anderson-Hall (Macduff), Paul Egerton and Eddie McKenna (Malcolm), Judith Plint (Lady in Waiting), Janet Ironside (Minister without Portfolio), Gordon McManus and Scott Hoatson (Fleance), Susie Hazeldine (Third Witch), Christopher (Apparition Child Duncan).
- 1999 Cavalleria rusticana / Pagliacci. Edinburgh Festival Theatre. 17–20 March 1999. Musical Director Christopher Bell. Artistic Director Rita Henderson; Soloists Judith Plint (Santuzza), Fraser Simpson (Turiddo), Mary Oliver (Lola), Jill Blackmore (Mama), Eddie McKenna (Harlequin), Robert Crowe (Cavio), Katy Morrell (Nedda), David Danson (Tonio), Peter Cannell (Silvio).
- 2000 Prince Igor. Edinburgh Festival Theatre. 29 March - 1 April 2000 Musical Director Andrew Lees; Artistic Director Rita Henderson; Assistant Director Graham Crammond; Rehearsal Accompanist Morley Whitehead; Set Designer Craig James-Hewitt; Costume Designer Andrew Burt; Lighting Designer Alan Campbell; Stage Manager Alf Buchan; Choreographer Jane Jewell; Soloists Ivor Klayman (Igor), Colin Heggie (Khan Kontchak), Fiona Galloway and Mary Oliver (Yaroslavna), Mark Jacques (Prince Galitsky), Alexander Anderson-Hall (Prince Vladimir), Katrine Townhill (Kontchakovna), John McLeod (Erochka), Mike Towers ( Skula), Nina Modi (Polovtsian maiden), Ian McNab (Ovlour), Frances Klayman (The Nanny).
- 2001 The Pearl Fishers. Edinburgh Festival Theatre. 21 – 24 March 2001. Sung in English. Musical Director Leslie Shankland; Artistic Director Rita Henderson; Assistant Director Graham Crammond; Set John Reid; Soloists Ivor Klayman (Zurga), Roberto Garcia Lopez (Nadir), Simone Sahyouni (Leila), John McLeod (Nourabad) Mary Oliver...
- 2002 Queen of Spades. Edinburgh Festival Theatre. 20 – 23 March 2002 Musical Director Leslie Shankland; Artistic Director Adrian Osmond; Designer Jon Bausor; Soloists Michael Dewis (Count yeletsky), Gordon Wilson (Herman), Howard Quilla Croft (Tomsky), Carol Smith (Liza), Rebecca Sharp (The Countess), Mike Towers.
- 2003 Turandot. Edinburgh Festival Theatre. 12 – 15 March 2003. Sung in English. Musical Director Richard Lewis; Artistic Director John Binnie; Set and Costume Designer Jessica Worrall; Lighting Designer Tariq Hussain; Soloists Janet de Vigne and Fiona Galloway (Turandot), John Carlo Bellotti and Paul Featherstone (Calaf), Richard Bourjo (Timor), Paul Featherstone and John Carlo Bellotti (Calaf), Ivor Klayman (Ping), Steven Griffin (Pang), Andrew Fraser (Pong), Ian McNab (Emperor), Mary Oliver (Liù), John McLeod (Mandarin), Gordon Darling (Prince of Persia), Susan McNaught (Executioner).
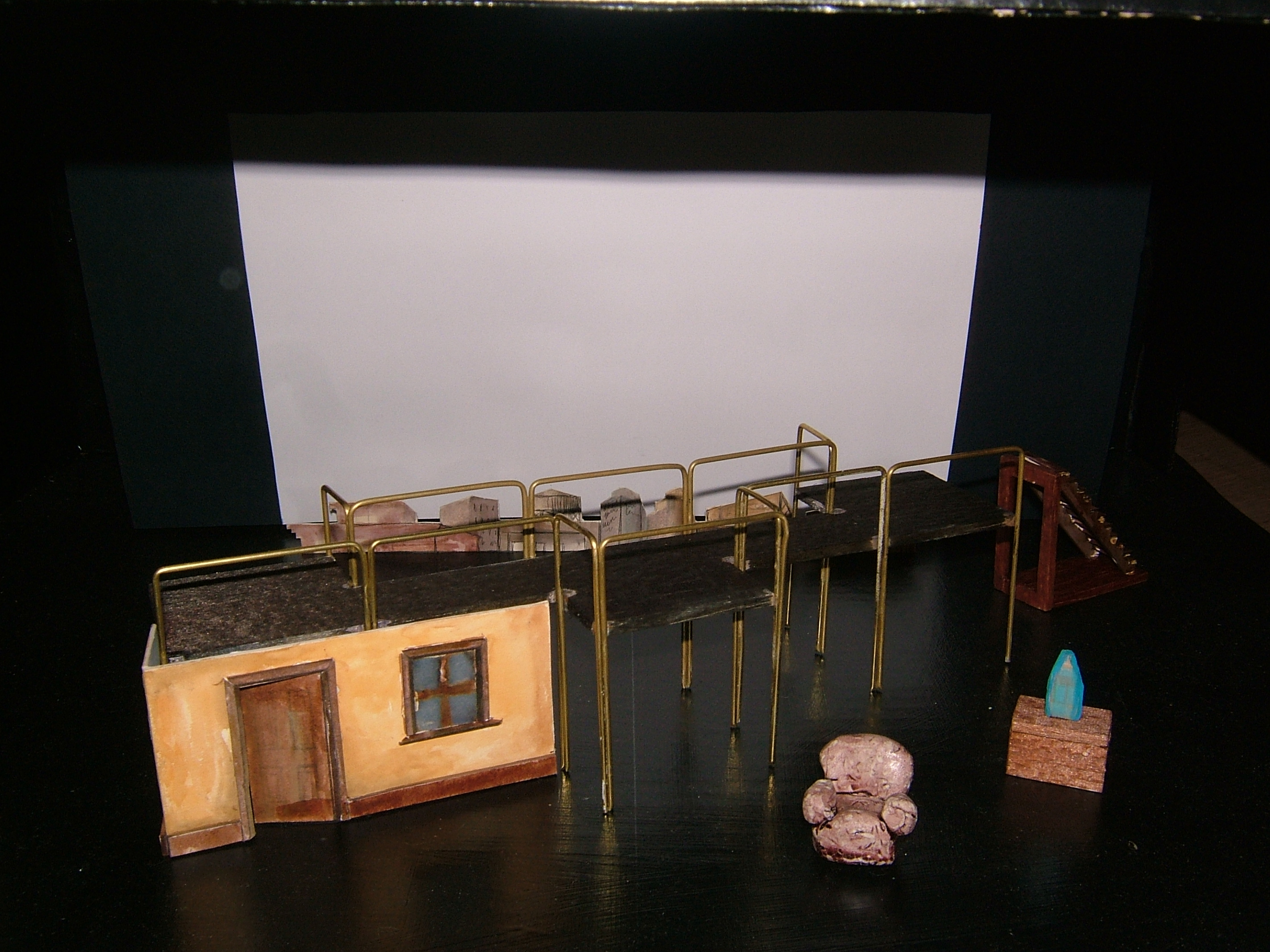
  Model of Annina's Apartment for the Saint of Bleecker Street at the Festival Theatre, Edinburgh.
- 2003-2004 Carmen. Edinburgh Festival Theatre. 10 – 13 March 2004. Sung in French; Musical Director Richard Lewis; Artistic Director John Binnie; Costume Designer Jessica Worral; Lighting Designer Kevin Robertson; Rehearsal Accompanist Morley Whitehead; Soloists Carmel Carrol (Carmen), John Marshall (Don José), Ivor Klayman (Le Dancaire), Carolyn Filak Royan (Mercedes), Daniela Schuster (Frasquita), Richard Morris (Escamillo), Catriona Holt (Micaela).
- 2004-2005 Aida. Edinburgh Festival Theatre. 9 –12 March 2005. Sung in Italian, Musical Director Richard Lewis; Artistic Director Mark Hathaway; Assistant Musical Director Rupert Forbes; Set Designer Jim Cursitor; Costume Designer Trish Kenny; Lighting Designer Mick Andrew; Rehearsal Accompanist Morley Whitehead; Soloists Janet de Vigne and Fiona Galloway (Aida), John Marshall and Fraser Simpson (Radames), Alison Barton and Sharon Jacobsen (Amneris), Iain Hunter (Ramphis), Ivor Klayman (Amonasro), John McLeod (King), Mark McLeod (Messenger), Susan McNaught (High Priestess).
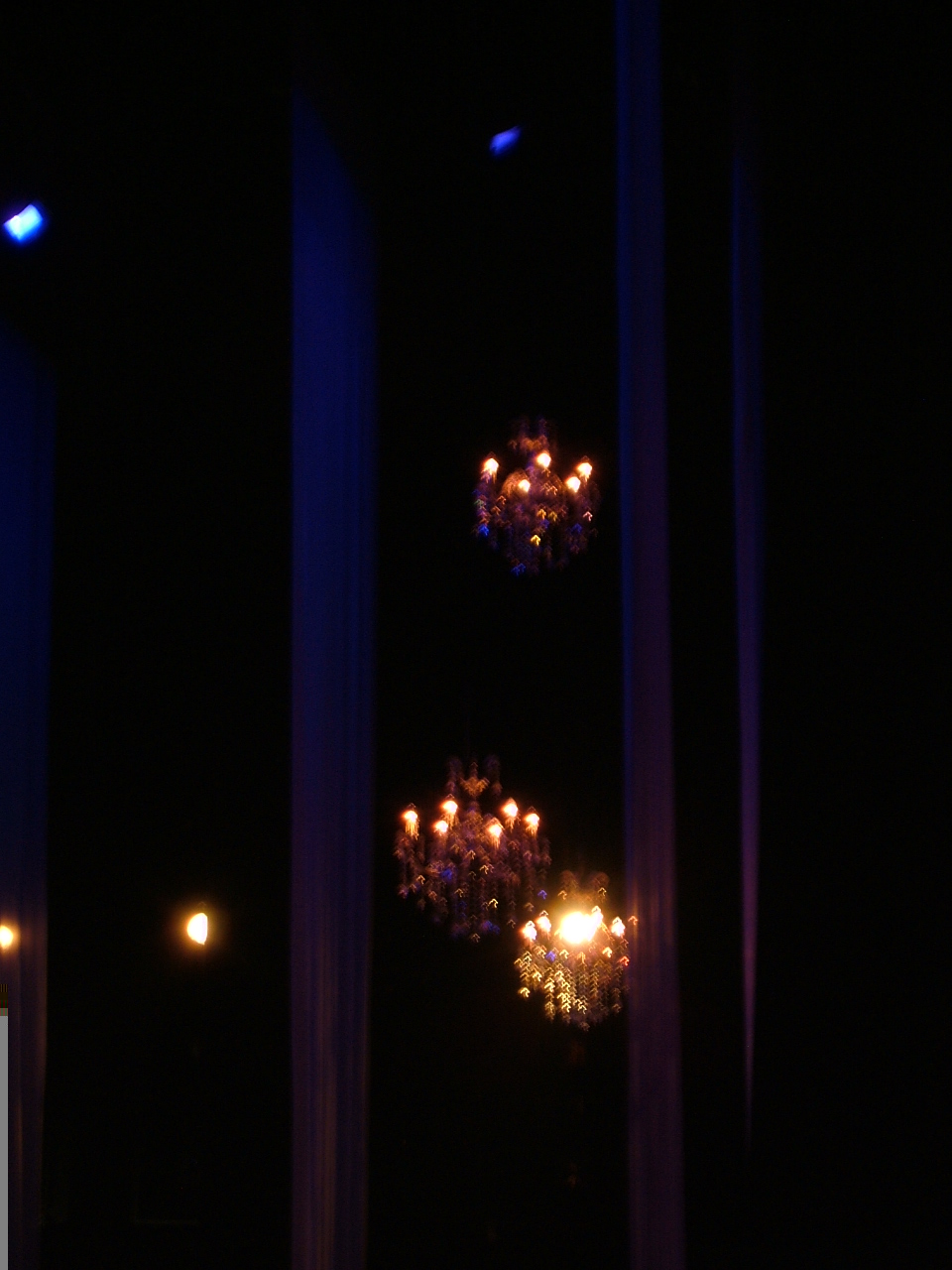
  Nabucco Set 2007 at the Festival Theatre, Edinburgh
- 2005-2006 The Saint of Bleecker Street. Edinburgh Festival Theatre. 15 –18 March 2006. Scottish Premier. Sung in the original English, Italian and Latin. Musical Director Richard Lewis; Artistic Director Rita Henderson; Set Designer Jim Cursiter; Costume Designer Trish Kenny; Lighting J Gordon Hughes; Chorus Master Rupert Forbes; Répétiteur Morley Whitehead; Soloists Janet de Vigne and Mary Oliver (Annina); Alexander Anderson-Hall and Paul Featherstone (Michele), Helen Brown and Alison Barton (Desideria), Ivor Klayman (Don Marco) Damaris Chalmers (Assunta), Emma Morwood and Jessica Smith (Carmela), Alison Beck (Maria Corona), Christopher Young (Salvatore), Andrew Fraser (Young Man/Wedding Guest), Ginny Wilson (Young Woman), Kenny McLeod (Barman), Philip Moynihan (Maria Corona's son).
- 2006-2007 Nabucco. Edinburgh Festival Theatre. 21 – 24 March 2007. Sung in Italian; Musical Director Richard Lewis; Artistic Director Rita Henderson; Set and Costume Designer Becky Minto; Lighting Mike Brown; Associate Director Graham Crammond; Lighting Designer Mike Brown; Chorus Master Rupert Forbes; Rehearsal Accompanist Morley Whitehead; Soloists Ivor Klayman and Phil Gault (Nabucco), Fraser Simpson and Alexander Anderson-Hall (Ismaele), John Milne and Edwin Hawkes (Zaccaria), Christina Dunwoodie and Janet de Vigne (Abigaille), Alison Barton (Fenena), Susan McNaught (Anna), Richard Mein (High Priest), Christopher Young (Abdallo).
- 2007-2008 Faust. Edinburgh Festival Theatre. 12 –15 March 2008. Sung in French. Musical Director Richard Lewis; Artistic Director Rita Henderson; Assistant Director Graham Crammond; Set and Costume Designer Edward Lipscomb; Lighting Designer Mike Brown; Chorus Master Rupert Forbes; Répétiteurs Derek Williams and Morley Whitehead; Off-stage Conductor Derek Williams; Soloists Rafael Alvarez and Paul Featherstone (Faust), Christina Dunwoodie and Helen Lear (Marguerite), Timothy Dawkins and Ivor Klayman (Mephistopheles), Taylor Wilson (Siebel), Loïc Guguen (Valentin), Richard Mein (Wagner), Judith Gardner Jones (Martha), Dominique Haig and Jonny Moynihan (Children).
- 2009-2010 Macbeth. Royal Lyceum. 26 – 29 May 2010. Sung in Italian. Musical Director Neil Metcalfe; Artistic Director Michael Richardson. Designer Rebecca Hamilton; Lighting Designer Roy Fairhead; Répétiteur Morley Whitehead; Soloists Susan McNaught and Christina Dunwoodie (Lady Macbeth), Phil Gault and Ivor Klayman (Macbeth), Hugh Hillyard Parker and Peter Cannell (Banquo), Joe Earley (Malcolm), Paul Featherstone and Mike Towers (Macduff), Jennifer Craig (Lady in Waiting), Russell Malcolm (Doctor), Kenneth McLeod (Assassin), Chrissie Huxford (Fleance), Alex Anderson, Ross Clarke and Lewis Gilchrist (Apparitions), Martin Gray, John Greig and Sandy Low (Messengers).
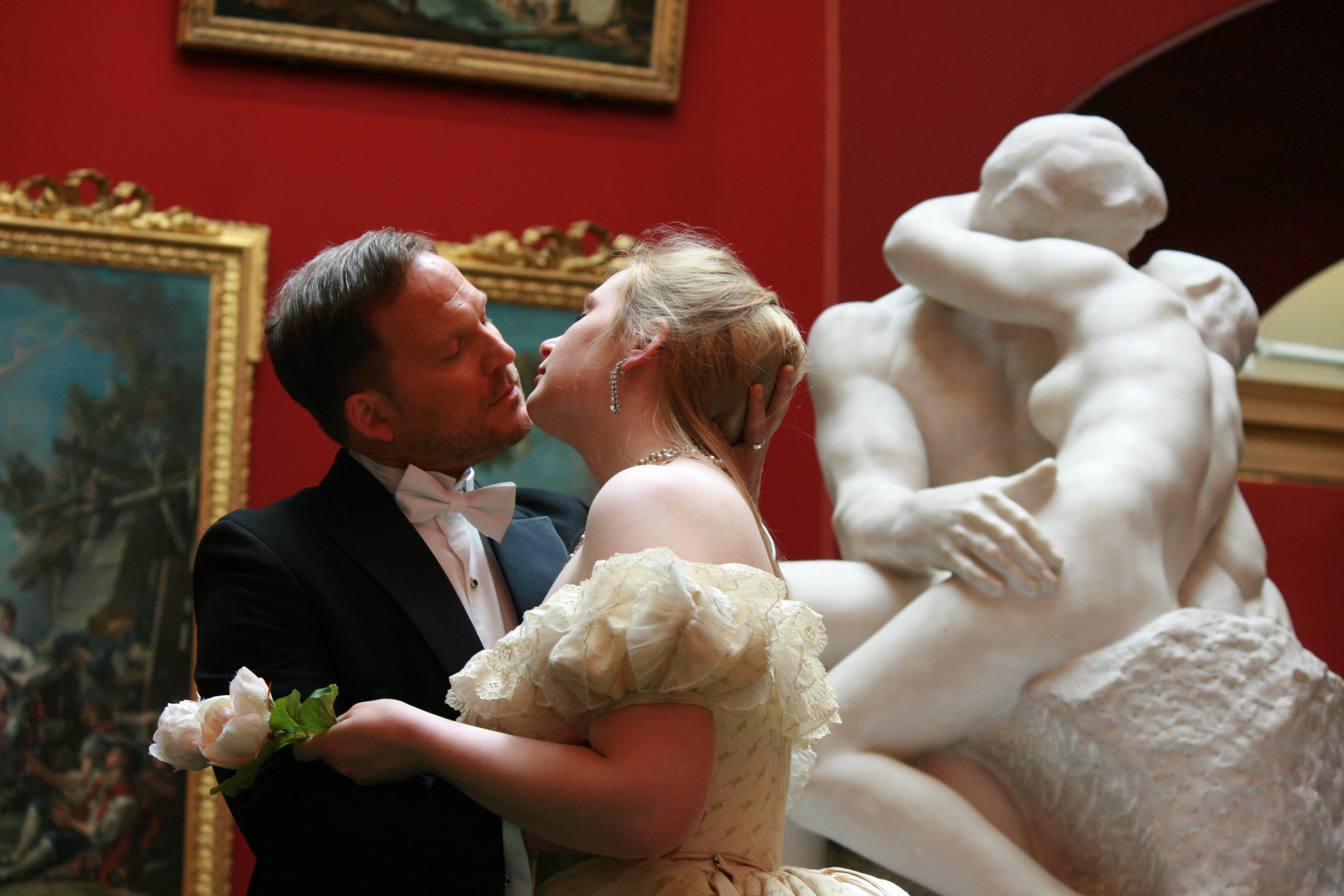
  Press Call for La Traviata 2013 at the Scottish National Gallery with Ralph Strehle and Rachael Brimley.
- 2010-2011 Imprisoned in Edinburgh (La Prigione di Edimburgo) semi-staged. Queen's Hall. 15 May 2011. British Premier. Imprisoned in Edinburgh (La Prigione di Edimburgo) semi-staged St Andrew's and St George's West Church, George Street 21 August 2011 as part of the Edinburgh Festival Fringe. Musical Director Neil Metcalfe; Artistic Director Christina Dunwoodie; Designer Annette Gillies; Répétiteur Morley Whitehead; Soloists Ivor Klayman (Tom), Christina Dunwoodie (Giovanna), Susan McNaught (Ida), Peter Cannell (Duke of Argyle), David Hamilton (Giorgio), Jennifer Craig (Fanny), Russell Malcolm (Patrizio); Narrator Donald Maxwell.
- 2011-2012 Carmen. Royal Lyceum. 23 – 26 May 2012. Musical Director Neil Metcalfe; Artistic Director Christina Dunwoodie; Assistant Director Iain Orr; Designer Annette Gillies; Lighting George Cort; Répétiteurs Morley Whitehead and Oliver Rundell; Marching Drill Company Sergeant Major Brian Ward; Soloists Laura Margaret Smith and Fiona MacDonald (Carmen), Jakob Holtze and Adam Magee (Don Jose), Mikhail Pavlov and Anders Oestberg (Escamillo), Jennier Baird and Natasha Day (Micaela), Angela Estrada and Susan McNaught (Frasquita), Catriona Morison and Ditte Errboe (Mercedes), Raoni De Barros and Cailean Swainson (Remondado), Blake Parham and Ivor Klayman (Dancairo), Ben Ellis (Morales), Richard Mein (Zuniga), Narrator Mercedes Jennifer Hainey; Dancers Scott Robertson and Sarah Aitken. Young people from the National Youth Choir of Scotland.
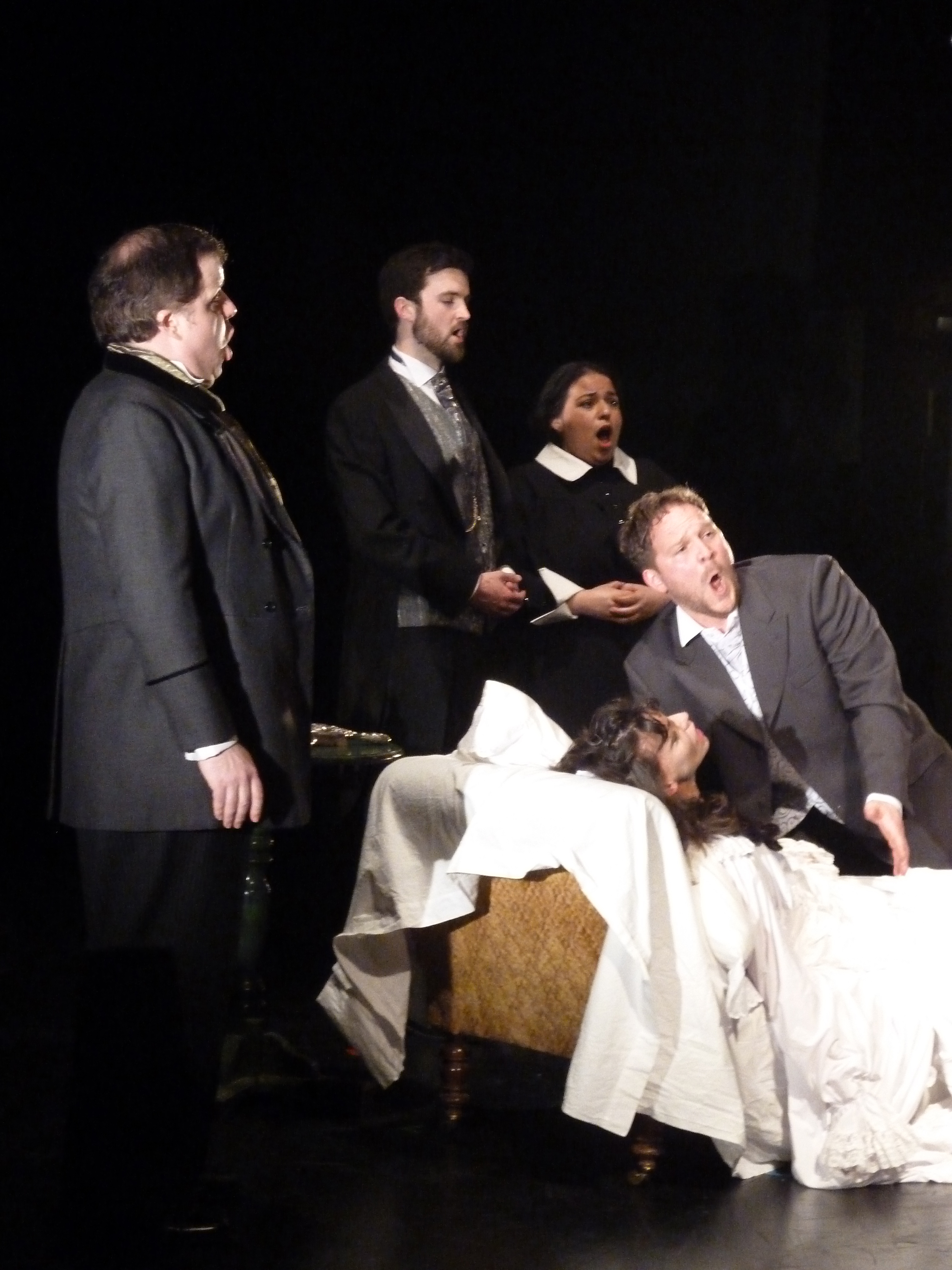
  Edinburgh Grand Opera La Traviata cast 2013 at the King's Theatre, Edinburgh.
- 2012-2013 Don Giovanni semi-staged concert. Queen's Hall. 11 February 2013. Musical Director Richard Lewis; Artistic Director Christina Dunwoodie; Designer Annette Gillies; Soloists Anders Östberg (Giovanni), Rhys Jenkins (Leporello), Christina Dunwoodie (Anna), Susan McNaught (Elvira), Ralph Strehle (Ottavio), Timothy Dawkins (Commendatore), Jennifer Craig (Zerlina), Benjamin Ellis (Masetto), Répétiteur Jon Luke Kirton. La traviata King's Theatre. 8 –11 May 2013. Artistic Director Christina Dunwoodie; Assistant Director Johnathan Elmer; Designer Annette Gillies; Lighting Designer George Cort; Conductor Richard Lewis; Répétiteur Jon Luke Kirton; Soloists Rachael Brimley and (Violetta), Susan McNaught (Violetta), Ralph Strehle (Alfredo), Ivor Klayman and Rhys Jenkins (Germont), Taylor Wilson and Debora Ruiz Kordova (Flora), Sarah Buckley and Angela Estrada (Annina), Cailean Swainson (Gaston), David O'Hanlon (Baron), Richard Mein and Ian Paterson (Marquis), Benjamin Ellis (Doctor), William Gentleman and Jamie McBride (Gardener), Tom Kelman (Guest), Daniel Fisher (Messenger), Scott Robertson (Dancer), Janine Melanie Wyse (Dancer).
- 2014-2015 L'elisir d'amore. Church Hill Theatre. 6–9 May 2015. Conductor Susannah Wapshott; Director Kally Lloyd-Jones; Designer Janis Hart; Repetiteur Matthildur Gisladottir; Poster Helen F Wilson; Soloists Ivor Klayman (Dulcamara), Jessica Leary and Marie Claire Breen (Adina), Luperci de Souza (Nemorino); Angela Estrada (Giannetta), Mikhail Pavlov (Belcore).
- 2015-2016 La Bohème. Church Hill Theatre. 16, 18, 19 March 2016. Conductor Susannah Wapshott; Director Kally Lloyd-Jones; Designer Janis Hart; Lighting Designer Laura Hawkins; Soloists Deborah Rudden (Mimì), Luke Sinclair (Rodolfo), Douglas Nairne (Marcello), Timothy Edmundson (Schaunard), Donald Thomson (Colline); Donald Maxwell (Benoit/Alcindoro).

=== Concerts ===
- 2003-2004 La Clemenza di Tito. Queen's Hall. 8 May 2004. Musical Director Richard Lewis; Rehearsal Accompanist Morley Whitehead; Soloists John Marshall (Tito), Janet de Vigne (Vitellia), Lois Johnston (Servilia), Carmel Carrol (Sesto), Carolyn Filak Royan (Annio/Annius), Ivor Klayman (Publio/Publius) with the Edinburgh Chamber Orchestra.
- 2005-2006 Dial M for Mozart (Excerpts from Die Zauberflote, Symphony No 40 in G minor and Requiem Mass). St Andrew's and St George's West Church as part of the Edinburgh Festival Fringe. 11 and 22 August 2006. Conductor Richard Lewis with Edinburgh Grand Opera Orchestra. Soloists Janet de Vigne, Damaris Chalmers, John Marshal, Ivor Klayman, Emma Morwood (Pamina), John McLeod (Sarastro).
- 2006-2007 Take Note! (abridged Cosi fan Tutte, Nelson Mass). St Andrew's and St George's West 10,16 and 23 August 2007. Conductors Richard Lewis (10 and 16), Rupert Forbes (23); Soloists Janet de Vigne (Fiordiligi), Sharon Jacobsen (Dorabella), Gillian Robertson (Despina), Fraser Simpson (Ferrando), Iain Hunter (Guglielmo), Douglas Nairne (Don Alfonso), Ginny Wilson,..., Fraser Simpson, John McLeod.
- 2007-2008 A Night at the Operas. St Andrew's and St George's West as part of the Edinburgh Festival Fringe. 15 and 16 August 2008.(Norina's Aria, Musetta's Aria, Jewel Song, Micaela's Aria, Habanera and chorus Prayer from Moise, Habanera, Anvil Chorus, Witches' Chorus and Chorus of the Scottish Refugees from Macbeth, Pagliacci Bell Chorus, March of the Toreadors, Villagers' Chorus from William Tell, Chorus of the Hebrew Slaves, Lucia de Lammermoor Chorus of the Wedding Guests). Conductor Rupert Forbes; Pianist Morely Whitehead; Soloists Helen Lear, Gillian Robertson.
- 2008-2009 An Evening With Ian Storey. Reid Concert Hall. 25 October 2008. (Prasti nebesnaye sazdanye, O König, E lucevan le stelle, Nium mi tema, Nessun Dorma and chorus Eugene Onegin Waltz Scene and Chorus of Peasant Girls, Lohengrin Bridal Chorus. Chorus Master Rupert Forbes; Pianist Morley Whitehead. Gala Opera Night. Queen's Hall. 22 March 2009. (Serbate oh Dei custodi, Via reste servita, Sull'aria...che soave zeffiretto, Bella vita militar, Secondate, Trio No 3 Mozart, Chorus of the Hebrew Slaves, Trio and Scene IV Finale from Nabucco Scene IV Finale from Nabucco, Voce di Donna, Macbeth Witches' and Refugees Choruses, Habanera, Quant au douanier, Je dis que rien, Toreador, Brindisi Sextet rom Lucia di Lammermoor, Papageno-Papagena, Die Strahlen de Sonne). Musical Director Richard Lewis; Chorus Master Rupert Forbes; Accompanist Morley Whitehead; Movement Director Graham Crammond; Compere Donald Maxwell; Soloists Frances McCafferty, Donald Maxwell, Christina Dunwoodie, Alex Anderson-Hall, Alison Beck, Paul Featherstone, Judith Gardner Jones, Ivor Klayman, Susan McNaught, Emma Morwood, Donald Maxwell. Fauré Requiem and Bizet Te Deum. St Andrew's and St George's West. 21 and 22 August 2009 as part of the Edinburgh Festival Fringe (with Cantique de Jean Racine, En Prière, Salve Regina, Te Deum Laudamus). Conductor Rupert Forbes; Accompanist Morley Whitehead; Soloists Gillian Robertson, Tom Morss, Andrew McTaggart.
- 2009-2010 Die Fledermaus. Canongate Kirk. 11 December 2009. Sung in English. Musical Director Neil Metcalfe; Accompanist Morley Whitehead; Soloists Joe Earley (Eisenstein), Judith Gardner Jones (Rosalinda), Susan Hamilton (Adele), Hugh Hillyard-Parker (Falke) John Leckie-Stuart (Alfredo), Roderick Bryce (Frank), Carole Clarke (Prince Orlofsky), Angela Hicks (Ida). Narrator Alex Anderson. Die Fledermaus. Sung in English.St Andrew's and St George's West. 20 and 21 August 2010 as part of the Edinburgh Festival Fringe. Musical Director Neil Metcalfe; Repetiteur Claire Haslin; Soloists Joe Earley (Eisenstein), Darla Glover (Rosalinda), Jennifer Craig (Adele), Hamish MacKay (Falke) Tom Morss (Alfredo), Peter Cannell (Frank), Carole Clarke (Prince Orlofsky), Isla Robertson (Ida); Narrator Michael Mills.
- 2011-2012 Operatic Gala. St Andrew's and St George's West. 24 March 2012. Musical Director Neil Metcalfe; Artistic Director Christina Dunwoodie; Soloists Ditte Erboe, Mikhail Pavlov, Peter Cannell, Natasha Day, Laura Margaret Smith, Jakob Holtze, Susan McNaught, Angela Estrada, Richard Mein, Jennifer Craig, Cailean Swainson, Caroline James. Young people from the National Youth Choir of Scotland.
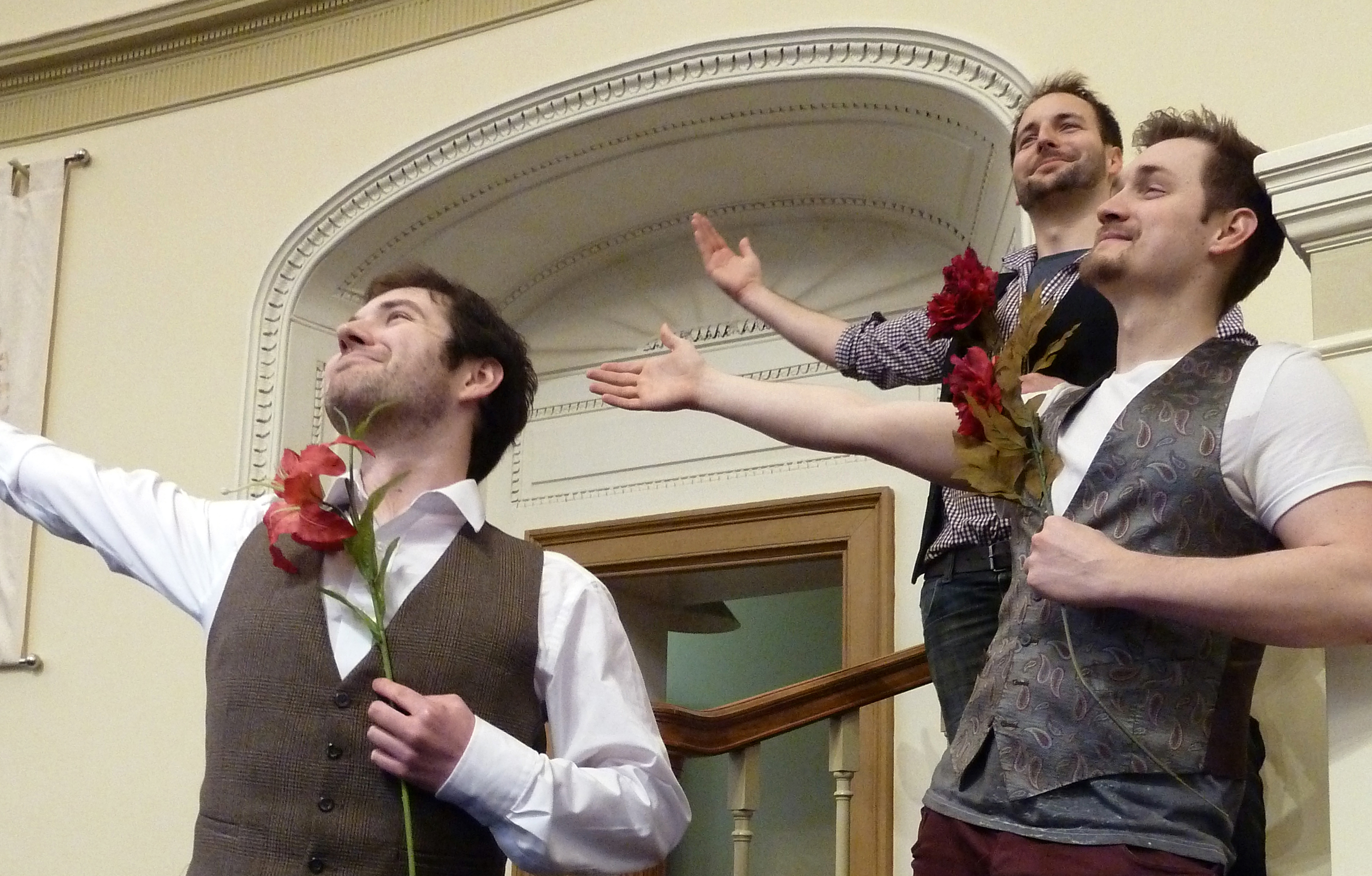
  American Night at the Opera rehearsal at St Andrew's and St George's West, Edinburgh. L-R: James Corrigan, Jonathan Cooke, David Horton.
- 2012-2013 Christmas Gala Concert. St Cuthbert's Church, Lothian Road. 9 December 2012. (Polovtsian Dances, Priests' Chorus and Trio Magic Flute, Catalogue Aria, Barcarolle, Chorus of the Hebrew Slaves, Dido's Lament, I Dreamt I Dwelt in Marble Halls, Bridal Chorus, Wedding Chorus, Pour, o Pour the Pirate Sherry, I am a Pirate King, Glitter and Be Gay, Evening Prayer, Champagne Toast and Dui Du from Die Fledermaus, If I Were A Rich Man, I Could Have Danced All Night, Still Still Still, We Wish You A Merry Christmas). Conductor Neil Metcalfe; Soloists Christina Dunwoodie, Susan McNaught, Ivor Klayman, Jennifer Craig. Verdi Bi-centenary Gala Concert. St Cuthbert's Church. 10 March 2013. (Brindisi Rachael Brimley, Barry McAleer and Chorus; Saper VoresteAngela Estrada; Si, La Stanchezza...Si Nostri MontiTaylor Wilson, Barry McAleer; Merce Diletti Amiche Susan McNaught; Che V’Agita Cosi Christina Dunwoodie, Debora Ruiz-Kordova, Barry McAleer; Caro Nome Jennifer Craig; O Don Fatale Debora Ruiz-Kordovo; Lunge Da Sie...Deh Miei Bollenti Spiriti Barry McAleer; Bella Figlia Del’Amore Jennifer Craig, Taylor Wilson, Ralph Strehle, Anders Ostberg; Gypsy and Matador Scenes, Taylor Wilson Cailean Swainson, Ben Ellis, Ian Paterson; Ernani Involami Rachael Brimley; Miserere Susan McNaught, Barry McAleer; O Figli Miei...Ah, La Paterna Mano Ralph Strehle; Pace Mio Dio Christina Dunwoodie; Per Me Giunto...O Carlo Ascolto Anders Ostberg; Va Pensiero Tutti). Summer Opera Gala. Brunton Theatre, Musselburgh as part of the Edinburgh Festival Fringe. 16 August 2013. Musical Director Richard Lewis; Producer Christina Dunwoodie; Soloists Wedding Chorus from Lucia... Graham Webster, Catalogue Aria Ivor Klayman, Soave Si il Vento Jennifer Craig, Sarah Gross, Ivor Klayman, Barcarolle Christina Dunwoodie, Susan McNaught, Fear No Danger Sarah Gross, Kirsten Wallace, Dido's Lament Sarah Gross, Marie Therese Jennifer Craig, Christina Dunwoodie, Susan McNaught, McDuff's Aria William Turner, Dich Theure Halle Susan McNaught, Ah Non Credea Jennifer Craig, Brindisi Susan McNaught, William Turner, Gia Nella Note Densa Christina Dunwoodie, William Turner, Bridal Chorus Ensemble, Pirate King Ivor Klayman, Glitter and be Gay Jennifer Craig, Summertime Christina Dunwoodie, Dein ist Mein Ganzes Herz William Turner, Evening PrayerJennifer Craig, Susan McNaught, Chorus of the Hebrew Slaves Ensemble.
- 2013-2014 Opera Extravaganza. Queen's Hall. 3 November 2013. (Bridal Chorus, Crudel! Perche finora, Voi che sapate, Soave Si il Vento, Tosca Act II Duet and offstage, Vesti la giubba, Voyager's Chorus, Lamento di Federico, Flower Duet, Casta Diva, O mimi tu piu non torni, Dio di Giuda, Stride la Vampa, O Terra Addio, Come paride vesozzo, Quando m'en vo, Bella figlia dell'amore, Va Pensiero). Chorus Master Jonathon Swinard; Accompanist Julia Lynch; Soloists Christina Dunwoodie, Ivor Klayman, Jessica Leary, Clare Shearer, Ralph Strehle, William Turner, Anders Oestberg, Sarah Gross; Compere Donald Maxwell. An American Night at the Opera St Andrew's and St George's West Church. 8 March 2014. Chorus Master Jonathon Swinard; Accompanist Julia Lynch; Soloists Christina Dunwoodie (Artistic Director), Ralph Strehle, Ivor Klayman, Taylor Wilson, Timothy Dawkins, Jennifer Craig, David Horton, Jonathan Cooke, James Corrigan.
- 2014-2015 Come and Sing Event in aid of EMMS International The Pilgrim's Progress St Andrew's and St George's West Church. 20 September 2014. Conductor Susannah Wapshott; Accompanist Geoffrey Tanti; Soloists Ivor Klayman, Susan McNaught, Laura Margaret Smith, Jonathan Cooke; Shining Ones Angela Estrada, Theodora Burrows, Rebecca Greenhalgh.
- 2016-2017 60 Years of Edinburgh Grand Opera. St Andrew's and St George's West Church. 11 February 2017. Conductor Susannah Wapshott; Accompanist Julia Lynch; Soloists Angela Estrada, Ivor Klayman, David Lynn, Susan McNaught, Douglas Nairne; Compere Frances McCafferty. 60 Years of Edinburgh Grand Opera. Brunton Theatre, Musselburgh. 24 August 2017. Conductor Matthew Brown; Accompanist Claire Haslin; Soloists Ivor Klayman, Susan McNaught, Angela Estrada and David Lynn.

=== Work with other companies ===
- 1993-1994 The Recruiting Officer. Royal Lyceum Theatre. Between 10 and 25 September 1993. Extras for Royal Lyceum Theatre Company production. Dramatist George Farquhar; Director Kenny Ireland; Composer James Bruce; Designer Russell Craig; Lighting Andy Phillips; Fight Director Denis Agnew; Performers Iain Andrew, Bob Barrett, Selina Boyack, Rebecca Charles, Phelim Drew, Andy Gray, Jules Melvin, Rosaleen Phelan, Toby Salaman, Patrick Toomey.
- 2006-2007 White Christmas Party Carol Singing Scottish National Portrait Gallery. 1 December 2006
- 2008-2009 Christmas Carols Edinburgh Castle for Historic Scotland. December 2008. Opera Gala Night Glasgow Royal Concert Hall. 30 December 2008. (including music from Carmen, La Boheme, Prince Igor, Cavalleria Rusticana, Pearl Fishers, Lakme, Il Trovatore, La Traviata, Madama Butterfly, Turandot, Barber of Seville and Rigoletto). Concert for Raymond Gubbay Organisation with additional Chorus from Scottish Opera. Conductor Robin Stapleton with the Scottish Concert Orchestra; Soloists Mary Plazas, Clare Shearer, Gwyn Hughes Jones, Grant Doyle.
- 2009-2010 Christmas Carols Edinburgh Castle for Historic Scotland. December 2009.
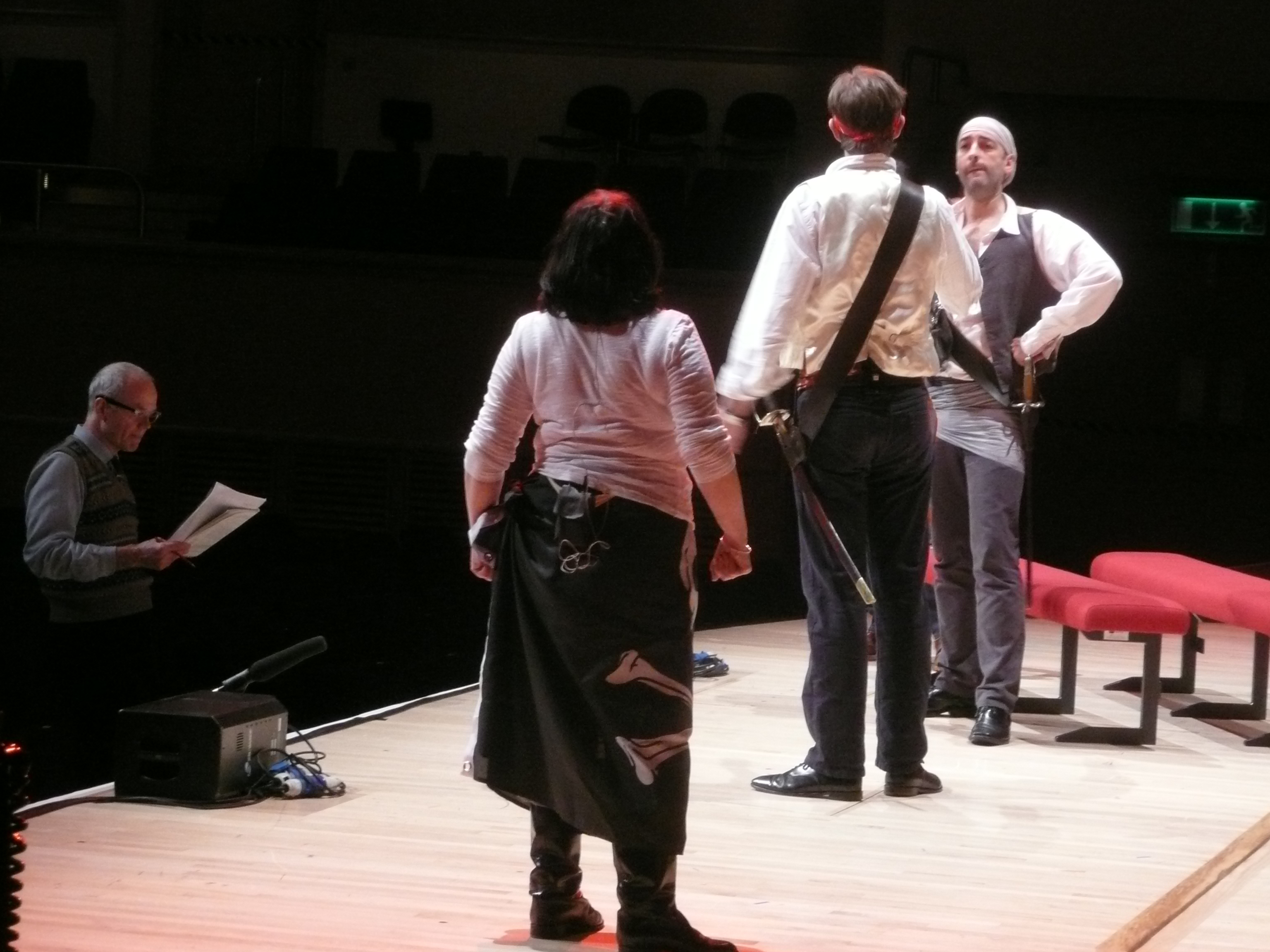
  Pirates of Penzance Rehearsal at the Glasgow Royal Concert Hall
- 2010-2011 Christmas Carols Edinburgh Castle for Historic Scotland. 11 December 2010. The Mikado Glasgow Royal Concert Hall. 27 December; Usher Hall. 28 December 2010. Semi-staged concert for Raymond Gubbay Organisation with The Savoyards. Director Alistair McGowan; Soloists Alistair McGowan (The Mikado), Oliver White (Nanki-Poo), Charlotte Page (Yum-Yum), Richard Stuart (Ko-Ko), Bruce Graham (Pooh-Bah), Jill Pert (Katisha).

=== Sound track ===
- 2003 Does God Play Football? Chorus music for the film, recorded at Craigmillar Park Church, and sung by members of Edinburgh Grand Opera, led by Richard Lewis;Director Mike Walker (Michael A. Walker); Producers Jonathan G. Brown, Rebecca Knapp; starring Helen McCrory (playing Sarah Ward), Kevin McKidd (playing Father Davis).

== Charitable status ==
Edinburgh Grand Opera was a Scottish registered charity, no. SC003143.
