= James Davidson (Scottish architect) =

Scottish architect

- Born: 1848
- Died: April 1923 (aged 74–75)
- Education: Airdrie Academy
- Occupation: Architect
- Children: Alexander Davidson
- Parent: Alexander "Sandy" Davidson
- Practice: James Davidson & Son
- Buildings: King's Theatre, Edinburgh, Airdrie Savings Bank

James Davidson, JP FRIBA (1848 – April 1923) was a Scottish architect. He also served as a Provost of Coatbridge and a President of Airdrie Savings Bank.

== Early life and education ==
Davidson was born in 1848 in Airdrie, North Lanarkshire, the son of a weaver. He was educated at Airdrie Academy and initially trained as a joiner. As a teenager he moved to Glasgow and attended classes at the Athenaeum in Ingram Street.

== Career ==
In 1905 and 1906, Davidson designed the King's Theatre, Edinburgh, in collaboration with J. D. Swanston. Davidson was responsible for designing the exterior and Swanston designed the interior.

Davidson designed many schools for the Old Monklands School Board between 1892 and 1914. These included Calderbank Public School (1892), Bargeddie Primary School (1894), Greenhill Primary School (1902), Gartsherrie Primary School (1906) and Langloan Primary School (1914).

On 10 November 1909, Davidson was elected Provost of Coatbridge. He continued in this role until 1912.

In 1920 he designed the building of Airdrie Savings Bank. From 1921 until his death in April 1923, Davidson served as the tenth President of Airdrie Savings Bank.

== Personal life ==
In 1877 and 1878, Davidson served as the Master of the Operative Lodge of Airdrie No 203, part of the Freemasons.
