= Airdrie Savings Bank =

Scottish commercial bank (1835–2017)

- Company type: Savings bank
- Industry: Finance and insurance
- Founded: 1835
- Founder: Dr William Clark (first President)
- Defunct: 28 April 2017
- Headquarters: Airdrie, Scotland, UK
- Key people: Roderick Ashley (CEO); Jeremy Brettell (non executive chairman)
- Products: Financial services
- Website: www.airdriesavingsbank.com

Airdrie Savings Bank was a small commercial bank operation in the Lanarkshire area of Scotland. It ran nine branches throughout the area, with its head office in Airdrie at the time of the announcement of its closure. Total assets of the bank at 31 October 2013 were £158 million with a reported loss of £267,000. In January 2017, the bank announced it would begin closure proceedings on 28 April of that year.

== Corporate structure ==
Airdrie Savings Bank was the only remaining independent savings bank in the UK. It operated on mutual principles, had no shareholders and was instead governed by a board of trustees, appointed to represent the interests of depositors and to ensure that the bank was managed properly.

In addition to Airdrie, there were branches in Bellshill and Coatbridge at the time of the announcement of its closure.

== History ==
The first true savings bank was established by Rev. Henry Duncan in the Dumfriesshire village of Ruthwell in 1810. Duncan's model was rapidly adopted across Scotland, the rest of the UK and continental Europe. In 1924 the world's first International Thrift Congress was held in Milan and there were representatives there from 350 institutions around the world.

Airdrie Savings Bank was instituted in 1835 by the efforts of four “founding fathers” – Rev. John Carslaw (a local church minister and strong advocate of the temperance movement); Dr William Clark (a retired doctor and member of a wealthy old Airdrie family); Rev. Andrew Ferrier (another local minister); and James Knox (a local hat and cap manufacturer). The first board of directors included several weavers, a blacksmith, a schoolmaster, a stonemason, a tailor and a salesman. Indeed, the blacksmith was vice-president of the bank for over twenty years.

The first account was opened on 21 January 1835 with a deposit of £2 10s and by the end of 1835 a total of £355 had been deposited (over £39,000 in 2025). The first branch was opened in the Session House of a local church but the church closed in 1841 and the bank moved to the shop premises of a tailor where it remained for twenty years before relocating to a hat shop. Finally, a purpose-built independent office was established in the town in 1883. By 1885 the bank total deposits had risen to £20,000 (£2 million in 2025) and within a decade this figure increased ten-fold to £200,000 (£23 million in 2025). At the same time the number of customers more than quadrupled from 1,100 to 4,600. Deposits continued to double every decade such that by 1916 they had reached the £1 million mark (£75 million in 2025).

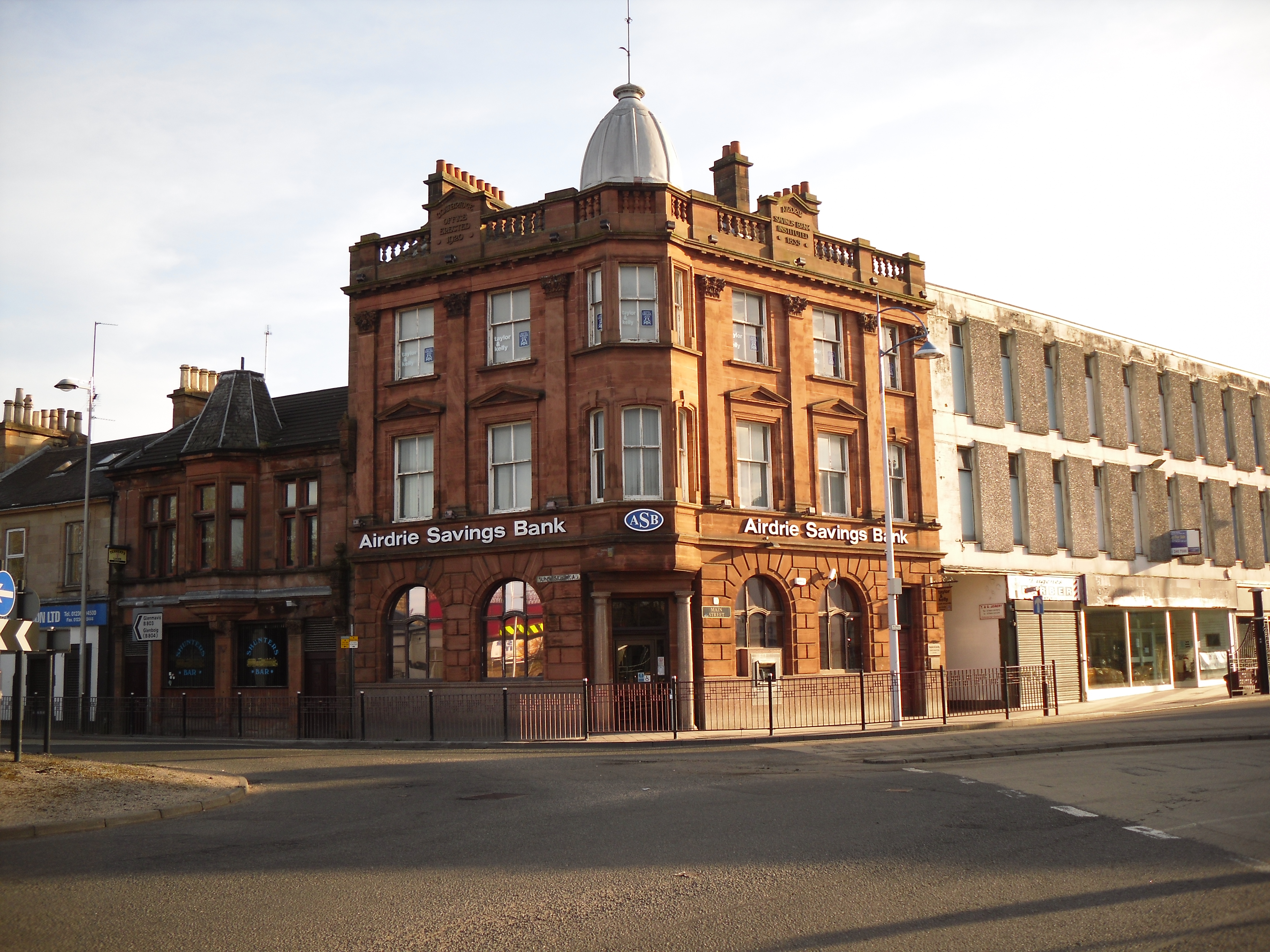
Branch in Coatbridge

During the First World War the bank continued to expand, opening new branches in Coatbridge (1916) and Bellshill (1917). In 1925 the head office in Airdrie relocated to new premises at the bottom of Wellwynd in the town where it remains today. Further expansion in the 1930s resulted in new branches in Shotts and Muirhead (both 1931) and Ballieston (1936). A second Coatbridge branch, Whifflet followed in 1969, Motherwell in 1997 and Falkirk in 2011.

In August 2010 it was announced that a new branch would be opened after a cash injection of £10 million, from a group of Scottish entrepreneurs who support the bank's mutual model. Sir Angus Grossart, Sir David Murray, Ann Gloag, Brian Souter, Sir Tom Farmer and Ewan Brown each provided £1 million. Soutar stated that "Airdrie Savings Bank represents what Scottish banks once stood for – security of funds, a focus on savings and outstanding personal service". He went on to say that: "We believe the mutual principle is fundamental to the integrity of the bank. We are doing this because so many Scots are dismayed at what has happened within the banking sector".

On 28 May 2015, the bank announced that the branches at Baillieston, Muirhead, Motherwell and Shotts would close on 28 August. The Falkirk branch closed in April 2016.

In January 2017, the board of trustees of Airdrie Savings Bank resolved that the bank should be wound up as a result of changing customer requirements and the increasing cost of regulation. The three remaining branches, including the head office, would close and customer deposits would be returned or transferred to other financial institutions. Mortgages and secured loans were to be transferred to TSB Bank plc, and any outstanding deposits were to be transferred to Wesleyan Bank.

== List of presidents of Airdrie Savings Bank ==
Name	Presidency
Dr William Clark, JP	1835 - 1837
Rev John Carslaw	1837 - 1840
Rev Andrew Ferrier	1840 - 1841
Rev John Carslaw	1841 - 1848
James Knox	1848 - 1861
Rev James McGown	1861 - 1866
Telford Martin	1866 - 1890
Thomas Jeffrey, JP	1890 - 1906
David Martyn, JP	1906 - 1918
William Neilson, JP	1919 - 1921
James Davidson, JP FRIBA	1921 - 1923
D. Rankine, JP	1923 - 1926
Thomas Armour, JP	1926 - 1928
William Fraser	1928-1931
John Kennedy	1931-1932
David Martyn	1932-1935
John McGregor	1935-1938
John Harkness	1938-1941
Col. J. Maurice Arthur	1941-1944
Major W.A. Chapman	1944-1947
James Tennent	1947-1950
James Russell	1950-1953
Lt Col. John Macfarlane	1953-1956
James R. Cunningham	1956-1959
Robert Paterson	1959-1963
John G. McGregor	1963-1966
Hugh K. Symington	1966-1968
Peter S. Murray	1968-1970
William A Nelson	1970-1972
Andrew M.S. Cleland	1972-1974
Andrew H.S. Marshall	1974-1976
John O. Ormerod	1976-1978
Graham T. Cargey	1978-1980
Wm Norman Law	1980-1982
Robert L. Paterson	1982-1984
William Irvine	1984-1986
Christopher J. Ormerod, CA	1986-1988
William M. Ross FFA	1988-1990
John C.A. Sword	1990-1992
Harold F. Hamilton	1992-1994
Alexander F. Bankier FRAgS	1994-1996
Gilbert K. Cox MBE, DL, JP	1996-1998
James C. Osborne BL	1998-2000
David J. McCallum	2000-2002
James Armstong JP	2002-2004
Alexander A. McArthur, Msc, CEng, MICE, FIHT	2004-2006
David H. Towers	2006-2008
Christopher J. Ormerod, CA	2008-2010
Robert Boyle	2010-2012
James Armstrong JP	2013
Christopher J. Ormerod, CA	2014-2017
