= Paul Towndrow =

Scottish saxophonist and composer (born 1978)

Paul Towndrow (born 13 December 1978) is a Scottish saxophonist, composer, arranger and educator. He won the Audience Prize at The 2003 World Saxophone Competition and is a member of Scotland’s flagship jazz orchestra, the Scotland National Jazz Orchestra.

His 2009 album, Newology, attracted a four star review in The Guardian.

== Discography ==
=== Solo ===
- Paul Towndrow: Colours - 2003 FMR Records
- Paul Towndrow: Out Of Town - 2005 Keywork Records
- Paul Towndrow: Six By Six - 2007 Keywork Records
- Paul Towndrow: Newology - 2009 Keywork Records
- Paul Towndrow Trio: EP1 - 2013 Keywork Records
- Paul Towndrow & Steve Hamilton Duo: We Shine The Sun - 2016 Keywork Records
- Paul Towndrow: Deepening The River - 2020 Keywork Records
- Paul Towndrow: Outwith The Circle - 2023 Keywork Records
