= Curtis Kulig =

American artist (born 1981)

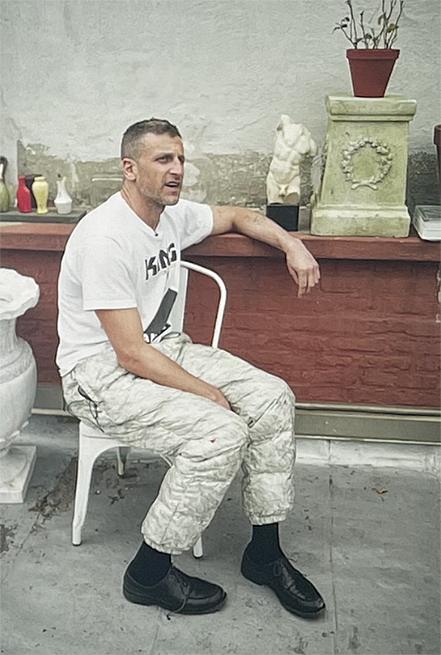
- Born: Curtis-Ross Kulig; Minot, North Dakota
- Known for: Artist
- Website: www.curtiskulig.com

Curtis Kulig is an American artist who lives and works in New York City.

== Early life ==
Kulig was born in 1981 in Minot, North Dakota. At a young age he was encouraged to follow an artistic path by his uncle Phillip Salvato (American painter) and father Walter Kulig (screen printer). In the year 2000, Kulig moved to Los Angeles at the age of 19. He then moved to New York City in 2007. Kulig attended New York Academy of Art in NYC.

== Artistic ventures ==
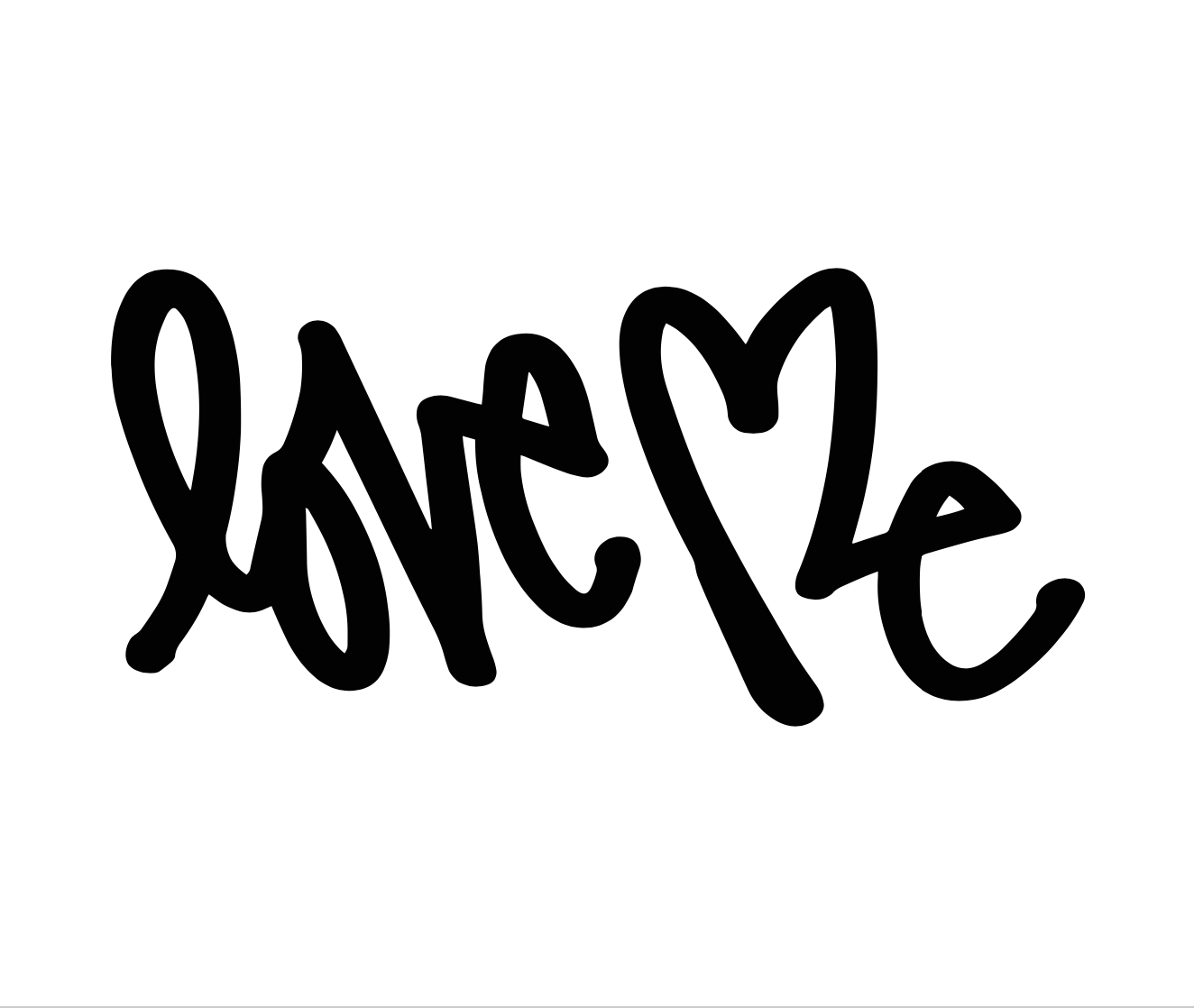
Love Me design by Curtis Kulig

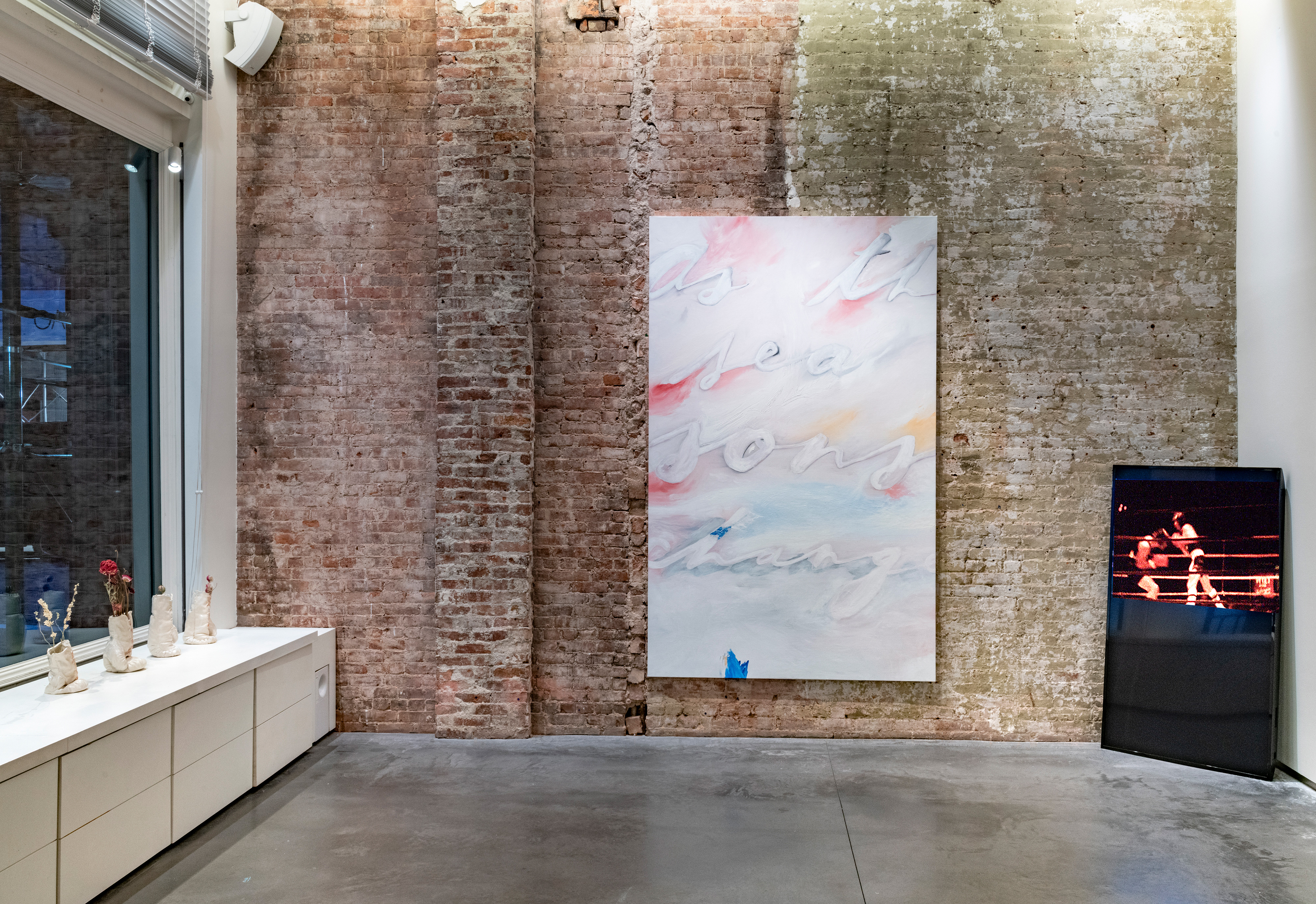

A decade ago, his private plea 'Love Me' became part of the urban fabric of the city. A loyal audience ensued embracing the declaration with hope and optimism making the mark a global icon. His studio practice consists of several mediums including painting, drawing, sculpture, film-making, neon text and film photography. In 2018 he collaborated with Grear Patterson and Yves Scherer on a group show called "Happiness". In this show he debuted his self-help series with a collection of mixed media work. They are collage-like mixtures of harsh brushstrokes, emotive sketches, and a mix of found photographs. He also created a video for the show, 36 Men, which displays thirty-six men demanding love. Later that year he showcased his work in a solo exhibition at Galerie du jour Agnes b. called Prize. The exhibition featured an installation that included more than 30 drawings, ceramics, a large-scale painting, and an 8mm film in which Kulig invited Aska Matsumiya to develop a soundscape.

Kulig also appears in collaborations with Mark Gonzales, Max Blagg, Robert Longo and the New Museum.

== Commercial ventures ==
Kulig is no stranger when it comes to art in the commercial space. Over his career he has worked with hundreds of brands on collaborations using his artwork and designs. Companies such as Nike, Starbucks, and Google have all teamed up with Kulig to create unique pieces showcasing his work.

Notably, Cartier and Kulig teamed up to create "Love Me" branded jewelry. In 2015 the UK-based retailer Topman enlisted Kulig to collaborate on the brand's first collection with an American artist. The eclectic collection, which ranges from $30 to $350, features details of his original artwork in pieces that reflect his signature style. In 2015 Kulig and Japanese fashion designer Issey Miyake collaborated on his signature Bao Bao bags.

He has been featured in the New York Times, Vanity Fair, The Wall Street Journal and Forbes; is a frequent contributor of works to charity auctions including Free Arts, (RED), Art of Elysium, the Tibetan Fund, Hilarity for Charity and Revlon's "Love Is On" Million Dollar Challenge in support of Women's Health.

In 2021 Kulig donated work to the Tribeca Film Festival curated by Vito Schnabel.

In 2022 Kulig worked with Tiffany & Co. whilst retaining his original “Love Me” concept, Kulig also created other love-themed messages such as: “Dare Me,” “Know Me,” and “Kiss Me” to be displayed alongside the Tiffany HardWear, Tiffany Knot and Tiffany T collections.

== Selected works ==
•Scripture (2011), Mallick Williams & Co. Gallery: Kullig's large paintings of textured patterns were intentionally displayed in shrink wrap and staged in the corner of the gallery, leaving visitors to wonder if the work was out of place.

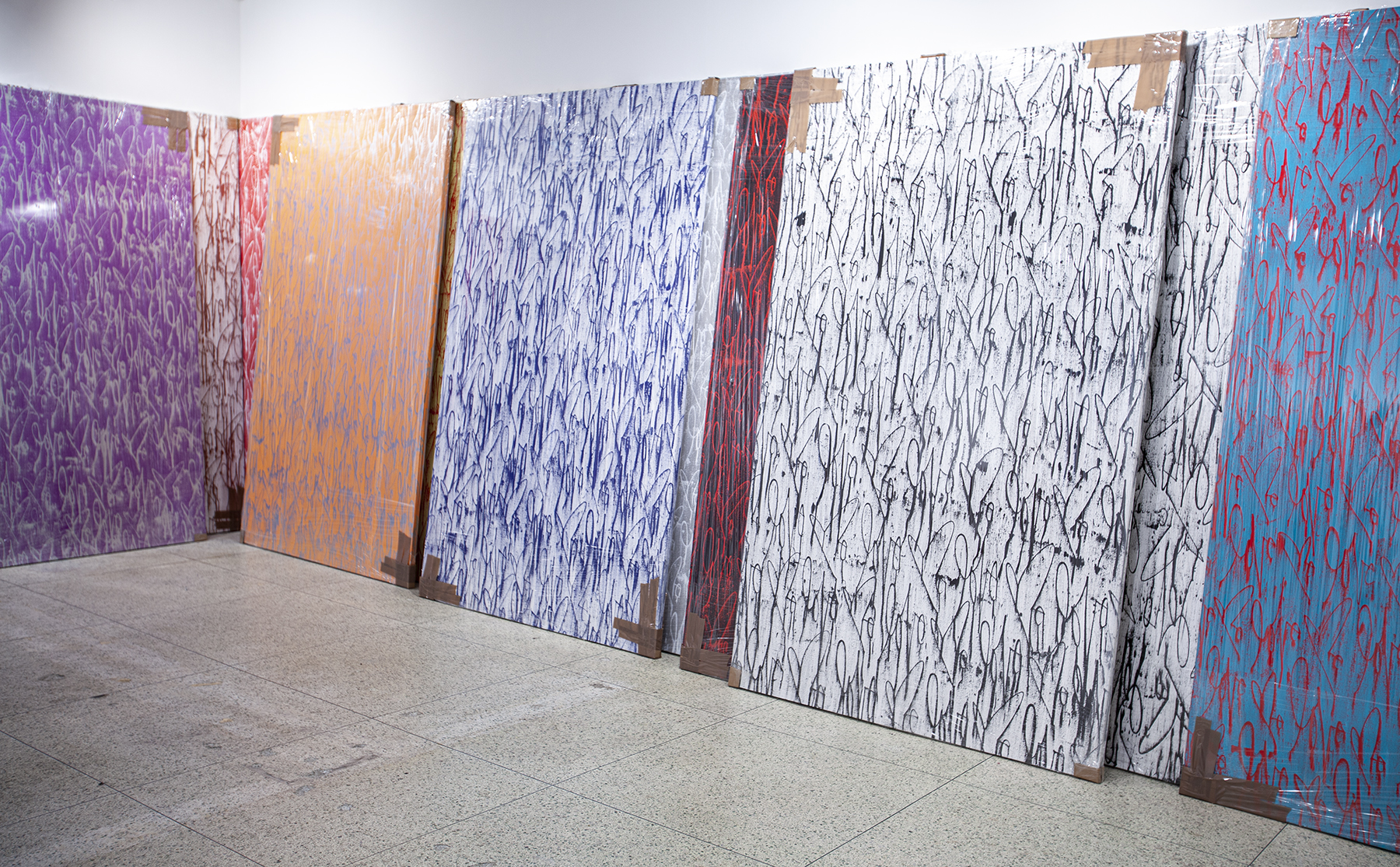
Scripture (2011) Mallack Williams Co Gallery

•Happiness (2018): a group show in which Kulig contributed large-scale mixed media paintings and video. The paintings are collage-like mixtures of harsh brush strokes, emotive sketches, and original photographs.

•Prize, Pacific Publishing, (2018): a book by Kulig featuring forty mixed media works on paper that explore the nuanced and poetic movement of twisting figures from the sport of boxing.

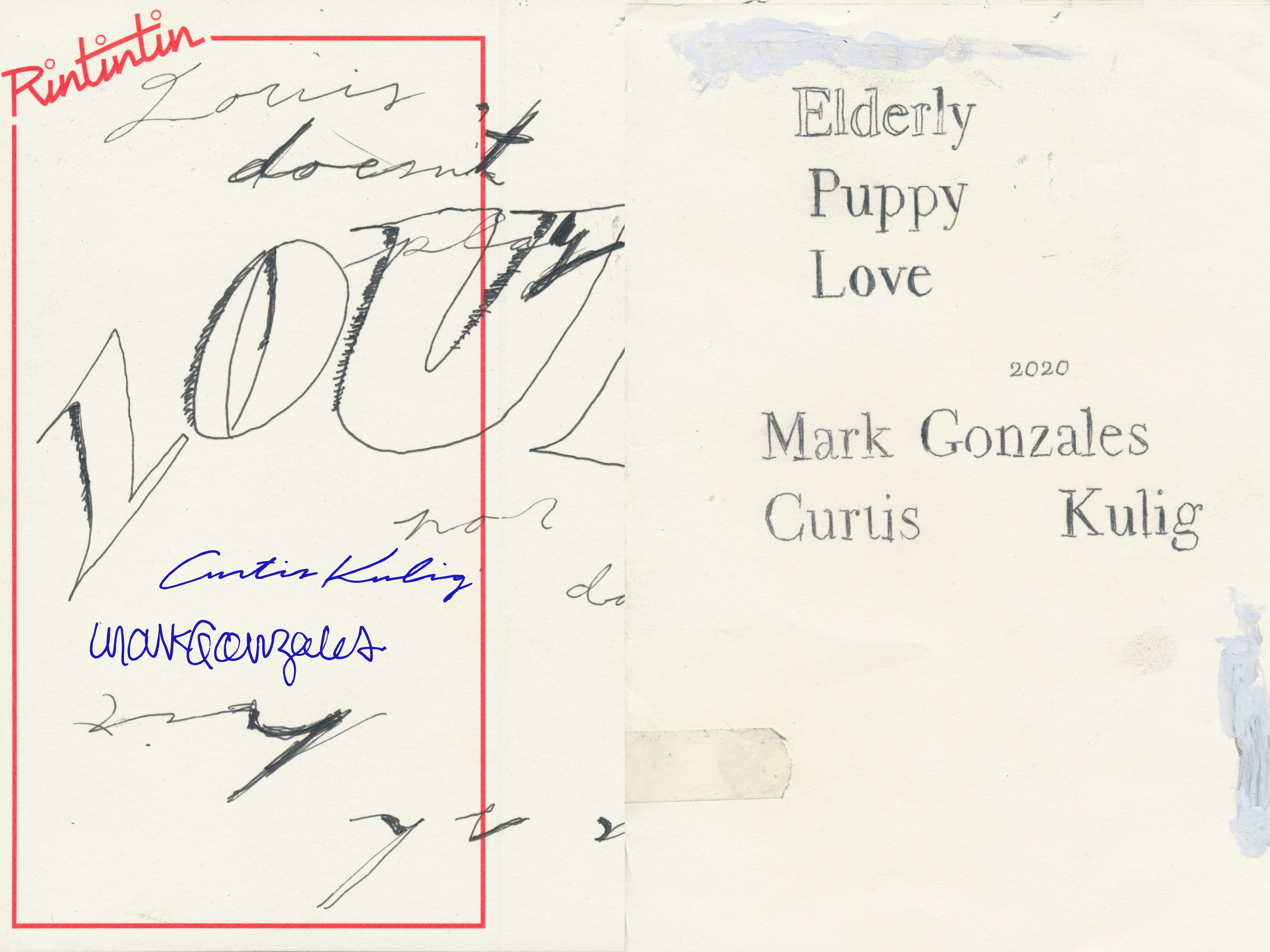
Elderly Puppy Love with Mark Gonzales

•Elderly Puppy Love, Brizzolis, (2020), Kulig and collaborator Mark Gonzales worked with Spanish publisher Brizzolis to create a 132-page softcover book of original drawings and handwriting, bridging their definitive styles to illustrate iconic cultural figures and convey poetic expressions of American life.

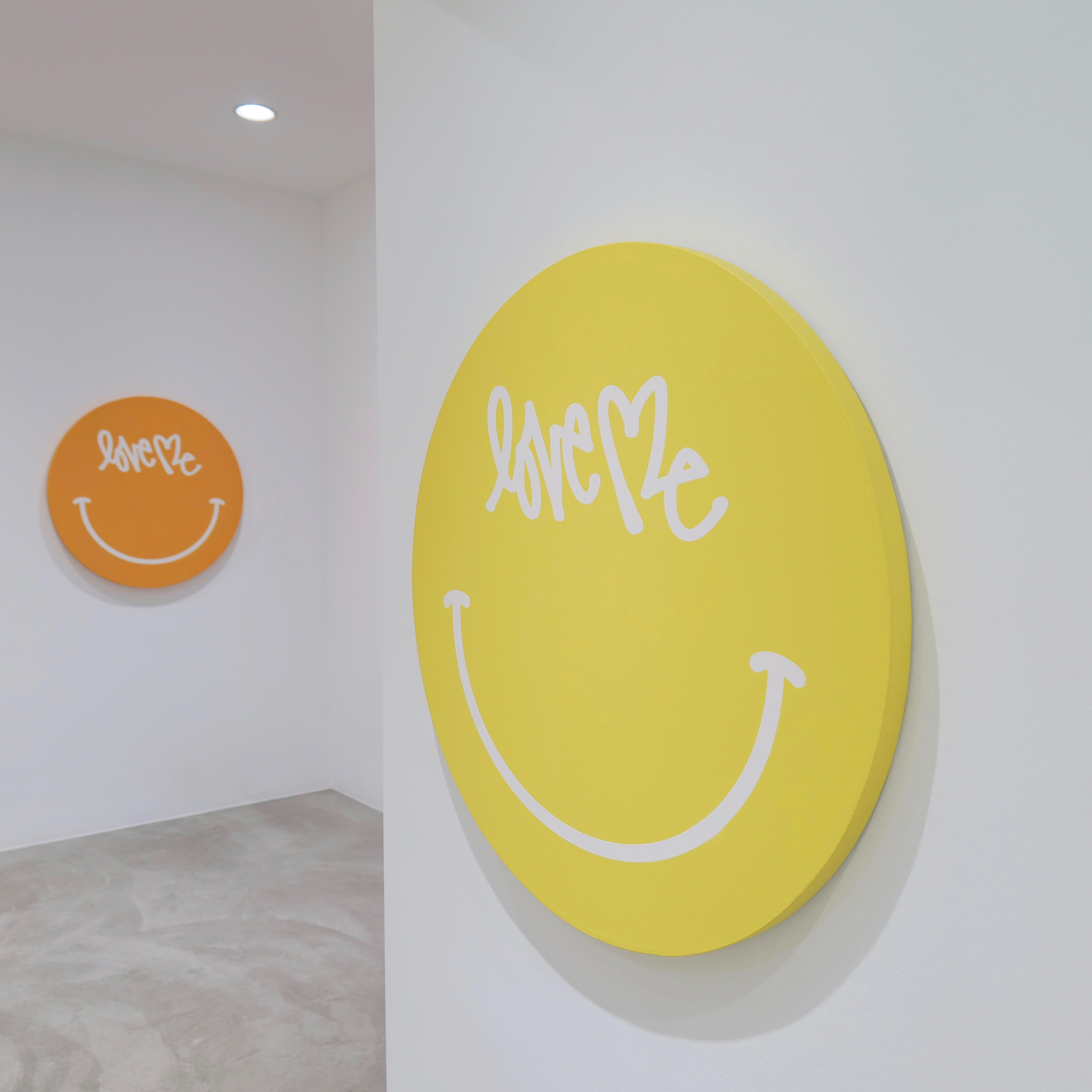
All Smiles (2021) Kantor Gallery

•All Smiles (2021): a solo exhibition at Kantor Gallery by Kulig connecting his signature take on the phrase “love me” with the iconic smiley face into an array of colorful circular-shaped paintings.

•Loud Money, Paradigm Publishing, (2021), After meeting and working together on an abandoned performance piece for the MOMA, Writer Max Blagg and Kulig turned their dynamic friendship into a book of photos, drawings, poems, and paintings often referencing the culture, commotion, and cost of city living. The book features an essay by James “Jamie” Nares.

== Appearances in the media ==
- DKNY Campaign with Cara Delevingne, Fall 2013
- Kanye West 'Yeezus' Album, 2013
- The Gonz X Curtis Kulig, 2015
- The GQ Eye, 2012
- Vans Shoes, 2013
- Terry Richardson's Diary, Fall 2011
- "Scripture" exhibit with Skullphone, Mallick Williams Gallery (NYC), October 2011
- Bedwin and the Heartbreakers capsule collection (Tokyo, Japan), 2018
- "Recine & Associates" exhibit with Steve Olson & Alex Olson, Nyhaus Gallery (NYC), Fall 2011
- Lovecat magazine, cover-title design/Paz de la Huerta, Summer 2011
- Joe Jonas "See No More" album package: Cover artwork, press package, "See No More" video artwork (MTV award for best lyric video), Summer 2011
- Nike, Free Yourself, 2011
- TED Talks x Teens, "The Art of Obsession" talk, Summer 2011
- HBO, Creative Director, How to make it in America, 2010
- Ace Hotel, hotel installation (NYC), 2010
- Installation collaboration with Barry McGee and Sage Vaughn (NYC), 2010
- Saturday Night Live, appears in program intro, 2010
- Nike featured artist
- Purple Magazine, Featured Artist, 2014
- Whitney Art Party, 2014

== Bibliography ==
- Mark Gonzales and Curtis Kulig, Elderly Puppy Love, Brizzolis Publishing, 2020
- Max Blagg and Curtis Kulig, Loud Money, Paradigm Publishing, 2021, ISBN 978-1-7354450-2-1
- Curtis Kulig, Prize, Pacific Publishing, 2021, ISBN 978-1-64467-965-4
