= King's Theatre, Edinburgh =

Theatre in Edinburgh, Scotland

Coordinates: 55°56′30.80″N 3°12′11.04″W

King's Theatre Edinburgh
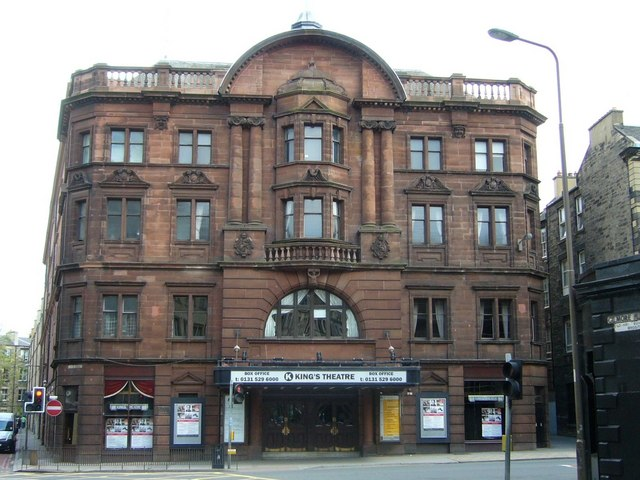
- King's Theatre in 2009
- Interactive map of King's Theatre Edinburgh
- Location: Edinburgh, Scotland
- Owner: City of Edinburgh Council
- Operator: Capital Theatres
- Capacity: 1,125
- Designation: Category A
- Current use: Theatre

Construction
- Opened: 1906
- Architects: James Davidson (exterior) and J. D. Swanston (interior)

Website
- www.capitaltheatres.com/our-venues/kings-theatre/

The Edinburgh King’s Theatre (also known as The Grand Old Lady of Leven Street and The Peoples Theatre) is a performing arts venue located on Leven Street in Edinburgh, Scotland. It is the home of the Edinburgh pantomime and used for drama, dance, musical events and local community groups as well as being a major venue for the Edinburgh International Festival. Following a major redevelopment in 2026 the venue has 1,125 seats and a café open daily.

== History of the theatre ==
The King's became famous for being a venue belonging to the theatre empire Howard & Wyndham. The theatre was originally commissioned by the Edinburgh Building Company Ltd, chaired by Robert C. Buchanan. The King's was built as a rival to the successful Royal Lyceum Theatre, which had been established for over twenty years. Buchanan was experienced in the industry as he already managed a large number of provincial variety theatres, however this was his most ambitious project yet.

The foundation stone was laid on 18 August 1906 by Andrew Carnegie, with copies of the current newspaper and coins buried underneath. During construction the owners experienced financial troubles being unable to pay the final costs to the contractor William Stewart Cruikshank and to the architects, surveyors and lawyers, at which stage the operating rights were transferred to a new King's Theatre Company, of which Cruikshank was a major shareholder. Buchanan was managing director and he took on the day-to-day running of the King's, with Cruikshank's son A. Stewart Cruikshank as manager. An attempt to sell the theatre to Howard & Wyndham Ltd chaired by Michael Simons, and therefore clear the debts, failed and the Cruikshank family decided to run it themselves with A Stewart Cruikshank becoming managing director in June 1908.

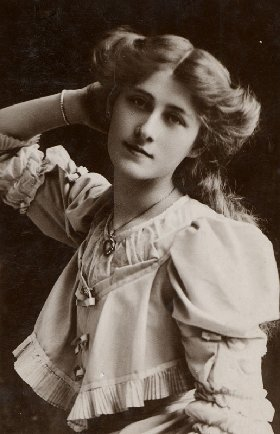
Phyllis Dare, c. 1906

The building opened to audiences for the first time on 8 December 1906, with a festive production of "Cinderella" with Violet Englefield as the Prince and Phyllis Dare as Cinderella. The theatre began a successful career as a variety touring house with later visits from Carl Rosa Opera and Richard D'Oyly Carte's company. Under Cruikshank the bill of fare was widened to include drama, musicals, large scale pantomime, revues and opera.

Cruikshank later realised that his theatre was at a disadvantage by not being part of a larger circuit. In 1928 he sold his theatre to Howard and Wyndham, becoming managing director of the group under the chairmanship of Ernest Simons. Cruikshank, by now one of the leading theatre directors in Britain, became chairman in 1944 on the passing of Ernest Simons.

In 1934 A. Stewart Cruikshank decided it would be worth experimenting with a summer season in Edinburgh along the lines of seaside entertainment. The show, known as The Half Past Eight, had already been a great success at the theatre's Howard & Wyndham namesake in Glasgow, where comic Jack Edge performed to full houses for fourteen weeks. Edge was brought over to Edinburgh to open the show, but with meagre audiences it flopped and lasted just six weeks. Howard and Wyndham brought in Charles and Ilona Ross to produce their winter pantomimes. Charles Ross knew that the normal closing the theatre for the summer was wasting an opportunity, and he wanted to revive the summer show which had failed previously. Cruikshank was at first sceptical, but in 1937 he gave in, and gave the show four weeks to succeed or he would close it. Ross could not find a big star to front the show, and it seemed it was to fail once again. He eventually tracked down a young fairly unknown comic called Dave Willis. Willis was just what Ross had been looking for. The Half Past Eight show opened on 31 May 1937, and was billed as 'An after dinner light revue of song, dance and laughter – also starring Cliff Harley, Florence Hunter and the Charles Ross Girls'. At first, only a few hundred came to see the show, and by the end of the third week Cruikshank was about to close the production. What happened next was not to be expected. News of the show spread by word of mouth and by the end of the following week, the King's was packed nightly with standing room only. The program changed every week. There were big opening and finale numbers with the dancers in sequinned and feathered dresses, and Dave Willis was a hard working individual appearing throughout most of the show. By 1941, the show had stretched to twenty-eight weeks. When Willis moved to open a Glasgow version of the show, Harry Gordon took over. Subsequent stars were Stanley Baxter, Rikki Fulton and Jimmy Logan.

In November 1938, the Covent Garden English Opera Company under the direction of Vladimir Rosing and Albert Coates began a season of seven performances of opera in English.

In 1948 the theatre suffered a terrible blow when A. Stewart Cruikshank was killed in a car accident at the age of 72. However, in true theatre terms, the show must go on, and Howard and Wyndham ensured this was the case. Over the years capacity audiences had taken its toll on the King's auditorium, the King's was soon crying out for refurbishment. In 1950 the glass canopy was replaced by a more modern design. Then attention was turned to improving the interior. The King's closed for ten months, during which time underwent some dramatic structural alterations internally. The building was redecorated, the uppermost balcony was demolished, and then the rake of the Upper Circle was increased and extended back. The sight lines had now been much improved, and this had resulted in the capacity being reduced dramatically. The theatre was opened partially for the 1951 Edinburgh Festival, with its Dress Circle closed off. It was closed once more for refurbishment works to be completed. The King's finally reopened again on 14 December 1951 with the pantomime "Puss in Boots". Over the 1950s and '60s the variety productions continued their success.

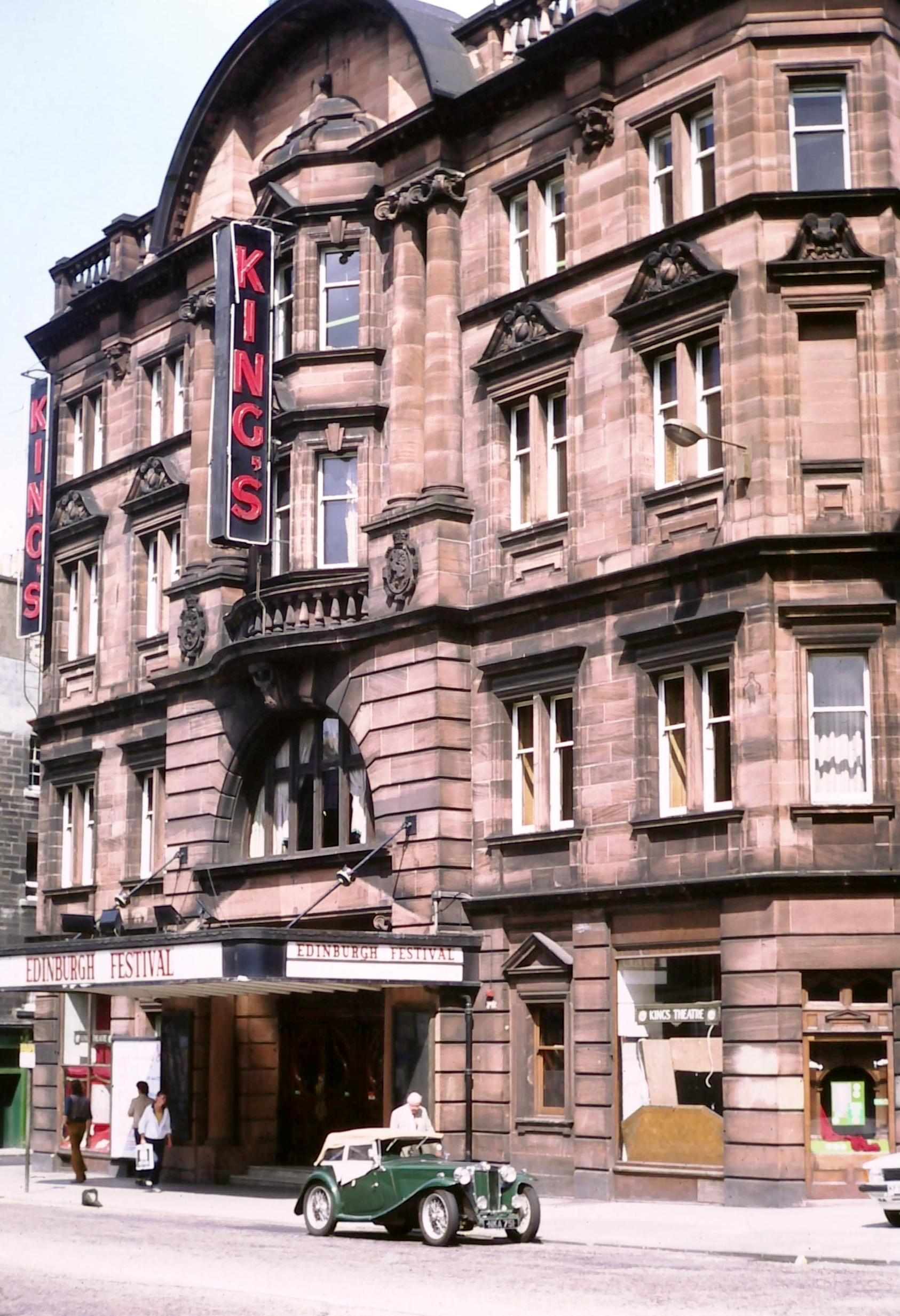
The King's in 1981

It was in 1960 that the first Edinburgh Gang Show took to the stage. Over 100 Boy Scouts enthusiastically performed their first Ralph Reader Gang Show to great acclaim which then started an annual tradition for both the Scouts of Edinburgh and for the King's Theatre, as they prepared for pantomime season. The show continues today with over 200 young people aged between 8 and 25 from Scouting and Girl Guiding in Edinburgh regularly taking part.

By the late 1960s, the increasing popularity of television meant that fees for stars were ever increasing, and this spelled the end of theatre. Without subsidy, large theatres such as the King's were doomed, and many would not live to tell the tale. In 1969, the theatre was offered and sold by Howard & Wyndham to Edinburgh City Council, to secure the theatre's future and its part in Edinburgh International Festivals and as a venue for Scottish Opera. At this time the King's was the most prominent theatre in the city, with the larger Empire now used for bingo, and the huge Playhouse still being used as a super-cinema. In 1970 the theatre was designated as a Category A listed building In 1985 the council invested £1.25m in the King's. The woodwork, carpets, glass and marble were restored, and in the auditorium the aisles were widened, and new seats more akin to a multiplex cinema were installed, and the apron and orchestra pit were increased.

The theatre is home to Edinburgh's mainstream annual pantomime, which is produced by Qdos Entertainment. The theatre is now run by the Capital Theatres, which also controls the Festival Theatre, and is also an important venue over the Festival period.

The theatre closed in 2022 for refurbishment, aimed at preserving its historic features, upgrading its technical and hospitality facilities and making it more accessible, with level access from the street to the seats and stage, lifts, wheelchair seating and an accessible dressing room. During the rebuild, a bottle sealed with plaster was found behind the gold crown decoration in the auditorium. Inside was a list of the names of the architects and plasterers who had worked on the building in 1905. The theatre reopened on 1 August 2026, with the first performance scheduled for the following week. The project cost £41 million, with the Governments of Scotland and the UK and Edinburgh City Council providing additional funding after inflation increased costs.

== Building ==
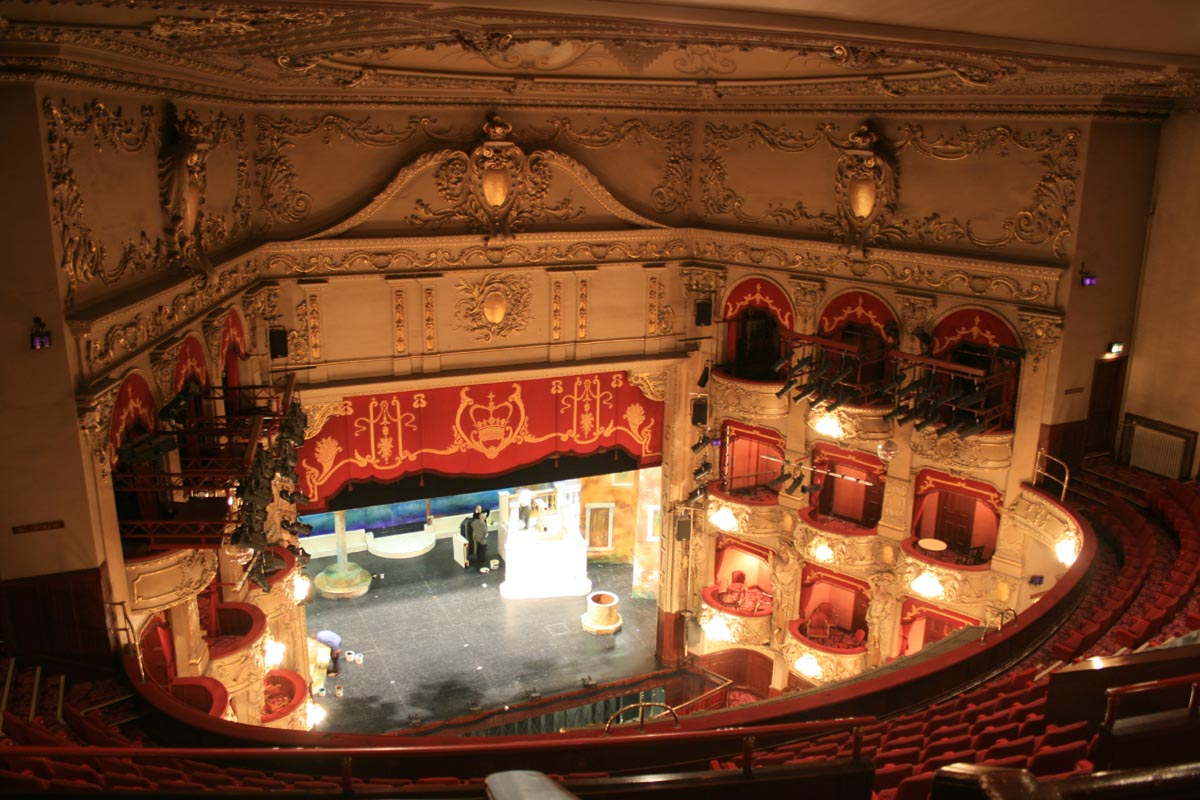
Interior detail, Upper Circle

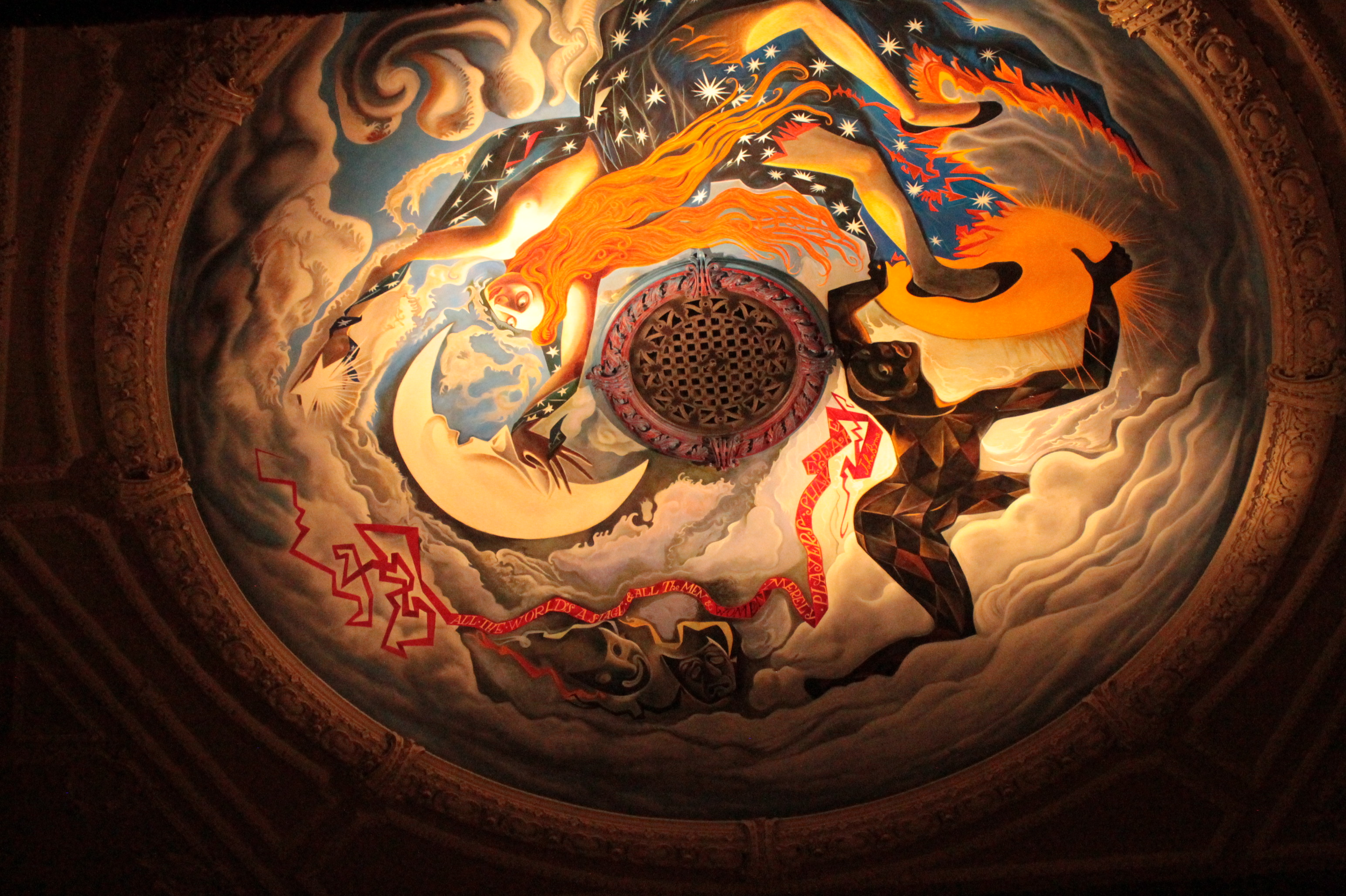
Ceiling mural by John Byrne

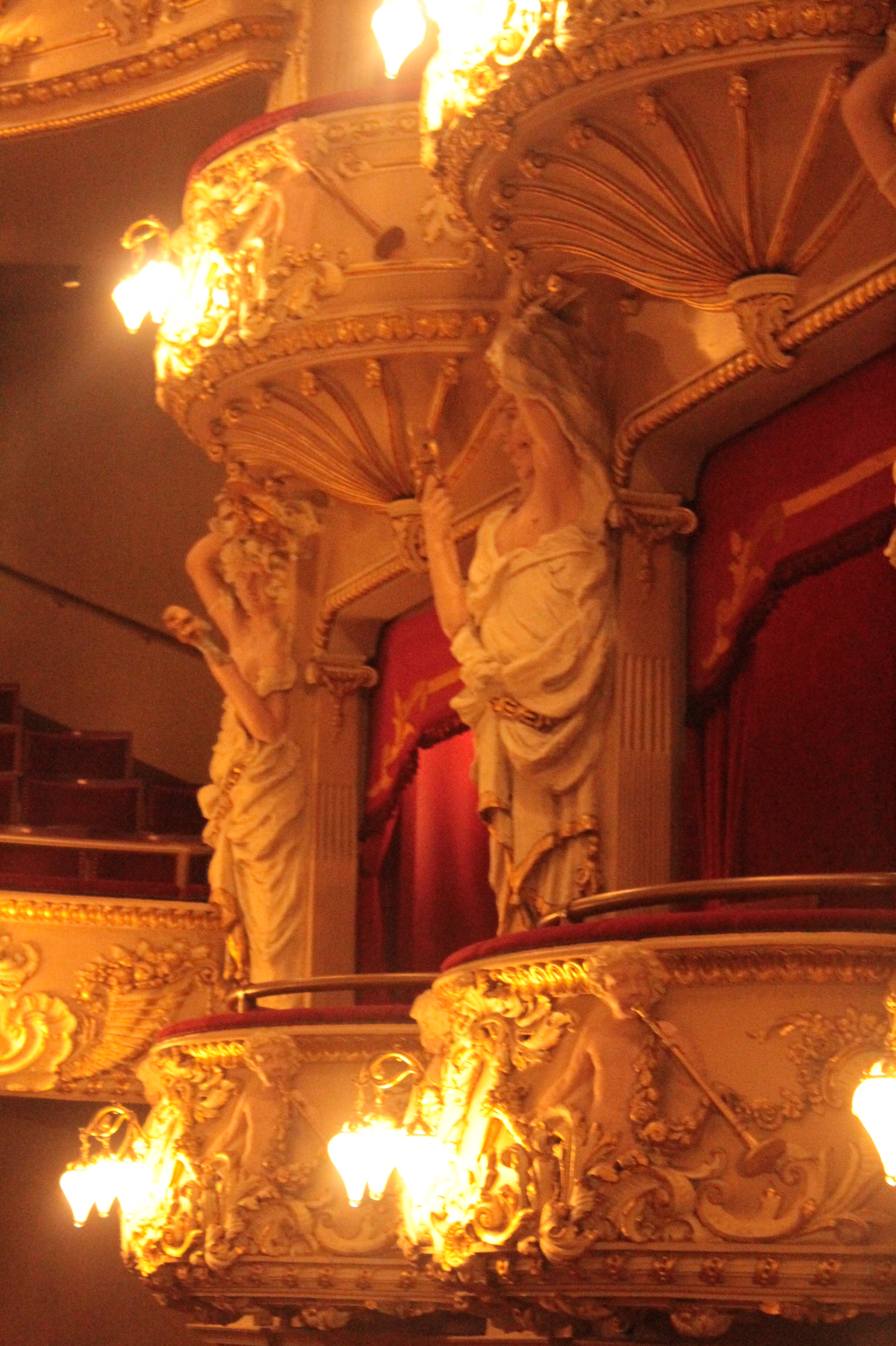
Side boxes and plasterwork

The theatre's interior and exterior were designed separately. James Davidson designed the building itself. He was a well known Coatbridge architect who designed many churches, schools, banks and offices in Lanarkshire and the King's is typical of his Lanarkshire municipal building design. The building's facade is distinctly symmetrical, and looks more like the offices of an insurance company than a theatre. The building originally had a glass canopy spanning over the pavements, however this was replaced with a more modern design in the mid 20th century. The facade has neatly arranged double windows, and a central feature design with pillars, bay windows and a semi-circular window above the entrance.

The interior of the King's was designed by J.D. Swanston, a Kirkcaldy architect with many theatres to his credit, including the King's Theatre, Kirkcaldy. Swanston repeated much of the styling and layout of that theatre, opened in 1904, in his design of the Edinburgh King's.

The foyers have mahogany woodwork including heavily carved door frames, marble pilasters, stained glass and parquet floors. The auditorium originally had seating for 2,500, with tip up seats in the stalls and circles, and upholstered benches with metal arm rests in the top Balcony. After a number of alterations the auditorium now seats 1,350, just over half the original capacity. The design in the auditorium is a feast for the eyes. The boxes are arranged over three levels, and are tiered neatly on top of each other. The sight lines in the theatre were poor as the architects were not as experienced as others in the same field. Some of the boxes had abysmal views of the stage, and the Balcony looked out on the plasterwork above the proscenium rather than the stage itself. These were however, small criticisms as the theatre's qualities far outweighed the faults.

In 2013 a mural was added in the central ceiling roundel, designed by John Byrne and titled All The World's a Stage.

== See also ==
- Edinburgh amateur theatre
- List of theatres in Scotland

== Sources ==
- Peter, Bruce (1999). Scotland's Splendid Theatres: Architecture and Social History from the Reformation to the Present Day. Edinburgh: Polygon. ISBN 0-7486-6261-8.
- Earl, John; Sell, Michael (2000). The Theatres Trust Guide to British Theatres, 1750–1950: a Gazetteer. London: A. & C. Black. ISBN 0-7136-5688-3.
