= The Flying Pigs =

Musical sketch comedy team

Flying Pig Productions
- Industry: Theatre/Radio production
- Founded: 1995
- Headquarters: Aberdeen, Scotland
- Website: www.flyingpigproductions.co.uk

The Flying Pigs are a musical sketch comedy team based in Aberdeen in the north-east of Scotland that has received some UK-wide coverage due to their BBC Scotland radio show Desperate Fishwives.

== History ==
After the success of the Aberdeen Student Show during the 1990s, several members of the script team, during the 1993 last night party, toyed with the idea of creating a new group to serve as a forum for sketch based comedy ideas which did not fit within the confines of Student Show. Writers Greg Gordon, Andrew Brebner, Charles Sandison, Ewan MacGillivray and Grant Campbell started meeting on a regular basis, creating new characters and ideas. After a while, due to other commitments and relocations, only Gordon and Brebner remained; but by the end of 1995 they had enough material to put on a show. The then director of Student Show, John Hardie, was asked to direct the show, and the original cast, all Student Show alumni, were assembled. The first show, Last Tango in Powis was debuted at the Lemon Tree Theatre on 19 February 1996.

== Language ==
The shows themselves use a large lexicon of words from the 'Doric' dialect which is particular to the North East of Scotland. Indeed it was this use of the Lowland Scots dialect that seemed to be one of the attractions to the BBC. The use of Doric allows for humour to be built on the language as well as the situations and characters in the sketches.

== Influences ==
One of the major influences on the group is the group Scotland the What? who, like The Flying Pigs, also formed after meeting each other at the University of Aberdeen. John Hardie of the Flying Pigs is the son of Scotland the What? star, William "Buff” Hardie. The group cemented their reputation in the City and connection to STW? by performing at the 'Freedom of the City of Aberdeen' reception for Scotland the What?

== Productions ==
- Last Tango in Powis (1998, Lemon Tree Studio Theatre)
- Where Seagulls Dare (1999, Lemon Tree Studio Theatre)
- Stanley Cooslick's Clockwork Sporran (2000, Lemon Tree Studio Theatre)
- All Quiet on the Westburn Front (2001, Lemon Tree Studio Theatre)
- Prime Cuts - The Best of Flying Pig (2001, Aberdeen Arts Centre)
- The Madness of Kingwells (2002, Aberdeen Arts Centre)
- The Hunchback of Walker Dam (2004, Lemon Tree Studio Theatre)
- Best Back - The Best of Flying Pig (2004, HMT at Hilton)
- The Seagull has Landed (2005, His Majesty's Theatre)
- Desperate Fishwives- Stage Show (2007, His Majesty's Theatre)
- Desperate Fishwives- Radio Show (2007, 2009, 2010, BBC Radio Scotland)
- How to Look Good Glaikit (2009, His Majesty's Theatre)
- Desperate Fishwives - TV Pilot (2010, BBC Scotland)
- The Silence of the Bams (2011, His Majesty's Theatre)
- Finzean in the Rain (2013, His Majesty's Theatre)
- A Bit of Crackling (2015, His Majesty's Theatre)
- The Seagull has Landed (2015, King's Theatre, Edinburgh)
- Dreich Encounter (2016, His Majesty's Theatre)
- Now That's What I Call Methlick (2018, His Majesty's Theatre)
- The Rothienorman Picture Show (2022, His Majesty's Theatre)
- The Fashed and The Furious (2025, His Majesty's Theatre)

== BBC Scotland ==
In 2007 BBC Radio Scotland approached the Group, following their His Majesty's Theatre stage show, Desperate Fishwives, to make a show for radio. Later on that year it was broadcast. Following the success of the first series, a second radio series was broadcast in 2008. A third series was broadcast in December 2010 throughout Christmas week, culminating in a special Christmas Day episode. In 2009, it was confirmed that the BBC were interested in creating a TV pilot, and in April 2010 BBC Scotland filmed this TV pilot on location in the North East using the "Desperate Fishwives" title. The pilot aired on BBC2 Scotland on 14 December 2010.
