= Norman Harper =

British writer

Norman Harper (born 7 September 1957) is an author, book editor, journalist and broadcaster, and for 27 years was a writer, features editor, and latterly leader-writer and columnist with the Scottish newspaper, the Press and Journal. He is the author of the successful Stronach book series and Spik o the Place, and co-author (with Robbie Shepherd) of four anthologies of anecdotes relating to the Doric dialect of the North East of Scotland, published by Canongate Books and Birlinn as the Dash o Doric series.

He was convicted of possession of indecent images of children at Aberdeen Sherriff Court on 28 February 2018.

== Publications ==
- Harper, Norman, Stronach, Volume 1 (SML, 1992)
- Harper, Norman, Stronach, Volume 2 (SML, 1993)
- Harper, Norman, Stronach, Volume 3 (SML, 1994)
- Harper, Norman, A Dash o Doric (Canongate Books, 1995) with Robbie Shepherd
- Harper, Norman, Anither Dash o Doric (Canongate Books, 1996) with Robbie Shepherd
- Harper, Norman, First Daily (AJL, 1997)
- Harper, Norman, Spik o the Place (Canongate Books, 1998)
- Harper, Norman, Weeks in the Howe (AJL, 1999)
- Harper, Norman, Fortnights (AJL, 2001)
- Harper, Norman, Dash o Doric: The Hale Lot (Birlinn, 2003) with Robbie Shepherd
- Harper, Norman, Stronach, Volume 4 (Birlinn, 2003)
- Harper, Norman, Dash o Doric: One for the Road (Birlinn, 2004) with Robbie Shepherd
- Harper, Norman, Eighty Glorious Years (SML, 2008)
- Harper, Norman, Spikkin Doric (Birlinn, 2009)
