= Doric dialect =

Doric dialect may refer to:

- Doric Greek, a Greek dialect
- Doric dialect (Scotland), a Scots dialect
