= Doric language =

Doric language may refer to:

- Doric Greek, an Ancient Greek dialect
- Doric dialect (Scotland), a variety of the Scots language
