= Aberdeen Arts Centre =

Arts centre in Aberdeen, Scotland

- Ionad Ealain Obar Dheathain
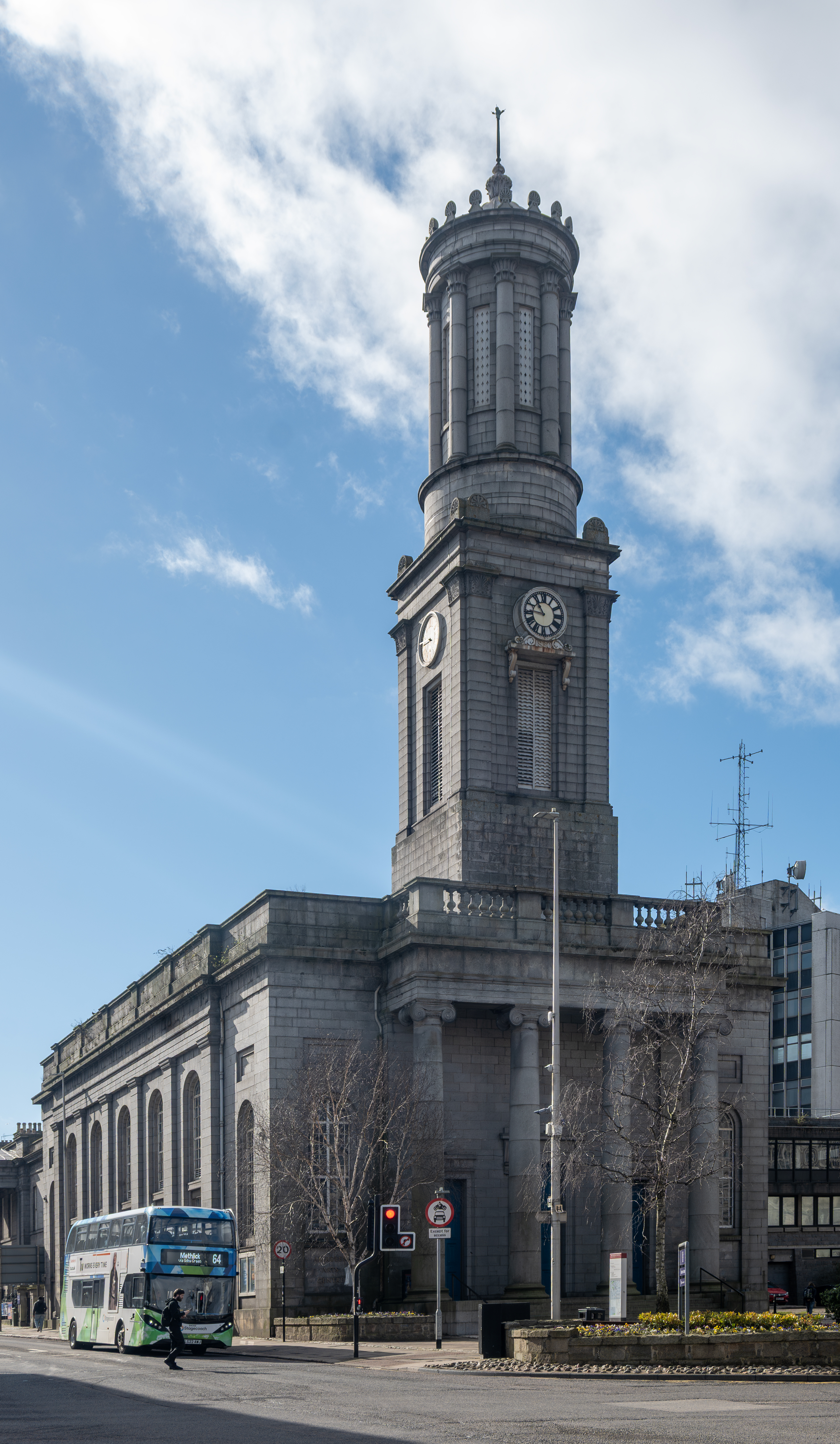
- Aberdeen Arts Centre building
- Interactive map of the Aberdeen Arts Centre area

General information
- Type: Arts Centre
- Location: 33 King Street, Aberdeen, AB24 5AA, Aberdeen, Scotland
- Coordinates: 57.1495°N 2.0941°W
- Opened: 1963

Other information
- Seating capacity: 350

Website
- http://www.aberdeenartscentre.com/

Listed Building – Category A
- Official name: Aberdeen Arts Centre
- Designated: 12 January 1967
- Reference no.: LB19946

Aberdeen Arts Centre is a theatre and arts centre on King Street in Aberdeen, Scotland with a 350-seater auditorium. It is a Category A listed building.

The building was originally the North Parish Church. The church was converted to an Arts Centre in 1963. By December of that year the Attic Theatre Company were presenting McWhittington, a pantomime over Christmas and New Year.

As a successor to previous groups such as Aberdeen Children's Theatre established by Catherine Hollingworth, and ACT Aberdeen, Castlegate Arts Limited which operates Aberdeen Arts Centre has charitable status. The centre is a community-focused arts venue, which aims to provide facilities and opportunities for individuals of all ages, backgrounds and abilities to engage in the performing arts.

The theatre is on two levels, with an upper and a lower gallery for audiences. There is a small orchestra pit and behind the stage there are dressing and rehearsal rooms for the shows and other projects such as local drama groups.

In addition the theatre has a large participatory arts programme. The centre is home to Castlegate Theatre Company (formally established by Annie Inglis), a youth group for teenagers which focuses on devised theatre. It hosts classes for writers and illustrators, Drama classes, led by Sheena Blackhall, Julie Hutton and Barry Donaldson. It hosts touring drama and musical productions and the annual Granite Noir crime writing festival. In addition Aberdeen Arts Centre puts on a summer festival known in Aberdeen as 'The Arts Carnival'.

The building also houses an exhibition area which hosts local and visiting art shows. Since 2007 it has hosted an artist in residence programme at the arts centre. The first artist was Will Teather.

== Fight to save Aberdeen Arts Centre ==
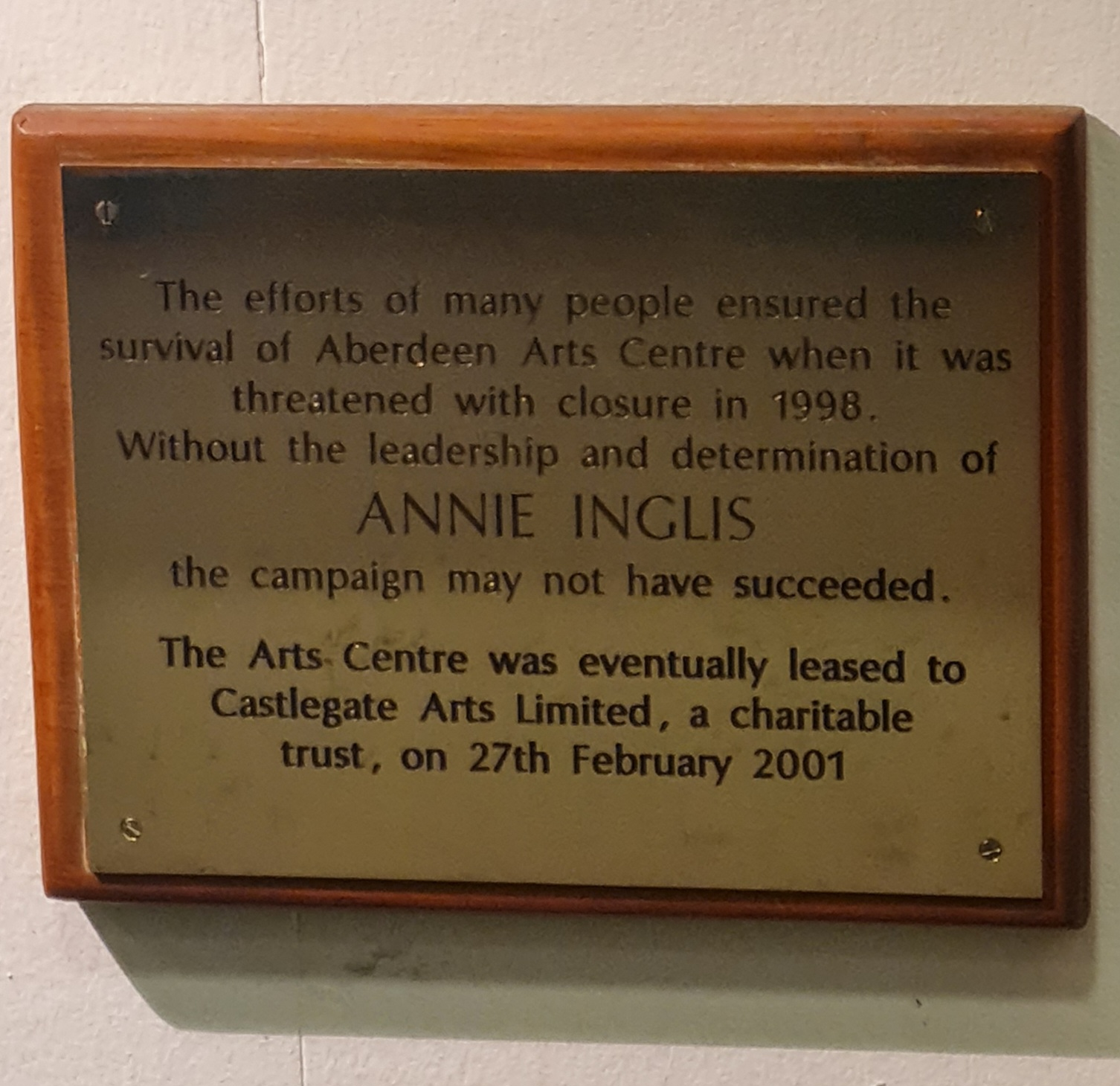
Commemorative plaque for Annie Inglis at Aberdeen Arts Centre

A successful campaign was led by Annie Inglis to save the Aberdeen Arts Centre from closure in 1998. Aberdeen City Council, as part of a bid to save £17.5m from its annual budget, had decided to cut funding for the centre to save £167,000 annually. In March 1998, while recovering in hospital from an asthma attack, Annie had coordinated a 14,500-signature petition to save the centre. This was presented, wrapped in red ribbon to Aberdeen City Council leader, Margaret Smith.

By June 1998 it was announced that an agreement had been reached between the city council and campaigners who were given until September to form a limited company and to sign a lease with the council as landlords. This was then extended by 10 weeks to allow them to meet a fundraising target of £60,000. Castlegate Arts Limited was set up on 25 January 1999. This is a volunteer led charity which continues to run the centre.
