= Annie Inglis =

Scottish drama teacher (1922 – 2010)

Annie Inglis MBE
- Born: Annie Nicol; 1922; Coatbridge, Scotland
- Died: 2010 (aged 87–88); Aberdeen
- Known for: Drama education

Annie Inglis MBE (1922 – 2010) was a Scottish drama teacher, known as Aberdeen's first lady of drama. She taught drama at Aberdeen's Northern College of Education. She founded the Attic Theatre and helped save the Aberdeen Arts Centre from closure in 1998.

== Early life ==
Annie Henderson Inglis was born Annie Nicol in 1922 in Coatbridge, Lanarkshire. She attended University of Glasgow, starting at age 16, where she studied English.

== Career ==
She started her teaching in Lanarkshire primary schools and gave private lessons in speech and drama. As a child her mother had taken her to a speech and drama therapist which resulted in her lisp being cured and resulted in her lifelong passion for drama. She started working in theatre in the 1940s at Monklands Rep. Annie moved to Aberdeen in 1953, starting her working life there as a teacher of phonetics. She later became a drama lecturer at Aberdeen College of Education, which is also known as Northern College.

Annie founded the Attic Theatre in Aberdeen in the late 1950s. Attic Theatre is an amateur group that mainly performed at Aberdeen Arts Centre and His Majesty's Theatre. Annie directed plays in the Aberdeen area and did drama workshops for local groups.

She was a founder in 1970 of the Association of Arts Centres of Scotland and its first head. In December 1970 she arranged with actor David Kossoff, who was playing Scrooge in an adaptation of A Christmas Carol at His Majesty's Theatre, not only to give a reading of bible stories at the Arts Centre, but to announce each night that he was doing so from the HMT stage.

She was a member of Grampian Regional Council's Arts Advisory Group in 1981.

In 1985 she founded a Theatre School in Aberdeen, based in the Arts Centre. From 1988 it was named after the Texaco oil company and benefitted by 1990 from their annual £6,000 sponsorship. It offered "an intensive, four week course to people between the ages of seven and 20, giving them opportunities to rehearse and perform a show, and learn all the skills involved in dramatic productions."

In 1996 Annie read a poem at the funeral of broadcaster Kennedy Thomson, who had been involved locally in the dramatic arts.

Annie started writing books at the age of 83. Her first book was called The Adventures Of Hannah And The Garden Gate.

== Campaign to save Aberdeen Arts Centre ==
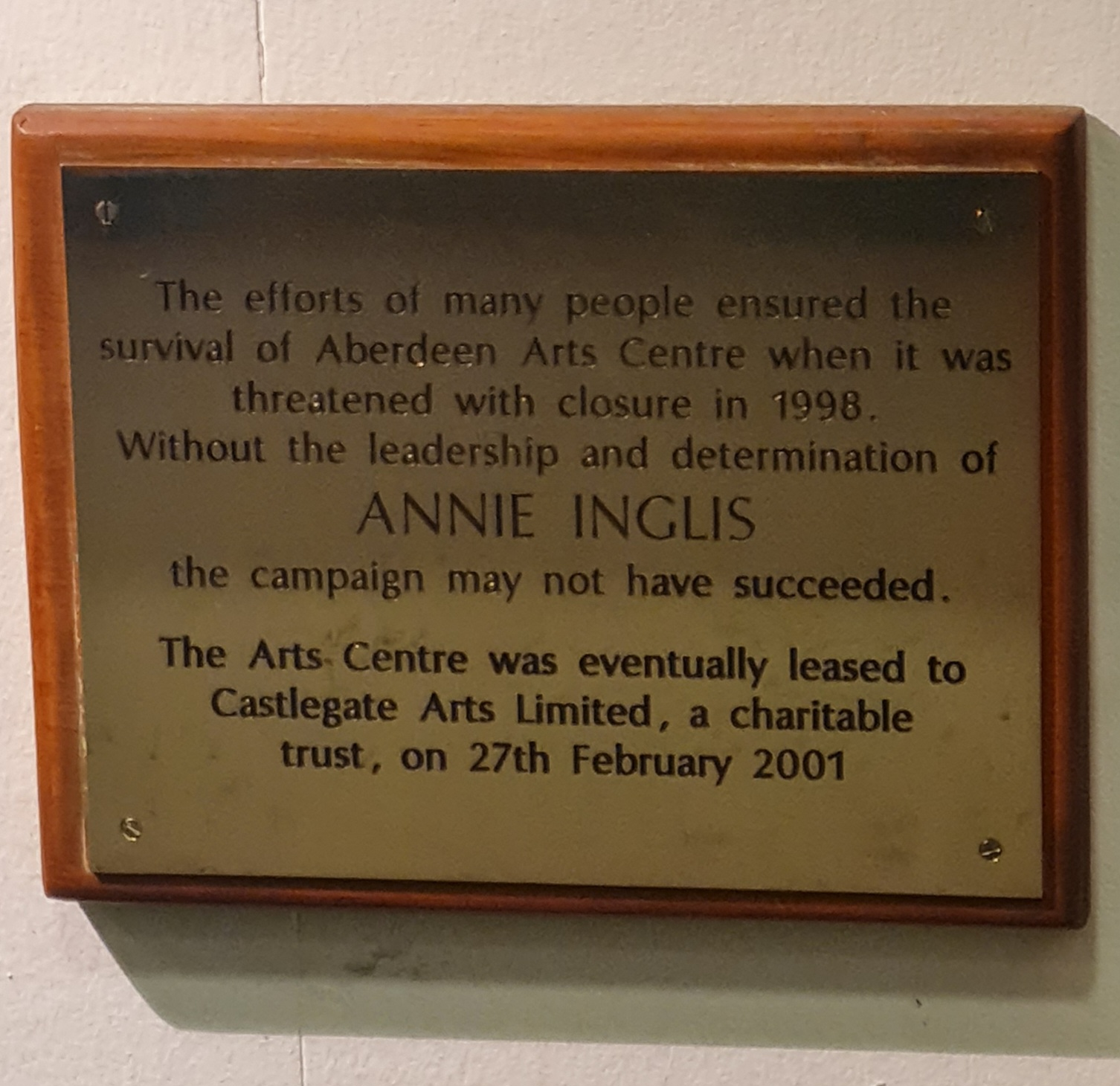
Commemorative plaque for Annie Inglis at Aberdeen Arts Centre

Annie led the successful campaign to save the Aberdeen Arts Centre from closure in 1998. Aberdeen City Council, as part of a bid to save £17.5m from its annual budget, had decided to cut funding for the centre to save £167,000 annually. In March 1998, while recovering in hospital from an asthma attack, she had coordinated a 14,500-signature petition to save the centre. This was presented, wrapped in red ribbon to Aberdeen City Council leader, Margaret Smith. She had previously been hospitalised with a 'mild heart attack' in 1988.

By June 1998 it was announced that an agreement had been reached between the city council and campaigners who were given until September to form a limited company and to sign a lease with the council as landlords. This was then extended by 10 weeks to allow them to meet a fundraising target of £60,000. Castlegate Arts Limited was set up on 25 January 1999. Annie was a director from its inception until she stepped down on 25 May 2009.

== Awards and honours ==
In 1989 Annie was recognised for her contribution to education in her adopted city in the Women of the Year awards organised by Aberdeen City Council. She was then back working as a relief teacher at St Machar Academy.

She was awarded an MBE in 2007 for her services to drama. After her death, a memorial bench was placed in the Cruickshank Gardens in Old Aberdeen. A plaque commemorating the fight to save the Arts Centre and recognising the role played by Annie in leading the campaign was installed in the foyer of the Aberdeen Arts Centre. It reads " ... Without the leadership and determination of Annie Inglis the campaign may not have succeeded...."

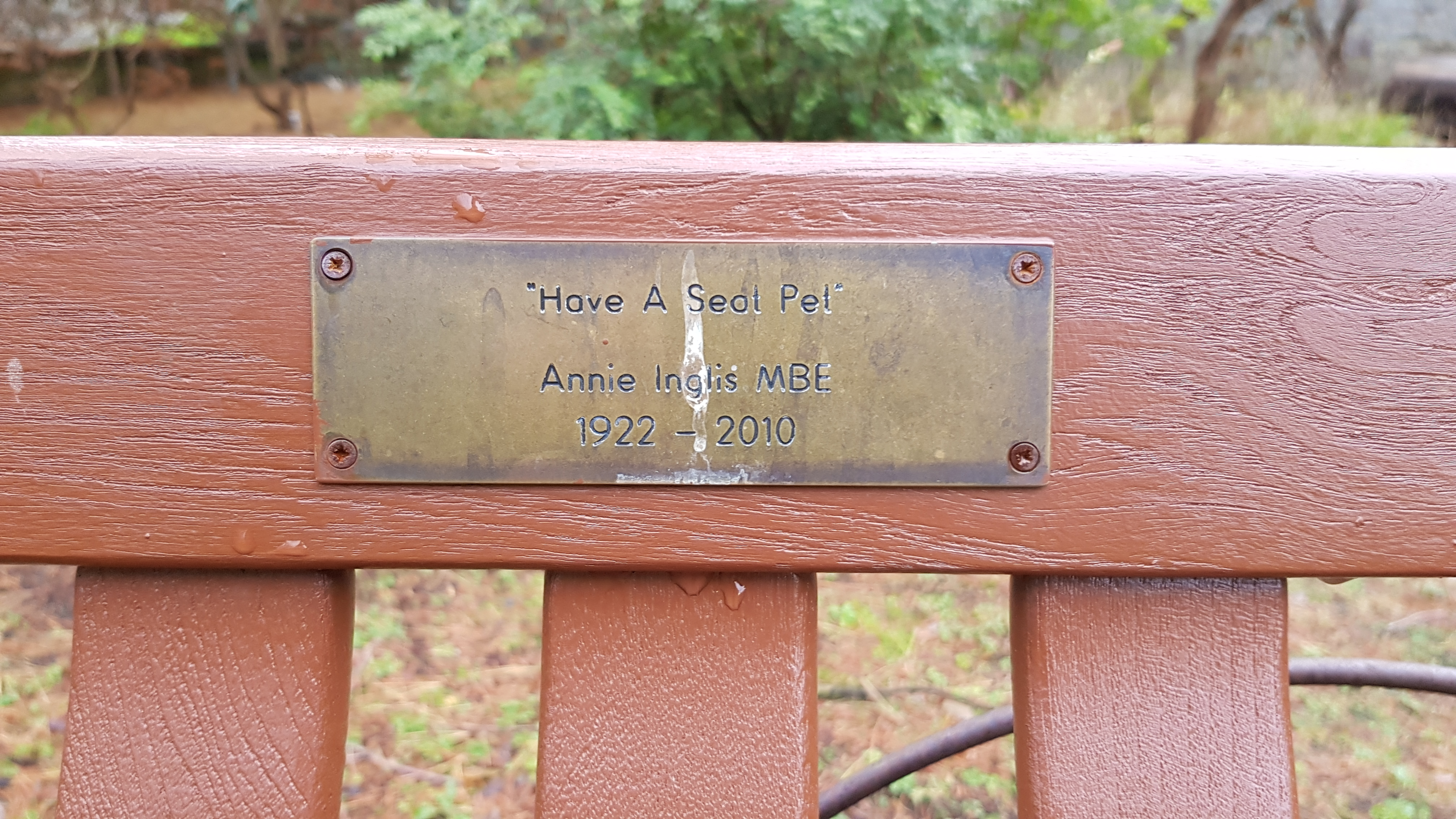
Commemorative bench to Annie Inglis in the Cruickshank Gardens, Aberdeen
