= Aberdeen Student Show =

Scottish musical and theatrical show

- Genre: Musical Comedy or Revue
- Show type: Annual student charity
- Location: Aberdeen, Scotland

Creative team
- Various: Changes annually
- Years Active: 1921 - Present Day

Aberdeen Student Show is a comedy musical and theatrical show, staged annually in Aberdeen, Scotland.

The Student Show has been held every year since 1921 (with the exception of 2020 due to the COVID-19 pandemic). From the start it has involved a number of young writers, performers and musicians. The show is staged in Aberdeen largest professional theatre, His Majesty’s Theatre.

The Student Show is coordinated by its Administrator’s Team and performed by students of The University of Aberdeen, Robert Gordon University and North East Scotland College. It is generally written and produced by former students and show alumni.

== Productions ==
| Year | Title | Director | Script Editor | Musical Director | Choreographer | Administrator | Total Raised | Number of Show | |
|---|---|---|---|---|---|---|---|---|---|
| 1921 | Mock Trial | | | | | | | 001 | |
| 1922 | Stella, The Bajanella | Eric Linklater | | J. S. Taylor / R. F. G. McCallum | | | | 002 | |
| 1923 | Rosemount Nights | Eric Linklater | | J. S. Taylor | | | | 003 | |
| 1924 | The Prince Appears | George Rowntree Harvey | Eric Linklater / Archie Hislop | | | | | 004 | |
| 1925 | One Exciting Knight | George Rowntree Harvey | David Landsborough Thomson | R. F. G. McCallum | | | | 005 | |
| 1926 | The Witching Hour | A. M. Shinnie | David Landsborough Thomson | R. F. G. McCallum | | | | 006 | |
| 1927 | Northern Lights | R. A. Wilson | | William Harkins | Isabel Murray | | | 007 | |
| 1928a | Admirable Crichton | | | | | | | 008 | |
| 1928b | Northern Lights | '3 Just Men' | | William Harkins/Vernon Eddie | Frances Forrest | | | 009 | |
| 1929 | Northern Lights | D. Hunter Munro | | William Harkins | Frances Forrest | | | 010 | |
| 1930 | Northern Lights | William Norrie | | Maurice D. Wright | Frances Forrest | | | 011 | |
| 1931 | Northern Lights | Douglas S. Raitt | | V. J. Eddie | Jimmy Allardyce | | | 012 | |
| 1932 | Aurora Borealis | Moultrie R. Kelsall | | Agnes Mathieson / William Thomson | Jimmy Allardyce | | | 013 | |
| 1933 | Town and Gown | Douglas S. Raitt | | Irvine S. Cooper | Irene C. Johnstone | | | 014 | |
| 1934a | The Spice of Life | Douglas S. Raitt / William Norrie | | | The Hendry School of Dancing | | | 015 | |
| 1934b | Town and Gown | Douglas S. Raitt | | Irvine S. Cooper | | | | 016 | |
| 1935 | Caravanella | Martin Gray / Stephen Mitchell | G. Rowntree Harvey | Lambert Wilson | Jeannie Hendry/Edith Kirkham | | | 017 | |
| 1936a | Spic and Span | James F. Mackay | | | The Hendry School of Dancing | | | 018 | |
| 1936b | Out For The Count | James F. Mackay | | James R. Ross | Jeannie Hendry/Edith Kirkham | | | 019 | |
| 1937 | That's What You Think | Adrian Stephen | | Lambert Wilson | Jeannie Hendry/Edith Kirkham | | | 020 | |
| 1938 | Beating Time | Douglas S. Raitt | | Alastair D. MacDonald | The Hendry School of Dancing | | | 021 | |
| 1939 | The 'Varsity Spirit | Douglas S. Raitt | | | | | | 022 | |
| 1940 | Watch Your Step | George E. Swinney / A.R. Taylor | | | | | | 023 | |
| 1941 | Hold That Smile | A. M. Shinnie | | Lambert Wilson | Polly Bundy | | | 024 | |
| 1942 | Neck or Nothing | Fred W. Pirie | Vincent Park | Alexander Nicol | The B. Stuart-Johnstone School of Dancing & Physical Culture | | | 025 | |
| 1943 | Nuts in April | Mrs Stephen ("Pollie") Bundy | Vincent Park | Addie Davidson | | | | 026 | |
| 1944 | Marischal Moments | A. Hay Prestowe / Thomas Forbes | | Lambert Wilson | | | | 027 | |
| 1945 | Q For Laughter | Thomas Forbes | | Alexander Nicol | The Hendry School of Dancing | | | 028 | |
| 1946 | To Meet The Macgregors | Thomas Forbes | Eric Linklater | Irvine S. Cooper | | | | 029 | |
| 1947 | Cakes and Ale | Vincent Park | | Addie Davidson | Eileen Ewen (later Howie) | | | 030 | |
| 1948 | Hooray for What | Vincent Park | | Sandy Leckie | Eileen Ewen (later Howie) | | | 031 | |
| 1949 | Hitting Back | A. M. Shinnie | | | Eileen Ewen (later Howie) | | | 032 | |
| 1950 | Passing Fancy | Thomas Forbes | Bertram W. Symes | Lambert Wilson | Eileen Ewen (later Howie) | | | 033 | |
| 1951 | Spring in Your Step | Thomas Forbes | Colin MacLean | Lambert Wilson | Eileen Ewen (later Howie) | | | 034 | |
| 1952 | Easter Fare | Thomas Forbes | | Alexander J. Gray / Lambert Wilson | Eileen Ewen (later Howie) | | | 035 | |
| 1953 | Pick O' The Pack | Thomas Forbes | | Reginald Barrett-Ayres | Eileen Ewen (later Howie) | | | 036 | |
| 1954 | Laughing At Life | Thomas Forbes | | | Eileen Ewen (later Howie) | | | 037 | |
| 1955 | Out Of This World | Reginald Barrett-Ayres | | Reginald Barrett-Ayres | Eileen Ewen (later Howie) | | | 038 | |
| 1956 | Here's To Tomorrow | Reginald Barrett-Ayres | | John Cheyne | Eileen Ewen (later Howie) | | | 039 | |
| 1957 | College Bounds | Reginald Barrett-Ayres / Bill Ramsay | | Philip J. Lord | Eileen Ewen (later Howie) | | | 040 | |
| 1958 | April Showers | Reginald Barrett-Ayres / Bill Ramsay | William (Buff) Hardie | Philip J. Lord | Jean Birse | | | 041 | |
| 1959 | Alma Mania | George Low | | Robert Howie | Jean Birse | | | 042 | |
| 1960 | Folies Berserques | George Low | | Ian Kemp | Jean Birse | | | 043 | |
| 1961 | Rage of King's | Reginald Barrett-Ayres | | James Macloy | Jean Birse | | | 044 | |
| 1962 | No Laughing Matter | Reginald Barrett-Ayres | | Rob Leys | Jean Birse | | | 045 | |
| 1963 | What A Life | Reginald Barrett-Ayres | Ian Middler | James McCloy | Jean Birse | | | 046 | |
| 1963 | Element of Surprise | Reginald Barrett-Ayres | Buff Hardie / Stephen Robertson | Phillip Lord / George Donald | Jean Birse | | | 047 | |
| 1964 | Feel Free | Reginald Barrett-Ayres | | | | | | 048 | |
| 1965 | This Is It | Reginald Barrett-Ayres | | | | | | 049 | |
| 1966 | One Degree Over | James Logan | | | | | | 050 | |
| 1967 | Jest A Minute! | Harry Hill | Ian Middler | Eric Gross | Judy Gibb | | | 051 | |
| 1968 | Running Riot | James Logan | Buff Hardie / Stephen Robertson | John Bell / George Donald | Heather Fowie | | | 052 | |
| 1969 | Kings and Quines | Alan Nicol | | John Kelsall / Alfie Tough | Marion Cobban / Helen Maclennan | | | 053 | |
| 1970 | Half C's Over | Alan Nicol | | Alfie Tough | Sheena Hall | | | 054 | |
| 1971 | 71 Proof | Alan Nicol | | Jim Addison | Avril McDonald | | | 055 | |
| 1972 | 72 Revue | James Logan | Tom Hutton / Ed Webster | Graham Reid | Valerie Wilson | | | 056 | |
| 1973 | Fit's At! | James Logan | | Jim Addison | Valerie Wilson | | | 057 | |
| 1974 | Fit Next! | Roddy Begg | Bob Irvine | Will Michael | Pat Thorpe | | | 058 | |
| 1975 | Fit Like | James Scotland | | Will Michael | | | | 059 | |
| 1976 | A Just in Time | Paul Cowan | Eric Crockart | Jenny Brown | Aileen Angus | | | 060 | |
| 1977 | Royal Flush | Charles Barron | Eric Crockart | Ian Maxwell | Aileen Angus | | | 061 | |
| 1978 | Stage Fright | Charles Barron | Eric Crockart | Ian Maxwell | Rhona Mitchell | | | 062 | |
| 1979 | Strike It Rich! | Roddy Begg | Eric Crockart | Ian Maxwell | Rhona Mitchell | | | 063 | |
| 1980 | Risques Galore | Joyce Wilson | Rod MacFarquhar | Ewen Ritchie | Rosalind Erwin | | | 064 | |
| 1981 | Sugar and Spice | Rhona Mitchell | Gary Simpson | Alan King | Rhona Mitchell | | | 065 | |
| 1982 | Fit's On? | Sandra Rennie | Gary Simpson | Alan King | Laurie Burns | | | 066 | |
| 1983 | Home Run | Roddy Begg | | Kay Henderson | Pauline Brooks | | | 067 | |
| 1984 | Up The Poll | Angie Walker (Campbell) | | Ken Hutchison | Anne Maryse-Churchill | | | 068 | |
| 1985 | Winning Streak | Angie Walker (Campbell) | | Ken Hutchison / Ken Hossick | Tina Moore | | | 069 | |
| 1986 | A Coarse Line | Ronnie Middleton | Linda Brett | Ken Hossick / Gordon Mundie | Fiona Lamont | | | 070 | |
| 1987 | The Provost Of Oz | Sarah Stankler | Linda Brett | Ken Hossick | Karen Berry | | | 071 | |
| 1988 | A Trivial Pursuit | Ronnie Middleton | Linda Brett | Mike Urquhart | Karen Berry | | | 072 | |
| 1989 | Fresh Heir | Ronnie Middleton | Pete Cram | Ken Hossick | Karen Berry | | | 073 | |
| 1990 | Mounthooly The Magic Roundabout | Ronnie Middleton | Pete Cram | Ewen Ritchie | Jane Harvey | | | 074 | |
| 1991 | N.E. Man and The Burgers Of Doom | Janet Adams | Fiona Walker | Roy Fraser | Laura Pike (later Jarret)/ Sharon Gill | | | 075 | |
| 1992 | Boomtown | Janet Adams | Alan D. Duncan / John Hardie | Roy Fraser | Laura Pike (later Jarret) | | | 076 | |
| 1993 | Woodside Storey | Pete Cram | John Hardie | Gavin Spencer | Laura Pike (later Jarret) | Scott Shearer | | | 077 |
| 1994 | Alas Poor Doric | Laura Pike (later Jarret) / John Hardie | Greg Gordon | Clare Cordiner | Laura Pike (later Jarret) | Joanna Taylor | | | 078 |
| 1995 | The Sound of Mastrick | John Hardie | Andrew Brebner | Clare Cordiner / Sandy Nicol | Joyce Forrest | Sally Taylor | | | 079 |
| 1996 | The Good, The Bad and The Buttery | John Hardie | Andrew Brebner | Sandy Nicol / Graham Read | Joyce Forrest | Judith Barron | | | 080 |
| 1997 | Scaffie Society | John Hardie | Andrew Brebner | Graham Read | Joyce Forrest | Moray Barber | | 081 | |
| 1998 | From Rubislaw With Love | Janet Adams | Andrew Brebner | Luke McCullough | Gabrielle Miles | Craig Pike | | 082 | |
| 1999 | A Tale of Two Fitties | Janet Adams | Andrew Brebner | Luke McCullough | Gabrielle Miles | Jill Stephenson | | 083 | |
| 2000 | Butch Cassie-End and The Sunnybank Kid | Craig Pike | Simon Fogiel | Shirley Cummings (later Torrie) / Lindsey Masson | Laura Lamb | Catriona Webster | | | 084 |
| 2001 | The Codfaither | Craig Pike | Simon Fogiel | Shirley Cummings (later Torrie) / Steven Rance | Laura Lamb | Emma Sharpe | | | 085 |
| 2002 | A Midstocket Night's Scream | David Lamb | Simon Fogiel | Steven Rance | Dawn Ramsay | Euan Fleming | | | 086 |
| 2003 | An American in Powis | Gayle Watt (later Hardie) | Greg Gordon | Graham Read / Steven Rance | Lesley Anderson | Ross Brechin | | | 087 |
| 2004 | Spook Who's Talking | Janet Adams / Craig Pike | Andrew Brebner / Simon Fogiel | Graham Read | Lesley Anderson | Claire Auton | | | 088 |
| 2005 | Fittie Woman | Lynsay Wilson | Moray Barber | Ben Torrie | Shona King | Craig Pike | | | 089 |
| 2006 | Yokel Hero | Simon Fogiel | Andrew Brebner | Ben Torrie / Claire Angus | Alison Scott / Shona King | Linsey Brack | | | 090 |
| 2007 | Invasion of the Doric Snatchers | Shirley Cummings (later Torrie) | Andrew Merson | Brian Gunnee | Shona King | Joanne Smith (later Peacock) | | | 091 |
| 2008 | Date Expectations | Lynne Cowie | Simon Fogiel | Steven Rance / Mairi Paton | Lindsay Bates | Kirsty Spicer | | | 092 |
| 2009 | Dial 'M' For Mastrick | Rebecca Gordon | Stuart King | Laura Jarret / Craig Pike | Shona King | Jonnie Milne | | | 093 |
| 2010 | Back To The Teuchter | Rebecca Gordon | Jonnie Milne | Anne Hingston / Iain Hingston | Colette Murray / Claire Chernouski | Siobhan Anthony | | | 094 |
| 2011 | Sleepless In Seaton | Ryan Peacock | Stuart King | Craig McDermott / Craig Pike | Rachel Bentley | Steven Dale | | | 095 |
| 2012 | Mary Torphins | Ryan Peacock | Garry Watson | Craig Pike / Craig McDermott | Shona King | | £57,969.00 | 096 | |
| 2013 | Spital Shop of Horrors | Michelle Bruce | Garry Watson | Craig McDermott | Sarah MacNay | Stephanie Longmuir | | £67,386.60 | 097 |
| 2014 | Wullie Wonkie and the Fine Piece Factory | Michelle Bruce | Shane Strachan | Craig McDermott | Sarah MacNay | Matthew Rose | | £80,000.00 | 098 |
| 2015 | Tilly Elliot | Dan Greavey | Garry Watson | Iain Hingston | Rosalind Watt | | £68,687.04 | 099 | |
| 2016 | Michty Mia! | Lynsey Cradock | Garry Watson | Craig McDermott | Hannah McKenzie | | £102,696.75 | 100 | |
| 2017 | Sister Echt | Craig Pike / Ryan Peacock / Joanne Peacock | Shane Strachan | Ewen Ritchie / Amanda Massie / Callum Massie | Sophie Hamilton Pike | Sarah Smith | | £96,194.15 | 101 |
| 2018 | Fittie Fittie Bang Bang | Craig Pike / Ryan Peacock / Joanne Peacock | | Matthew Rose | Sophie Hamilton Pike | Laura Green | | £86,233.62 | 102 |
| 2019 | The Glaikit Showman | Craig Pike / Ryan Peacock / Joanne Peacock | Garry Watson | Craig Pike / Rachel Watson / Ewen Ritchie | Sophie Hamilton-Pike / Sarah Smith | Lauren Walker | Lauren Walker | £122,000 | 103 |
| 2020 | (Planned show - Freezin - cancelled due to COVID-19 pandemic) | - | - | - | - | Becky Hossick | | xxx | |
| 2021 | Freezin - (performed in September 2021 due to COVID-19 pandemic restrictions earlier in year) | Craig Pike / Ryan Peacock / Joanne Peacock | Garry Watson | Rhona Smith | Sophie Hamilton-Pike / Sarah Smith | Becky Hossick / Amy Lamb | | £114,561.15 | 104 |
| 2022 | Dirty Danestone | Ali Corbett / Kyle Yeats | Michelle Bruce / Shane Strachan | Rhona Smith | Sarah Smith | Alex Brown | £103,014.87 | 105 | |
| 2023 | Ayetanic | Kyle Yeats / Sarah Dawson | Michelle Bruce / Shane Strachan | Matthew Rose / Rhianne Armstrong | Kyra Rostron / Stephen Summers | Katy Johnson | £125,059.26 | 106 | |
| 2024 | Mounthoolin' Rouge | Kenneth Lypka / Gavin Mckay | Alison Sandison / Dan Greavey | Becky Hossick | Sarah Smith | Meg Stanger | £156,323.96 | 107 | |
| 2025 | Seagully Blonde | Gavin McKay / Hannah Davidson | Alison Sandison / Dan Greavey | Kenneth Lypka | Sarah Smith | Sam Allan / Emmah Chibesakunda | TBD | 108 | |

== History ==
In 1920, at the prompting of the authorities at Aberdeen Royal Infirmary, the students' representative council (SRC) of Aberdeen University established a series of fund-raising events in aid of local hospitals; central to which was the annual Gala Week. In 1921 the Gala Week opened with the first Student Show, a mock trial (of a breach of promise case) held in the Aberdeen University Debating Chamber ("The Debater") at Marischal College. The Gala Week Committee then invited the University Debating Society to stage an annual musical comedy or revue based on student life. The first of these, in 1922, ‘Stella, the Bajanella’ was written by then undergraduate Eric Linklater with music by JS Taylor. The Show then became an annual event, performed in various venues in Aberdeen, including the Training Centre Hall in St. Andrew Street, the Aberdeen College Hall and the Palace Theatre in 1927 and 1928, before finding a home in His Majesty's Theatre in 1929. Since then it has occasionally been performed elsewhere in the city, when His Majesty's Theatre was unavailable – the Aberdeen College of Education in 1981 and 1982, the Music Hall in 2004 and His Majesty's Theatre – Hilton (the former College of Education theatre) in 2005.

The Student Show was produced every year in Aberdeen without a break from 1921, including throughout World War II, until 2020, when for the first time the show was cancelled, due to the COVID-19 pandemic.

The cast is made up of volunteer students. They intensively rehearse each new show during the Easter academic vacation. The following week - the first of the academic summer term - they perform the show, generally in the evenings, in front of paying audiences.

The 2019 Student Show, 'The Glaikit Showman' was staged at His Majesty's Theatre, raised £122,000 for 36 different local charities. Previous years had brought more modest returns.

== Notable alumni ==
Among those who were associated with the Student Show in its earlier years were Eric Linklater, Sonia Dresdel, Stephen Mitchell, Moultrie Kelsall, and Andrew Cruickshank. Participants from later in the 20th Century include playwright and educationalist James Scotland and members of The Flying Pigs.

== Notable directors ==
Novelist, historian and playwright, Eric Linklater (director 1922–24) wrote and directed the first Student Show proper; 'Stella, the Bajanella'. His play 'To Meet the Macgregors' was performed as the Student Show in 1946. This was during his tenure as Rector of Aberdeen University from 1945 to 1948.

Douglas S. Raitt (known as "Rab The Rhymer") (director 1931, 1933–34, 1938–39) was a marine biologist who worked in the Marine Laboratory in the Aberdeen district of Torry. He was also a popular radio performer, singing at the piano in broadcasts from the British Broadcasting Corporation (BBC) Aberdeen Studios. He died age 41 as a result of an accident with a car on 4 October 1944. The shows from 1935 to 1939 were musical comedies, mostly written by students under Raitt's direction. The 1933 show 'Town and Gown' was rewritten extensively and presented in its new form for a week in September 1934. This unusual timing for Student Show, during the university long vacation, was so as to coincide on 10 and 11 September 1934 with the third visit to Aberdeen of the British Association for the Advancement of Science.

Moultrie Kelsall, while head of the British Broadcasting Corporation's Aberdeen Radio Station, 2BD, produced 'Aurora Borealis' in 1932. Kelsall subsequently had a 30-year acting career in television and movies.

Reginald Barrett-Ayres (1920–1981), a graduate of Edinburgh University, was Director of Music at the Quaker Ackworth School near Pontefract, Yorkshire from 1942 to 45; and at Glasgow Academy from 1945 to 51. He joined Aberdeen University's Department of Music and Drama, as a Lecturer in January 1951. He became acting Head of Department in 1956 and remained in post (latterly, as Reader and Head of Department) until his death in a road accident at age 61. He was an expert on the music of Haydn, particularly the string quartets. His own compositions included three operas, concertos for violin and double bass, operettas, choral works, solos, duets, anthems and hymns. He was involved in many of the University's theatrical and musical productions, directing or co-directing an unsurpassed nine Student Shows between 1955 and 1965. With George Low he co-wrote the Show theme song "Spirit of Show". 'Laughing at Life', a show consisting of original music and arrangements, is listed as "c. 1961", but is likely to be the 1954 Student Show of the same title.

"A. Hay Prestowe" (co-director 1944) was the pseudonym of Andrew Shivas. While he was an undergraduate at Aberdeen he played in the university dance orchestra, was a tympanist for the university symphony orchestra, a pipe band big drummer, and student show xylophonist. He was also an accomplished conjurer, from which arose his pseudonym (a play on hey presto!), and co-founder, in 1925, of the Aberdeen Magical Society. A pathologist in later life in Edinburgh, Shivas died of a stroke in 1996.

Roddy Begg, director of the 1974, 1979 and 1983 Student Shows, and of the 2000 and 2005 reunions, has a lifelong interest in the theatre, acting and directing for Aberdeen's Studio Theatre Group (which he co-founded in the 1960s) and other dramatic and musical groups. He was Director of the Edinburgh Festival Fringe Society and Honorary Vice President of Aberdeen Opera Company. A graduate of the University of Aberdeen, he was a member of staff for over three decades, as Secretary to the Faculties of Medicine and Science, Registry Officer, Clerk to the Senate, and Secretary to the University. He retired as Secretary in 1999, taking up the post of Director of Alumni Relations. He retired from the University in February 2002. In November 2006 he was awarded the Degree of Doctor of Honoris Causa by Aberdeen University, in recognition of his lifelong commitment to the Institution.

Charles Barron (1936-2012) was Student Show director 1977–78 and reunion co-director 2005. He had a long and prolific tenure in the dramatic arts, Doric dialect and history of the Scottish North-East. He graduated from Aberdeen University with a First Class Honours Degree in English Language and Literature, taught in Aberdeen and Inverurie, where began a 40-year association with Haddo House, as Shakespearean actor, Director of Operas, Arts Director and creator of the Youth Theatre. In 1970, he became Head of Speech and Drama at Aberdeen College of Education (later the Northern College of Education, which eventually became subsumed within Aberdeen University). He was the award-winning author of the Doric plays ‘Fooshion’ and ‘Amang the Craws’.

Rhona Mitchell choreographed the 1978, 1979 and 1981 shows, and also directed in 1981. She has worked professionally on radio and stage and as a freelance voice coach, drama tutor and director for more than 25 years with Scottish Television, BBC Scotland and many theatres across Scotland. She founded the Mitchell School of Drama in Inverurie in 1983. She co-directed the Abderite Theatre Company, in which capacity she directed 'Gobi's Eyes' in 2004, and 'Ouch' in 2005. She also produced the first Garioch Theatre Festival in April 2005.

Ronnie Middleton, an Arts Graduate of Aberdeen University, mathematics teacher at Powis Academy and later Cults Academy, dancer, singer and multi-faceted actor, directed Student Show in 1986 and from 1988 to 90, co-directed the 2000 reunion and took part as cast member in many shows in the 1970s. Ronnie was a prolific performer and director with local theatre groups. He co-founded the Aberdeen Phoenix Theatre Company. He was also closely involved in the Attic Theatre Company, in Powis Academy stage productions, Temporary Fault and Punchline, until his death from cancer in 2002. Ronnie is also remembered for his secret, but well-known, fortnightly role at Pittodrie Stadium as Angus the Bull, Aberdeen Football Club's mascot.

== Other notable contributors ==
George Sinclair, formerly headmaster at Powis Academy, stage-managed 38 Student Shows from the 1950s, many of them with the assistance of Colin MacKenzie, who eventually succeeded him as stage manager of Show. During the same period George Sinclair also stage-managed 32 shows for the Aberdeen Lyric Musical Society.

Other notable contributors behind the scenes, as recollected by former Show set designer Edi Swan, include stage managers Bill McCann, Derek Nisbet, Sandy Youngson, John Webster and Gus Law; choreographers Eileen Ewen (1947–57) and Jean Birse; set designers Alex Young and Melvin Dalgarno; make-up artists George Grant and Sandy Dale; wardrobe mistresses Alice Sparke and Ena McLaughlan; and administrators Philip Ross, Robin McLeod, Bob Downie, John Bain, Alec Main and John Duffus.

The script editor for the 1951 Student Show 'Spring In Your Step' was Colin MacLean, who went on to be the founding editor, in 1965, of the Times Educational Supplement, Scotland, and from March 1979 to June 1990 was managing director (publishing) of Aberdeen University Press.

== Theme song ==
The 1922 theme song "Stella, the Bajanella", by R. F. G. McCallum and J. S. Taylor, became a popular anthem for many years. It was replaced in the 1950s by "Spirit of Show", written by George Low with music by Reginald Barrett-Ayres. "Spirit of Show" has since remained the traditional anthem of Student Show.

== Descendant comedy shows ==
"Scotland the What?". William "Buff" Hardie and Steve Robertson first met in the Student Show in 1952. George Donald, another University of Aberdeen student, wrote music for the 1954 Student Show, but did not take part in it. So all three only met together later through the Aberdeen Revue Group, which is where they also found their future producer Jimmy Logan. (He later had to revert in public to his formal first name "James" in order to join the actors' union Equity, because there was already a Glaswegian comic using the professional name Jimmy Logan.) Buff Hardie had first appeared in the 1951 Student Show 'Spring in Your Step', and co-wrote the 1957 show 'College Bounds'. But it was after the 1968 Show 'Running Riot' - which the four men wrote, composed, produced and directed - that the idea of putting on a show of their own at the Edinburgh Festival was first mooted. The on-stage trio of Hardie, Robertson and Donald first appeared under the banner of "Scotland the What?" at the Edinburgh Festival Fringe in 1969. Jimmy Logan, who directed the Student Show in 1966, 1968, 1972 and 1973, also directed "Scotland the What?" from 1969 until his death in 1993.

"The Flying Pigs". Student Show members Andrew Brebner, Scott Christie, Shirley Cummings, Greg Gordon, Oli Knox, John Hardie, Fiona Lussier and Craig Pike formed The Flying Pigs in 1997. Now with a line-up containing Moray Barber, Andrew Brebner, Elaine Clark, Greg Gordon, Susan Gordon, John Hardie, Craig Pike and Steve Rance, the group have performed twelve revues in Aberdeen, at the Aberdeen Arts Centre, Lemon Tree Studio Theatre, and His Majesty's Theatre; as well as recording a BBC Scotland Radio series (Desperate Fishwives). A BBC Scotland TV Pilot of the same name was broadcast on 14 December 2010. A production marking 20 years since their debut was staged at His Majesty's Theatre in June 2018.

== Titles ==
'Stella, the Bajanella' (1922) was apparently named for Stella Henriques, a medical student at Aberdeen University. Bajan, a medieval term (literally 'yellow beak' – bec jaune), describing trainees in the pre-student year, was traditionally applied to Aberdeen University freshmen. Female students were referred to as "bajanellas".

1928's 'Admirable Crichton' was a production of The Admirable Crichton, a comedy play written in 1902 by Scotsman J. M. Barrie, Rector of the University of St Andrews from 1919 to 1922. Barrie's older brother, Alexander, graduated with honours in Classics at Aberdeen University in 1866.

Several titles employ or make puns from local place names – 'Rosemount Nights' (1923); 'Mounthooly The Magic Roundabout' (1990), based on the city's iconic Mounthooly Roundabout; 'Woodside Storey' (1993), 'The Sound of Mastrick' (1995), 'From Rubislaw With Love' (1998) 'Butch Cassie-End and The SunnyBank Kid' (2000) [the Aberdeen district of Causewayend is pronounced "Cassie-end"], 'A Midstocket's Night Scream' (2002), 'An American in Powis' (2003), 'Dial 'M' For Mastrick' (2009), 'Mary Torphins' (2012), 'Spital Shop of Horrors' (2013), 'Tilly Elliot' (2015) [Tilly being shortened from Tillydrone] and 'Sister Echt' (2017). Three shows use the local pronunciation of Footdee – 'Fittie': 'A Tale of Two Fitties' (2000), 'Fittie Woman' (2005) and ‘Fittie Fittie Bang Bang’ (2018).

Many titles, traditionally, are puns and plays on other well-known theatrical titles, e.g. 'Folies Berserques' (1960) – Folies Bergère; 'Risques Galore' (1980) – Whisky Galore; 'A Coarse Line' (1986) – A Chorus Line; 'The Provost Of Oz' (1987) – The Wizard of Oz; 'Mounthooly The Magic Roundabout' (1990) – The Magic Roundabout; 'N.E. Man and The Burgers Of Doom' (1991) – Indiana Jones and the Temple of Doom; Woodside Storey (1993) – West Side Story; Alas Poor Doric (1994) – "alas poor Yorick!" from Hamlet; The Sound of Mastrick (1995) – The Sound of Music; 'The Good, The Bad and The Buttery' (1996) – The Good, the Bad and the Ugly. (Buttery is an Aberdeen breakfast roll); 'From Rubislaw With Love' (1998) – From Russia With Love; 'A Tale of Two Fitties' (1999) – A Tale of Two Cities; 'Butch Cassie-End and The SunnyBank Kid' (2000) – Butch Cassidy and the Sundance Kid; 'The Codfaither' (2001) – The Godfather; 'A Midstocket's Night Scream' (2002) – A Midsummer Night's Dream; 'An American in Powis' (2003) – An American in Paris; 'Spook Who's Talking' (2004) – Look Who's Talking; 'Fittie Woman' (2005), a spoof on Pretty Woman; 'Yokel Hero' (2006) – Local Hero; 'Invasion of the Doric Snatchers' (2007) – Invasion of the Body Snatchers; 'Date Expectations' (2008) – Great Expectations; also based on the Cilla Black TV show 'Blind Date'; 'Dial 'M' For Mastrick' (2009) – Dial M For Murder; 'Back To The Teuchter' (2010) – Back to the Future; 'Sleepless in Seaton' (2011) - Sleepless in Seattle; 'Mary Torphins' (2012) - Mary Poppins; 'Spital Shop of Horrors' (2013) - Little Shop of Horrors; ' Wullie Wonkie and the Fine Piece Factory' (2014) - Willy Wonka & the Chocolate Factory; 'Tilly Elliot' (2015) - Billy Elliot; 'Michty Mia!' (2016) - Mamma Mia!; 'Sister Echt' (2017) - Sister Act; ‘Fittie Fittie Bang Bang’ (2018) - Chitty Chitty Bang Bang; ‘The Galikit Showman’ (2019) - The Greatest Showman; ‘Freezin’ (2021) - Frozen; ‘Dirty Danestone’ (2022) - Dirty Dancing; ‘Ayetanic’ (2023) - Titanic.

== Reunions ==
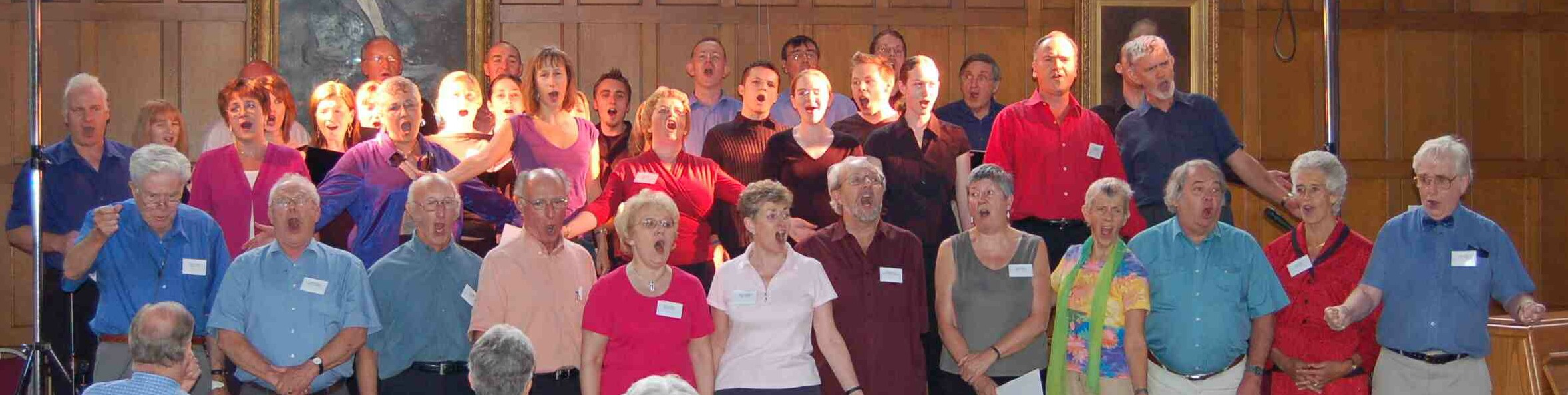
Former cast members at the 2005 reunion performing 'Spirit of Show'

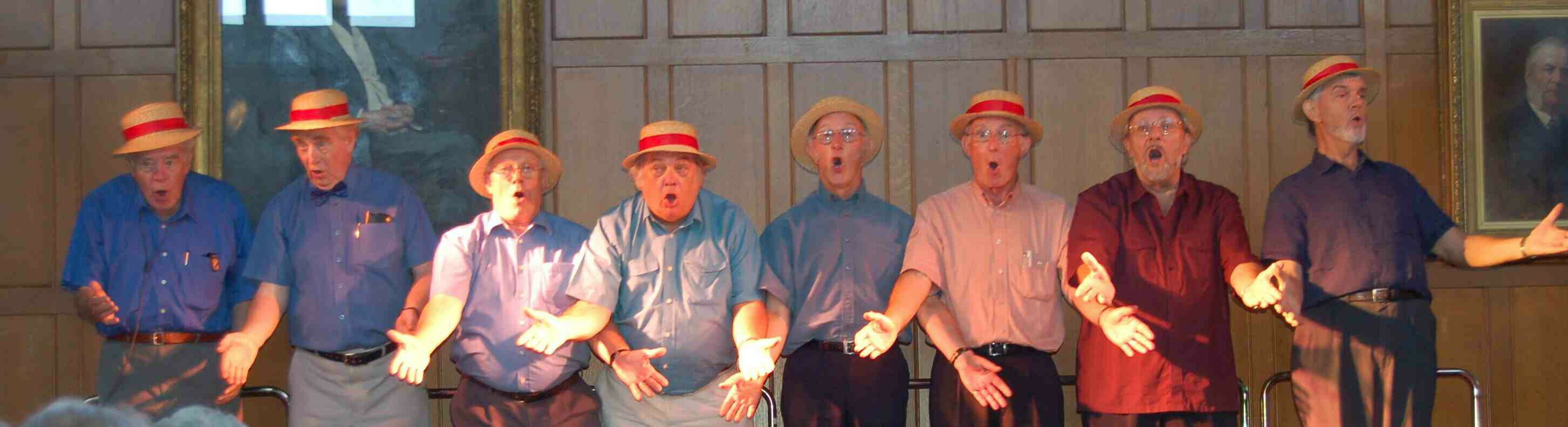
Former cast members reprise "The Octet" from 1949's show "Hitting Back"

Under the auspices of the Aberdeen University Alumnus Association, reunion cabarets (titled "Spirit Of The Show", honouring the Barrett-Ayres and Low composition) featuring former members from Student Shows as early as 1942 were held at the Aberdeen University Student Union in 1995 (coinciding with the University's Quincentennial); and at the University's Elphinstone Hall in 2000 and 2005. Approximately 250 former cast members attended each reunion, of whom about 70 re-enacted sketches and musical numbers from former shows. The oldest performer in the 2000 reunion was Duncan Murray, a retired doctor from Kent, who had appeared in the Show between 1942 and 1945. He sang "Rosemount Rosie", one of the most popular Student Show numbers of the 1940s.

The theatrical society were hosted by Lord Provost David Cameron and Aberdeen City Council with a Civic Reception in the cities Beach Ballroom. This took place in May 2022 and celebrated 100 years of the charitable student association. Notable show alumni including Amy lamb, Alex Brown and John Hardie of The Flying Pigs spoke at the event.
