= Neil Kemsley =

Scottish cricketer

Personal information
- Full name: Jeremy Neil Kemsley
- Born: 28 September 1933; Melbourne, Victoria, Australia
- Died: 16 February 2018 (aged 84); Guernsey
- Batting: Right-handed

Domestic team information
- Years: Team
- 1955–1957: Scotland

Career statistics
| Competition | First-class |
|---|---|
| Matches | 8 |
| Runs scored | 285 |
| Batting average | 20.35 |
| 100s/50s | 1/1 |
| Top score | 103 |
| Catches/stumpings | 2/– |
- Source: Cricinfo, 18 June 2022

Jeremy Neil Kemsley (28 September 1933 — 16 February 2018) was an Australian-born Scottish first-class cricketer and badminton player.

Kemsley was born at Melbourne in September 1933, but emigrated with his parents to Scotland as a child, where he was educated at Aberdeen Grammar School. Kemsley made his debut for Scotland in a first-class cricket match against Ireland at Dublin in 1955, with him making eight first-class appearances up to 1957. Kemsley scored 285 runs across these matches, at an average of 20.35; his highest score of 103 came against the Marylebone Cricket Club (MCC) at Aberdeen in 1957, with Kemsley having scored an unbeaten century against the MCC in a minor two-day match at Lord's the previous season. His club cricket was for both Clydesdale Cricket Club in Glasgow and Grange Cricket Club in Edinburgh. Besides playing cricket, Kemsley represented Scotland in badminton. By profession, he was an accountant. He later moved to the island of Guernsey, where he died in February 2018.
