= Aberdeen Grammar School =

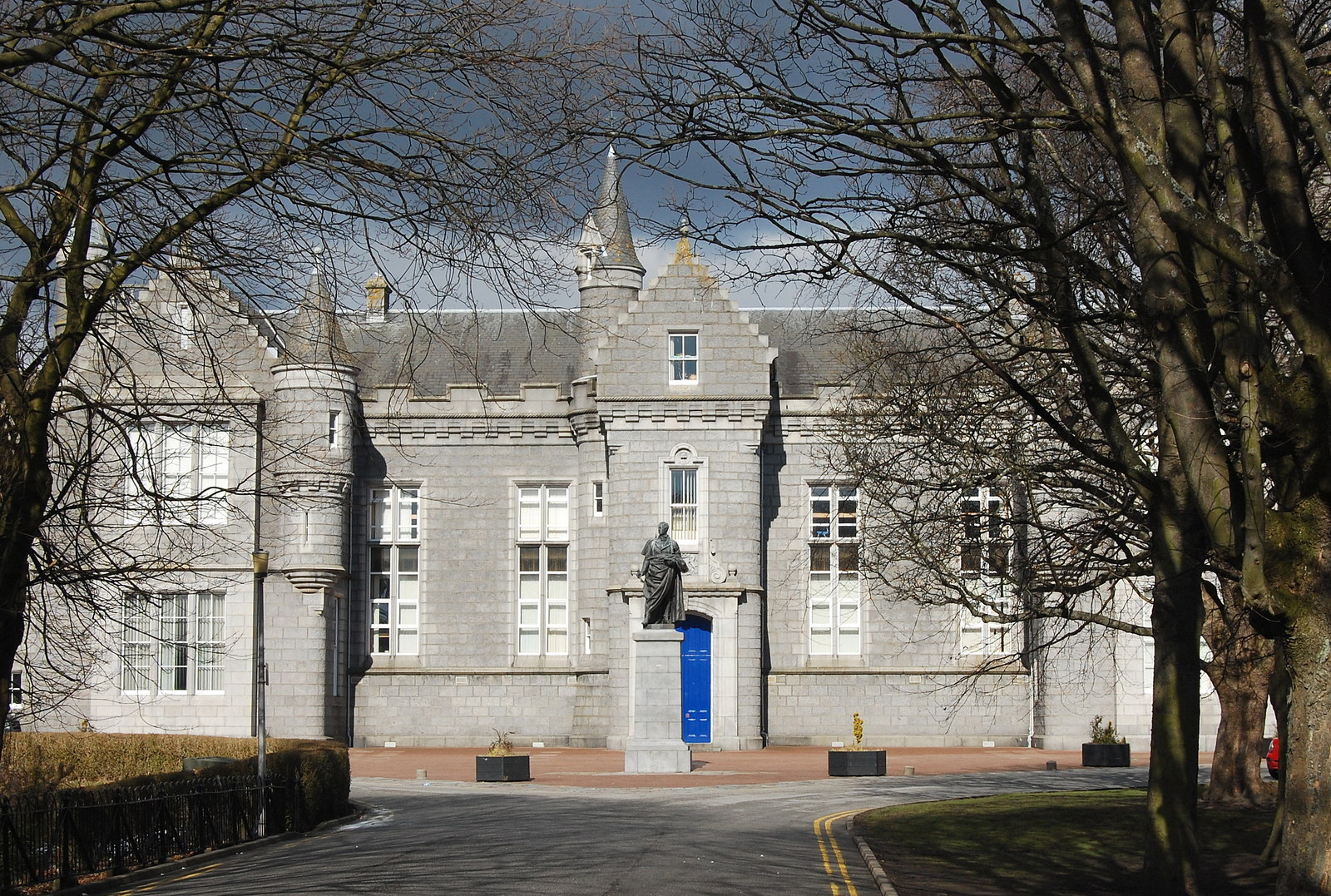

Location
- Skene Street; Aberdeen, AB10 1HT; Scotland; 57°08′49″N 2°06′54″W

Information
- Type: Secondary school
- Motto: Bon Record (Of good report)
- Established: c. 1256; 770 years ago
- Local authority: Aberdeen City Council
- Rector: Shirley Torrie (Acting) 2026 - present
- Staff: 98 (2024)
- Gender: Coeducational (all boys previously)
- Age: 11 to 18
- Enrolment: 1,306 (2024)
- Houses: Byron; Keith Dun; Melvin
- Colours: Blue, Red, White
- Website: Aberdeen Grammar School

Aberdeen Grammar School is a state secondary school in Aberdeen, Scotland. It is one of thirteen secondary schools run by the Aberdeen City Council educational department.

It is the oldest school in the city and one of the oldest schools in the United Kingdom, with a history spanning more than 750 years. Founded around 1256, the year used in official school records, it began operating as a boys' school. On Skene Street, near the centre of the city, it was originally situated on Schoolhill, near the current site of Robert Gordon's College. It moved to its current site in 1863, and became co-educational in 1973.

In 1970 the school's name was changed by the City of Aberdeen Education Committee to a more accurate, less ceremonial "Rubislaw Academy" but in 1977 the name was reverted to "Aberdeen Grammar School" by the Grampian Regional Council, who at that point were responsible for education in Aberdeen.

Although the school is named Aberdeen Grammar School, the school is not a grammar school. The state school does not choose its own students and instead has a catchment zone like other schools in Aberdeen, Scotland.

In an annual survey run by the British broadsheet newspaper The Times, Aberdeen Grammar was rated the 15th best Scottish state secondary school in 2019, and second in Aberdeen behind Cults Academy.

The most notable former student is Lord Byron, the Romantic poet and writer. He spent a short time at the school before he returned to England aged ten. A statue of him was erected in the front courtyard of the school. Alumni include Scottish international footballer Russell Anderson, mathematician Hector Munro Macdonald.

== History ==
=== Early history ===
The school coat of arms

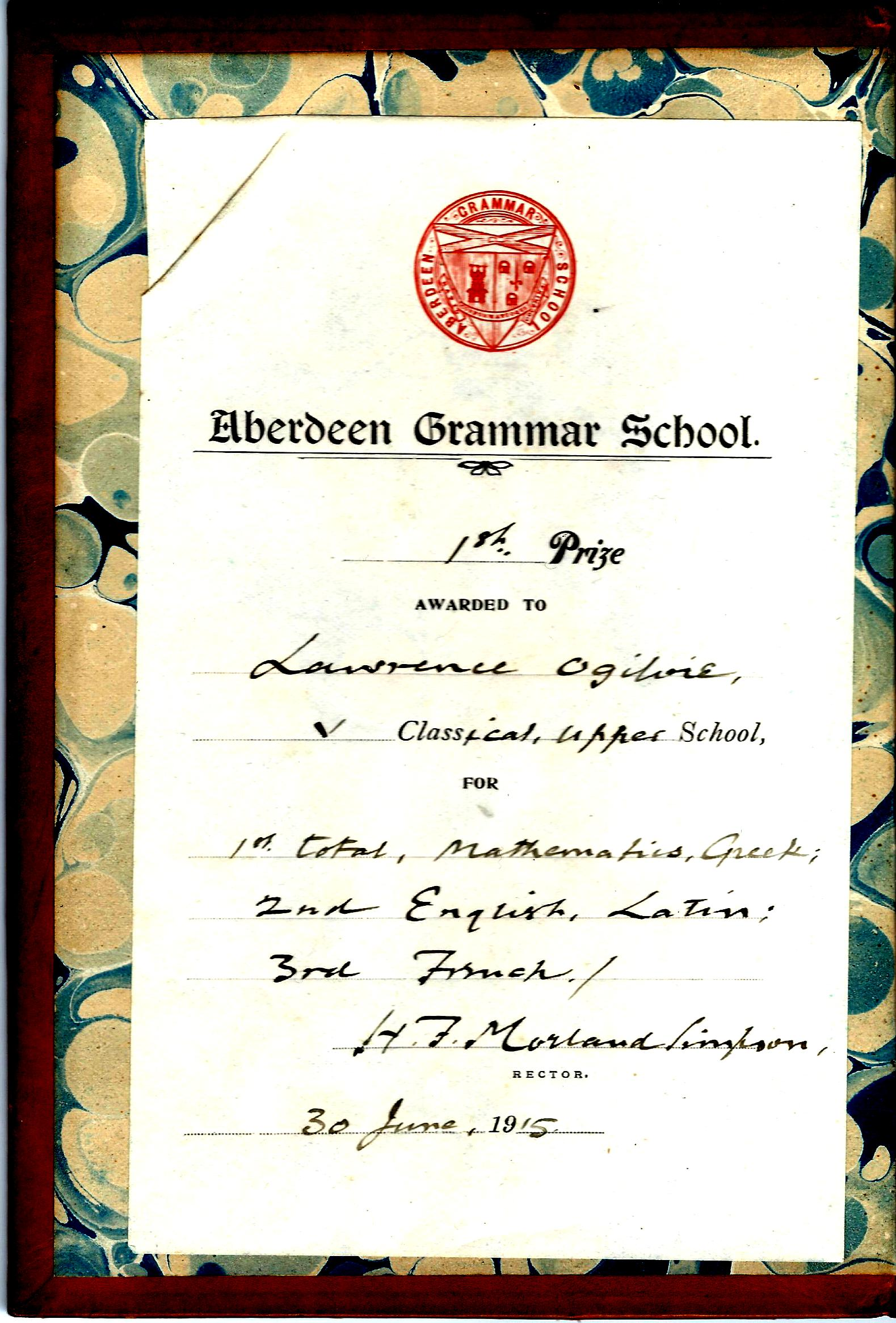
A certificate awarded to a pupil in 1915 for success in Maths, English, Greek, Latin, and French.

The exact date of the school's founding is unknown; however, research done to mark the school's 750th anniversary led to the belief it was formed in c. 1256, which is the date that is now used for official school purposes. The earliest documented date of its existence is in the Burgh Records of 1418, when the Lord Provost and Council nominated John Homyll to replace the recently deceased Andrew of Chivas as "Master of the Schools". Originally on Schoolhill, near the site of the current Robert Gordon's College, the curriculum consisted of Latin, Greek and ancient geography.

In 1580, new pupils were reprimanded, under the penalty of £10, if they did not show good behaviour or did not listen to their Magistrates or masters. In 1612, the pupils, many of whom were related to the gentry in the country, rioted with pistols and hagbuts, and took over part of the school. The masters stopped the riot, and 21 pupils were expelled, while some were arrested.

=== Recent history ===
In 1986, the original building was devastated by a fire, destroying most of the rooms including the large library, a collection of Byron's notebooks, the trophy room and other classrooms, although the historic facade was mostly undamaged.

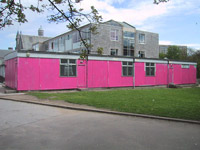
The modular building that was painted pink as part of a prank on "muck-up day" in 2002

The school and FPs club own the 18-acre (7.3 ha) Rubislaw Playing Fields at a site about a mile away from the main school building. Shared with the former pupils' club, the location has rugby union pitches with a stand, football pitches, grass hockey pitches and an artificial hockey pitch built in 2005.

In recent years the school has been the site of a number of newsworthy events, including a protest against PETA, the painting pink of an entire temporary classroom block, and a bomb threat.

The school marked its 750th anniversary year in 2007 with a series of fund-raising events, the proceeds of which went towards buying a new school minibus. Also in 2007, work was completed on a new gymnasium, begun two years previously.

In February 2019, the school was shut for a suspected gas leak.

== Present day ==
Today the school is run by Aberdeen City Council in accordance with the Scottish Executive's educational guidelines for state schools. In the 2013/14 academic year, the education of each pupil at the Grammar School specifically cost £4,252.

In the session 2018–2019, 61% of leavers received a qualification equivalent of five Highers or more. Furthermore, 83% gained 5 or more National 5s and 27% gained 2 or more Advanced Highers.

=== Pupils and catchment area ===
About 1100 pupils attend the school each year, between the ages of about 11 to 18. The school's catchment area centres on the west end of the city, including Rosemount and Mannofield. There are five main primary schools that feed into the school, located throughout the centre and west-end of Aberdeen: Ashley Road Primary School, Gilcomstoun Primary School, Mile-End School, Skene Square Primary School and St Joseph’s Primary School. Under the Parent's Charter, children from other areas can attend the school after successful application by parents. Places using this method are limited for each year.

As of 2023, of the schools in Scotland with the ten highest academic achievements, the school has the most inexpensive houses within its catchment zone.

== Rectors ==
The rector is the head of the school. Records show there were 26 rectors between 1418 and 1881.

== Notable alumni and teachers ==
- Russell Anderson, Scotland international footballer, captain of Aberdeen F.C.
- James Beattie, professor of moral philosophy and logic at the University of Aberdeen
- George Boyne, principal and vice-chancellor of the University of Aberdeen
- Lord Byron, poet, famous poems include Childe Harold's Pilgrimage and Don Juan; his statue stands in front of the school
- Zoey Clark, British athlete
- Craig Clunas, historian of Chinese art; Emeritus Professor of the History of Art, University of Oxford
- Robin Cook, former cabinet member and Secretary of State
- Martin Dalby, composer
- David Ferrier, FRS, neurologist and psychologist
- James Gibbs 18th century architect
- Paul Gough, Vice-Chancellor, Arts University Bournemouth, and Chair of UKADIA
- Iain Gray, chief executive, technology strategy board and former MD Airbus UK
- Neil Kemsley, sportsman (cricket and badminton)
- Robert Daniel Lawrence, early recipient of insulin injections, founder of the British Diabetic Association, now Diabetes_UK
- Eric Linklater, novelist, author of Magnus Merriman and Juan in America
- William Lumsden, cricketer and British Army officer
- Hector Munro Macdonald, Scottish mathematician and Fellow of the Royal Society in 1901, and Edinburgh in 1905; was awarded the Royal Society Royal Medal in 1916
- David Masson, Scottish writer
- James Melvin (1795–1853), Latin scholar and rector (1826–53)
- John Macleod (physiologist), recipient of the 1923 Nobel Prize for Physiology or Medicine
- John McLeod (composer)
- John Bryce McLeod Scottish mathematician and Fellow of the Royal Society of Edinburgh in 1974, Fellow of the Royal Society of London in 1992, awarded the Royal Society of Edinburgh Keith medal and prize in 1987, London Mathematical Society Naylor Prize and Lectureship in 2011
- Michael Sheard (1938-2005) Scottish character actor known for playing villains (including Mr Bronson in Grange Hill and Admiral Ozzel in The Empire Strikes Back)
- Steve Robertson of "Scotland the What?"
- John Smith (architect)
- William Smith (architect)
- Annie Wallace, actress
- David Wedderburn (teacher), wrote Vocabula in 1636
- John David Maitland Wright (1942-2023), research professor of mathematics at the University of Aberdeen, professor of mathematics at the University of Reading and Fellow of the Royal Society of Edinburgh in 1978

== See also ==
- List of the oldest schools in the United Kingdom
