= Word – University of Aberdeen writers festival =

Book festival at University of Aberdeen

Word – University of Aberdeen writers festival was a book festival that took place from 1999 until 2011, initially every two years and latterly every year, over a weekend of May at the University of Aberdeen. Authors, thinkers and commentators from all over the world came each year to Aberdeen for a three-day celebration of the written word with a mix of readings, discussions, films and exhibitions. There was also a Schools' and Children's festival.

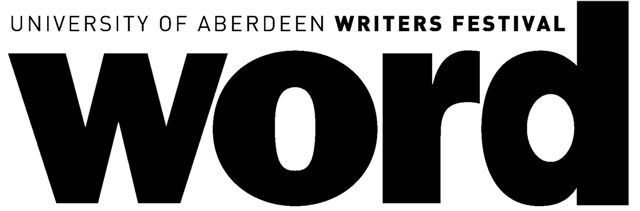
Logo of the Word - University of Aberdeen Writers Festival

== History ==
The University of Aberdeen writers festival originally took place in May 1999 with a £1,000 grant from the Scottish Arts Council and was "the largest, and most impressive literary event ever held in Aberdeen" according to The Scotsman. The second edition was in 2001, and the festival grew from this date. In 2009, Word attracted more than 10,000 visitors. Attendance at the 2010 Festival was in excess of 11,000, with a year of record ticket sales for a weekend of various events – readings, debates, music, exhibits, workshops and film screenings from more than 100 authors, poets, musicians, actors, artists, thinkers and media personalities. The 2010 programme was the most international yet, with Mayan poetry from Guatemala (translated into Scots), one of Poland's leading novelists, memoires of Sierra Leone, and an annual event on Spanish writing. The international focus was juxtaposed against an equally strong Scottish line-up, including a tribute to the north-east Doric storyteller Stanley Robertson, a series of Tartan Noir events, a debate on the state of the Scottish nation, a Gaelic book launch and children's storytelling sessions in Gaelic and Doric.

== Programme ==
Names appearing at the Festival included Nobel laureate Alasdair Gray, Alexander McCall Smith, Louis de Bernières, Seamus Heaney, Ian Rankin, Poet Laureate Carol Ann Duffy, Lionel Shriver, and Irvine Welsh, as well as a packed series of events for young readers. 2010 marked the 10th Word Festival and as part of the celebrations to mark the anniversary Scottish Opera’s Five:15 strand, featuring five new 15-minute operas by Scottish composers and librettists, premiered for the first time in Aberdeen.

== Venue ==
The University of Aberdeen writers festival was held at the King's College Conference Centre, a set of marquees, and other university venues on the campus in Old Aberdeen. Some events were held in venues across Aberdeen City and Shire.

== Official website ==
Word - University of Aberdeen writers festival website
