= Hector Munro Macdonald =

Scottish mathematician

Professor Hector Munro Macdonald OBE FRS FRAS FRSE
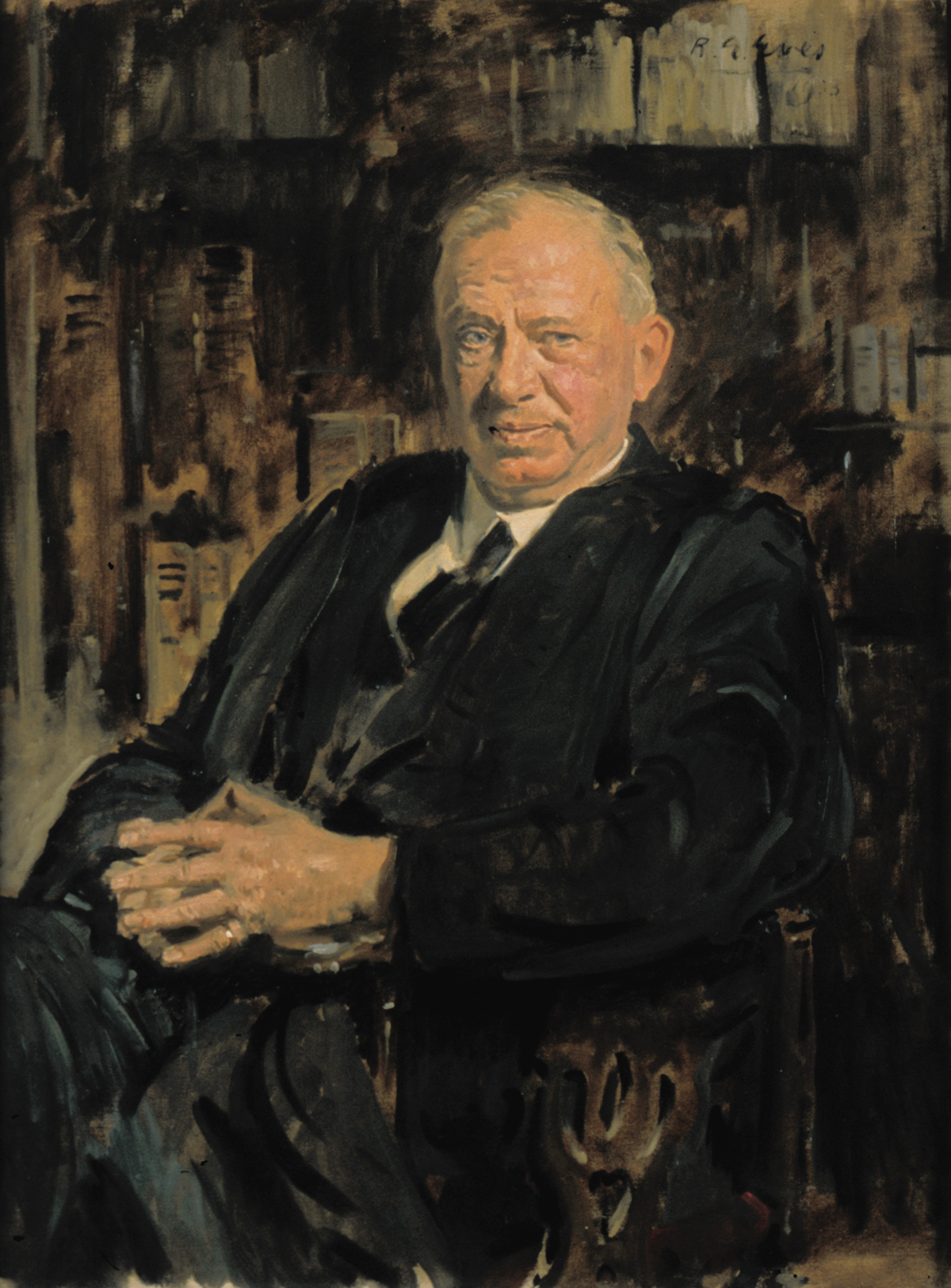

Professor of Mathematics, University of Aberdeen
- In office 1905–1935

Personal details
- Born: 19 January 1865
- Died: 16 May 1935 (aged 70) Aberdeen, Scotland

Hector Munro Macdonald (19 January 1865 – 16 May 1935) was a Scottish mathematician, born in Edinburgh in 1865. He researched pure mathematics at Cambridge University after graduating from Aberdeen University with an honours degree.

== Life ==
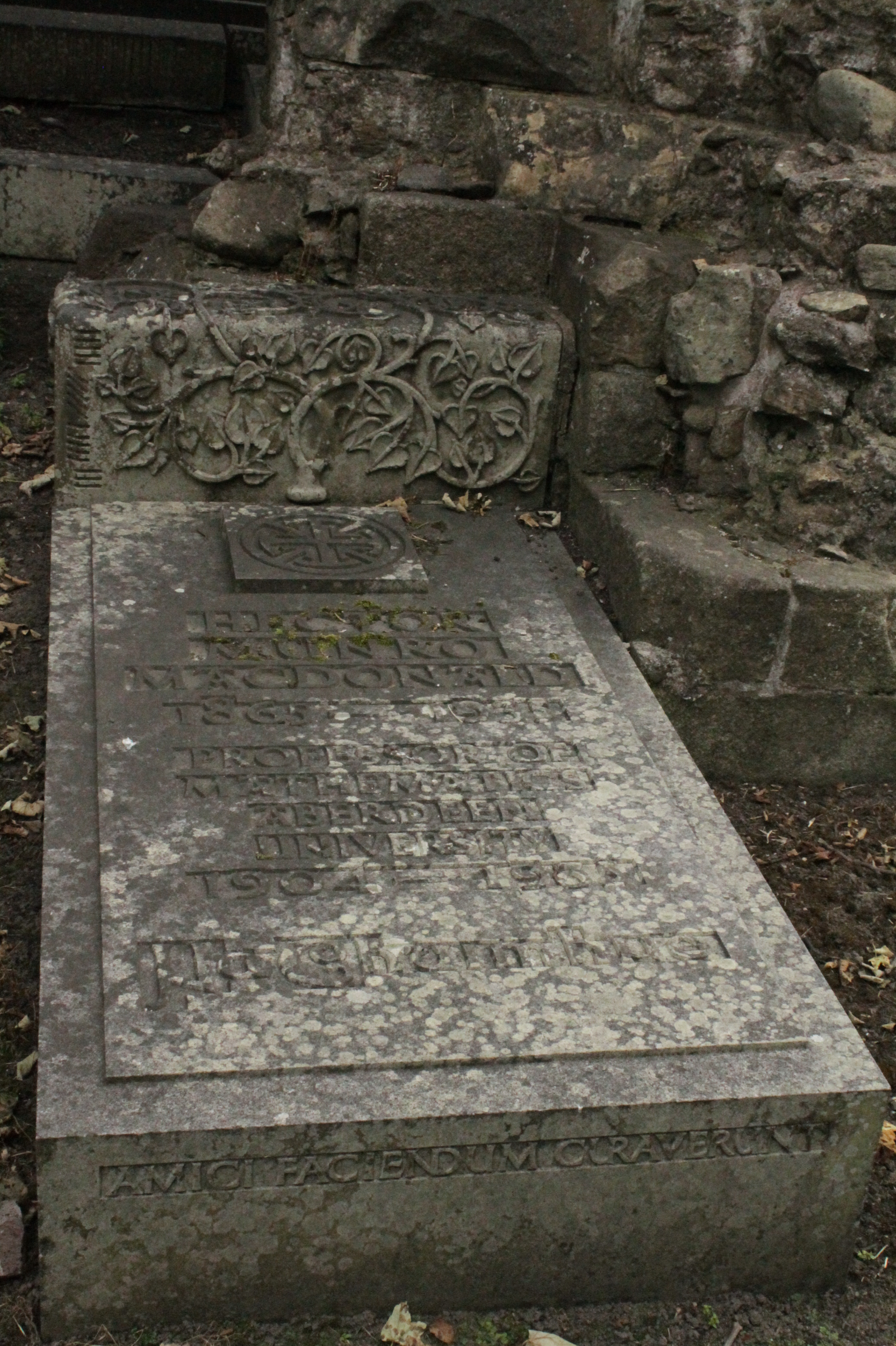
The grave of Prof Hector Munro MacDonald, St Machar's Cathedral

Both of Hector Macdonald's parents, his mother Annie Munro and his father Donald Macdonald, were from Kiltearn. Hector was the older of his parents' two sons and, as a young child, he lived in Edinburgh. However, not long after he began his schooling in the Scottish capital, the family moved to a farm near Hill of Fearn, in Easter Ross. After arriving, Hector attended the local school before attending the Royal Academy in Tain. He completed his school education at the Old Aberdeen Grammar School before entering Aberdeen University in 1882.

After studying mathematics at Aberdeen University, he graduated with First Class Honours in 1886 and won a Fullerton Scholarship. Macdonald proceeded to Cambridge to take the Mathematical Tripos after completing his first degree in Scotland. Entering Clare College, Cambridge, as a foundation scholar, he graduated as fourth Wrangler in the Mathematical Tripos of 1889, was awarded a fellowship at Clare in the following year and, in 1891, was awarded the second Smith's Prize.

In 1901 he received the Adams Prize and was elected a Fellow of the Royal Society of London (FRS). He was awarded the Royal Society's Royal Medal in 1916.

Macdonald held his fellowship at Clare College until 1908 and in 1914 he was awarded an honorary fellowship of his former College. From 1916 to 1918 he served as President of the London Mathematical Society. During World War I, Macdonald did war service in London attached to the Ministry of Munitions where he dealt with wages. He was transferred to the Ministry of Labour in 1916, where he remained until 1919. For his services he was appointed an Officer of the Order of the British Empire in the 1918 Birthday Honours.

Macdonald worked on electric waves and solved difficult problems regarding diffraction of these waves by summing series of Bessel functions. He corrected his 1903 solution to the problem of a perfectly conducting sphere embedded in an infinite homogeneous dielectric in 1904 after a subtle error was pointed out by Poincaré. The major problem which he tackled was that of wireless waves. About the time that Macdonald published his prize winning essay on electric waves, Guglielmo Marconi was successful in the transmission of the first wireless signals across the Atlantic. However this posed a major problem at first because wireless signals, like light, should not be capable of being bent round the surface of the earth as apparently Marconi wireless signals were. Macdonald suggested that the wireless waves were being refracted by the atmosphere. It is now known that in fact the waves are reflected by the ionosphere.

Macdonald became Professor of Mathematics at the University of Aberdeen in 1905 and remained at the university for the rest of his life, living at 33 College Bounds. In 1905 he was also elected a Fellow of the Royal Society of Edinburgh. His proposers were George Chrystal, George Alexander Gibson, Cargill Gilston Knott and James Gordon MacGregor.

He died in 1935 in Aberdeen. He is buried against the east wall of St Machar's Cathedral in Old Aberdeen.

== Family ==
He had never married and had no children.

== Publications ==
- Electric Waves (1902)
