= Sheena Blackhall =

Scottish writer

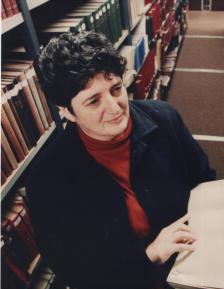
- Sheena Blackhall
- Born: Sheena Booth Middleton; 1947 (age 78–79); Aberdeen
- Occupations: poet, novelist, short story writer, illustrator, traditional story teller and singer
- Writing career
- Language: Scots, English

Sheena Blackhall is a Scottish poet, novelist, short story writer, illustrator, traditional story teller and singer. Author of over 180 poetry pamphlets, 15 short story collections, 4 novels and 2 televised plays for children, The Nicht Bus and The Broken Hert. Along with Les Wheeler, she co-edits the Doric resource Elphinstone Kist, and has worked on the Aberdeen Reading Bus, as a storyteller and writer, also sitting on the editorial board for their children's publications in Doric, promoting Scots culture and language in the North East. In 2018, Aberdeen University awarded her the degree of Master of the University. In 2021 she was appointed SPL’s poetry ambassador for the Scots language.

== Biography ==
Sheena Blackhall (b. Sheena Booth Middleton) was born in 1947 in Aberdeen, daughter of the manager of Strachan's Deeside Omnibus Service, Charles Middleton, and his second cousin, farmer's daughter Winifred Booth. She was educated in Aberdeen, but summered in Ballater for many years. Her brother, Ian Middleton, was an accomplished organist and clavichord player, who was the manager of a merchant bank in São Paulo, Brazil, where he settled and died. During the typhoid epidemic in Aberdeen of 1964, Blackhall was hospitalized in the town's City Hospital for several weeks. The family transport firm, owned by her aunt, closed as a side effect of this.

After a year's study at Gray's School of Art, Blackhall passed a teaching diploma and worked for a time as a special education teacher, marrying and raising a family of 4 in this period, when she wrote children's stories for BBC Radio Scotland. In 1994 she obtained a Bsc (Hons. Psych) from the Open University, going on to gain an M.Litt with Distinction from Aberdeen University in 2000. From 1998–2003 she was Creative Writing Fellow in Scots at Aberdeen University's Elphinstone Institute and is currently attached to the Institute as an Honorary Research Associate. In 2003 she travelled as part of a group to Washington, showcasing Scotland's culture as a guest of the Smithsonian Institution. In 2007 she was Creative Writing Tutor at the Institute of Irish and Scottish studies at King's College, and two years later was Writer in Residence during Aberdeen University's Word Festival. In April 2009 she was inaugurated as Makar for Aberdeen and the North East of Scotland. The Doric Board appointed Blackhall North East Makar for 3 years in November 2019. She has had over 190 pamphlets published. In 2023 she was accepted into the Order of the Scottish Samurai.

== Awards and honours ==
She has won the Robert McLellan tassie for best Scots short story 3 times (1989, 1990, 2001) and the Hugh MacDiarmid trophy for best Scots poem 4 times (1990, 2000, 2001, 2010). In 1992, she shared the Sloane Award with Matthew Fitt from St. Andrew's University. Other prizes include awards from the Doric Festival, the Bennachie Baillies, and from the TMSA for ballad writing and traditional singing. She has twice been shortlisted for the Callum Macdonald Poetry Pamphlet prize (2005 & 2009). In 2007, Lallans Magazine awarded her the William Gilchrist Graham prize for best Scots short story. She has also been shortlisted for the McCash poetry prize. She has also won the prize for best Scots Poem at Wigtown. Her short story 'The Wall', was the winning entry in Bipolar Scotland's 2013 competition, featuring in the Scottish Mental Health Arts and Film Festival. In 2016 she became an Honorary Fellow of the WORD Centre for Creative Writing, Aberdeen University. In 2019 she was presented with The Janet Paisley Lifetime Achievement Award. In 2020 Blackhall became an Honorary Officer of Merit of the Confraternity of the Knights of the Most Holy Trinity (Priory of Scotland). She was to be awarded the Eagle of Honour medal, to be presented by the Knights after the coronavirus pandemic passed.

== Works ==
=== Novels ===
- Double Heider Loon 2003 (Itchy Coo) ISBN 1-902927-72-9
- Minnie 3 x CDs, one book (SLRC) 2004 ISBN 1-899920-03-X
- The Quarry Lochlands 2007
- The Gods of Grayfriars Lane Lochlands 2008
- Millie ( Reading Bus) 2010 ISBN 978-0-9564837-4-4
- Jean Eyre by Charlotte Brontë. 2018. Translated into North-East Scots by Sheena Blackhall and Sheila Templeton. Evertype. ISBN 978-1-78201-215-3
- Fey Case o Dr Jekyll an Mr Hyde by Robert Louis Stevenson. 2018. Translated into North-East Scots by Sheena Blackhall, and with illustrations by Mathew Staunton. Evertype. ISBN 978-1-78201-226-9
- The Winnerfu Warlock o Oz by L. Frank Baum. 2018. Translated into North-East Scots by Sheena Blackhall, and illustrated by W. W. Denslow. Evertype. ISBN 978-1-78201-218-4.
- Translation into North East Scots by Sheena Blackhall of O Mice and Men by John Steinbeck pub. evertype 2018 ISBN 978-1-78201-229-0
- Wudderin Heichts by Emily Brontë. 2024 Translation into North East Scots by Sheena Blackhall and Linda Smith ISBN 978-1-7394667-3-2

=== Short stories ===
- Nippick o Nor East Tales Keith Murray Publications 1989 ISBN 1-870978-09-9
- Reets Keith Murray Publications 1991 ISBN 1-870978-33-1
- A Hint o Granite Hammerfield Publications 1992
- Braeheid. A Fairm an its Fowk Hammerfield Publishing 1993
- A Kenspeckle Creel Hammerfield Publishing 1995
- Wittgenstein's Web G.K.B.Enterprises 1996 ISBN 0-9526554-1-1
- The Bonsai Grower GKB Enterprises 1998 ISBN 0-9526554-2-X
- The Fower Quarters GKB Enterprises 2002 ISBN 0-9526554-6-2
- Indian Peter Thistle Reprographics, Limited Edition 2004 (children's stories in Scots)
- Pie in the Sky Thistle Reprographics, Limited Edition 2004 (adult stories)
- Victor Vratch & ither bairn tales Lochlands, Maud, 2009
- Isle o the Deid Malfranteaux Concepts 2010 ISBN 978-1-870978-63-7
- The Jam Jar
- 2013: Aberdeenshire Folk Tales By Grace Banks & Sheena Blackhall, pub by The History Press, 2013 ISBN 9780752497587.
- 2014: Scottish Urban Myths and Ancient Legends (Urban Legends) by Sheena Blackhall, & Grace Banks pub. The History Press ISBN 978 0 7509 5622 2
- The Chimaera Institute: e-book 2011 Smashwords
- The Honey that Came from the sea: e-book Smashwords
- Jessie the Jumbo: e-book 2014 : e.pub smashwords.com

=== Poetry books ===
- Blackhall, Sheena (2014) The Space Between: New and Selected Poems Aberdeen University Press, pp. 153 + xiv. ISBN 978-1-85752-005-7
- Stagwyse Selected Poems Charles Murray Trust 1995 ISBN 0-9521142-5-9
- The Skreich, Poems in Scots & English Lochlands 2010
- Victor Vratch the Craa Lochlands 2009
- Figurehead (Poems & Prose) Lochlands 2009
- The Ship of Fools (Poems & Story) Malfranteaux Concepts 2009
- Cats in a Gale Lochlands 2009
- Danse Macabre: Writings Round a Festival (Poems & Songs) Lochlands 2009
- A Visit to Planet Auschwitz (Poems & Prose) Lochlands 2009
- The Barley Queen (Poems & Prose) Malfranteaux Concepts 2009
- Peacock (Poems) Lochlands 2009
- Wittins (Selected Poems) Diehard Publishers 2010
- The Young Wife pamphlet no 181 pub Malfranteaux Concepts
- The Dall pamphlet no 200 pub Malfranteaux Concepts May 2024
- An Unfinished Work pamphlet no 201 pub Malfranteaux Concepts June 2024
- The Hanged Chiel, Scots and English Poems & Tales pamphlet no 202 pub Malfranteaux Concepts July 2024
- Neptune's Staircase, Poems, tales, owersettins in Scots and English pamphlet no 203 pub Malfranteaux Concepts August 2024
- Ovid Love Poems, Vietnamese Tales in Scots and English pamphlet no 204 pub Malfranteaux Concepts September 2024
- A Matter Of Lunacy, Poems in Scots and English pamphlet no 205 pub Malfranteaux Concepts October 2024
- Roadkill, Poems and Prose pamphlet 206 pub Malfranteaux Concepts November 2024
- On the Rocks, Poems and Tales in Scots and English, pamphlet 207 pub Malfranteaux Concepts 2024-2025 Winter
- The Cloud Spikks, Poems and Tales in Scots and English, pamphlet 208 pub Malfranteaux Concepts February 2025
- Stottin Cats, Poems and Tales in Scots and English, pamphlet 209 pub Malfranteaux Concepts March - April 2025
- Knife Angel, Work in Scots and English, pamphlet 210 pub Malfranteaux Concepts May–June 2025
- The Octopus, Poems, Owersetts, Tales in Doric and English, pamphlet 211 pub Malfranteaux Concepts July 2025
- The Boat People, Poems & Owersetts in Doric and English, pamphlet 212 pub Malfranteaux Concepts August 2025
- Teasag, Poems & Owersetts in Scots & English, pamphlet 213 pub Malfranteaux Concepts September 2025
- Anarcha, Lucy and Betsey, Poems & Owersetts in Doric & English, pamphlet 214 pub Malfranteaux Concepts October 2025
- Spilling the Beans, Poems & Tales in Doric & English, pamphlet 215 pub Malfranteaux Concepts November 2025
- Marischal the Gargoyle, Tales, Poems & Owersetts in Doric & English, pamphlet 216 pub Malfranteaux Concepts December 2025
- Body Snatch, Poems, Tales, Owersetts in Scots & English, pamphlet 217 pub Malfranteaux Concepts January 2026
- The Papingo, Tales, Poems an Owersetts in Doric & English, pamphlet 218 pub Malfranteaux Concepts February 2026
- Good Riddance said the Skeleton, Poems & Prose in Scots & English, pamphlet 219 pub Malfranteaux Concepts March 2026
- The Drollery, Tales and Poems in Scots & English, pamphlet 220 pub Malfranteaux Concepts April 2026
- The Bookworm, Tales and Poems in Scots & English, pamphlet 221 pub Malfranteaux Concepts May 2026
- Doomscrolling, Poems and Prose in Scots & English, pamphlet 222 pub Malfranteaux Concepts June 2026
- The Ancestor, Poems and Prose in Scots & English, pamphlet 223 pub Malfranteaux Concepts July 2026
- The Shakers, Poems and Prose in Scots & English, pamphlet 224 pub Malfranteaux Concepts July 2026
- ‘Chunnacas na mairbh beò’ ('The Dead Have Been Seen Alive'), Poems and Prose in Scots & English, pamphlet 225 pub Malfranteaux Concepts August 2026
- The Bayeux Tapestry, Poems and Prose in Scots and English, pamphlet 226 pub Malfranteaux Concepts September 2026
- Jeepers Creepers, Scots and English Poems and Prose, pamphlet 227 pub Malfranteaux concepts October 2026
- A Bard's Life, published by Rymour Books 2021
