= Robbie Shepherd =

British radio personality (1936–2023)

Robert Shepherd
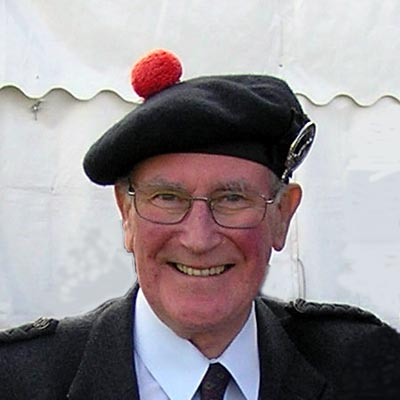
- Born: 28 April 1936; Dunecht, Aberdeenshire, Scotland
- Died: 1 August 2023 (aged 87)
- Spouse: Esma Dickson (m. 1961)

Dr Robert Horne Shepherd MBE (28 April 1936 – 1 August 2023) was a Scottish broadcaster and author who was known for presenting shows on BBC Radio Scotland and for writing a column in Doric for Aberdeen's Press and Journal newspaper.

== Life and career ==
Shepherd was born in Dunecht, Aberdeenshire, Scotland, on 28 April 1936. In the 1950s, he worked as an accountant on Union Terrace in Aberdeen, while additionally trying to be a musician, playing the mouth organ. Afterwards he started working as a compère for variety shows. He also worked as a producer for variety shows and theatres, before moving on to broadcasting.

In 1980, he took over as presenter of the BBC Radio Scotland show Take the Floor, the longest-running radio programme produced in Scotland, which he hosted until 2016. He also hosted The Reel Blend, again for BBC Radio Scotland, and presented episodes of The Beechgrove Garden and sheepdog trials on television for BBC Scotland. Shepherd also wrote books on Scottish dance music and Scottish country dancing, which were well known interests of his.

Shepherd was a fluent Doric speaker, a dialect spoken across the northeast of Scotland. He has written books about the Doric dialect, in Doric. In April 1993 he started writing a column in Doric for the Press and Journal—his Doric column. Some time later, his column was cancelled, but due to outcry from readers was eventually reinstated. He wrote his last piece in the column on 15 July 2023, two weeks before his death.

Shepherd was the commentator at the Braemar Gathering and an honoured life member of the Braemar Royal Highland Society. He also commentated at other Highland games throughout Scotland, including Oldmeldrum and the Lonach Highland Gathering at Strathdon. He often commented together with his friend Robert Lovie.

A documentary about Shepherd's career aired on BBC Alba and BBC One Scotland in December 2013.

Shepherd met his wife, Esma Dickson, on a bus. They married at Cluny Churchyard on 23 September 1961 and remained married until his death.

== Death ==
Shepherd died on 1 August 2023, at the age of 87.

== Awards and honours ==
Shepherd was honoured with an MBE in the 2001 New Year Honours for services to Scottish Dance Music and to Scottish Culture. Later in 2001, the University of Aberdeen awarded him an honorary degree, as Master of the University (M.Univ). He was awarded several other prizes and honours from Scottish music and Scottish country dance organisations in recognition of his support and work.

== Bibliography ==
- Let's Have a Ceilidh: Essential Guide to Scottish Dancing (1992), ISBN 0862414121.
- A Dash O' Doric: The Wit and Wisdom of the North-East (1995), ISBN 0862415616.
- Anither Dash O'Doric (1996), ISBN 086241637X.
- Dash O'Doric 3: One for the Road (2004), ISBN 1841583243.
- Robbie Shepherd's Doric Columns (2006), ISBN 1841585246.
