= David Wedderburn (writer) =

Scottish writer

- Born: 1580
- Died: 23 October 1646 (aged 65–66)
- Employer(s): Aberdeen Grammar School; Marischal College

David Wedderburn (c.1580 – 23 October 1646) was a writer, and schoolmaster at Aberdeen Grammar School. Though his date of birth is not known, he was baptised on 2 January 1580.

He was educated in Aberdeen, probably at Marischal College. He started working at Aberdeen Grammar School in April 1602. In 1614, the previous principal of Marischal College, Gilbert Gray, died, and Wedderburn was appointed interim principal, later teaching humanities (which he was forced to resign ten years later).

Wedderburn contributed a Latin poem for the celebrations to welcome James VI and I to Falkland Palace on 19 May 1617. This was the first royal visit to Scotland since 1603. In the poem the King, after a day of hunting, is asked to contemplate the memorials of Scotland's past, victories over the Romans and Vikings, the wars of Scottish Independence, and the present union of the kingdoms of Britain. The poem was presented again when some of the royal party visited Aberdeen, and the burgh corporation gave Wedderburn 50 merks.

He had a number of publications, including his 1633 work Institutiones grammaticae; and Vocabula, first published in 1636. He died in Aberdeen.

== Vocabula ==
This was a Latin grammar, using sporting exemplars to help teach Latin.

The golf section was titled Baculus, a stick. Wedderburn believed that this was the derivation of the term golf as meaning 'club'. There were a number of other golf terms including the first clear mention of the golf hole.

Vocabula is also notable for an early reference to schoolboy football and contains a sentence to "keep goal". The account was first published in 1938 by Francis Peabody Magoun, an American historian. Magoun gives the original Latin text (see later) and his English translation:

"Let us choose sides pick your man first Those on our side come here How many are against us? Kick out the ball so that we may begin the game Come, kick it here You keep the goal Snatch the ball from that fellow if you can Come, throw yourself against him Run at him Kick the ball back Well done. You aren't doing anything To make a goal This is the first goal, this the second, this the third Drive that man back The opponents are, moreover, coming out on top, If you don't look out, he will make a goal Unless we play better, we'll be done for Ah, victory is in your hands Ha, hurrah. He is a very skilled ball player Had it not been for him, we should have brought back the victory Come, help me. We still have the better chance"

(The original Latin cited with minor corrections by Magoun (1938): Sortiamur partes; tu primum socium dilige; Qui sunt nostrarum partium huc se recipient; Quot nobis adversantur; Excute pilam ut ineamus certamen; Age, huc percute; Tu tuere metum; Praeripe illi pilam si possis agere; Age objice te illi; Occurre illi; Repercute pilam; Egregie. Nihil agis; Transmittere metum pila; Hic primus est transmissus. Hic secundus, hic tertius est transmissus; Repelle eum, alioqui, adversarii evadunt superiores; Nisi cavesjam occupabit metam; Ni melius a nobis ludatur, de nobis actum est. Eia penes vos victoria est; Io triumphe. Est pilae doctissimus; Asque eo fuisset, reportassimus victoriam; Age, subservi mihi; Adhuc potiores habemus, scilicet partes)
