= Scotland the What? =

Scottish comedy act

Scotland the What? were a Scottish comedy revue act comprising William "Buff" Hardie, Stephen Robertson and George Donald.

== History ==
Buff Hardie and Steve Robertson first met in the Aberdeen Student Show in 1952. George Donald, another University of Aberdeen student, wrote music for the 1954 Student Show, but did not take part in it. So all three only met together later through the Aberdeen Revue Group, which is where they also found their future producer Jimmy Logan. (He later had to revert in public to his formal first name "James" in order to join the actors' union Equity, because there was already a Glaswegian comic using the professional name Jimmy Logan.) Buff Hardie had first appeared in the 1951 Student Show 'Spring in Your Step', and co-wrote the 1957 show College Bounds. But it was after the 1968 student show Running Riot – which the four men wrote, composed, produced and directed – that the idea of putting on a show of their own at the Edinburgh Festival was first mooted. Jimmy Logan directed "Scotland the What?" from 1969 until his death in 1993.

The trio first appeared under the banner of "Scotland the What?" at the Edinburgh Festival Fringe in 1969. They became a 'hot ticket' when Neville Garden from the Scottish Daily Express newspaper wrote a favourable review. They described themselves at the outset as "three semi-literate Scots taking an irreverent look at their country's institutions," and for the following 26 years (14 years with the same Stage Manager, Peter Garland) the trio proceeded to do just that. Prior to each show, they had a handshaking ritual at the side of the stage which continued until their final performance, which was at His Majesty's Theatre, Aberdeen on 25 November 1995. The trio were awarded MBEs in 1995, having already received honorary degrees from Aberdeen University in 1994.

The trio played to sell-out audiences in their home city of Aberdeen and in locations throughout the world. The sketches and songs which they performed were largely based in the local dialect of the North-east of Scotland known as the Doric. They were often set in a fictional Aberdeenshire village called "Auchterturra". After the death of Jimmy Logan in 1993, the on stage trio were then directed by Alan Franchi, who had previously directed their shows for Grampian Television.

== Legacy ==
On 25 April 2007, Aberdeen City Council approved a motion by Councillor Ramsay Milne to award the Freedom of the City of Aberdeen to the trio for "their services to the Fine Arts, the Doric language and North East of Scotland culture; promotion of the City and, above all, for makin' a'body laugh." The conferral took place on 20 April 2008 at His Majesty's Theatre.

An Early Day Motion tabled at the House of Commons by Malcolm Bruce MP asked that "That this House congratulates Scotland the What?, comprising Buff Hardie, Stephen Robertson and George Donald, on receiving the Freedom of the City of Aberdeen and thanks them for 50 years of entertainment and the promotion of Aberdeen, the Doric dialect and the distinctive character of North East country and city folk and, to quote the official citation, above all, for 'makin a'body laugh'." As at 8 May 2008 it had 23 signatures.

Steve Robertson also appeared in "Bon Record!" – a show to celebrate the 750th anniversary of Aberdeen Grammar School – the school that he attended. (The school motto "Bon Record" is a play on words of the motto of Aberdeen City, which is "Bon Accord".)

In May 2008 Stephen Robertson was elected as Rector of the University of Aberdeen; his installation took place in October 2008. He died in November 2011.

In September 2013 George Donald died aged 79, and in 2020 Buff Hardie died aged 89.

== Bibliography ==
- Hardie, Buff, Stephen Robertson, George Donald, Scotland the What? (Edinburgh: Gordon Wright, 1987). ISBN 978-0-903065-59-7
- Hardie, Buff, Stephen Robertson, George Donald, Scotland the What? – Second Helping (Edinburgh: Gordon Wright, 1996). ISBN 978-0-903065-85-6
