= Catherine Hollingworth =

Scottish speech therapist (1904–1999)

Catherine Hollingworth OBE, FRCSLT
- Born: 19 February 1904; Forfar, Angus, Scotland
- Died: 25 July 1999 (aged 95); Aberdeen, Aberdeenshire, Scotland
- Occupation: Speech therapist

Catherine Hollingworth, OBE, FRCSLT (19 February 1904 – 25 July 1999) was a Scottish speech therapist and a pioneer of Child drama.

== Career ==
Hollingworth started her teaching career in speech training at St Margaret's School in Aberdeen in 1927 and then taught in her home town of Forfar before moving to London, where she spent time observing the work done by surgeons who were using speech therapy on their patients after throat operations. She set up her own practice as a result of these experiences. The evacuation of civilians during World War II prompted Hollingworth to return to Aberdeen in 1941, where she was appointed as speech specialist for the education department. The following year she founded The Children's Theatre, which went on to develop an international reputation.

== Awards ==
Hollingworth was elected a Fellow of the Royal College of Speech and Language Therapists in 1959.

She was awarded an OBE in the 1965 Birthday Honours whilst serving as the Superintendent of Speech Therapy and Speech Training for Aberdeen.

Hollingworth is named in a commemorative plaque outside of the Aberdeen Municipal Children's Theatre. It reads: "CATHERINE HOLLINGWORTH 1904–1999. Child drama pioneer, speech therapist and founder of Aberdeen Municipal Children's Theatre which she directed in this building 1956–1968."

== Selected publications ==
- Hollingworth, C. 1993. Building bridges. Edinburgh: Pentland Press.
- Hollingworth, C. and Rennie, M. 1997. Another pied piper? : a personal history of my work in Aberdeen and elsewhere. Aberdeen: Morrison & Richards.
