= Kennedy Thomson =

Scottish broadcaster

- Born: April 4, 1936
- Died: May 22, 1996 (aged 60)
- Occupation: Television presenter
- Years active: 1970–1996
- Employer: ITV

Kennedy Thomson (4 April 1936 – 22 May 1996) was a Scottish broadcaster and actor, best known for his work at Grampian Television.

Born in Glasgow on 4 April 1936, he studied drama at Jordanhill College and Glasgow University and gained a diploma from the Royal Scottish Academy of Music and Drama.

In his home city, he worked with the Citizens Theatre, BBC Scotland and Scottish Television before moving to Aberdeen in 1969 to oversee speech training at the city's College of Commerce.

The following year, Thomson joined Grampian as a continuity announcer and also read regional news bulletins (North News, North Headlines, Grampian Headlines) throughout the day.

He was also a presenter on various programmes for the station including schools programme Mathman (as the title character), Wonder Weekly, Wings & Things and the film magazine series The Electric Theatre Show. Thomson also presented a request show for Grampian Hospital Radio in Aberdeen and served as adjudicator for the Scottish Community Drama Association.

He took early retirement in January 1996 as his health deteriorated. Thomson died on 22 May 1996, aged 60, following a long battle with cancer.
