= Doric dialect (Scotland) =

Northeastern dialect of the Scots language

A Doric Scots speaker, recorded in Scotland

Doric, the popular name for Mid Northern Scots or Northeast Scots, refers to the Scots as spoken in the northeast of Scotland. There is an extensive body of literature, mostly poetry, ballads, and songs, written in Doric. In some literary works, Doric is used as the language of conversation while the rest of the work is in Lallans Scots or Scottish English. A number of 20th and 21st century poets have written poetry in the Doric dialect.

== Nomenclature ==
The term "Doric" was formerly used to refer to all dialects of Scots, but during the twentieth century it became increasingly associated with Mid Northern Scots.

The name possibly originated as a jocular reference to the Doric Greek dialect of the Ancient Greek language. Greek Dorians lived in Laconia, including Sparta, and other more rural areas, and were alleged by the ancient Greeks to have spoken laconically and in a language thought harsher in tone and more phonetically conservative than the Attic spoken in Athens. Doric Greek was used for some of the verses spoken by the chorus in Greek tragedy.

According to The Oxford Companion to English Literature:

Since the Dorians were regarded as uncivilised by the Athenians, "Doric" came to mean "rustic" in English, and was applied particularly to the language of Northumbria and the Scottish Lowlands and also to the simplest of the three orders in architecture.

18th-century Scots writers such as Allan Ramsay justified their use of Scots (instead of English) by comparing it to the use of Ancient Greek Doric by Theocritus. English became associated with Attic.

== Phonology ==
Most consonants are usually pronounced much as in other Modern Scots dialects but:

- In Buchan the cluster cht, also ght, may be realised /ð/ in some words, rather than /xt/ as in other dialects, for example: dochter (daughter), micht (might) and nocht (nought), often written dother, mith and noth in dialect writing.
- The clusters gn and kn are realised /ɡn/ and /kn/, for example gnaw, gnap, knee, knife, knock (a clock) and knowe (knoll).
- In Buchan, towards the coast, th followed by er may be realised /d/, rather than /ð/ as in other dialects, for example: brither (brother), faither (father), gaither (gather) and mither (mother), often written bridder, fadder, gaider~gedder and midder in dialect writing.
- wh is realised /f/, rather than /ʍ/ as in Central Scots dialects, for example whit (what) and wha (who), often written fit and fa(a) in dialect writing.
- The cluster wr may be realised /vr/, rather than /r/ as in Central Scots dialects, for example wratch (wretch), wrath, wricht (wright) and wrocht (wrought~worked), often written vratch, vrath, vricht and vrocht in dialect writing.

Some vowel realisations differ markedly from those of Central Scots dialects. The vowel numbers are from Aitken. See also Cardinal vowels.

- a before /b/, /ɡ/, /m/ and /ŋ/ may be /ə/ or /ʌ/ rather than /a(ː)/.
- aw and au, sometimes a or a' representing L-vocalisation, are realised /aː/, rather than /ɑː/ or /ɔː/ as in Central Scots dialects, for example aw (all), cauld (cold), braw (brave, handsome, fine, splendid), faw (fall) and snaw (snow), often written aa, caal(d), braa, faa and snaa in dialect writing. In Buchan, in some words the stem final w may be realised /v/, often with a /j/ glide before the preceding vowel, for example awe [jaːv] (awe), blaw [bl(j)aːv] (blow), gnaw [ɡnjaːv], law [ljaːv], snaw [snjaːv] (snow) and taw [tjaːv]~[tʃaːv] often written yaave, blyaave, gnaave, snyaave and tyauve~tyaave~chaave in dialect writing.
- In some areas ai or a (consonant) e /e(ː)/ may be realised /əi/ after /w/, dark /l/ and occasionally after other consonants, for example claes (clothes), coal, coat, gape, wade, waik (weak), wait, wale (choose) and wame (belly), often written clyes, kwile, kwite, gype, wyde, wyke, wyte, wyle and wyme in dialect writing. A preceding /k/ or /n/ may produce a /j/ glide, with the vowel realised /a/, for example caird [kjard] (card), cake [kjak], naig [njaɡ] (nag) and nakit [njakɪt] (naked). The cluster ane is realised /en/ in Moray and Nairn but is usually /in/ in other areas, for example, ane (one) ance (once), bane (bone) and stane (stone), often written een, eence, been and steen in dialect writing.
- ea, ei is usually /i(ː)/, though the realisation may be /e(ː)/ along the coast and in Moray and Nairn. The realisation may also be /əi/ in, for example, great, quean (girl), seiven (seven), sweit (sweat), weave and wheat, and /ɪ/ before /k/ in, for example, speak, often written gryte, quine, syven, swyte, wyve, fyte and spik(k) in dialect writing. Before /v/ and /z/ the realisation may be /ɪ/ in, for example, heiven (heaven), reason, season and seiven (seven), often written hivven, rizzon, sizzon and sivven in dialect writing.
- ee, e(Consonant)e. Occasionally ei and ie with ei generally before ch (/x/), but also in a few other words, and ie generally occurring before l and v. The realisation is generally /i(ː)/ but may be /əi/ after /w/, dark /l/ and occasionally after other consonants in, for example, cheenge (change), heeze (lift) and swee (sway), often written chynge, hyse and swye in dialect writing.
- eu before /k/ and /x/ see ui), sometimes ui and oo after Standard English also occur, is generally /ju/ in for example, beuk (book), eneuch (enough), ceuk (cook), leuk (look) and teuk (took).
- Stem final ew may be realised /jʌu/ in, for example, few, new and also in beauty and duty, often written fyow(e), nyow(e), byowty and dyowty in dialect writing. Before /k/ the realisation may be /ɪ/ in, for example, week, often written wyke in dialect writing.
- ui is realised /i(ː)/ and /wi(ː)/ after /ɡ/ and /k/. Also u (consonant) e, especially before nasals, and oo from the spelling of Standard English cognates, in for example, abuin (above), cuit (ankle) and guid (good), often written abeen, queet and gweed in dialect writing. In Moray and Nairn the realisation is usually /(j)uː/ before /r/ in, for example, buird (board), fluir (floor) and fuird (ford), often written boord, floor and foord in dialect writing. The realisation [i(ː)] also occurs in adae (ado), dae (do), shae (shoe) and tae (to~too).

== Literature ==
North East Scots has an extensive body of literature, mostly poetry, ballads and songs. During the Middle Scots period writing from the North East of Scotland adhered to the literary conventions of the time; indications of particular "Doric" pronunciations were very rare. The 18th-century literary revival also brought forth writers from the North East but, again, local dialect features were rare, the extant literary Scots conventions being preferred. In later times, a more deliberately regional literature began to emerge.

In contemporary prose writing, Doric occurs usually as quoted speech, although this is less and less often the case. As is usually the case with marginalised languages, local loyalties prevail in the written form, showing how the variety "deviates" from standard ("British") English as opposed to a general literary Scots "norm". This shows itself in the local media presentation of the language, e.g., Grampian Television & The Aberdeen Press and Journal. These local loyalties, waning knowledge of the older literary tradition and relative distance from the Central Lowlands ensure that the Doric scene has a degree of semi-autonomy.

Doric dialogue was used in a lot of so-called Kailyard literature, a genre that paints a sentimental, melodramatic picture of the old rural life, and is currently unfashionable. This negative association still plagues Doric literature to a degree, as well as Scottish literature in general.

Poets who wrote in the Doric dialect include John M. Caie of Banffshire (1879–1949), Helen B. Cruickshank of Angus (1886–1975), Alexander Fenton (1929–2012), Flora Garry (1900–2000), Sir Alexander Gray (1882–1968), Violet Jacob of Angus (1863–1946), Charles Murray (1864–1941) and J. C. Milne (1897–1962).

George MacDonald from Huntly used Doric in his novels. A friend of Mark Twain, he is commonly considered one of the fathers of the fantasy genre and an influence on C. S. Lewis and J. R. R. Tolkien.

Lewis Grassic Gibbon's Scots Quair trilogy is set in the Mearns and has been the basis of a successful play and television series. It is very popular throughout Scotland and tells the story of Chris, an independent-minded woman, mainly in a form of English strongly influenced by the rhythms of local speech.

A version of Aesop's Fables has been published in Doric, as well as some sections of the Bible.

The North East has been claimed as the "real home of the ballad" and, according to Les Wheeler, "91 out of a grand total of (Child's) 305 ballads came from the North East – in fact from Aberdeenshire", which makes the usual name of "Border Ballad" a misnomer put about by Sir Walter Scott.

Contemporary writers in Doric include Sheena Blackhall, a poet who writes in Doric, and Mo Simpson, who writes in the Aberdeen Evening Express and peppers her humour column with "Doricisms" and Doric words. Doric has also featured in stage, radio and television, notably in the sketches and songs of the Aberdeen-based comedy groups Scotland the What? and the Flying Pigs.

=== Sample text ===
Gin I was God by Charles Murray (1864–1941)

Doric

GIN I was God, sittin' up there abeen,
Weariet nae doot noo a' my darg was deen,
Deaved wi' the harps an' hymns oonendin' ringin',
.
Tired o' the flockin' angels hairse wi' singin',
To some clood-edge I'd daunder furth an', feth,
Look ower an' watch hoo things were gyaun aneth.
.
Syne, gin I saw hoo men I'd made mysel'
Had startit in to pooshan, sheet an' fell,
To reive an' rape, an' fairly mak' a hell
O' my braw birlin' Earth,—a hale week's wark—
I'd cast my coat again, rowe up my sark,
An' or they'd time to lench a second ark,
Tak' back my word an' sen' anither spate,
.
Droon oot the hale hypothec, dicht the sklate,
Own my mistak', an, aince I cleared the brod,
Start a'thing ower again, gin I was God.

Translation

IF I were God, sitting up there above,
Wearied no doubt, now all my work was done,
Deafened by the harps and hymns unending ringing,
Tired of the flocking angels hoarse with singing,
To some cloud edge I'd saunter forth and, faith,
Look over and watch how things were going beneath.
Then if I saw how men I'd made myself
Had started out to poison, shoot and kill [fell],
To steal and rape and fairly make a hell
Of my fine spinning Earth—a whole week's work—
I'd drop my coat again, roll up my shirt,
And, ere they'd time to launch a second ark,
Take back my word and send another flood [spate],
Drown out the whole shebang, wipe the slate,
Admit my mistake, and once I'd cleared the board,
Start everything ["all-thing"] over again, if I were God.

== Recent developments ==
In 2006 an Aberdeen hotel decided to use a Doric voice for their lift. Phrases said by the lift include "Gyaun Up" /ɡʲɑːn ʌp/ (Going up), "Gyaun Doun" /ɡʲɑːn dun/ (Going down), "atween fleers een an fower" /əˈtwin fliːrz in ən ˈfʌur/ (between floors one and four).

Also in 2006, Maureen Watt of the SNP took her Scottish Parliamentary oath in Doric. She said "I want to advance the cause of Doric and show there's a strong and important culture in the North East." She was required to take an oath in English beforehand. There was some debate as to whether the oath was "gweed Doric" (/ɡwid ˈdoːrɪk/) or not, and notably it is, to a certain extent, written phonetically and contains certain anglicised forms such as "I" rather than "A", and "and" instead of "an":

"I depone aat I wull be leal and bear ae full alleadgance tae her majesty Queen Elizabeth her airs an ony fa come aifter her anent the law. Sae help me God."

In Disney/Pixar's Brave, the character Young MacGuffin speaks the Doric dialect, and a running joke involves no one else understanding him. This was a choice by the voice actor, Kevin McKidd, a native of Elgin.

In autumn 2020, the University of Aberdeen launched a term-long Doric course, offering it to all its undergraduate students.

In August 2012, Gordon Hay, an Aberdeenshire author, successfully completed what is believed to be the first translation of the New Testament into Doric. The project took him six years. He subsequently completed the Old Testament in 2023.

== See also ==
- Modern Scots
- Shetland dialect
- Ulster Scots
- Norn language

== Sources ==
- Harper, Norman, Spik O The Place (Canongate Books, 1998)
- Harper, Norman (2009) Spikkin Doric. Edinburgh. Birlinn.
