= List of listed buildings in Aberdeen/5 =

This is a list of listed buildings in Aberdeen, Scotland.

== List ==
Name	Location	Date listed	Geo-coordinates	Notes	Category	LB number	Image
Tullos Primary School, Girdleness Road			57°07′53″N 2°04′38″W		B	49995	Upload Photo
Crombie Halls Of Residence, Meston Walk			57°09′50″N 2°06′15″W		A	50016	Upload another image
85 Western Road, St Machar Woodside Hall Including Boundary Walls, Gatepiers And Gates			57°10′10″N 2°07′34″W		C(S)	50052	Upload Photo
Old Ford Road, Smoke House			57°08′21″N 2°05′44″W		C(S)	50217	Upload Photo
Palmerston Road, Smoke Houses			57°08′26″N 2°05′46″W		C(S)	50218	Upload Photo
10-16 (Even Nos) Exchequer Row			57°08′51″N 2°05′41″W		C(S)	50935	Upload Photo
Mearns Quay And Torry Quay, Drainage Terminal And Valve House			57°08′27″N 2°04′42″W		C(S)	50953	Upload Photo
39-45 (Odd Nos) Union Street (Known As 41 1/2, Crown Court)			57°08′50″N 2°05′45″W		C(S)	45666	Upload Photo
38-40 Hutcheon Street			57°09′16″N 2°06′13″W		B	44554	Upload Photo
2 And 4 Upperkirkgate And 11 Gallowgate, Former Students Union			57°08′57″N 2°05′52″W		B	43377	Upload Photo
6 Rubislaw Den South, Including Gatepiers And Boundary Walls			57°08′35″N 2°08′08″W		C(S)	20797	Upload Photo
8 Rubislaw Den South, Including Gatepiers And Boundary Walls			57°08′35″N 2°08′08″W		C(S)	20798	Upload Photo
48 Rubislaw Den South, Including Gatepiers, Boundary Walls And Ancillary Structure			57°08′33″N 2°08′30″W		C(S)	20813	Upload Photo
56 Rubislaw Den South, Fortune Green, Including Gatepiers And Boundary Walls			57°08′33″N 2°08′33″W		B	20815	Upload Photo
53-57 (Odd Nos) Victoria Road And 2-8 (Even Nos) Sinclair Road, Torry			57°08′18″N 2°05′18″W		C(S)	20824	Upload Photo
Eday Road Woodend Hospital General Block Including Wards 5/7 & 6/8			57°08′53″N 2°10′24″W		B	20827	Upload Photo
Garthdee Road, Fountain House			57°07′17″N 2°07′32″W		C(S)	20834	Upload Photo
Fonthill Road And Polmuir Road, Ferryhill South Church, (Church Of Scotland), Including Hall, Gatepiers And Boundary Walls			57°08′11″N 2°06′18″W		B	20689	Upload Photo
3 Queen's Road, St Joseph's Roman Catholic Primary School			57°08′33″N 2°07′41″W		C(S)	20709	Upload Photo
31 Queen's Road, Including Gatepiers And Boundary Walls			57°08′29″N 2°08′01″W		C(S)	20722	Upload Photo
53 Queen's Road, The Queen's Hotel, Including Gatepiers And Boundary Walls			57°08′27″N 2°08′08″W		C(S)	20729	Upload Photo
14 Queen's Road, Including Gatepiers And Boundary Walls			57°08′33″N 2°07′52″W		C(S)	20736	Upload Photo
16 Queen's Road, Including Gatepiers And Boundary Walls			57°08′33″N 2°07′53″W		C(S)	20737	Upload Photo
18 Queen's Road, Including Gatepiers And Boundary Walls			57°08′33″N 2°07′54″W		C(S)	20738	Upload Photo
56 And 58 Queen's Road, Including Gatepiers And Boundary Walls			57°08′30″N 2°08′10″W		C(S)	20742	Upload Photo
84 Queen's Road At Bayview Road, Including Gatepiers And Boundary Walls			57°08′27″N 2°08′22″W		B	20750	Upload Photo
88 Queen's Road, Including Gatepiers And Boundary Walls			57°08′26″N 2°08′26″W		B	20752	Upload Photo
9 And 9A (Kimberley) Rubislaw Den North, Including Gatepiers And Boundary Walls			57°08′40″N 2°08′15″W		B	20762	Upload Photo
12 Rubislaw Den North, Including Gatepiers And Boundary Walls			57°08′42″N 2°08′13″W		C(S)	20770	Upload Photo
22 Rubislaw Den North, Including Gatepiers And Boundary Walls			57°08′42″N 2°08′17″W		C(S)	20774	Upload Photo
46 Rubislaw Den North, The Red House, Including Boundary Walls			57°08′41″N 2°08′22″W		B	20777	Upload Photo
58 Rubislaw Den North, Including Gatepiers And Boundary Walls			57°08′40″N 2°08′28″W		B	20779	Upload Photo
151 King Street			57°09′04″N 2°05′40″W		C(S)	20643	Upload Photo
30-34 (Even Nos) Schoolhill			57°08′53″N 2°06′01″W		C(S)	20646	Upload Photo
Causewayend School Causewayend Mounthooly			57°09′18″N 2°06′03″W		C(S)	20650	Upload Photo
10 Exchange Street			57°08′45″N 2°05′51″W		C(S)	20658	Upload Photo
61-65 (Odd Nos)_The Green			57°08′45″N 2°05′58″W		C(S)	20667	Upload Photo
Skene Street, Esslemont Avenue, Skene Street Church			57°08′48″N 2°06′47″W		B	20675	Upload Photo
Justice Mill Lane, Bon Accord Baths			57°08′30″N 2°06′38″W		B	20677	Upload another image
67 Fountainhall Road At Hamilton Place, Including Boundary Walls			57°08′45″N 2°07′46″W		C(S)	20630	Upload Photo
Castle Hill, Cromwellian Fort Bastion			57°08′54″N 2°05′24″W		C(S)	20604	Upload Photo
Union Street, 419,421			57°08′36″N 2°06′34″W		C(S)	20545	Upload Photo
St. Machar Drive, 66, 68 And 114 High Street, Old Aberdeen			57°10′02″N 2°06′07″W		C(S)	20479	Upload Photo
North Silver Street, 10			57°08′48″N 2°06′20″W		B	20492	Upload Photo
67 Union Street And 1 Market Street			57°08′49″N 2°05′50″W		B	20521	Upload Photo
82-96 (Even Nos) King Street And 2-8 (Even Nos) Frederick Street			57°09′00″N 2°05′37″W		C(S)	20402	Upload Photo
136-140 (Even Nos) King Street			57°09′04″N 2°05′38″W		B	20410	Upload Photo
13 And 15 Market Street			57°08′48″N 2°05′48″W		B	20445	Upload Photo
21 And 23 Market Street			57°08′47″N 2°05′47″W		B	20446	Upload Photo
43 And 45 Market Street, The Douglas Hotel			57°08′46″N 2°05′45″W		C(S)	20447	Upload Photo
162-166 (Even Nos) Market Street			57°08′34″N 2°05′35″W		B	20448	Upload Photo
Mount Street, 45			57°09′11″N 2°06′50″W		C(S)	20450	Upload Photo
Orchard Place, Orchard Cottage			57°09′42″N 2°06′02″W		C(S)	20453	Upload Photo
Queen Street, 17 Woodside			57°10′13″N 2°07′40″W		C(S)	20454	Upload Photo
1 Great Northern Road, The Northern Hotel			57°09′44″N 2°07′00″W		A	20331	Upload another image
Guild Street And 1 Trinity Street, Tivoli Theatre			57°08′43″N 2°05′52″W		A	20333	Upload Photo
62, 62A And 62B Hamilton Place At Whitehall Road, Including Gatepiers And Boundary Walls			57°08′52″N 2°07′36″W		A	20334	Upload another image
94, 94A And 96 Hamilton Place, Including Gatepiers And Boundary Walls			57°08′50″N 2°07′45″W		A	20343	Upload another image
High Street, 31 (Formerly) Now 2 Douglas Place, Old Aberdeen			57°09′54″N 2°06′08″W		B	20352	Upload Photo
High Street, 39 (West Side) Old Aberdeen			57°09′55″N 2°06′08″W		C(S)	20354	Upload Photo
High Street, 41 (West Side) And 2 Mackenzie Place, Old Aberdeen			57°09′55″N 2°06′08″W		B	20355	Upload Photo
High Street, 107 (West Side) Old Aberdeen			57°10′00″N 2°06′09″W		B	20365	Upload Photo
133-141 (Odd Nos) King Street			57°09′04″N 2°05′39″W		C(S)	20390	Upload Photo
16 And 18 King Street			57°08′55″N 2°05′36″W		C(S)	20396	Upload Photo
Don Street, (N.W. Side) "The Chapter House" "Cruickshanks Lodgings"			57°10′39″N 2°06′02″W		A	20299	Upload another image
Footdee, North Square, Mission Hall			57°08′38″N 2°04′19″W		C(S)	20315	Upload Photo
College Bounds, 32 (East Side) Old Aberdeen			57°09′45″N 2°06′06″W		B	20231	Upload Photo
Dee Place, 7-11 (Odd Nos)			57°08′31″N 2°06′09″W		B	20254	Upload Photo
Dee Place, 18			57°08′31″N 2°06′11″W		B	20257	Upload Photo
Dee Street, 41			57°08′36″N 2°06′12″W		C(S)	20259	Upload Photo
Dee Street, 59, 61			57°08′34″N 2°06′11″W		C(S)	20261	Upload Photo
Old Aberdeen, 15 Don Street (West Side)			57°10′03″N 2°06′07″W		B	20272	Upload Photo
Don Street, 17 (West Side) Old Aberdeen			57°10′03″N 2°06′07″W		B	20273	Upload Photo
Don Street, 55 (West Side) The Dower House, Old Aberdeen			57°10′06″N 2°06′01″W		B	20282	Upload Photo
Don Street, 40-44 (Even Nos) (East Side) Old Aberdeen			57°10′05″N 2°06′03″W		C(S)	20291	Upload Photo
Don Street, 46, 48 (East Side) Don House, Old Aberdeen			57°10′05″N 2°06′01″W		B	20292	Upload Photo
12 And 13 Castle Street			57°08′55″N 2°05′34″W		C(S)	20164	Upload Photo
14, 15 And 16 Castle Street			57°08′55″N 2°05′34″W		C(S)	20165	Upload Photo
Chanonry 2 (East Side) Boundary Wall			57°10′03″N 2°06′08″W		B	20179	Upload Photo
Chanonry, 5 (East Side) Old Aberdeen			57°10′04″N 2°06′09″W		B	20182	Upload Photo
Chanonry, 11 Boundary Wall			57°10′09″N 2°06′15″W		B	20189	Upload Photo
Chanonry, 13 Chanonry Lodge, Old Aberdeen			57°10′08″N 2°06′09″W		B	20192	Upload Photo
College Bounds, 7 (West Side) Old Aberdeen			57°09′43″N 2°06′06″W		B	20209	Upload Photo
29 Albyn Place, Including Gatepiers And Boundary Walls			57°08′34″N 2°07′18″W		B	20122	Upload Photo
130 Blenheim Place (Former Fountainhall House), Including Gates, Gatepiers And Boundary Walls			57°08′48″N 2°07′36″W		C(S)	20134	Upload Photo
Bon Accord Street, 51-57 (Odd Nos) (Back Properties At 59, 61 Excluded But Including Close Within 57)			57°08′34″N 2°06′19″W		C(S)	20140	Upload Photo
Bon Accord Street, 50-54 (Even Nos)			57°08′32″N 2°06′19″W		C(S)	20146	Upload Photo
Broad Street, Provost Skene's House, Including Archway And South Building			57°08′54″N 2°05′51″W		A	20156	Upload another image See more images
King's College New Building, High Street And Sacrist's House, 24 High Street			57°09′54″N 2°06′06″W		B	20093	Upload another image
70 Prospect Terrace, Old Ferryhill House, Including Gatepiers And Boundary Walls			57°08′07″N 2°05′58″W		B	20101	Upload Photo
Summerhill House Gatepiers On Anderson Drive North			57°08′49″N 2°08′56″W		B	20106	Upload Photo
Woodside House Off Mugiemoss Road			57°10′38″N 2°08′35″W		B	20110	Upload Photo
Market Cross Of Old Aberdeen, Within Forecourt Of Lecture Hall Of Geography Departments, High Street			57°09′59″N 2°06′09″W		B	20000	Upload Photo
Albert, Prince, Statue, Union Terrace			57°08′51″N 2°06′18″W		B	20001	Upload Photo
Cornhill Road, Royal Cornhill Hospital, Forbes Of Newe Obelisk			57°09′19″N 2°07′05″W		C(S)	20006	Upload Photo
March Stone No. 51 At Top Of Deer Road And West Corner Of Clifton Road Opposite Woodside School			57°10′15″N 2°07′48″W		B	20031	Upload Photo
March Stone No. 53, At Junction Of Hilton Road And Hilton Drive			57°10′01″N 2°07′48″W		B	20033	Upload Photo
March Stone No. 62, Near Junction Of St. Peter Street And Spital			57°09′26″N 2°05′56″W		B	20042	Upload Photo
March Stone No. 65, At Junction Of Golf Road And Seaton Place			57°10′04″N 2°05′08″W		B	20045	Upload Photo
Duthie Park, Hygeia Statue			57°07′53″N 2°06′05″W		B	20057	Upload another image See more images
Great Western Road And Nellfield Place, Nellfield Cemetery, Including 27 Great Western Road, Gates, Gatepiers And Cemetery Walls			57°08′21″N 2°06′57″W		C(S)	20058	Upload Photo
Hazlehead Park, Lodge, Hazlehead Avenue			57°08′24″N 2°10′26″W		B	20059	Upload Photo
Bridge Of Don, King Street			57°10′32″N 2°05′26″W		B	20069	Upload Photo
Denburn Viaduct Over Lower Denburn Valley			57°08′52″N 2°06′14″W		B	20075	Upload Photo
Union Street Viaduct			57°08′45″N 2°06′05″W		B	20077	Upload Photo
Little Belmont Street, Former Old Town's School			57°08′50″N 2°06′04″W		A	20082	Upload Photo
All Saints' (Episcopal) Church, Smithield Road, Hilton			57°10′11″N 2°07′46″W		B	19935	Upload Photo
Broad Street And Queen Street, Greyfriars John Knox Church			57°08′55″N 2°05′46″W		A	19941	Upload another image See more images
St. John's Episcopal Church, St. John's Place And Crown Terrace			57°08′36″N 2°06′04″W		B	19956	Upload Photo
Gallowgate, St Margaret Of Scotland (Episcopal) Church, Including Rectory And Boundary Wall			57°09′05″N 2°05′51″W		B	19960	Upload Photo
Union Street, Back Wynd, Schoolhill And Correction Wynd, The Kirk Of St Nicholas Uniting (Church Of Scotland And United Reformed)			57°08′51″N 2°05′57″W		A	19966	Upload another image
St. Mark's Church (C. Of S.) Rosemount Viaduct			57°08′53″N 2°06′19″W		B	19974	Upload Photo
25 Union Terrace			57°08′49″N 2°06′19″W		B	19981	Upload another image
Duthie Park, Footbridge Over Upper Lake			57°07′45″N 2°06′19″W		B	46780	Upload another image
Duthie Park, Gordon Highlanders Celtic Cross Memorial			57°07′54″N 2°06′10″W		C(S)	46782	Upload another image See more images
Duthie Park, Taylor Well			57°07′53″N 2°06′17″W		C(S)	46784	Upload another image See more images
Richmondhill Place, Richmondhill House, Including Gatepiers And Boundary Walls			57°08′53″N 2°08′04″W		C(S)	46996	Upload Photo
Urquhart Road, City Hospital, Including Administration Block, East And West Pavilions, North Lodge, East Lodge, Gatepiers, Boundary Walls And Railings			57°09′15″N 2°05′10″W		C(S)	47352	Upload Photo
21 And 23 Belgrave Terrace, Including Boundary Walls			57°08′52″N 2°07′06″W		C(S)	47453	Upload Photo
14 Hamilton Place, Including Boundary Walls			57°08′55″N 2°07′25″W		C(S)	47487	Upload Photo
47 King's Gate, Northsound Radio, Including Gatepiers And Boundary Walls			57°08′49″N 2°08′06″W		C(S)	47491	Upload Photo
Skene Street And Esslemont Avenue, Aberdeen Grammar School, French School (Formerly Westfield School)			57°08′52″N 2°06′54″W		C(S)	47492	Upload Photo
1 Alford Place (Formerly 2-6 Holburn Street)			57°08′34″N 2°06′44″W		C(S)	47916	Upload Photo
Torry, 82-84 Sinclair Road, John Ross Junior, Smoke House			57°08′17″N 2°04′55″W		B	50621	Upload Photo
49 Carmelite Street, Former Warehouse			57°08′43″N 2°05′54″W		C(S)	50933	Upload Photo
Footdee, No 2 North Square			57°08′38″N 2°04′20″W		C(S)	50937	Upload Photo
73-77 (Odd Nos) Union Street, Topshop Topman			57°08′48″N 2°05′51″W		C(S)	50957	Upload Photo
12 And 14 Virginia Street And 16 Shore Lane			57°08′49″N 2°05′30″W		C(S)	50961	Upload Photo
75 Waterloo Quay, Voyager House			57°08′44″N 2°04′58″W		C(S)	50962	Upload Photo
Maberly Street, Broadford Works With Returns To Ann Street And Hutcheon Street			57°09′11″N 2°06′29″W		A	43908	Upload another image See more images
37 And 39 Rubislaw Den South, Including Gatepiers And Boundary Walls			57°08′32″N 2°08′18″W		C(S)	20794	Upload Photo
4 And 6 Rubislaw Den South (Rear Of), Spademill Bridge Over North Burn Of Rubislaw			57°08′35″N 2°08′07″W		C(S)	20796	Upload Photo
10 Rubislaw Den South, Including Gatepiers And Boundary Walls			57°08′35″N 2°08′09″W		C(S)	20799	Upload Photo
28 Rubislaw Den South, Including Gatepiers And Boundary Walls			57°08′34″N 2°08′18″W		B	20805	Upload Photo
62 And 62A Rubislaw Den South, Including Gatepiers And Boundary Walls			57°08′33″N 2°08′37″W		C(S)	20818	Upload Photo
64 Rubislaw Den South, Including Gatepiers And Boundary Walls			57°08′33″N 2°08′40″W		B	20819	Upload Photo
68 And 68A Rubislaw Den South, Including Gatepiers And Boundary Walls			57°08′33″N 2°08′42″W		C(S)	20821	Upload Photo
Queen's Road, Woodend Hospital, East And West Lodges, Former Probationary Wards, Piers And Quadrants			57°08′40″N 2°10′22″W		B	20831	Upload Photo
55 Queen's Road, Hamilton School, Including Gatepiers And Boundary Walls			57°08′27″N 2°08′09″W		B	20730	Upload Photo
40 And 42 Queen's Road, Including Gatepiers And Boundary Walls			57°08′31″N 2°08′04″W		B	20739	Upload Photo
60 Queen's Road, Including Gatepiers And Boundary Walls			57°08′29″N 2°08′11″W		B	20743	Upload Photo
64 Queen's Road, Including Gatepiers And Boundary Walls			57°08′29″N 2°08′12″W		B	20745	Upload Photo
96 Queen's Road At Anderson Drive, Earls Court Hotel, Including Gatepiers, Boundary Walls And Railings			57°08′25″N 2°08′30″W		B	20754	Upload Photo
8 And 10 Rubislaw Den North, Including Boundary Walls			57°08′42″N 2°08′11″W		C(S)	20769	Upload Photo
14 And 16 Rubislaw Den North, Including Gatepiers And Boundary Walls			57°08′42″N 2°08′14″W		C(S)	20771	Upload Photo
54 Rubislaw Den North, Including Gatepiers And Boundary Walls			57°08′41″N 2°08′26″W		C(S)	20778	Upload Photo
395 Hardgate, Outseats House, Including Gatepiers And Boundary Walls			57°07′49″N 2°06′51″W		C(S)	20641	Upload Photo
Warehouse, Broadford Firehose And Canvas Works Maberley Street			57°09′06″N 2°06′28″W		B	20648	Upload Photo

== Key ==
The scheme for classifying buildings in Scotland is:

- Category A: "buildings of national or international importance, either architectural or historic; or fine, little-altered examples of some particular period, style or building type."
- Category B: "buildings of regional or more than local importance; or major examples of some particular period, style or building type, which may have been altered."
- Category C: "buildings of local importance; lesser examples of any period, style, or building type, as originally constructed or moderately altered; and simple traditional buildings which group well with other listed buildings."

In March 2016 there were 47,288 listed buildings in Scotland. Of these, 8% were Category A, and 50% were Category B, with the remaining 42% being Category C.

== See also ==
- List of listed buildings in Aberdeen
