= List of listed buildings in Aberdeen/3 =

This is a list of listed buildings in Aberdeen, Scotland.

== List ==
Name	Location	Date listed	Grid ref. (Note: Sometimes known as OSGB36, the grid reference (where provided) is based on the British national grid reference system used by the Ordnance Survey. • "Guide to National Grid". Ordnance Survey. • "Get-a-map". Ordnance Survey.)	Geo-coordinates	Notes	LB number (Note: Historic Environment Scotland assign a unique alphanumeric identifier to each designated site in Scotland, for listed buildings this always begins with "LB", for example "LB12345".)	Image
7 Alford Place, Including Boundary Walls				57°08′35″N 2°06′48″W	Category C(S)	47451	Upload Photo
4 And 6 Hamilton Place At Westfield Road, Including Boundary Walls				57°08′55″N 2°07′23″W	Category C(S)	47485	Upload Photo
32 Hamilton Place, Including Boundary Walls				57°08′54″N 2°07′29″W	Category C(S)	47489	Upload Photo
30-56 And 56A (Even Numbers) Victoria Street, Including Letter Box And Boundary Wall				57°08′42″N 2°06′55″W	Category B	47499	Upload Photo
6 And 8 Westfield Terrace, Including Boundary Walls And Gates				57°08′51″N 2°07′17″W	Category C(S)	47500	Upload Photo
24 Albyn Place At Albyn Grove, Albyn Hospital, Including Gatepiers And Boundary Walls				57°08′33″N 2°07′08″W	Category C(S)	47913	Upload Photo
35 And 36 Albyn Place, Including Gatepiers And Boundary Walls				57°08′34″N 2°07′25″W	Category C(S)	47914	Upload Photo
6A Raik Road, Smoke House				57°08′26″N 2°05′37″W	Category C(S)	50219	Upload Photo
Clarence Street And Limestreet Warehouse At Corner				57°08′45″N 2°05′00″W	Category C(S)	50934	Upload Photo
Footdee, Pocra Quay, Navigation Control Centre (Former Pilot House)				57°08′32″N 2°04′12″W	Category C(S)	50941	Upload Photo
Footdee, No 26 South Square				57°08′35″N 2°04′18″W	Category C(S)	50943	Upload Photo
119-125 (Odd Nos) George Street				57°08′59″N 2°06′06″W	Category C(S)	50946	Upload Photo
11-23 (Odd Nos) King Street				57°08′55″N 2°05′38″W	Category B	50949	Upload Photo
8 And 10 King Street				57°08′55″N 2°05′35″W	Category B	50950	Upload Photo
50 Marischal Street, Elim Pentecostal Church				57°08′48″N 2°05′32″W	Category C(S)	50951	Upload Photo
52A Market Street And 2 Guild Street				57°08′44″N 2°05′46″W	Category C(S)	50952	Upload Photo
6 Regent Road, United House				57°08′39″N 2°05′25″W	Category C(S)	50954	Upload Photo
35 St Clement Street				57°08′47″N 2°04′53″W	Category C(S)	50955	Upload Photo
6-10 (Even Nos) Virginia Street And 5 And 7 Weigh-House Square, Shore Porters Society				57°08′48″N 2°05′35″W	Category B	50960	Upload Photo
York Street, York Place, Wellington Street And St Clement Street, Former Aberdeen Iron Works				57°08′45″N 2°04′46″W	Category C(S)	50963	Upload Photo
Cranford Road, Cranford House, Including Lodge, Gatepiers And Boundary Wall				57°07′45″N 2°07′59″W	Category C(S)	43849	Upload Photo
74 Rubislaw Den North, Including Gatepiers And Boundary Walls				57°08′39″N 2°08′35″W	Category C(S)	20786	Upload Photo
18 And 18A Rubislaw Den South, Including Gatepiers And Boundary Walls				57°08′35″N 2°08′13″W	Category C(S)	20800	Upload Photo
24 Rubislaw Den South, Including Ancillary Structure, Gatepiers And Boundary Walls				57°08′34″N 2°08′16″W	Category B	20803	Upload Photo
26 Rubislaw Den South, Including Gatepiers And Boundary Walls				57°08′34″N 2°08′17″W	Category B	20804	Upload Photo
42 Rubislaw Den South, Marchmont, Including Balustrading, Gatepiers And Boundary Walls				57°08′34″N 2°08′26″W	Category C(S)	20810	Upload Photo
60 And 60A Rubislaw Den South, Including Gatepiers And Boundary Walls				57°08′33″N 2°08′36″W	Category C(S)	20817	Upload Photo
70 Rubislaw Den South, Dunrobin, Including Gatepiers And Boundary Walls				57°08′32″N 2°08′43″W	Category C(S)	20822	Upload Photo
9 And 11 Forest Road, Including Gatepiers And Boundary Walls				57°08′34″N 2°07′59″W	Category C(S)	20692	Upload Photo
64 Forest Road At Morningfield Road, Including Gates, Gatepiers And Boundary Walls				57°08′46″N 2°08′11″W	Category C(S)	20706	Upload Photo
3 Queen's Cross At St Swithin Street And Queen's Road, Bishop's House Adjoining St Joseph's Roman Catholic Primary School, Including Addition To E With Chapel				57°08′33″N 2°07′41″W	Category B	20707	Upload Photo
7 Queen's Road, Including Gatepiers And Boundary Walls				57°08′32″N 2°07′46″W	Category C(S)	20711	Upload Photo
23 Queen's Road At Queen's Gate And Forest Avenue, Albyn School For Girls, Including Gatepiers And Boundary Walls				57°08′30″N 2°07′55″W	Category B	20719	Upload Photo
59 Queen's Road, Including Gatepiers And Boundary Walls				57°08′27″N 2°08′11″W	Category C(S)	20731	Upload Photo
8 Queen's Road, Including Gatepiers And Boundary Walls				57°08′34″N 2°07′49″W	Category C(S)	20735	Upload Photo
15 Rubislaw Den North, Glenburn Lodge, Including Gatepiers And Boundary Walls				57°08′39″N 2°08′22″W	Category C(S)	20765	Upload Photo
17 Rubislaw Den North, Cramond House, Including Ancillary Structure, Gatepiers And Boundary Walls				57°08′39″N 2°08′24″W	Category B	20766	Upload Photo
90 Queen's Road, Including Gatepiers And Boundary Walls				57°08′26″N 2°08′27″W	Category B	20637	Upload Photo
14 Exchange Street				57°08′45″N 2°05′51″W	Category C(S)	20660	Upload Photo
9 Queen's Road, Including Gatepiers And Boundary Walls				57°08′32″N 2°07′47″W	Category B	20671	Upload Photo
1-7 (Odd Numbers) Polmuir Road, Including Boundary Walls				57°08′12″N 2°06′15″W	Category C(S)	20613	Upload Photo
36 Regent Quay, Regent House				57°08′48″N 2°05′27″W	Category B	20618	Upload Photo
11, 11A Dee Street				57°08′40″N 2°06′15″W	Category C(S)	20621	Upload Photo
West Church Of St Andrew (The Langstane Kirk) And Church Hall, Union Street And Langstane Place				57°08′38″N 2°06′24″W	Category B	20622	Upload Photo
63 Hamilton Place At Whitehall Road, Including Gates, Gatepiers And Boundary Walls				57°08′51″N 2°07′34″W	Category B	20626	Upload Photo
2A View Terrace, Including Gatepiers And Boundary Walls				57°09′01″N 2°06′55″W	Category B	20593	Upload Photo
47 And 49 Waverley Place, Including Boundary Walls				57°08′38″N 2°06′59″W	Category C(S)	20595	Upload Photo
Union Street, 207-219 (Odd Numbers) Including The Grill				57°08′42″N 2°06′15″W	Category B	20532	Upload Photo
Union Street, 225, 227				57°08′41″N 2°06′18″W	Category B	20534	Upload Photo
Union Street, 229, 231				57°08′40″N 2°06′19″W	Category B	20535	Upload Photo
Union Street, 265-271 (Odd Nos)				57°08′39″N 2°06′22″W	Category C(S)	20539	Upload Photo
Union Street, 373-377 (Odd Nos)				57°08′37″N 2°06′29″W	Category C(S)	20541	Upload Photo
40 And 42 Union Street				57°08′51″N 2°05′46″W	Category B	20548	Upload Photo
52-58 (Even Nos) Union Street				57°08′50″N 2°05′50″W	Category C(S)	20551	Upload Photo
122 And A Half To 132 (Even Nos) Union Street				57°08′47″N 2°06′02″W	Category C(S)	20556	Upload Photo
Union Street, 166-172 (Even Nos)				57°08′43″N 2°06′16″W	Category C(S)	20564	Upload Photo
Union Street, 222 And 224				57°08′41″N 2°06′23″W	Category C(S)	20569	Upload Photo
16 And 18 Upperkirkgate				57°08′56″N 2°05′54″W	Category C(S)	20579	Upload Photo
7-11 (Odd Numbers) Victoria Street, Including Boundary Walls				57°08′36″N 2°06′48″W	Category C(S)	20587	Upload Photo
17 Victoria Street, Including Boundary Wall				57°08′38″N 2°06′48″W	Category C(S)	20589	Upload Photo
19 Victoria Street, Including Boundary Wall				57°08′39″N 2°06′49″W	Category C(S)	20590	Upload Photo
North Silver Street 20 And 43 Diamond Street				57°08′49″N 2°06′21″W	Category B	20496	Upload Photo
North Silver Street, 22				57°08′50″N 2°06′22″W	Category B	20498	Upload Photo
1-4 Skene Place (Inclusive)				57°08′50″N 2°06′41″W	Category B	20500	Upload Photo
Spital, 45				57°09′31″N 2°06′00″W	Category B	20508	Upload Photo
81-85 (Odd Nos) Union Street				57°08′48″N 2°05′52″W	Category C(S)	20522	Upload Photo
101-105 (Odd Nos) Union Street				57°08′47″N 2°05′55″W	Category C(S)	20525	Upload Photo
167, 169 Union Street And 2, 4 Bridge Street				57°08′43″N 2°06′09″W	Category C(S)	20528	Upload Photo
50-56 (Even Nos) King Street				57°08′59″N 2°05′36″W	Category C(S)	20401	Upload Photo
7 And 9 King's Gate, Including Boundary Walls				57°08′50″N 2°07′51″W	Category B	20414	Upload Photo
13, 13A And 15 King's Gate, Including Piers And Boundary Walls				57°08′50″N 2°07′55″W	Category C(S)	20415	Upload Photo
Mackie Place, 3				57°08′52″N 2°06′44″W	Category C(S)	20418	Upload Photo
23-27 (Odd Nos) Marischal Street				57°08′51″N 2°05′34″W	Category B	20426	Upload Photo
35-37A (Odd Nos) Marischal Street				57°08′50″N 2°05′33″W	Category B	20428	Upload Photo
41-45 (Odd Nos) Marischal Street				57°08′49″N 2°05′32″W	Category B	20429	Upload Photo
Marischal Street, 47				57°08′49″N 2°05′31″W	Category B	20430	Upload Photo
46 Marischal Street				57°08′48″N 2°05′32″W	Category B	20440	Upload Photo
9-11 (Odd Numbers) Rosebank Place, Including Railings				57°08′23″N 2°06′36″W	Category B	20469	Upload Photo
27 Rubislaw Den North (Formerly Rubislaw Den House And Gordon House), Including Folly, Terrace Walls, Gatepiers And Boundary Walls				57°08′36″N 2°08′35″W	Category B	20474	Upload Photo
72 Hamilton Place, Including Gatepiers, Boundary Walls And Provosts Lamps				57°08′51″N 2°07′39″W	Category A	20337	Upload another image
74 And 76 Hamilton Place, Including Gatepiers And Boundary Walls				57°08′51″N 2°07′40″W	Category A	20338	Upload another image
78 And 80 Hamilton Place, Including Gatepiers And Boundary Walls				57°08′51″N 2°07′40″W	Category A	20339	Upload another image
86, 86A, 88 And 88A Hamilton Place, Including Gatepiers And Boundary Walls				57°08′51″N 2°07′42″W	Category A	20341	Upload another image
High Street, 15. (West Side) Old Aberdeen				57°09′53″N 2°06′08″W	Category B	20347	Upload Photo
High Street, 22 (West Side) Old Aberdeen				57°09′53″N 2°06′08″W	Category B	20349	Upload Photo
High Street, 57-61 (Odd Nos) (West Side) Old Aberdeen				57°09′56″N 2°06′09″W	Category B	20357	Upload Photo
High Street, 91 (West Side) And 1 Blackburn Place Old Aberdeen				57°09′59″N 2°06′09″W	Category B	20362	Upload Photo
High Street, 111 And 113 Wall And Gate Pillars To 113				57°10′01″N 2°06′09″W	Category B	20367	Upload Photo
High Street, 86,88 (East Side) Old Aberdeen				57°09′59″N 2°06′08″W	Category B	20372	Upload Photo
High Street, 108, 110 Old Aberdeen				57°10′01″N 2°06′07″W	Category B	20378	Upload Photo
154 Hutcheon Street				57°09′14″N 2°06′40″W	Category B	20383	Upload Photo
7 And 9 King Street				57°08′54″N 2°05′37″W	Category B	20387	Upload Photo
143 And 145 King Street				57°09′04″N 2°05′40″W	Category C(S)	20391	Upload Photo
Don Street, 78, Boundary Walls				57°10′08″N 2°05′56″W	Category B	20296	Upload Photo
Don Street,120-122 (East Side)				57°10′13″N 2°05′49″W	Category C(S)	20297	Upload Photo
Don Street,124 (East Side)				57°10′13″N 2°05′49″W	Category C(S)	20298	Upload Photo
Dunbar Street, 11-14 (Inclusive)				57°10′03″N 2°06′01″W	Category B	20312	Upload Photo
George Street, 403-405				57°09′12″N 2°06′21″W	Category B	20320	Upload Photo
College Bounds, 2 (East Side) Old Aberdeen				57°09′42″N 2°06′04″W	Category B	20222	Upload Photo
College Bounds, 28 (East Side) Old Aberdeen				57°09′45″N 2°06′06″W	Category B	20230	Upload Photo
College Bounds, 40 (East Side) Old Aberdeen				57°09′46″N 2°06′06″W	Category B	20232	Upload Photo
College Bounds, 50, 52 (East Side) Old Aberdeen				57°09′49″N 2°06′06″W	Category B	20236	Upload Photo
Crown Street 89-105 (Odd Nos)				57°08′36″N 2°06′07″W	Category B	20244	Upload Photo
Dee Street, 70-78 (Even Nos)				57°08′32″N 2°06′12″W	Category B	20267	Upload Photo
11 And 12 Devanha Terrace, Including Boundary Walls And Railings Enclosing Garden Across Road Opposite Front Elevation				57°08′13″N 2°06′00″W	Category C(S)	20270	Upload Photo
13 And 14 Devanha Terrace, Including Boundary Walls And Railings Enclosing Garden Across Road Opposite Front Elevation				57°08′13″N 2°06′00″W	Category C(S)	20271	Upload Photo
Don Street, 21 (West Side) Old Aberdeen				57°10′04″N 2°06′07″W	Category C(S)	20275	Upload Photo
Don Street, 55 Chanonry Boundary Wall				57°10′07″N 2°06′00″W	Category B	20283	Upload Photo
Don Street, 69 (West Side) Old Aberdeen				57°10′07″N 2°05′58″W	Category B	20285	Upload Photo
Don Street, 36, 38 (East Side) Old Aberdeen				57°10′04″N 2°06′04″W	Category C(S)	20290	Upload Photo
9, 10 And 11 Castle Street				57°08′54″N 2°05′35″W	Category B	20163	Upload Photo
31-35 (Inclusive Nos) Castle Street				57°08′53″N 2°05′32″W	Category B	20168	Upload Photo
40, 41 And 41A Castle Street				57°08′53″N 2°05′33″W	Category C(S)	20169	Upload Photo
Chanonry, 8 (West Side) Old Aberdeen				57°10′07″N 2°06′12″W	Category B	20185	Upload Photo
46 Charlotte Street And Arched Gateway				57°09′04″N 2°06′16″W	Category C(S)	20202	Upload Photo
College Bounds, 19 (West Side) Old Aberdeen				57°09′45″N 2°06′07″W	Category B	20210	Upload Photo
College Bounds, 27 (West Side) Old Aberdeen				57°09′46″N 2°06′07″W	Category B	20214	Upload Photo
College Bounds, 33 (West Side) Old Aberdeen				57°09′46″N 2°06′07″W	Category B	20216	Upload Photo
College Bounds, 41 Boundary Wall				57°09′48″N 2°06′10″W	Category B	20218	Upload Photo
9 Albyn Place, Including Gatepiers And Boundary Walls				57°08′33″N 2°06′52″W	Category B	20116	Upload Photo
37, 37A Belmont Street				57°08′50″N 2°06′07″W	Category B	20130	Upload Photo
Bon Accord Street, 63-71 (Odd Nos)				57°08′33″N 2°06′18″W	Category C(S)	20141	Upload Photo
Bon Accord Street, 80,82				57°08′28″N 2°06′16″W	Category C(S)	20151	Upload Photo
Bon Accord Terrace, 26, 28 And 33 Hardgate				57°08′34″N 2°06′30″W	Category B	20152	Upload Photo
Bon Accord Terrace, 50 And 55 Hardgate				57°08′30″N 2°06′30″W	Category C(S)	20155	Upload Photo
2 Devanha Gardens West				57°08′09″N 2°06′10″W	Category B	20099	Upload Photo
Friendville Walled Gardens				57°07′57″N 2°08′09″W	Category B	20103	Upload Photo
Summerhill House, Anderson Drive North				57°08′51″N 2°09′00″W	Category B	20105	Upload Photo
Old Aberdeen, Tillydrone Road, Wallace's Tower (Benholm's Lodgings)				57°10′16″N 2°06′30″W	Category B	20107	Upload another image See more images
Cornhill Road, Royal Cornhill Hospital, Elmhill House				57°09′27″N 2°07′19″W	Category B	19984	Upload Photo
47-53 (Odd Nos) Market Street				57°08′45″N 2°05′45″W	Category C(S)	19989	Upload Photo
Public Transport Department King Street				57°09′28″N 2°05′46″W	Category C(S)	19998	Upload Photo
Burns, Robert Statue, Union Terrace				57°08′47″N 2°06′13″W	Category B	20002	Upload another image See more images
Elphinstone, Bishop, Memorial, King's College Grounds, College Bounds, Old Aberdeen				57°09′51″N 2°06′06″W	Category A	20005	Upload another image See more images
Schoolhill, Statue Of General Gordon Of Khartoum				57°08′53″N 2°06′07″W	Category B	20009	Upload another image See more images
319-325 (Even Numbers) Great Western Road, March Stone Number 5 Against Rear Boundary Wall				57°08′06″N 2°07′30″W	Category C(S)	20018	Upload Photo
March Stone No. 6, Within The Back Garden Of No. 11 Hammerfield Avenue				57°07′55″N 2°08′00″W	Category B	20019	Upload Photo
March Stone No. 45 On The Farm Of Newton Of Auchmill West Of, And At The Bend Of The Road Leading To, The Steading				57°10′22″N 2°10′31″W	Category B	20025	Upload Photo
March Stone No. 49, On The West Side Of The Scatter Burn Where It Joins The Don Near Persley Bridge				57°10′33″N 2°09′05″W	Category B	20029	Upload Photo
March Stone No. 56, Beside No. 41 Clifton Road Near The Junction Of That Road And Great Northern Road				57°09′45″N 2°07′02″W	Category B	20036	Upload Photo
March Stone No. 59, At Junction Of Elmbank Terrace, Froghall Terrace And Canal Road				57°09′26″N 2°06′20″W	Category B	20039	Upload another image
March Stone No. 61, In Front Garden Of No. 37 King's Crescent				57°09′25″N 2°05′59″W	Category B	20041	Upload Photo
Chanonry Well, At St. Machar's Cathedral Gateway, Old Aberdeen				57°10′09″N 2°06′11″W	Category B	20052	Upload Photo
Firhill Well, "The Gibberie Wallie", St Machar Sports Centre, Sunnyside Road				57°09′44″N 2°06′18″W	Category B	20053	Upload another image
Union Terrace Gardens, Arcades, Balustrades And Public Toilets				57°08′45″N 2°06′08″W	Category B	20066	Upload Photo
Rosemount Viaduct Over Upper Denburn Valley				57°08′53″N 2°06′31″W	Category B	20076	Upload Photo
Mid Stocket Road And Beechgrove Avenue, Beechgrove Church (Church Of Scotland), Including Gatepiers And Boundary Walls				57°08′58″N 2°07′42″W	Category B	19936	Upload Photo

== Key ==
The scheme for classifying buildings in Scotland is:

- Category A: "buildings of national or international importance, either architectural or historic; or fine, little-altered examples of some particular period, style or building type."
- Category B: "buildings of regional or more than local importance; or major examples of some particular period, style or building type, which may have been altered."
- Category C: "buildings of local importance; lesser examples of any period, style, or building type, as originally constructed or moderately altered; and simple traditional buildings which group well with other listed buildings."

In March 2016 there were 47,288 listed buildings in Scotland. Of these, 8% were Category A, and 50% were Category B, with the remaining 42% being Category C.

== See also ==
- List of listed buildings in Aberdeen
