= List of listed buildings in Peterculter =

This is a list of listed buildings in the parish of Peterculter in Aberdeen, Scotland.

== List ==
Name	Location	Date listed	Grid ref. (Note: Sometimes known as OSGB36, the grid reference (where provided) is based on the British national grid reference system used by the Ordnance Survey. • "Guide to National Grid". Ordnance Survey. • "Get-a-map". Ordnance Survey.)	Geo-coordinates	Notes	LB number (Note: Historic Environment Scotland assign a unique alphanumeric identifier to each designated site in Scotland, for listed buildings this always begins with "LB", for example "LB12345".)	Image
Parish Church of St. Peter Peterculter				57°05′41″N 2°15′47″W	Category C(S)	19753	Upload another image See more images
Cults House, Garden Wall				57°07′03″N 2°10′55″W	Category B	15771	Upload Photo
Mill Of Cults, Millden Road				57°07′04″N 2°10′23″W	Category C(S)	15772	Upload another image
St. Peter's Manse Peterculter				57°05′40″N 2°15′51″W	Category B	15713	Upload another image
Kennerty House				57°05′42″N 2°16′34″W	Category B	15716	Upload Photo
Upper Anguston, Farmhouse				57°06′38″N 2°19′23″W	Category C(S)	15722	Upload Photo
Murtle House				57°06′14″N 2°12′42″W	Category B	15730	Upload Photo
St. Devenick's Episcopal Church, Bieldside				57°06′47″N 2°11′48″W	Category B	19756	Upload another image
Cults Old School				57°06′57″N 2°10′53″W	Category C(S)	15770	Upload Photo
Culter House Walled Garden, Gazebo, Dovecot and Gatepiers				57°06′10″N 2°15′27″W	Category B	15715	Upload Photo
Lower Kennerty Mill				57°05′39″N 2°16′10″W	Category C(S)	15718	Upload another image
Peterculter Old Free Church, Contlaw				57°06′55″N 2°15′46″W	Category C(S)	15723	Upload Photo
March Stone No. 24 to the West of the Farm Buildings of North Westfield				57°07′34″N 2°15′33″W	Category B	15727	Upload Photo
Ellengowan				57°07′34″N 2°11′29″W	Category B	15735	Upload Photo
Kaim House				57°07′06″N 2°08′23″W	Category B	15782	Upload another image
Mill Of Murtle				57°06′32″N 2°12′44″W	Category C(S)	15689	Upload Photo
Ladyhill House				57°07′24″N 2°12′36″W	Category B	15693	Upload Photo
Morrison's Bridge (The Shakkin' Briggie) Over River Dee				57°06′52″N 2°10′14″W	Category A	15733	Upload another image See more images
Greenridge (Formerly Morkeu House) Cults				57°07′27″N 2°10′27″W	Category B	15734	Upload Photo
March Stone No. 17 About 150 Yards West of the Belt of Trees Containing No. 16 Near a Cairn of Field Gatherings				57°07′08″N 2°13′09″W	Category B	15741	Upload Photo
March Stone No. 18 at the Head of Den of Murtle on and to N. of Farm of Hilton				57°07′12″N 2°13′37″W	Category B	15742	Upload Photo
March Stone No. 20 on the Line Of the Same Dyke as No. 19 to the West				57°07′14″N 2°14′13″W	Category B	15744	Upload Photo
Countesswells House Doocot				57°07′43″N 2°12′45″W	Category C(S)	15748	Upload Photo
Cults, Pitfodels Station Road, Former Station Building				57°07′14″N 2°09′22″W	Category C(S)	51183	Upload Photo
Windmill, Drumgarth, Garthdee Road				57°07′03″N 2°09′19″W	Category C(S)	15779	Upload another image
Norwood, Garthdee Road				57°07′03″N 2°09′02″W	Category B	15780	Upload Photo
Milton Of Murtle				57°06′33″N 2°12′43″W	Category C(S)	15690	Upload Photo
Fairview, Inchagarth Road				57°06′55″N 2°10′14″W	Category B	15732	Upload Photo
March Stone No. 14 on the Farm of Hillhead of Cults N.W. of the Farmbuildings at the Edge of a Field				57°07′09″N 2°11′50″W	Category B	15738	Upload Photo
Garthdee Road, Garthdee House (Scott Sutherland School of Architecture), Including Terrace Walls and Steps, East and West Lodges				57°07′08″N 2°08′35″W	Category B	47908	Upload another image
Inchgarth House Including Garden Terrace, Inchgarth Road, Aberdeen				57°07′05″N 2°09′27″W	Category C(S)	15711	Upload another image
Waulkmill Bridge Over Culter Burn				57°06′13″N 2°17′25″W	Category B	15720	Upload another image
Nether Anguston, Farmhouse				57°06′19″N 2°18′51″W	Category B	15721	Upload Photo
March Stone No. 23 at Top of Beans Hill				57°07′21″N 2°15′17″W	Category B	15726	Upload Photo
Cults House				57°07′03″N 2°10′58″W	Category B	15731	Upload Photo
March Stone No. 12 on Craigton Road Below Cults Dam				57°07′04″N 2°11′00″W	Category B	15736	Upload Photo
March Stone No. 13 in a Quarry N.W. of Mains of Cults				57°07′14″N 2°11′30″W	Category B	15737	Upload Photo
March Stone No. 15 in a Field South of Bellyswells Farm and Beside 4 Dressed Stones Marked 1-4 Which Mark the Springs of Cults Water Supply				57°07′08″N 2°12′27″W	Category B	15739	Upload another image
March Stone No. 21. on a Knoll West of The Farm of Westfield				57°07′17″N 2°14′39″W	Category B	15745	Upload Photo
Countesswells House				57°07′45″N 2°12′54″W	Category B	15747	Upload Photo
Murtleden, Inchyra Road				57°06′51″N 2°13′16″W	Category B	15692	Upload Photo
Bieldside House Including Railing and Gates				57°06′47″N 2°11′30″W	Category B	15695	Upload Photo
Mill of Brotherfield, Bridge Over Brodiach Burn at Easter Ord				57°07′58″N 2°16′31″W	Category C(S)	15725	Upload Photo
March Stone No. 26 at the Confluence of the Ord or Brodiach Burn With the Rotten or Silver Burn				57°07′44″N 2°16′37″W	Category B	15729	Upload Photo
March Stone No. 19 at the N.W. Head of the Den of Murtle on the Farm of West Field at the Side of a Field				57°07′14″N 2°14′04″W	Category B	15743	Upload Photo
March Stone No. 22 on Another Knoll West of the Farm of Westfield				57°07′18″N 2°14′48″W	Category B	15746	Upload Photo
Murtle Sawmill (Don Contractors Ltd.)				57°06′23″N 2°12′45″W	Category C(S)	19754	Upload Photo
March Stone No. 27 South of Easter Ord and South-West of a Footbridge				57°07′47″N 2°16′37″W	Category B	15783	Upload Photo
Murtle Cottage, 151 Deeside Road, Bieldside				57°06′39″N 2°12′24″W	Category B	15691	Upload Photo
Ladyhill House Lodge				57°07′23″N 2°12′34″W	Category B	15694	Upload another image
St. Peter's Churchyard, Peterculter				57°05′41″N 2°15′47″W	Category C(S)	15712	Upload another image
Upper Kennerty Mills				57°05′41″N 2°16′20″W	Category B	15717	Upload Photo
March Stone No. 16 in a Belt of Trees North of the Gardeners Cottage at Dalmuinzie Adjoining Foggreton Muir				57°07′07″N 2°12′53″W	Category B	15740	Upload Photo
North Deeside Road at Craigton Crescent, Peterculter Parish Church (Church of Scotland), Including Boundary Walls				57°05′48″N 2°15′53″W	Category C(S)	47267	Upload another image
Cults West Church				57°06′52″N 2°11′21″W	Category B	15769	Upload another image
Culter House (St. Margaret's School for Girls Boarding House)				57°06′10″N 2°15′28″W	Category A	15714	Upload another image
Kennerty Bridge				57°05′44″N 2°16′22″W	Category B	15719	Upload another image See more images
Mill of Brotherfield				57°07′58″N 2°16′30″W	Category C(S)	15724	Upload Photo
March Stone No. 25 on the S.E. Face of Brunt Hill Near the Rotten or Silver Burn				57°07′40″N 2°15′43″W	Category B	15728	Upload Photo
Binghill House, Milltimber				57°06′46″N 2°14′13″W	Category C(S)	52313	Upload Photo
East Lodge Including Gatepiers, Robert Gordon University, Garthdee Road, Aberdeen				57°07′08″N 2°08′35″W	Category C(S)	52364	Upload another image
West Lodge Including Gatepiers and Rear Outbuilding and Excluding Former Ancillary Building to West, Robert Gordon University, Garthdee Road, Aberdeen				57°07′10″N 2°08′59″W	Category C(S)	52365	Upload another image
Former Aberdeen Convalescent Hospital including terrace, and excluding exterior metal stairs, former classroom block, sports hall and nursery building, Craigton Road, Cults, Aberdeen				57°07′33″N 2°10′54″W	Category C(S)	52535	Upload Photo

== Key ==
The scheme for classifying buildings in Scotland is:

- Category A: "buildings of national or international importance, either architectural or historic; or fine, little-altered examples of some particular period, style or building type."
- Category B: "buildings of regional or more than local importance; or major examples of some particular period, style or building type, which may have been altered."
- Category C: "buildings of local importance; lesser examples of any period, style, or building type, as originally constructed or moderately altered; and simple traditional buildings which group well with other listed buildings."

In March 2016 there were 47,288 listed buildings in Scotland. Of these, 8% were Category A, and 50% were Category B, with the remaining 42% being Category C.

== See also ==
- List of listed buildings in Aberdeen
