= List of listed buildings in Aberdeen/1 =

This is a list of listed buildings in Aberdeen, Scotland.

== List ==
Name	Location	Date listed	Grid ref. (Note: Sometimes known as OSGB36, the grid reference (where provided) is based on the British national grid reference system used by the Ordnance Survey. • "Guide to National Grid". Ordnance Survey. • "Get-a-map". Ordnance Survey.)	Geo-coordinates	Notes	LB number (Note: Historic Environment Scotland assign a unique alphanumeric identifier to each designated site in Scotland, for listed buildings this always begins with "LB", for example "LB12345".)	Image
54-71 (Inclusive Numbers) Springbank Terrace, Including Boundary Walls And Railings				57°08′25″N 2°06′20″W	Category C(S)	44958	Upload Photo
62 And 62A Rubislaw Den North, Including Gatepiers And Boundary Walls				57°08′40″N 2°08′30″W	Category B	20781	Upload Photo
64 Rubislaw Den North, Rostrevor, Including Gatepiers And Boundary Walls				57°08′40″N 2°08′31″W	Category B	20782	Upload Photo
23 And 25 Rubislaw Den South, Including Boundary Walls				57°08′33″N 2°08′14″W	Category C(S)	20790	Upload Photo
29 And 31 Rubislaw Den South, Including Gatepiers And Boundary Walls				57°08′32″N 2°08′15″W	Category C(S)	20792	Upload Photo
72 Rubislaw Den South, Duthie Lodge, Including Gatepiers And Boundary Walls				57°08′32″N 2°08′44″W	Category B	20823	Upload Photo
Broomhill Road, K6 Telephone Kiosk				57°07′42″N 2°07′42″W	Category B	20825	Upload Photo
Trinity Quay, 1-7 (Inclusive Nos) Trinity Buildings, Formerly Duthie's Warehouse				57°08′45″N 2°05′43″W	Category B	20832	Upload Photo
Granton Lodge, 8-14 Great Western Place, Granton Lodge, Including Boundary Walls, Gatepiers And Railings				57°08′24″N 2°07′01″W	Category B	20836	Upload Photo
39-41(Inc Nos) Union Terrace				57°08′51″N 2°06′21″W	Category B	20690	Upload Photo
13, 13A, 13B, 15, 17 And 19 Forest Road, Including Gatepiers And Boundary Walls				57°08′35″N 2°08′00″W	Category B	20693	Upload Photo
23, 25 And 27 Forest Road At Beaconsfield Place, Langley, Including Gatepiers And Boundary Walls				57°08′36″N 2°08′01″W	Category B	20694	Upload Photo
35 And 37 Forest Road, Including Gatepiers And Boundary Walls				57°08′40″N 2°08′04″W	Category C(S)	20697	Upload Photo
39 And 41 Forest Road, Including Gatepiers And Boundary Walls				57°08′41″N 2°08′04″W	Category C(S)	20698	Upload Photo
24 Forest Road, Including Gatepiers And Boundary Walls				57°08′37″N 2°08′05″W	Category B	20702	Upload Photo
26 Forest Road, Including Steps, Gatepiers And Boundary Walls				57°08′38″N 2°08′05″W	Category B	20703	Upload Photo
11 Queen's Road, Including Ancillary Structure, Gatepiers And Boundary Walls				57°08′31″N 2°07′48″W	Category B	20713	Upload Photo
3 Queen's Gate At Queen's Road And Forest Avenue, Including Gatepiers And Boundary Walls				57°08′29″N 2°07′59″W	Category B	20720	Upload Photo
35 Queen's Road, Including Gatepiers And Boundary Walls				57°08′28″N 2°08′03″W	Category B	20724	Upload Photo
37 And 39 Queen's Road, Including Gatepiers And Boundary Walls				57°08′28″N 2°08′04″W	Category C(S)	20725	Upload Photo
41, 41A, 43 And 43A Queen's Road, Including Gatepiers And Boundary Walls				57°08′28″N 2°08′05″W	Category C(S)	20726	Upload Photo
45, 45A, 47 And 47A Queen's Road, Including Gatepiers And Boundary Walls				57°08′28″N 2°08′06″W	Category C(S)	20727	Upload Photo
6 Queen's Road, Including Gatepiers And Boundary Walls				57°08′34″N 2°07′48″W	Category C(S)	20734	Upload Photo
46 And 48 Queen's Road, Including Gatepiers And Boundary Walls				57°08′30″N 2°08′06″W	Category B	20740	Upload Photo
62 Queen's Road, Including Gatepiers And Boundary Walls				57°08′29″N 2°08′12″W	Category C(S)	20744	Upload Photo
94 Queen's Road, Including Gatepiers And Boundary Walls				57°08′26″N 2°08′29″W	Category B	20753	Upload Photo
116 Queen's Road, Westholme				57°08′23″N 2°08′43″W	Category B	20759	Upload Photo
3 And 3A Rubislaw Den North, Gatepiers And Boundary Walls				57°08′39″N 2°08′08″W	Category C(S)	20760	Upload Photo
13 Rubislaw Den North, Glenburnie Park, Including Gatepiers And Boundary Walls				57°08′39″N 2°08′19″W	Category B	20764	Upload Photo
20 Rubislaw Den North, Including Gatepiers And Boundary Walls				57°08′42″N 2°08′16″W	Category C(S)	20773	Upload Photo
1-10 (Inclusive Numbers) Queen's Terrace, At Prince Arthur Street, Including Railings, Lamp Standards, And Balustrading, Gatepiers, Gates And Railings Enclosing Communal Garden To South				57°08′36″N 2°07′14″W	Category B	20633	Upload Photo
1-16 (Inclusive Numbers) Albyn Terrace, Including Gatepiers, Boundary Walls And Railings				57°08′36″N 2°07′26″W	Category B	20634	Upload Photo
8-26 (Even Nos) Schoolhill				57°08′53″N 2°06′00″W	Category B	20645	Upload Photo
46-70 (Even Nos) Schoolhill				57°08′53″N 2°06′04″W	Category B	20647	Upload Photo
264 And 266 Holburn Street, Including Boundary Walls				57°08′14″N 2°06′54″W	Category C(S)	20651	Upload Photo
39 The Green And 2 And 4 Carmelite Street				57°08′45″N 2°05′55″W	Category C(S)	20665	Upload Photo
41 And 43 The Green				57°08′45″N 2°05′56″W	Category C(S)	20666	Upload Photo
Guild Street Aberdeen Railway Station And Road Overbridge				57°08′38″N 2°05′54″W	Category A	20673	Upload another image See more images
Former Station Building At North East Corner Guild Street And College Street				57°08′39″N 2°06′02″W	Category B	20674	Upload Photo
12A-15 Correction Wynd				57°08′49″N 2°05′56″W	Category C(S)	20680	Upload Photo
2-18 (Even Numbers) Ferryhill Place, Including Gatepiers And Boundary Walls				57°08′14″N 2°06′10″W	Category B	20612	Upload Photo
16 Polmuir Road, Rotunda Lodge, Including Boundary Walls				57°08′08″N 2°06′17″W	Category C(S)	20614	Upload Photo
55-93 (Odd Numbers) Argyll Place, Including Boundary Walls				57°09′04″N 2°07′29″W	Category B	20624	Upload Photo
1-13 (Inclusive Numbers) Argyll Crescent, Including Gates, Gatepiers And Boundary Walls				57°09′10″N 2°07′33″W	Category B	20625	Upload Photo
20 And 22 Waverley Place, Prince Regent Hotel, Including Gatepiers And Boundary Walls				57°08′40″N 2°06′56″W	Category B	20596	Upload Photo
Wrights' And Coopers' Place (Houses 5 And 5A; Old Number 9)				57°09′59″N 2°06′05″W	Category B	20603	Upload Photo
1-29 (Odd Numbers) Caledonian Place, Including Boundary Walls				57°08′20″N 2°06′15″W	Category B	20606	Upload Photo
2-24 (Even Numbers) Caledonian Place, Including Boundary Walls				57°08′20″N 2°06′10″W	Category B	20607	Upload Photo
1 Abbotsford Lane, Woodbine Cottage, Including Boundary Walls				57°08′15″N 2°06′13″W	Category C(S)	20609	Upload Photo
1-6 (Inclusive Numbers) Marine Place, Including Gates, Gatepiers, Boundary Walls, Letter Box And Railings				57°08′13″N 2°06′04″W	Category B	20610	Upload Photo
3-15 (Odd Numbers) Ferryhill Place, Including Gatepiers And Boundary Walls				57°08′13″N 2°06′09″W	Category B	20611	Upload Photo
Union Street, 175-197 (Odd Nos)				57°08′42″N 2°06′12″W	Category B	20530	Upload Photo
Union Street, 221, 223				57°08′41″N 2°06′17″W	Category B	20533	Upload Photo
Union Street, 335-369 (Odd Nos)				57°08′38″N 2°06′25″W	Category C(S)	20540	Upload Photo
Union Street, 381-391 (Odd Nos)				57°08′37″N 2°06′30″W	Category B	20542	Upload Photo
78 And 80 Union Street, Royal Bank Of Scotland				57°08′49″N 2°05′54″W	Category B	20553	Upload Photo
Union Street, 148				57°08′44″N 2°06′11″W	Category C(S)	20558	Upload Photo
Union Street, 152				57°08′44″N 2°06′13″W	Category B	20560	Upload Photo
220 Union Street				57°08′41″N 2°06′23″W	Category C(S)	20568	Upload Photo
478-484 (Even Numbers) Union Street				57°08′36″N 2°06′41″W	Category C(S)	20572	Upload Photo
21-59 (Odd Numbers) Victoria Street, Including 53A Victoria Street And 181 Skene Street, Including Boundary Walls				57°08′43″N 2°06′53″W	Category B	20591	Upload Photo
18-28 (Even Numbers) And 18A Victoria Street And 2, 6, 8, 10 And 16 Waverley Place, Including Boundary Walls				57°08′38″N 2°06′50″W	Category B	20592	Upload Photo
1-26 (Inclusive Numbers) Rubislaw Terrace, At Rubislaw Place Including Railings, Lamp Standards, Ancillary Structures, And Balustrading, Gatepiers, Gates And Railings Enclosing Communal Garden To South				57°08′37″N 2°07′00″W	Category B	20476	Upload Photo
St. Mary's Place, 1-6 (Inclusive)				57°08′34″N 2°06′02″W	Category B	20482	Upload Photo
North Silver Street 17				57°08′49″N 2°06′22″W	Category C(S)	20487	Upload Photo
North Silver Street, 14, 16				57°08′49″N 2°06′21″W	Category B	20494	Upload Photo
Skene Terrace, 35				57°08′50″N 2°06′25″W	Category B	20501	Upload Photo
Skene Terrace, 42				57°08′51″N 2°06′27″W	Category B	20503	Upload Photo
1-15 (Inclusive Nos) Springbank Terrace And 121 Bon Accord Street				57°08′28″N 2°06′08″W	Category C(S)	20510	Upload Photo
Thom's Place, 8 High Street, Old Aberdeen				57°09′57″N 2°06′10″W	Category C(S)	20512	Upload Photo
5-21 (Odd Nos) Union Street And 1 And 2 Castle Street, Union Building				57°08′51″N 2°05′41″W	Category B	20514	Upload Photo
23-31 (Odd Nos) Union Street				57°08′50″N 2°05′43″W	Category C(S)	20515	Upload Photo
33-37 (Odd Nos) Union Street				57°08′50″N 2°05′44″W	Category C(S)	20516	Upload Photo
51 And 53 Union Street				57°08′49″N 2°05′47″W	Category C(S)	20518	Upload Photo
3-11 (Inclusive Numbers) Marine Terrace, Including Railings				57°08′17″N 2°06′06″W	Category B	20421	Upload Photo
17-21 (Odd Nos) Marischal Street				57°08′51″N 2°05′34″W	Category B	20425	Upload Photo
16-20 (Even Nos) Marischal Street				57°08′51″N 2°05′35″W	Category B	20434	Upload Photo
34, 34A Marischal Street				57°08′50″N 2°05′34″W	Category B	20437	Upload Photo
42, 42A Marischal Street				57°08′49″N 2°05′33″W	Category B	20438	Upload Photo
48 Marischal Street				57°08′48″N 2°05′32″W	Category B	20441	Upload Photo
2 Queen's Cross And 2 Fountainhall Road, Including Piers And Boundary Walls				57°08′37″N 2°07′37″W	Category B	20456	Upload Photo
50, 50A And 50B Queen's Road, Including Ancillary Structures, Gatepiers And Boundary Walls				57°08′30″N 2°08′07″W	Category A	20459	Upload another image See more images
Rosemount House, At 28 Rosemount Place				57°09′04″N 2°06′42″W	Category B	20470	Upload Photo
1-13 (Inclusive Numbers) Rosemount Square, At Leadside Road, South Mount Street, Richmond Street And Kintore Place				57°08′58″N 2°06′41″W	Category A	20471	Upload another image
1-27 (Odd Nos) Rosemount Viaduct And 53, 55 Skene Street				57°08′52″N 2°06′27″W	Category B	20472	Upload Photo
1-6 (Inclusive Numbers) Rubislaw Place And 21 And 23 Waverley Place, Including Gatepiers And Boundary Walls				57°08′37″N 2°06′54″W	Category B	20475	Upload Photo
Golden Square, 13, 14, 15				57°08′46″N 2°06′21″W	Category B	20326	Upload Photo
Golden Square, 19, 20, 21				57°08′44″N 2°06′20″W	Category B	20329	Upload Photo
High Street, 5. (West Side) Old Aberdeen				57°09′52″N 2°06′08″W	Category B	20345	Upload Photo
High Street 29 (Formerly) Now 1 Douglas Place Old Aberdeen				57°09′54″N 2°06′08″W	Category B	20351	Upload Photo
Huntly Street, 33-51 (Odd Nos)				57°08′43″N 2°06′27″W	Category C(S)	20381	Upload Photo
17, 19, 21 King's Crescent And 1 Jute Street				57°09′22″N 2°05′59″W	Category B	20385	Upload Photo
1-5 (Odd Nos) King Street				57°08′54″N 2°05′37″W	Category B	20386	Upload Photo
Don Street (N.W. Side) 1 Rocky Bank				57°10′39″N 2°06′01″W	Category B	20300	Upload Photo
Don Street, (N.W. Side) Balgownie Hall Mission (46 Aberdeen Scout Troop)				57°10′39″N 2°06′00″W	Category B	20302	Upload Photo
The Esplanade, Beach Ballroom				57°09′19″N 2°04′47″W	Category B	20314	Upload another image See more images
Golden Square, 4, 5, 6				57°08′46″N 2°06′16″W	Category B	20323	Upload Photo
Golden Square, 7, 8, 9				57°08′46″N 2°06′16″W	Category B	20324	Upload Photo
College Bounds, 48 (East Side) Old Aberdeen				57°09′47″N 2°06′06″W	Category B	20235	Upload Photo
Crown Street 57-83 (Odd Nos)				57°08′38″N 2°06′08″W	Category B	20242	Upload Photo
12-16 (Even Nos) Crown Street				57°08′41″N 2°06′14″W	Category B	20248	Upload Photo
Crown Street, 82				57°08′37″N 2°06′09″W	Category B	20249	Upload Photo
Crown Street 100-122 (Even Nos) And 2, 4 Dee Place				57°08′33″N 2°06′07″W	Category B	20251	Upload Photo
Crown Terrace, 4-7 (Inclusive)				57°08′39″N 2°06′06″W	Category C(S)	20252	Upload Photo
Crown Terrace, 13, 14				57°08′37″N 2°06′04″W	Category B	20253	Upload Photo
Dee Street, 37, 39				57°08′36″N 2°06′12″W	Category C(S)	20258	Upload Photo
1-8 (Inclusive Numbers) Devanha Terrace, Including Boundary Walls And Railings And Boundary Walls And Railings Enclosing Garden Across Road Opposite Front Elevation				57°08′14″N 2°06′00″W	Category B	20268	Upload Photo
31-55 (Odd Numbers) Carden Place And 2 And 4 Prince Arthur Street, Including Boundary Wall And Railings				57°08′37″N 2°07′24″W	Category B	20157	Upload Photo
17 Castle Street				57°08′55″N 2°05′33″W	Category B	20166	Upload another image
Chanonry, 3 (East Side) Old Aberdeen				57°10′04″N 2°06′08″W	Category B	20180	Upload Photo
Chanonry, 9 (West Side) Mitchell Hospital Old Aberdeen				57°10′08″N 2°06′13″W	Category A	20186	Upload another image
Chanonry, 10 (West Side) Old Aberdeen				57°10′08″N 2°06′19″W	Category B	20187	Upload Photo
Chanonry, 12 (West Side) Tillydrone House, Old Aberdeen				57°10′11″N 2°06′17″W	Category B	20190	Upload Photo
Chanonry, 12 Boundary Wall, Chanonry And Tillydrone Road				57°10′11″N 2°06′17″W	Category B	20191	Upload Photo
Chanonry, 16 Boundary Wall				57°10′10″N 2°06′06″W	Category B	20198	Upload Photo
Cherrybank 1-4 (Inclusive Nos) And 57-63 (Odd Nos) Hardgate				57°08′30″N 2°06′30″W	Category C(S)	20203	Upload Photo
College Bounds, 5, 5A (West Side) Old Aberdeen				57°09′43″N 2°06′06″W	Category B	20208	Upload Photo
2, 2A, 4, 8-16 (Even Numbers) Albyn Place, Including Railings				57°08′35″N 2°06′51″W	Category B	20117	Upload Photo
2 Little Belmont Street And 11A Back Wynd				57°08′50″N 2°06′01″W	Category C(S)	20125	Upload Photo
19 Belmont Street				57°08′48″N 2°06′05″W	Category C(S)	20128	Upload Photo
25 Belmont Street				57°08′49″N 2°06′06″W	Category B	20129	Upload Photo
Bon Accord Crescent 1-19 (Inclusive)				57°08′31″N 2°06′24″W	Category B	20135	Upload Photo
Bon Accord Square 1-17 (Odd Nos) And 1-7 (Odd Nos) East Craibstone Street And 1-7 (Odd Nos) West Craibstone Street				57°08′33″N 2°06′26″W	Category B	20136	Upload Photo
Bon Accord Square, 2-20 (Even Nos) And 35-47 (Odd Nos) Langstane Place, 2, 4, 6, West Craibstone Street Frontage To Square Of Garage At 10 Bon Accord Street And 25 Bon Accord Terrace				57°08′34″N 2°06′28″W	Category B	20137	Upload Photo
Bon Accord Street, 75-101 (Odd Nos)				57°08′31″N 2°06′17″W	Category C(S)	20142	Upload Photo
Bon Accord Street 103-119 (Odd Nos)				57°08′29″N 2°06′15″W	Category C(S)	20143	Upload Photo
Bon Accord Street 38-46 (Even Nos)				57°08′33″N 2°06′19″W	Category C(S)	20145	Upload Photo
Bon Accord Street, 70-78 (Even Nos)				57°08′28″N 2°06′16″W	Category C(S)	20150	Upload Photo
Bon Accord Terrace, 32-40 (Even Nos) And 37-45 (Odd Nos) Hardgate				57°08′32″N 2°06′30″W	Category C(S)	20153	Upload Photo
Bon Accord Terrace, 44, 46 And 49,51 Hardgate				57°08′31″N 2°06′30″W	Category C(S)	20154	Upload Photo
Albyn Place, Harlaw Academy, Including Gatepiers And Boundary Walls				57°08′33″N 2°07′01″W	Category B	20083	Upload Photo
Alford Place, The College (Former Christ's College), Including Railings				57°08′34″N 2°06′45″W	Category B	20086	Upload Photo
1-23 (Odd Numbers) Albert Street, Including Boundary Walls And Railings				57°08′40″N 2°06′58″W	Category B	20113	Upload Photo
2-18 (Even Numbers) Albert Street, Including Boundary Walls And Railings				57°08′41″N 2°07′01″W	Category B	20114	Upload Photo
1-34 (Inclusive Numbers) Albert Terrace And 1 Prince Arthur Street, Including Boundary Walls And Railings				57°08′39″N 2°07′03″W	Category B	20115	Upload Photo
Skene Street And Esslemont Avenue, Aberdeen Grammar School, Lord Byron Statue				57°08′48″N 2°06′52″W	Category B	20003	Upload another image
March Stone No. 1, In Roadway At S.E. Junction Of Hardgate And Union Glen				57°08′27″N 2°06′32″W	Category B	20014	Upload another image
March Stone No. 9, At 126 Craigton Road				57°07′45″N 2°09′06″W	Category B	20022	Upload another image
March Stone No. 10, On South Side Of Craigton Road Opposite Slopefield Reservoir				57°07′35″N 2°09′43″W	Category B	20023	Upload another image
March Stone No. 50, In Corner Of Don Terrace, At Foot Of Deer Road Above Grandholm Bridge And Near Woodside Railway Station				57°10′23″N 2°07′41″W	Category B	20030	Upload another image
March Stone No. 52, In Smithfield Road At The South-East Corner Of Woodside School Boundary Wall				57°10′12″N 2°07′47″W	Category B	20032	Upload another image
Crabstone, Hardgate, At Rear Boundary Of 6 West Craibstone Street				57°08′35″N 2°06′29″W	Category B	20049	Upload Photo
Well Of Spa Spa Street				57°08′55″N 2°06′23″W	Category B	20055	Upload another image See more images
Seaton Park, Walled Garden, Don Street				57°10′28″N 2°05′55″W	Category B	20062	Upload another image
Schoolhill And Belmont Street, Former Triple Kirks Churches, Including Steeple And Former East Free Church				57°08′51″N 2°06′09″W	Category A	19940	Upload another image See more images
Carden Place At Albert Street, Former Melville Carden Place Church, Including Gatepiers, Boundary Walls And Railings				57°08′44″N 2°07′04″W	Category B	19944	Upload another image
Sacred Heart, Church Of The (R. C.) And Presbytery House, Grampian And Glenbervie Roads, Torry				57°08′09″N 2°05′15″W	Category B	19952	Upload Photo
Mid Stocket Road, St Ninian's Church (Church Of Scotland), Including Gates, Gatepiers And Boundary Walls				57°09′00″N 2°08′06″W	Category B	19971	Upload Photo
St Peter's R.C. Church And Presbytery And 1-5 Chapel Court				57°08′55″N 2°05′32″W	Category B	19973	Upload another image

== Key ==
The scheme for classifying buildings in Scotland is:

- Category A: "buildings of national or international importance, either architectural or historic; or fine, little-altered examples of some particular period, style or building type."
- Category B: "buildings of regional or more than local importance; or major examples of some particular period, style or building type, which may have been altered."
- Category C: "buildings of local importance; lesser examples of any period, style, or building type, as originally constructed or moderately altered; and simple traditional buildings which group well with other listed buildings."

In March 2016 there were 47,288 listed buildings in Scotland. Of these, 8% were Category A, and 50% were Category B, with the remaining 42% being Category C.

== See also ==
- List of listed buildings in Aberdeen
