= List of listed buildings in Dyce =

This is a list of listed buildings in the parish of Dyce in Aberdeen, Scotland.

== List ==
Name	Location	Date listed	Grid ref. (Note: Sometimes known as OSGB36, the grid reference (where provided) is based on the British national grid reference system used by the Ordnance Survey. • "Guide to National Grid". Ordnance Survey. • "Get-a-map". Ordnance Survey.)	Geo-coordinates	Notes	LB number (Note: Historic Environment Scotland assign a unique alphanumeric identifier to each designated site in Scotland, for listed buildings this always begins with "LB", for example "LB12345".)	Image
Lidell's Monument				57°13′38″N 2°13′05″W	Category A	2230	Upload another image
Bendauch, Farmhouse				57°13′25″N 2°16′09″W	Category B	2235	Upload Photo
Pitmedden House				57°13′25″N 2°13′48″W	Category C(S)	2231	Upload Photo
Mains Of Dyce, Farmhouse				57°12′55″N 2°11′08″W	Category C(S)	2232	Upload another image
Crook O'Don (Former Manse Of Dyce) Including Offices				57°13′42″N 2°12′19″W	Category B	2229	Upload Photo
Dyce, Pimedden Road, Pillbox At Tillybrig Cottage				57°13′19″N 2°12′34″W	Category C(S)	50879	Upload another image
Foot O'Hill, House And Steading				57°12′35″N 2°16′31″W	Category C(S)	2236	Upload Photo
Skene Burial Enclosure, Mains Of Dyce				57°12′47″N 2°10′49″W	Category B	2233	Upload another image
Caskieben, Steading And Stables				57°12′20″N 2°16′46″W	Category B	2237	Upload Photo
Caskieben Old Farm House And Steading				57°12′20″N 2°16′43″W	Category C(S)	2238	Upload Photo
Dyce War Memorial, Gordon Terrace, Dyce				57°12′21″N 2°11′14″W	Category C(S)	2234	Upload another image
Former Canal Aqueduct over Black Burn, Kinaldie				57°13′41″N 2°16′45″W	Category C(S)	52533	Upload another image
Air Traffic Control Tower excluding interior, podium block to north and garage to north, Aberdeen International Airport, Ninian Road, Dyce, Aberdeen				57°12′19″N 2°12′22″W	Category B	52619	Upload another image

== Key ==
The scheme for classifying buildings in Scotland is:

- Category A: "buildings of national or international importance, either architectural or historic; or fine, little-altered examples of some particular period, style or building type."
- Category B: "buildings of regional or more than local importance; or major examples of some particular period, style or building type, which may have been altered."
- Category C: "buildings of local importance; lesser examples of any period, style, or building type, as originally constructed or moderately altered; and simple traditional buildings which group well with other listed buildings."

In March 2016 there were 47,288 listed buildings in Scotland. Of these, 8% were Category A, and 50% were Category B, with the remaining 42% being Category C.

== See also ==
- List of listed buildings in Aberdeen
