= List of listed buildings in Aberdeen =

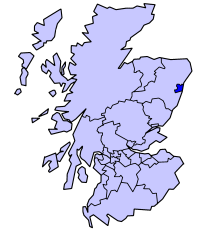
Aberdeen shown within Scotland

This is a list of listed buildings in Aberdeen. The list is split out by parish.

- List of listed buildings in Aberdeen/1
- List of listed buildings in Aberdeen/2
- List of listed buildings in Aberdeen/3
- List of listed buildings in Aberdeen/4
- List of listed buildings in Aberdeen/5
- List of listed buildings in Aberdeen/6
- List of listed buildings in Aberdeen/7
- List of listed buildings in Dyce
- List of listed buildings in Newhills
- List of listed buildings in Nigg, Aberdeen
- List of listed buildings in Old Machar
- List of listed buildings in Peterculter

== See also ==
- Scheduled monuments in Aberdeen
