= List of listed buildings in Newhills =

This is a list of listed buildings in the parish of Newhills in Aberdeen, Scotland.

== List ==
Name	Location	Date listed	Grid ref. (Note: Sometimes known as OSGB36, the grid reference (where provided) is based on the British national grid reference system used by the Ordnance Survey. • "Guide to National Grid". Ordnance Survey. • "Get-a-map". Ordnance Survey.)	Geo-coordinates	Notes	LB number (Note: Historic Environment Scotland assign a unique alphanumeric identifier to each designated site in Scotland, for listed buildings this always begins with "LB", for example "LB12345".)	Image
March Stone No.29 On The Farm Of Wynford On The Parish Boundary North Of Wellside And Near The Burn				57°10′15″N 2°15′44″W	Category B	15664	Upload Photo
Kingswells Church Of Scotland				57°08′49″N 2°13′03″W	Category C(S)	15683	Upload another image
March Stone No.36 On The Farm Of Greenwelltree On The Line Of The Chapman Road				57°11′04″N 2°14′10″W	Category B	15704	Upload another image
March Stone No.41 On The Farm Of Netherhills On The South Side Of The Road Leading From Newhills Church To Bucksburn				57°10′33″N 2°11′57″W	Category B	15660	Upload another image
March Stone No.43 On The South Side Of Kepplehills Road At Wagley				57°10′29″N 2°11′16″W	Category B	15662	Upload another image
March Stone No.28 On The Farm Of Borrowston On The Parish Boundary East Of Easter Mains				57°09′48″N 2°15′23″W	Category B	15663	Upload Photo
Friends' Burial Ground W.N.W. Of Kingswells House				57°09′02″N 2°14′19″W	Category C(S)	15680	Upload another image
Bucksburn Church Of Scotland, Oldmeldrum Road				57°10′39″N 2°10′15″W	Category C(S)	15687	Upload another image
Stoneywood House				57°11′36″N 2°10′30″W	Category B	15697	Upload another image
Grampian Rc Outdoor Centre (Formerly Old Schools) 101, Stoneywood Road, Bankhead				57°11′15″N 2°10′50″W	Category C(S)	15702	Upload another image
March Stone No.35 On The Farm Of Greenwelltree On The Line Of The Chapman Road				57°11′07″N 2°14′21″W	Category B	15703	Upload Photo
Parish Church Of Newhills				57°10′33″N 2°12′24″W	Category C(S)	15650	Upload another image
Newhills House Newhills				57°10′29″N 2°12′33″W	Category C(S)	15651	Upload Photo
Cloghill House, Offices				57°09′30″N 2°14′06″W	Category C(S)	15679	Upload Photo
Stoneywood House Lodge				57°11′27″N 2°10′30″W	Category C(S)	15698	Upload another image
Fairley House				57°09′44″N 2°13′40″W	Category C(S)	15705	Upload Photo
Waterton House				57°11′15″N 2°10′34″W	Category B	15706	Upload Photo
March Stone No.44, Bucksburn				57°10′24″N 2°10′48″W	Category B	15708	Upload another image
Whitemyres House				57°09′06″N 2°11′07″W	Category B	19752	Upload Photo
St. Machar's Episcopal Church, Oldmeldrum Road, Bucksburn				57°10′43″N 2°10′14″W	Category B	15688	Upload another image
Persley Bridge Over River Don				57°10′34″N 2°09′08″W	Category B	15696	Upload another image
Cloghill House				57°09′29″N 2°14′05″W	Category B	15655	Upload Photo
March Stone No.42 On The Farm Of Netherhills On The North Side Of The Road Leading From Newhills Church To Bucksburn				57°10′31″N 2°11′47″W	Category B	15661	Upload Photo
March Stone No.30 On The Farm Of Wynford At The Confluence Of The Tulloch And Blind Burns As The Black Burn				57°10′24″N 2°16′04″W	Category B	15665	Upload another image
March Stone No.32 On The Farm Of Tulloch In A Cairn Of Stone South Of Southside Of Clinterty				57°10′46″N 2°15′08″W	Category B	15667	Upload Photo
Old Whitemyres, N. Part Of Steading				57°09′02″N 2°11′05″W	Category C(S)	15685	Upload Photo
March Stone No.33 On The Farm Of Tulloch Near The Source Of The Blind Burn				57°10′51″N 2°14′55″W	Category B	15700	Upload Photo
March Stone No.34 On The Farm Of Greenwelltree Near The Carlet Burn At The Point Where The March Reaches The Chapman Road				57°11′09″N 2°14′26″W	Category B	15701	Upload another image
Churchyard Of Newhills (Old Part Only)				57°10′32″N 2°12′50″W	Category B	15654	Upload Photo
Old Whitemyres, Farmhouse				57°09′01″N 2°11′04″W	Category C(S)	15684	Upload Photo
March Stone No.37, Ashtown Farm				57°10′54″N 2°13′40″W	Category B	15707	Upload another image
Clinterty House				57°10′52″N 2°15′36″W	Category B	15709	Upload Photo
Manse Cottage				57°10′26″N 2°12′46″W	Category C(S)	15652	Upload Photo
Cloghill House Sundial				57°09′29″N 2°14′04″W	Category B	15656	Upload Photo
Kingswells House				57°08′54″N 2°13′46″W	Category B	15681	Upload another image
Old Parish Church Of Newhills				57°10′33″N 2°12′50″W	Category B	15653	Upload another image
March Stone No.31 On The Farm Of Wynford W Of The Road To Rivehill And N.N.E. Of No.30				57°10′30″N 2°16′00″W	Category B	15666	Upload another image
March Stone No.40 On The Farm Of Kirkhill South Of Newhills Convalescent Home And Built Into The Dyke				57°10′40″N 2°12′29″W	Category B	15659	Upload another image
Stoneywood Mill, Canteen Building				57°11′24″N 2°10′25″W	Category B	52007	Upload Photo
Former Canal Aqueduct over Bucks Burn, Station Road, Bucksburn, Aberdeen				57°10′41″N 2°10′14″W	Category C(S)	52534	Upload Photo

== Key ==
The scheme for classifying buildings in Scotland is:

- Category A: "buildings of national or international importance, either architectural or historic; or fine, little-altered examples of some particular period, style or building type."
- Category B: "buildings of regional or more than local importance; or major examples of some particular period, style or building type, which may have been altered."
- Category C: "buildings of local importance; lesser examples of any period, style, or building type, as originally constructed or moderately altered; and simple traditional buildings which group well with other listed buildings."

In March 2016 there were 47,288 listed buildings in Scotland. Of these, 8% were Category A, and 50% were Category B, with the remaining 42% being Category C.

== See also ==
- List of listed buildings in Aberdeen
