= Woodside, Aberdeen =

Coordinates: 57.170754°N 2.1252°W

Woodside
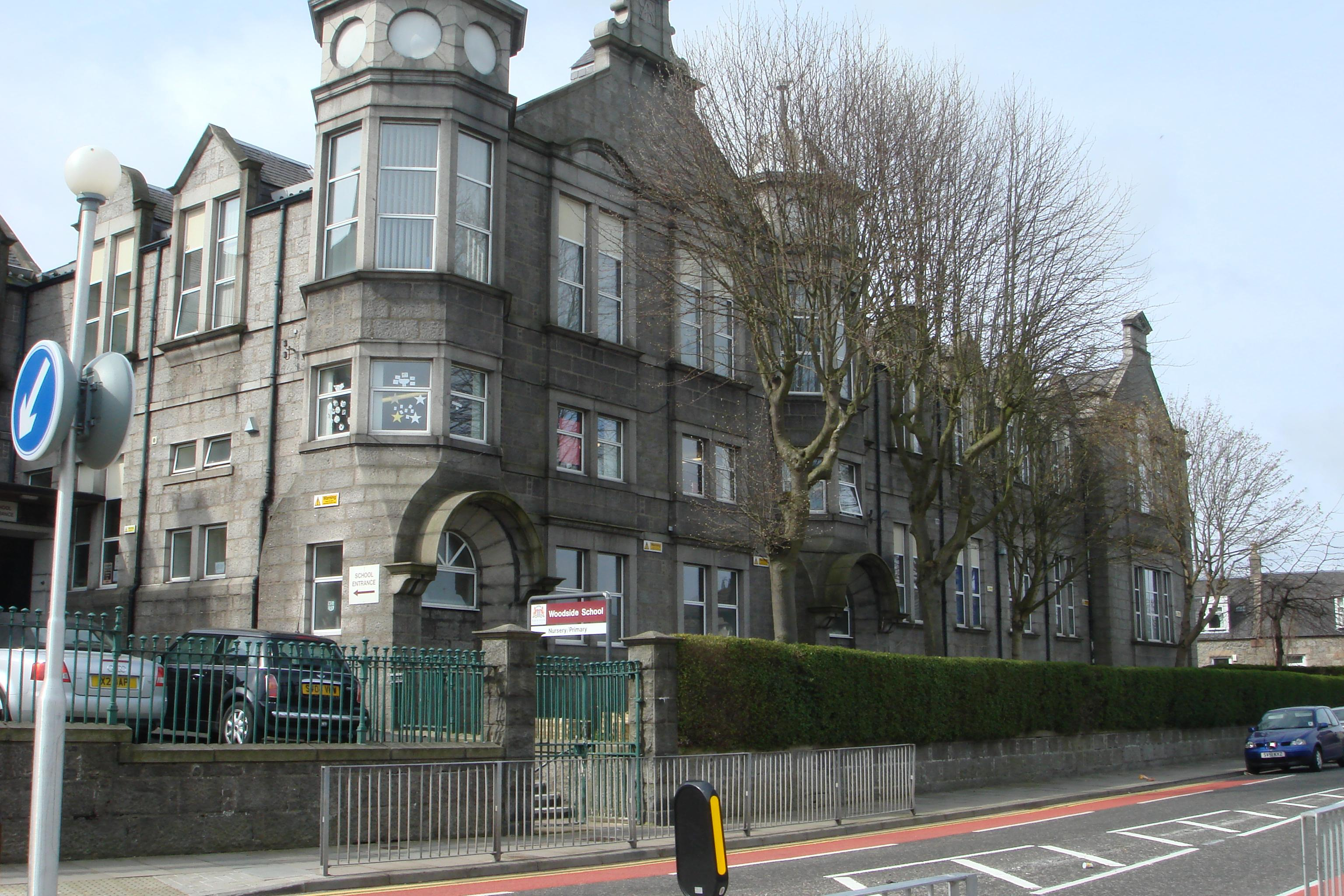
- Woodside Primary School

- Location within the Aberdeen City council area Location within Scotland
- OS grid reference: NJ925088
- Council area: Aberdeen City
- Lieutenancy area: Aberdeen
- Country: Scotland
- Sovereign state: United Kingdom
- Post town: ABERDEEN
- Postcode district: AB24
- Dialling code: 01224
- Police: Scotland
- Fire: Scottish
- Ambulance: Scottish
- UK Parliament: Aberdeen North
- Scottish Parliament: Aberdeen Donside
- Website: aberdeencity.gov.uk

Woodside is an area of Aberdeen. It came into existence as a quoad sacra parish within the parish of Old Machar in 1834, under an act of The General Assembly of the Church of Scotland of 31 May 1834 (IX. Sess. 10, 31 May 1834. – Declaration Enactment as to Chapels of Ease), and was named for the principal residence of the area, Woodside House.

Within this parish, which was bounded to the north by the River Don there were three villages, Woodside, Tanfield and Cotton (also known as Nether Cottown). Its population in 1841 was 4,893 living in 440 houses. By 1868 it had become a police burgh and the community was being described as a village in its own right (distinct from the quoad sacra parish of which it was the largest part), and a suburb of Aberdeen. It was part of the Aberdeen Burgh Parliamentary constituency.

By 1881, it had developed into a community of 5,452 (the population of quoad sacra parish population growing to 5,928). It had its own separate post office, a railway station, paper works, a free library, a public school and a number of churches of various denominations. Ten years later in 1891 it was formally incorporated into the county of the city of Aberdeen (along with Old Aberdeen and Torry).

== Schools ==
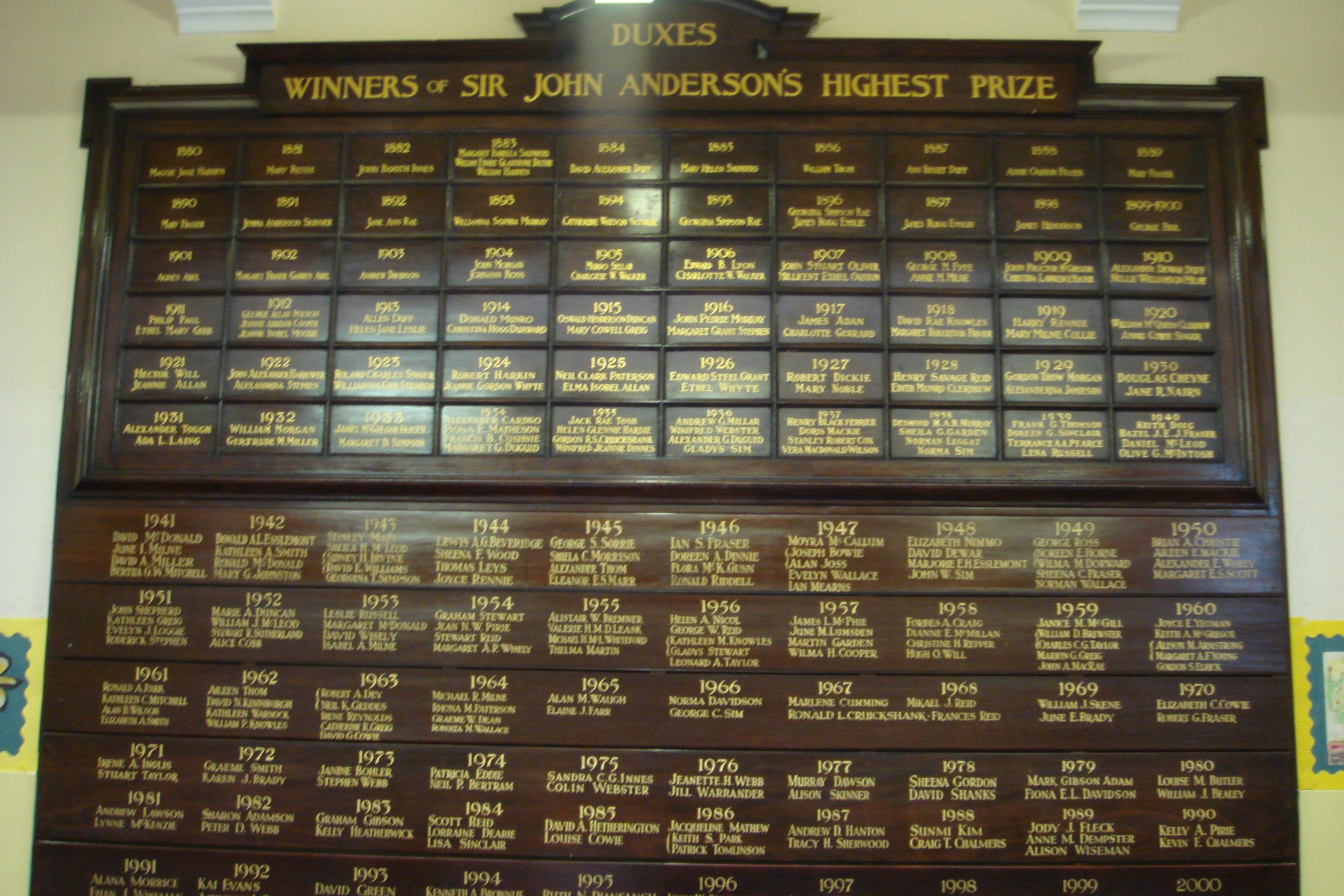
Woodside Primary School Dux Board

Woodside Primary School is a nursery and primary school run by Aberdeen City Council that takes children from the ages of 3 to 11. It currently has around 360 primary (P1-7) pupils and 80 nursery pupils. It was built as replacement for a much smaller school dating from 1834. It consists of a main granite building, originally built in 1890 and expanded in 1902, and a separate smaller building and garden for the nursery aged pupils. It is located at the corner of Clifton Road with Smithfield Road, opposite the Aberdeen March Stones numbered 51 and 52. The current head teacher is Mrs. Alison Cook.

Dóxa Theó Christian School is the first Classical Christian school in Scotland. It is run by Grace Baptist Church Aberdeen and takes children from the ages of 4 to 11.

== Woodside Library ==
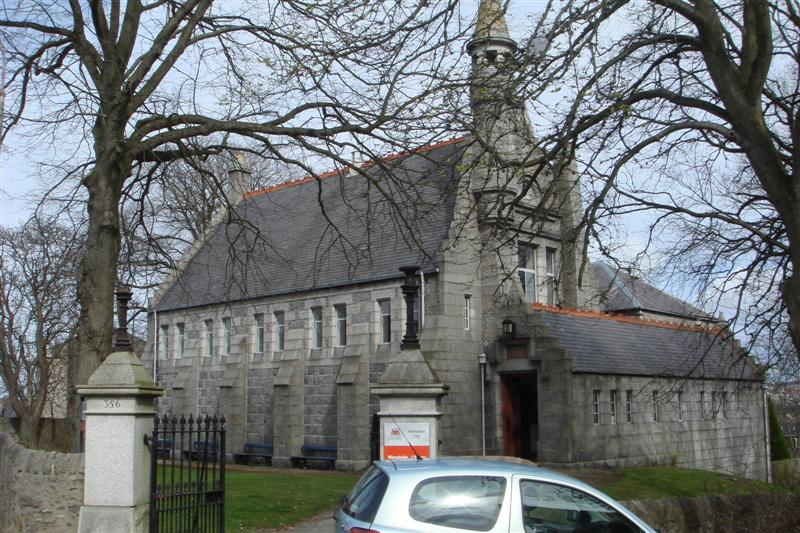
Woodside Library on Clifton Road

Designed by the architect Arthur Clyne, the library was built in 1882.

It was originally named Anderson library after Sir John Anderson, who was born and raised in Woodside. He gifted the library to the people of Woodside in perpetuity along with 50,000 volumes. It is a large granite building styled like a church.

By 1932 Woodside Library was the biggest branch library in Aberdeen, with around 70,000 books borrowed each year.

In March 2023, the local authority announced it would close six local libraries, including Woodside.

== March Stones ==
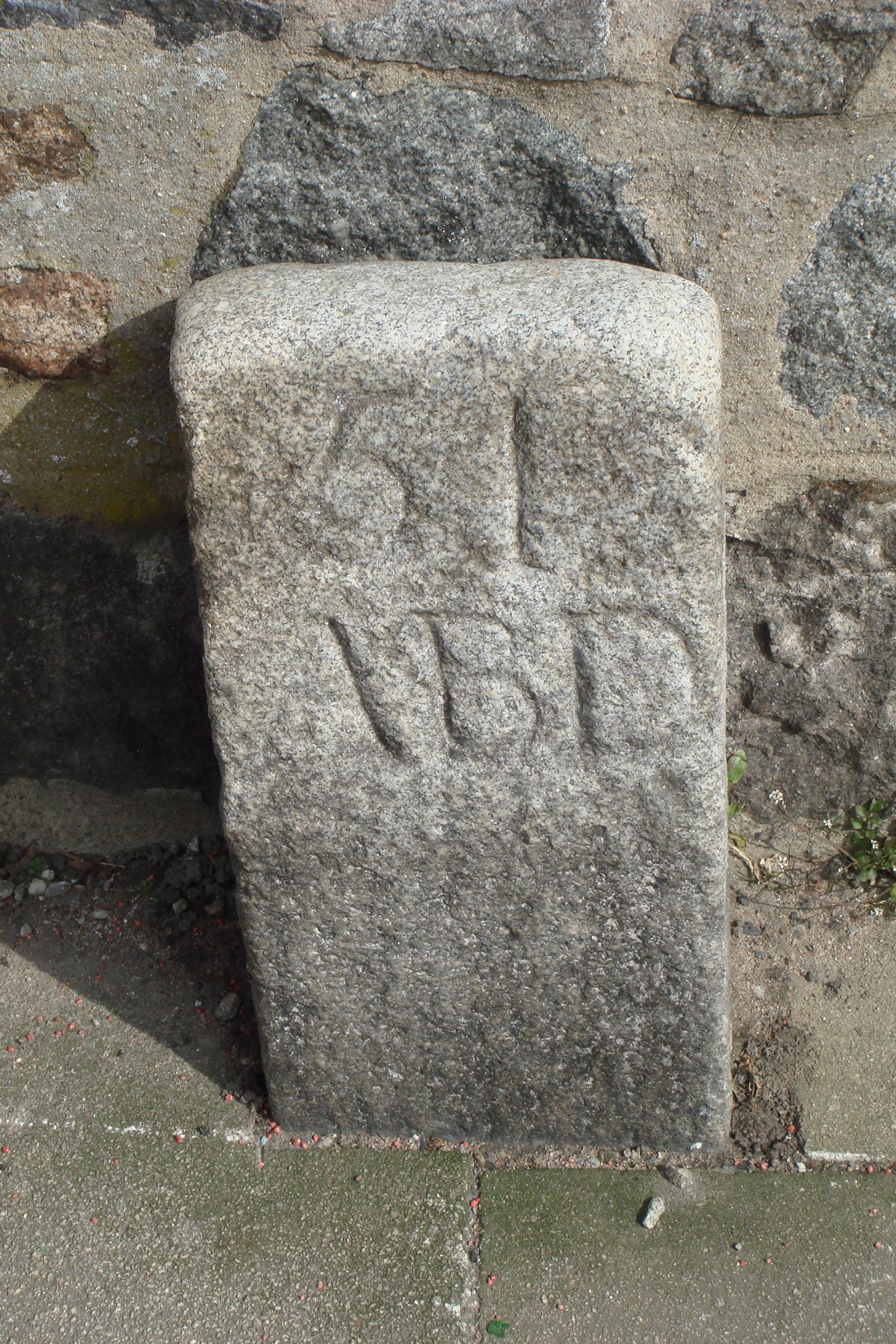
March Stone 51 on Clifton Road

There are 67 "March Stones" around Aberdeen. King Robert I ("Robert the Bruce") gave the people of Aberdeen the land around the city in thanks for helping him in 1313. This land was known as the Freedom Lands of Aberdeen, and the March Stones mark the boundary.

The March Stones start with Alpha and end with Omega. The route around them is approximately 26 miles long. Woodside March Stones are numbered 50, 51 and 52. March Stone 50 is located close to Station House Media Unit, and Stones 51 and 52 near Woodside School.

== The Church ==
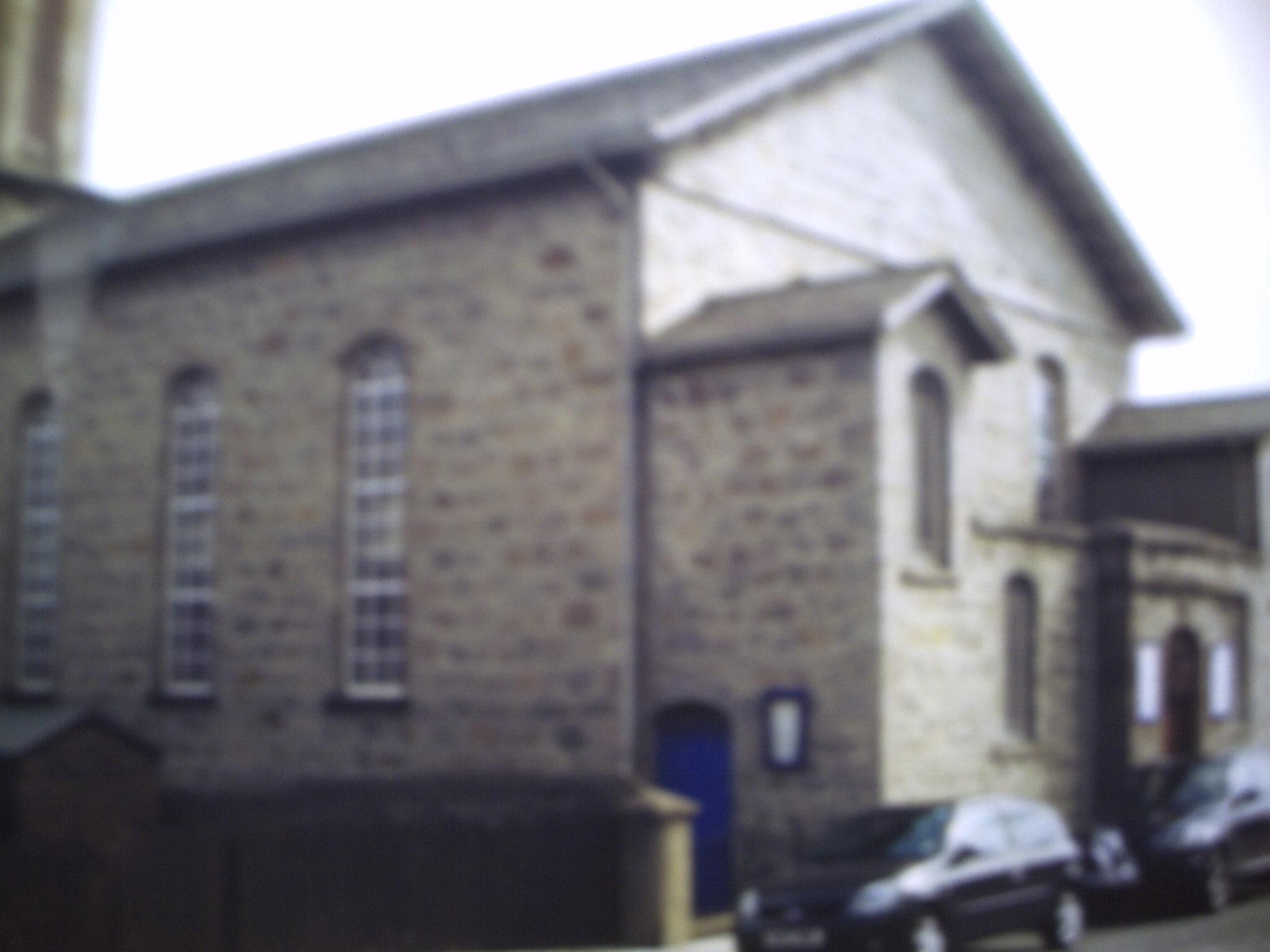
Woodside Parish Church

There used to be three churches in Woodside, the North and South Churches and the Congregational Church which was on Great Northern Road. The North Church is now a block of flats. Choirs, drama groups, dances, musical nights and concerts were held there.

Woodside Parish Church, the Church of Scotland parish church for the area, is located in the middle of Church Street. Youth clubs, the Boy's Brigade, Girl Guides and indoor bowling were held there. In 2023, the congregation merged with that of the neighbouring High Hilton Parish Church on Hilton Drive; the union will be based there and be known as Aberdeen Hillside Parish Church (one of several such mergers across the city), with the Category B-listed Woodside building being sold to Grace Baptist Church Aberdeen, a Reformed Baptist Church which was planted six years ago.

There is also a Congregational Church on Printfield Walk and a catholic church (St Joseph's) on Tanfield Walk.

== Stewart Park ==
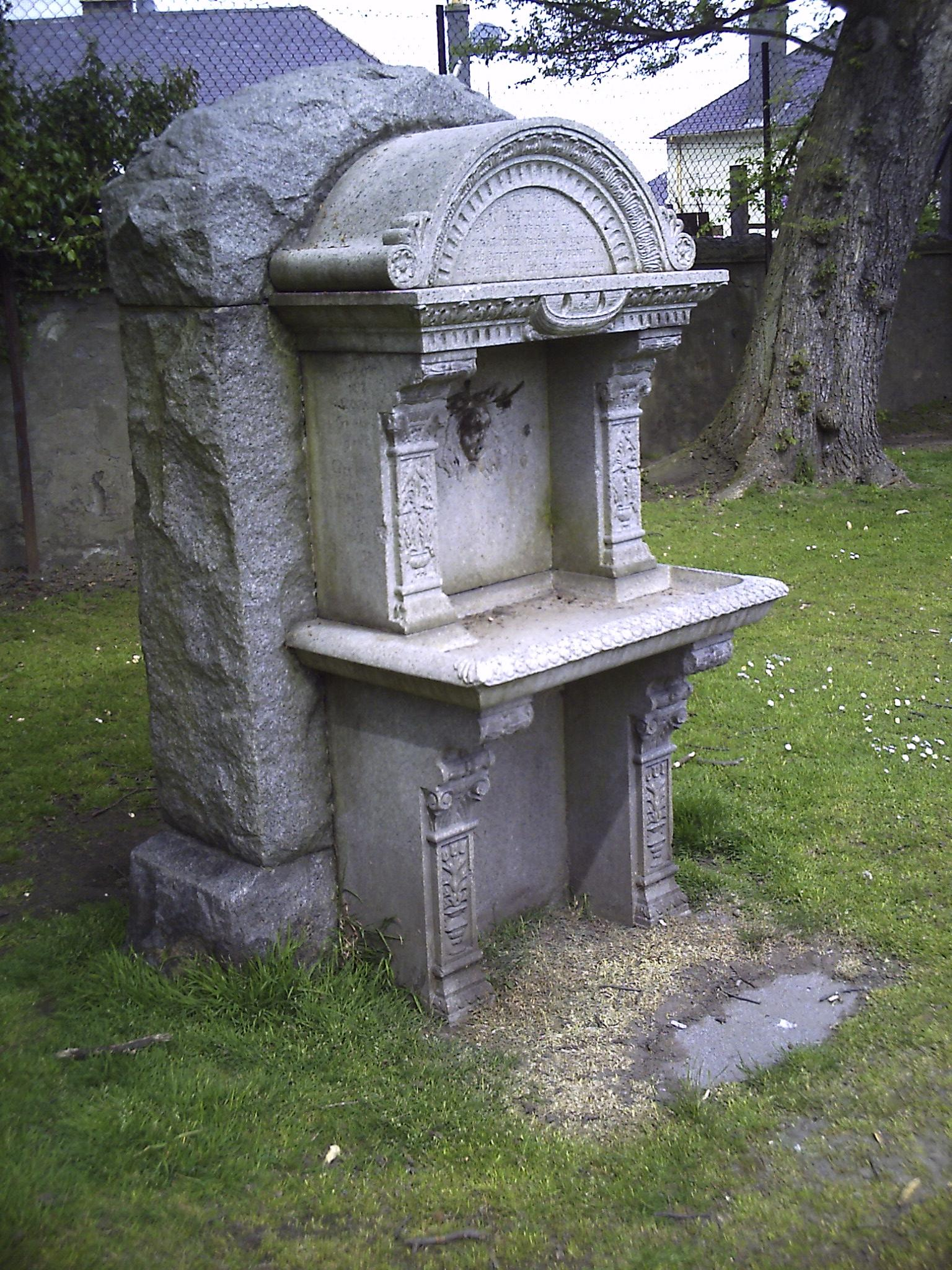
Stewart Park Fountain

Stewart Park lies between Smithfield Road and Hilton Road. It is a large park with tennis courts, a play area, golf putting, playing fields, whale bones and a fountain.

== Woodside Railway Station ==
In 1858, A station was opened in Woodside on the drained bed of the old Woodside Canal, six miles from Aberdeen Joint Station. It was built to encourage people to move from Aberdeen city centre, enabling them to travel to work. The suburban service ended in 1937 with the closure of all its stations, though the now derelict platform can still be seen by trains passing by on the line, which remains open (the first stop after Aberdeen is now Dyce on the city's northern periphery).
