= List of listed buildings in Nigg, Aberdeen =

This is a list of listed buildings in the parish of Nigg in Aberdeen, Scotland.

== List ==
| Name | Location | Date listed | Grid ref. (Note: Sometimes known as OSGB36, the grid reference (where provided) is based on the British national grid reference system used by the Ordnance Survey. • "Guide to National Grid". Ordnance Survey. • "Get-a-map". Ordnance Survey.) | Geo-coordinates | Notes | LB number (Note: Historic Environment Scotland assign a unique alphanumeric identifier to each designated site in Scotland, for listed buildings this always begins with "LB", for example "LB12345".) | Image |
|---|---|---|---|---|---|---|---|
| 8 Loirston Road | | | | 57°06′00″N 2°04′47″W | Category C(S) | 15626 | Upload Photo |
| 2, 4, 4A Spark Terrace, Cove Bay | | | | 57°05′56″N 2°04′41″W | Category C(S) | 15629 | Upload Photo |
| 7 and 9 Hasman Terrace | | | | 57°05′56″N 2°04′41″W | Category C(S) | 15632 | Upload Photo |
| Nos 1-9 Colsea Road (Odd Numbers), Cove Bay | | | | 57°05′58″N 2°04′41″W | Category C(S) | 15637 | Upload Photo |
| 3 Spark Terrace, Cove Bay | | | | 57°05′57″N 2°04′43″W | Category C(S) | 19751 | Upload Photo |
| Cove Bay, Loirston Road, St Mary The Virgin Scottish Episcopal Church | | | | 57°06′00″N 2°04′49″W | Category B | 19057 | Upload Photo |
| 16 Loirston Road, Cove Bay | | | | 57°06′03″N 2°04′48″W | Category C(S) | 15624 | Upload Photo |
| Cove Bay Hotel, Colsea Road | | | | 57°05′57″N 2°04′39″W | Category C(S) | 15633 | Upload another image See more images |
| 9 Loirston Road, Cove Bay | | | | 57°05′57″N 2°04′48″W | Category C(S) | 15621 | Upload Photo |
| 2 Hasman Terrace | | | | 57°05′55″N 2°04′40″W | Category C(S) | 15630 | Upload Photo |
| 2, 4 Springhill Terrace | | | | 57°05′54″N 2°04′40″W | Category C(S) | 15631 | Upload Photo |
| Nos 4, 6, 8 Colsea Road, Cove Bay | | | | 57°05′57″N 2°04′42″W | Category C(S) | 15638 | Upload Photo |
| 31 Loirston Road, Cove Bay | | | | 57°06′08″N 2°04′50″W | Category C(S) | 15622 | Upload Photo |
| Cove Bay, 7, 8 Balmoral Place | | | | 57°05′51″N 2°04′27″W | Category C(S) | 17432 | Upload Photo |
| 2 Loirston Road, Cove Bay | | | | 57°06′00″N 2°04′49″W | Category C(S) | 15623 | Upload Photo |
| 1 Loirston Road, Seaview House | | | | 57°05′54″N 2°04′52″W | Category C(S) | 15625 | Upload Photo |
| 25 Loirston Road | | | | 57°06′05″N 2°04′50″W | Category C(S) | 15627 | Upload Photo |
| 1 Spark Terrace, Cove Bay | | | | 57°05′56″N 2°04′44″W | Category C(S) | 15628 | Upload Photo |

== Key ==
The scheme for classifying buildings in Scotland is:

- Category A: "buildings of national or international importance, either architectural or historic; or fine, little-altered examples of some particular period, style or building type."
- Category B: "buildings of regional or more than local importance; or major examples of some particular period, style or building type, which may have been altered."
- Category C: "buildings of local importance; lesser examples of any period, style, or building type, as originally constructed or moderately altered; and simple traditional buildings which group well with other listed buildings."

In March 2016 there were 47,288 listed buildings in Scotland. Of these, 8% were Category A, and 50% were Category B, with the remaining 42% being Category C.

== See also ==
- List of listed buildings in Aberdeen
