= List of listed buildings in Old Machar =

This is a list of listed buildings in the parish of Old Machar in Aberdeen, Scotland.

== List ==
Name	Location	Date listed	Grid ref. (Note: Sometimes known as OSGB36, the grid reference (where provided) is based on the British national grid reference system used by the Ordnance Survey. • "Guide to National Grid". Ordnance Survey. • "Get-a-map". Ordnance Survey.)	Geo-coordinates	Notes	LB number (Note: Historic Environment Scotland assign a unique alphanumeric identifier to each designated site in Scotland, for listed buildings this always begins with "LB", for example "LB12345".)	Image
Ellon Road, Gordon Barracks Medical Reception Centre				57°10′51″N 2°05′13″W	Category B	18848	Upload another image
Ellon Road, Gordon Barracks, Corunna Road, Married Quarters Type IV				57°10′52″N 2°05′00″W	Category B	18850	Upload Photo
Ellon Road, Gordon Barracks Parade Ground, Other Ranks' Mess				57°10′50″N 2°05′22″W	Category B	18852	Upload another image
2-20 (Inclusive Nos) Cottown of Balgownie, Bridge of Don				57°10′37″N 2°05′42″W	Category B	15668	Upload another image
Ellon Road, Mill Of Mundurno				57°12′13″N 2°05′20″W	Category B	15678	Upload another image
Ellon Road, Gordon Barracks Parade Ground Barracks Block A				57°10′50″N 2°05′24″W	Category B	18856	Upload Photo
Ellon Road, Gordon Barracks Parade Ground Barracks Block B				57°10′50″N 2°05′19″W	Category B	18857	Upload Photo
Grandholm Works, Old Spinning Mill, Wing Mill, Engine And Turbine Houses				57°10′38″N 2°07′28″W	Category A	18985	Upload another image See more images
Grandhome House				57°11′47″N 2°10′11″W	Category B	15673	Upload Photo
Lodges And Gate, Grandhome Policies				57°11′52″N 2°09′38″W	Category B	15674	Upload Photo
Ellon Road, Gordon Barracks, Gymnasium				57°10′51″N 2°05′22″W	Category B	18861	Upload Photo
Balgownie Lodge Gatehouse				57°10′43″N 2°06′27″W	Category C(S)	15672	Upload Photo
79 Balgownie Road, Glover House (Formerly Known As Braehead), Including Boundary Walls				57°10′43″N 2°06′14″W	Category B	49996	Upload another image
Persleyden, View Cottage				57°10′44″N 2°07′46″W	Category C(S)	19110	Upload Photo
Ellon Road, Gordon Barracks Parade Ground, Depot Office				57°10′47″N 2°05′17″W	Category B	18855	Upload Photo
Berryhill Salmon Netting Station				57°11′56″N 2°04′17″W	Category B	49960	Upload Photo
Danestone House, Walled Garden And Summerhouse				57°10′50″N 2°07′39″W	Category B	19109	Upload Photo
Ellon Road, Gordon Barracks, Corunna Road, Married Quarters Type III				57°10′52″N 2°05′02″W	Category B	18849	Upload Photo
Ellon Road, Gordon Barracks Parade Ground, Company Office				57°10′49″N 2°05′18″W	Category B	18853	Upload Photo
Ellon Road, Gordon Barracks Parade Ground Barracks Block D				57°10′51″N 2°05′20″W	Category B	18859	Upload Photo
Ellon Road, Gordon Barracks Parade Ground, Junior Ranks' Club				57°10′48″N 2°05′17″W	Category B	18860	Upload another image
Walled Garden and Sundial, Grandhome Policies				57°11′55″N 2°10′09″W	Category C(S)	15676	Upload Photo
Ellon Road, Gordon Barracks, Corunna Road, Officers' Mess				57°10′52″N 2°05′05″W	Category B	18851	Upload Photo
Danestone House				57°10′45″N 2°07′41″W	Category B	19108	Upload Photo
Danestone House, Icehouse to South-West of View Cottage, Persleyden				57°10′43″N 2°07′48″W	Category B	19111	Upload Photo
Ellon Road, Gordon Barracks Parade Ground Guard Room, Gate Piers and Gates				57°10′46″N 2°05′23″W	Category B	18854	Upload Photo
Ellon Road, Gordon Barracks Parade Ground Barracks Block C				57°10′51″N 2°05′24″W	Category B	18858	Upload Photo
"Bridgefield", Balgownie Road, Bridge Of Don				57°10′42″N 2°05′50″W	Category C(S)	15670	Upload Photo
Balgownie Lodge				57°10′41″N 2°06′38″W	Category B	15671	Upload Photo
Grandhome Dovecot, Grandhome Policies				57°11′49″N 2°09′58″W	Category B	15675	Upload Photo
Bridge of Don				57°10′32″N 2°05′26″W	Category B	15710	Upload another image

== Key ==
The scheme for classifying buildings in Scotland is:

- Category A: "buildings of national or international importance, either architectural or historic; or fine, little-altered examples of some particular period, style or building type."
- Category B: "buildings of regional or more than local importance; or major examples of some particular period, style or building type, which may have been altered."
- Category C: "buildings of local importance; lesser examples of any period, style, or building type, as originally constructed or moderately altered; and simple traditional buildings which group well with other listed buildings."

In March 2016 there were 47,288 listed buildings in Scotland. Of these, 8% were Category A, and 50% were Category B, with the remaining 42% being Category C.

== See also ==
- List of listed buildings in Aberdeen
