= John Anderson (Scottish engineer) =

Scottish engineer and inventor

Sir John Anderson FRSE MICE
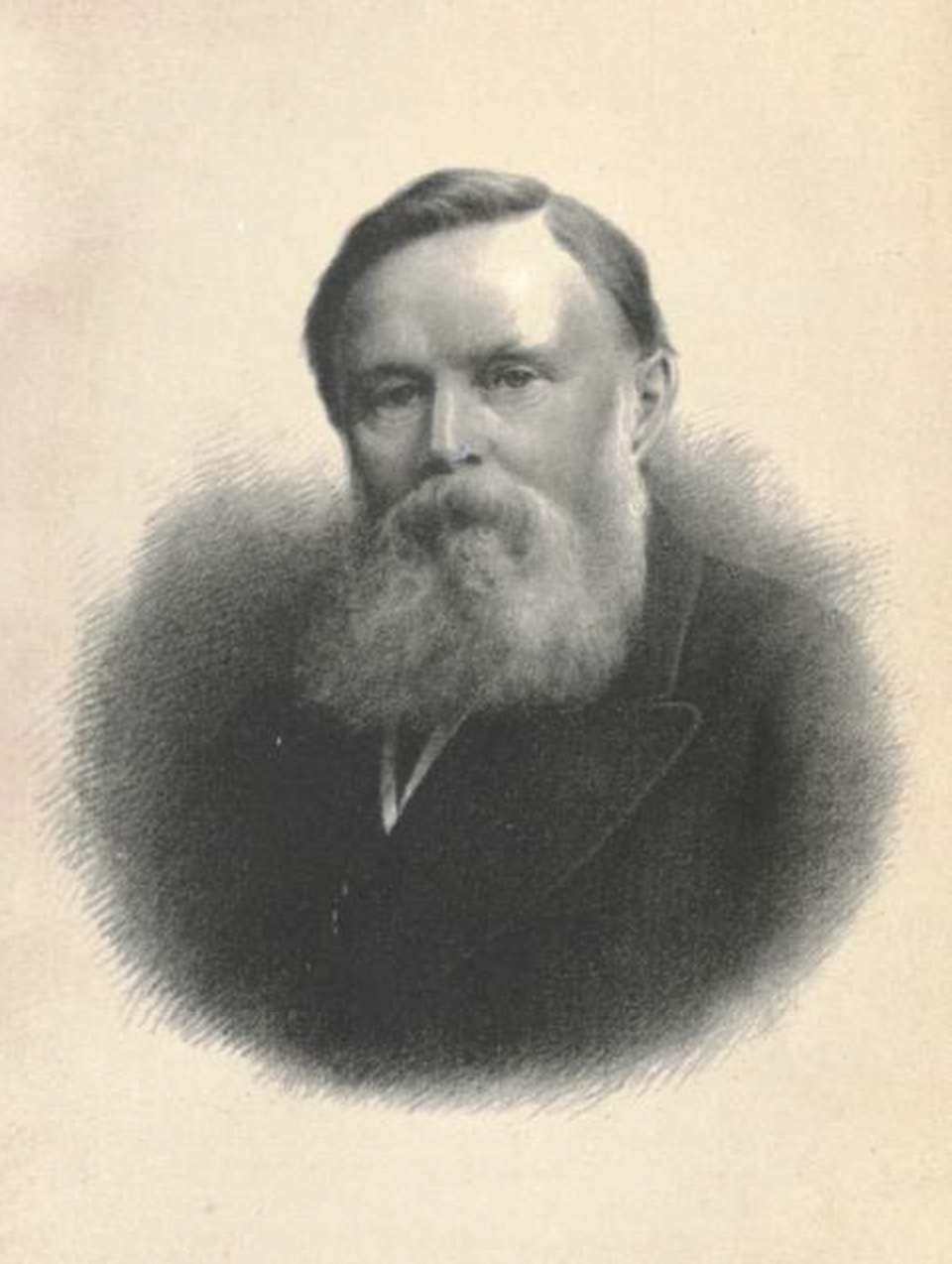
- Born: 9 December 1814; Woodside, Aberdeen, Scotland
- Died: 28 July 1886 (aged 71); St Leonards-on-Sea, England
- Resting place: Kirk of St Nicholas, Aberdeen
- Children: 3
- Engineering career
- Employers: Royal Arsenal; Royal Small Arms Factory; Waltham Abbey Royal Gunpowder Mills
- Projects: HMFF Chasseur

Sir John Anderson FRSE KB (9 December 1814 - 28 July 1886) was a Scottish engineer and inventor best known for revolutionising the production of armaments at the Royal Arsenal.

== Career ==
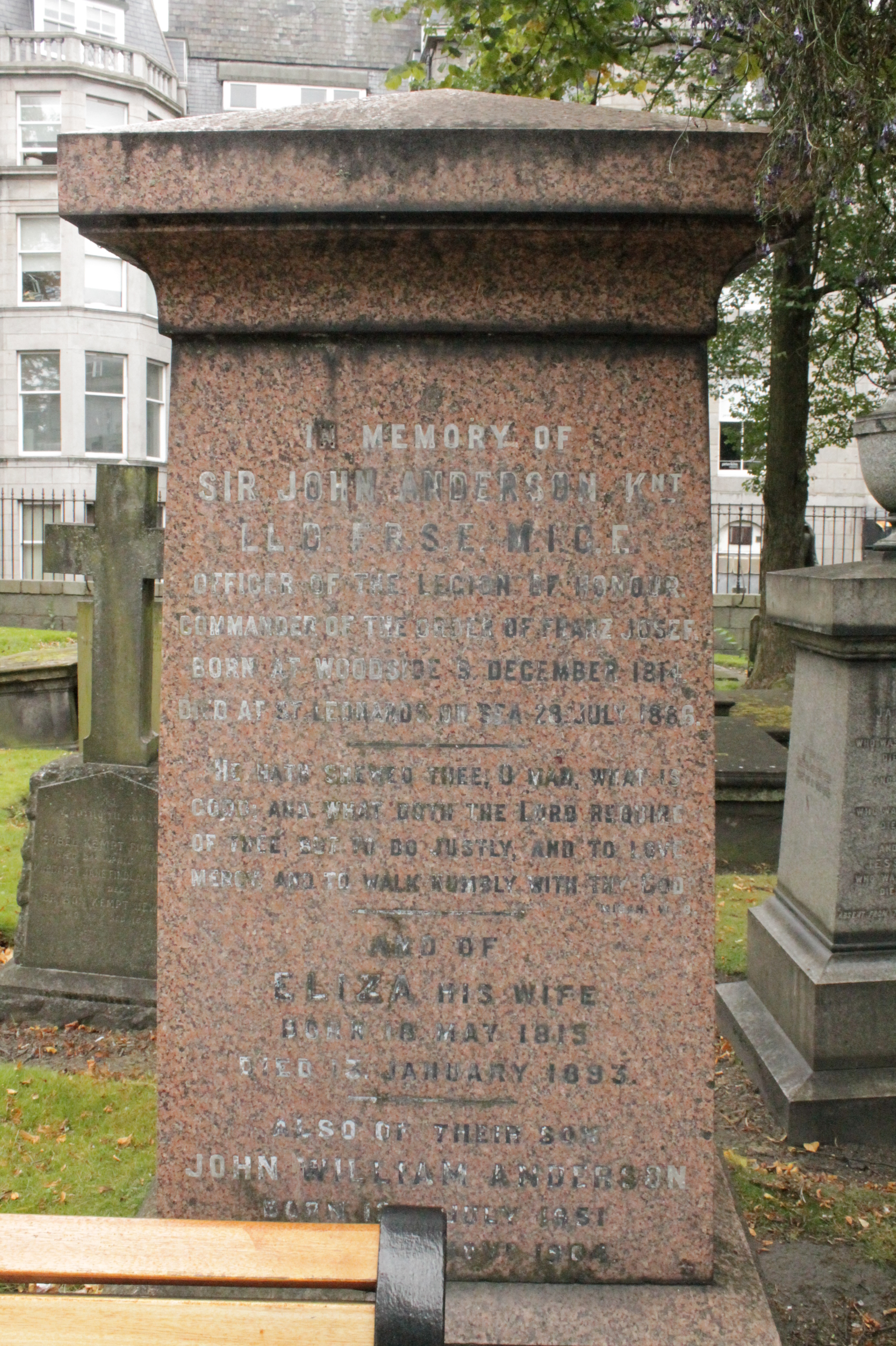
The grave of Sir John Anderson FRSE in the churchyard of the Kirk of St Nicholas

He was born in Woodside, Aberdeen on 9 December 1814 the son of John Anderson (d.1814), an Aberdeen merchant, and his wife, Helen Hosie. His father died just before his birth. He was educated at Brae School in Woodside. He was apprenticed as an engineer at age 14 under his stepfather Irvine Kempt.

In 1842 on the recommendation of David Napier he was given a position as a foreman at Royal Woolwich Arsenal. He rose to the position of Chief Inspector of munitions then in 1856 set up his own factory making shells to supply the Crimean War.

In 1870 St Andrews University awarded him a Doctor of Laws (LLD). He was knighted by Queen Victoria in 1878.

In 1871 he was elected a Fellow of the Royal Society. His proposer was Thomas Croxen Archer.

He died at St Leonards-on-Sea on 28 July 1886 and was buried in the churchyard of the Kirk of St Nicholas in central Aberdeen.

== Family ==
In 1840 he was married to Eliza Norrie (1815-1893).

== Publications ==
- Strength of Materials and Structures (1872)

== Awards ==
- 1871 - Honorary doctor of laws from the University of St Andrew
- Fellow of the Royal Society of Edinburgh
- Officer of the Legion of Honour
- Commander of the Order of Franz Joseph
- 1878 - Knight Bachelor
- 1881 - Freedom of the City of Aberdeen

== Legacy ==
Anderson gave £6,000 for the establishment of a public library in Woodside (now part of Aberdeen).
