= March Stones of Aberdeen =

Boundary marker stones

Coordinates: 57°08′19″N 2°05′41″W

Locations of stones recorded on Wikidata
- interactive map
- Clickable green discs mark locations where details and a photograph are on Wikidata. Red indicates a location lacking a photograph.

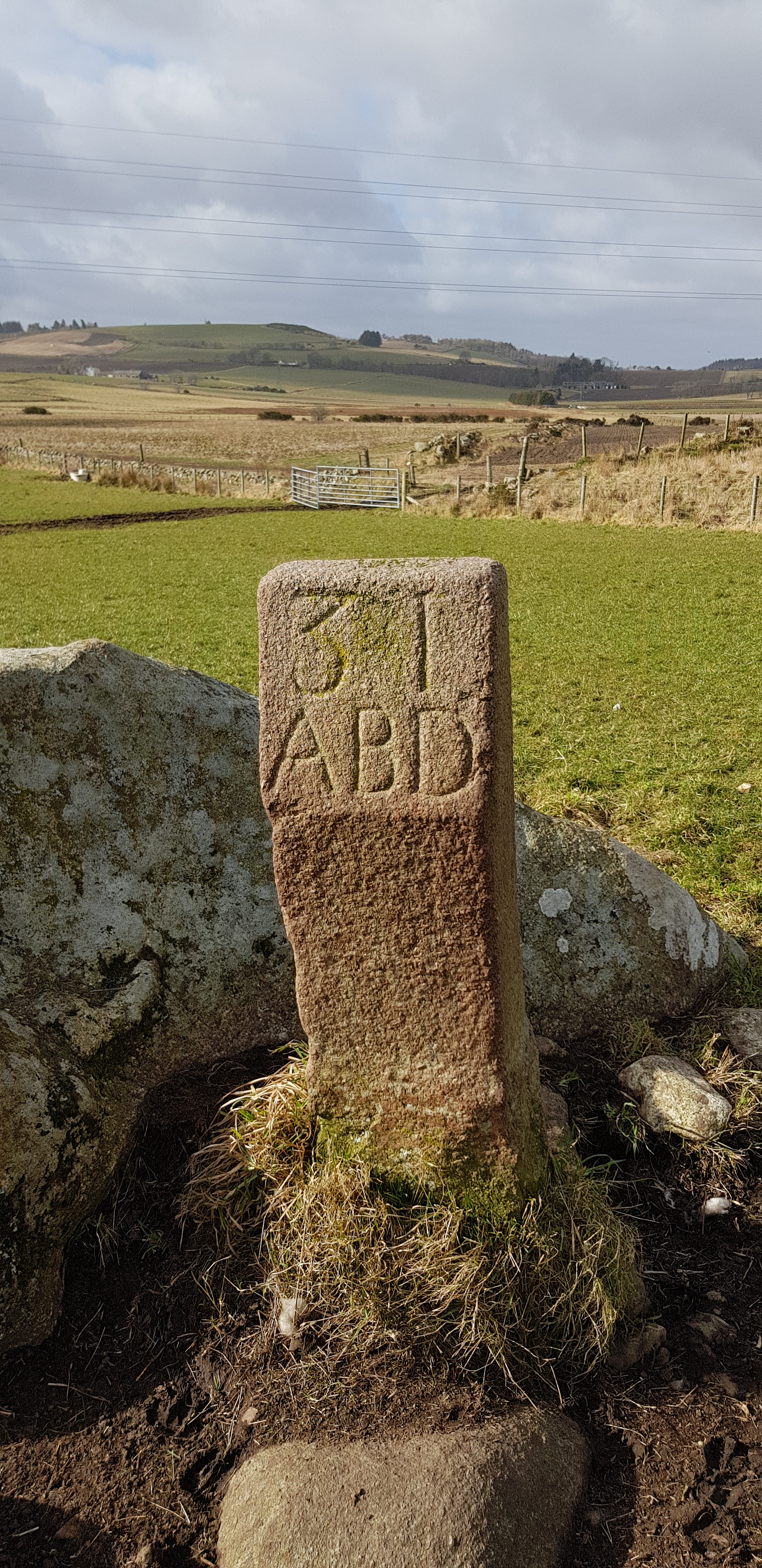
Outer stone number 31

The March Stones of Aberdeen are boundary marker stones encircling the land owned by the Scottish royal burgh, dating from before 1525.

In the 1300s Robert the Bruce granted the Royal Burgh of Aberdeen unusually strong rights over the burgh itself and the open lands outside the city. The land was valuable and so the boundary was marked out by the March Stones, "march" being the word used to describe a border area. In their first incarnation the March Stones were large standing stones and the boundary line was augmented with cairns or it ran along natural features such as streams. Because Aberdeen is an eastern coastal town the 26-mile (42 km) line of stones only encircled it to the west. To discourage encroachment the bounds were regularly ridden around by burgesses in the "riding of the marches", the Scots equivalent of beating the bounds, but eventually this became merely a ceremonial matter.

The area marked out, the so-called Freedom Lands of Aberdeen, lay outside the "City Royalty" – the urban area itself and the crofts just on its outskirts. One line of outer stones ran along the outer boundary of the Freedom Lands and a second line, the inner stones, was added in the early 19th century, marking the division of the royalty from the Freedom Lands.

The March Stones of Aberdeen were first written about in 1525 in connection with a riding of the marches. As time went by the stones themselves became marked for identification and between 1790 and 1810 new stones were installed with inscribed sequence numbers, sometimes alongside the earlier ones. Most of these later stones are still to be found although some are later replacements.

== Historical background ==
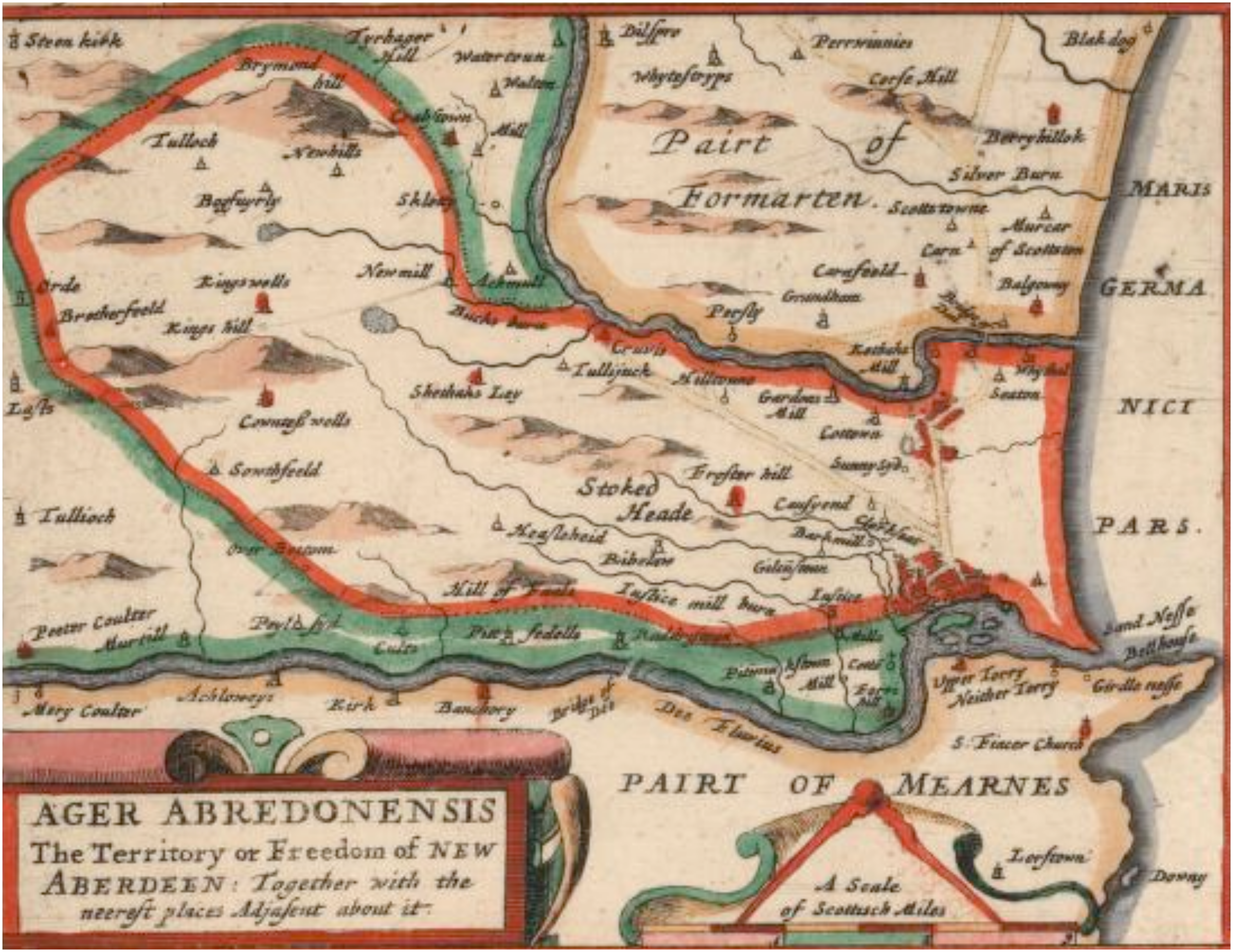
Freedom Lands, 1661 map by James Gordon of Rothiemay

The inhabitants of the Royal Burgh of Aberdeen had sheltered King Robert the Bruce and supported him militarily in 1308 at the Battle of Barra so in 1313 he granted the burgh burgesses custodianship of the Royal Forest of the Stocket, an extensive area of rough land just to the west of the town. (Note: The medieval term "forest" meant a royal hunting ground rather than a wooded forest. The Forest of Stocket is now the Midstocket part of the city.) although he retained his right for hunting and forestry. Six years later Bruce granted Aberdeen ownership rights over the Royal Burgh and Forest of Stocket for an annual rent, or feu, of £213 6s 8d pound Scots. (Note: £213 6s 8d pound sterling is often stated for what should be pounds Scots and indeed there was a confusion at the time, rectified in 1617 by a charter of James VI. The equivalent amount in pounds sterling would have been about £17 (equivalent to £18,478 in 2023).) The city burgesses later purchased three other areas of land: Rubislaw (bought 1379), Cruives, now Woodside (1405) and Gilcomston (1680). This land, along with the Stocket Forest, became called the Freedom Lands. (Note: Caprastone, now Hilton, was purchased in 1595 but never became part of the Freedom Lands.) In 1551 the burgesses obtained from Mary Queen of Scots the right to rent out these lands, by this time an area of some 25 square miles (65 km^{2}), (Note: The area including the royal burgh itself was about 30 square miles (78 km^{2}).) so that they could become privately managed for annual payments to the burgesses. (Note: Such estates maintain a current identity as Countesswells, Foresterhill, Hazlehead and Kingswells.) Hence these lands became the right and responsibility of the burgesses of the Royal Burgh of Aberdeen with the income accruing to the Aberdeen Common Good Fund.

== Boundary markers ==
Outer March Stone locations numbered in black. Inner stones, marked CR, numbered in magenta. (see also interactive map (Note: Clickable green discs mark locations where details and a photograph are on Wikidata. Red indicates a location lacking a photograph.))

In the 16th century a border region was called a march and the first boundary markers of the march of the Freedom Lands were probably natural features supplemented with small cairns. The earliest description of the marches was in 1525 concerning a "riding of the marches", the Scots equivalent of beating the bounds. This greatly ceremonial practice had its origins in ensuring the boundaries were not being encroached upon by neighbouring landowners.

In 1525 there was no standard system of marking. Any large earthfast stones might have incorporated saucer shapes filled with lead sometimes embossed with the city's seal or might have a contained a varied number of holes. A 1578 description of March Stone 1 says the city's mark was engraved in the stone itself. After the 1673 riding, several cairns were ordered to be erected along part of the line of the marches.

== March Stones ==
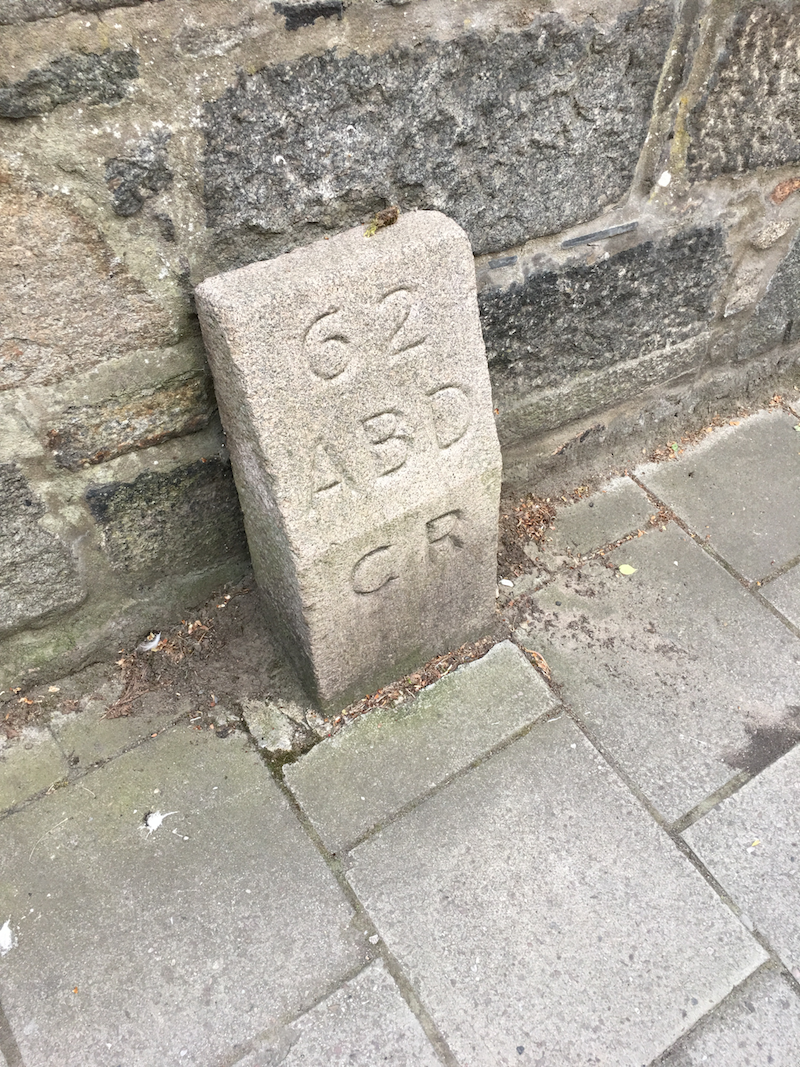
Inner stone number 62

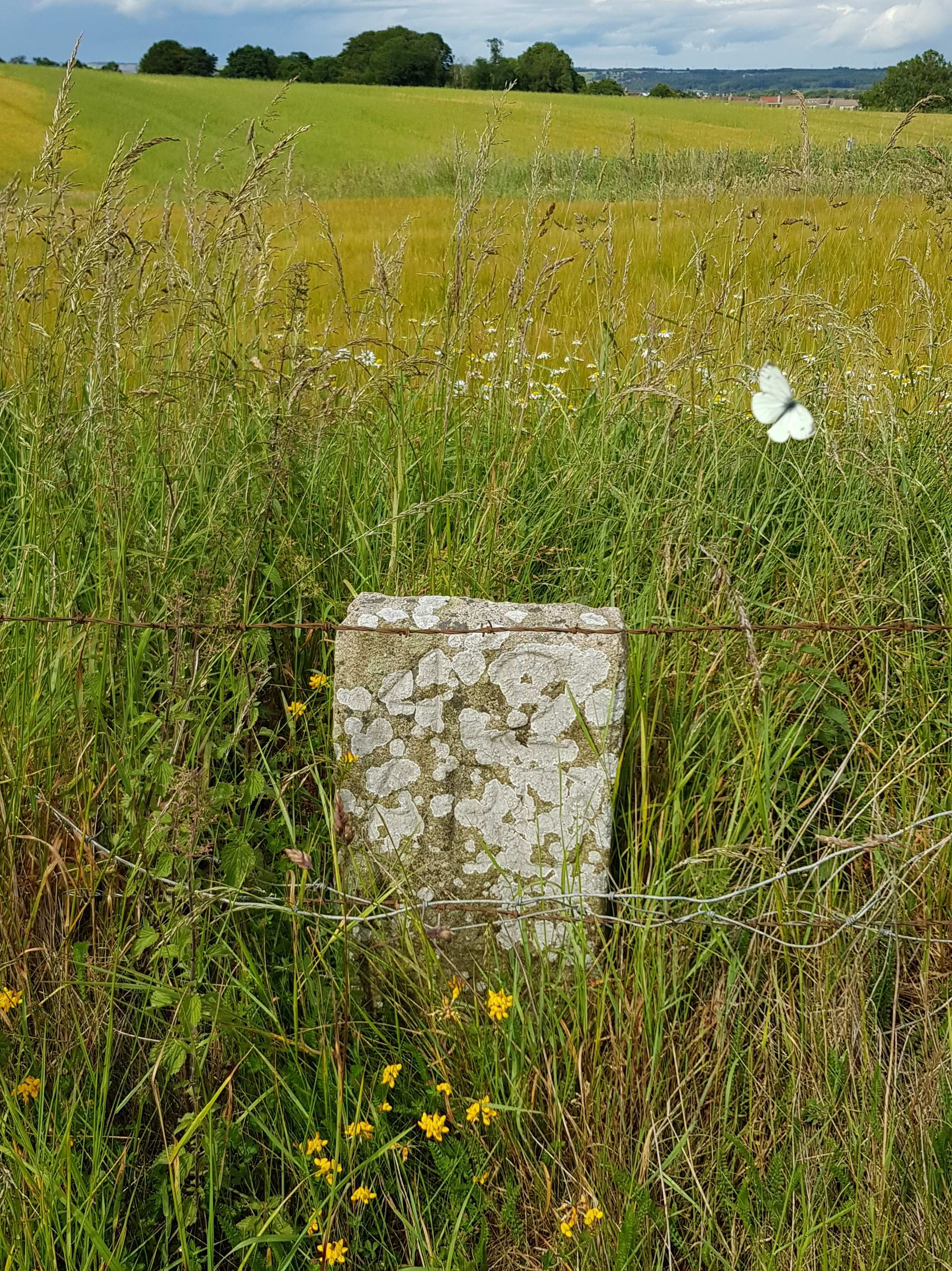
Outer stone number 42

After 1790 a new style of marking was adopted, one that the stones still display. The stones were inscribed with a sequential number followed by the letters "ABD" for Aberdeen. Aberdeen has two sets of march, or boundary, stones. The outer line surrounds the area of the Freedom Lands. The inner line of stones marks a smaller area: the boundary of the crofts immediately around the medieval Royal Burgh of Aberdeen. The land occupied by the crofts was known as the Burgh Roods or the terrirtorium croftorum burgi. The inner area as a whole, including the town itself, was called the City Royalty and the inner stones marking its boundary were marked with an additional "CR". This systematic style of marking was completed by 1810 but the new stones were not always in the same locations as the previous ones. In particular, where natural boundaries such as burns had wandered, the stones were moved to match. Altogether there were 74 stones: the southernmost was inscribed Alpha, the northernmost Omega, and between them 65 had a number inscribed. Additionally seven others on the inner ring were simply lettered CR with no number. (Note: Croly and the Aberdeen Council's trail pamphlets all say there are six unnumbered stones. However, the trails pamphlets actually list seven.) The distance from Alpha to Omega along the outer line of stones is about 26 miles (42 km) extending from the estuary of the River Dee to that of the River Don. (Note: In 1929 Cruickshank and Gunn noted "From the mouth of the Tile Burn the boundary runs to the Don mouth, thence along the Beach to Dee mouth, and up the Dee to the mouth of the Ferryhill Burn, where the inner marches start. During the last century the Inner Marches between Hardgate and the Spital were defined at Intervals by wall marks "C.R." of which there are known to remain one at March Lane and one in Alford Lane in the back wall of Holburn Parish Church.")

== Individual stones ==
Cruickshank and Gunn, in their 1929 book The Freedom Lands and Marches of Aberdeen, provided details, photographs and a map of the individual March Stones. Their descriptions are accompanied by descriptions from Kennedy's Annals of Aberdeen. In 2021 Aberdeen City Council produced an updated pamphlet with similar information. (Note: The current pamphlet is anonymous but an earlier draft credits Chris Croly as historian.) None of the stones standing are the originals but some have the original stones lying beside them. (Note: According to Croly the stones with originals alongside are:16, 18, 23, 25, 29, 31, 32 and 33.) In urban areas some stones have been laid flush to the ground. The numbering of the selection of stones in this article follows that used in the publications mentioned.

=== Inner stones ===
City Royalty stones, from south to north
| # stone inscription | Description |
|---|---|
| 66; Ά ABD CR | Alpha stone: at southern end of inner ring of stones where Ferryhill Burn joins the River Dee at its north bank. Early 19th century replacement. Kennedy's Annals (1818), when quoting from a 1698 source, did not mention such a stone. |
| 1 CR 1 ABD | southern joining point of outer and inner rings. In 1525 "ane gret grey stane, with ane sawssir" (Note: "Ane gret grey stane, with ane sawssir" (Scots) is "a great, grey stone with one saucer". Some of the stones had saucer-shaped indentations to mark them.) but replaced by late 18th century. |
| 68–74 | inscribed CR but without any number. Stone 73 pictured. |
| 61; 61 ABD CR | northern joining point of outer and inner rings. |
| 67; Ω ABD CR | Omega stone: at northern end of inner ring of stones at the confluence of Tile Burn and the River Don, south bank. A stone was certainly at this location by 1698. |

=== Outer stones ===
Freedom Lands stones, clockwise from south to north
| # stone inscription | Description |
|---|---|
| 3; 3 ABD | in 1780 "a large earthfast stone". |
| 8; 8 ABD | as recently as 1929 there was a saucer-marked stone. |
| 27; 27 ABD | called the "Ringing Stone". The distance of two miles to the next stone is demarked by the Brodiach burn. In 1525 "And frathin to the Rigand Stane liand at the Furde beside the Ord" but now replaced. |
| 31; 31 ABD | the "Doupin' Stone'. At one time new burgesses were "doupit" (dropped) on the stone which now lies beside the current marked stone. |
| 32; 32 ABD | beside the stone lies the original with a saucer-shaped depression. |
| 38 & 39 | present in 2011 when it was noticed they were very near to the then-proposed alignment of the Aberdeen Western Peripheral Route. During survey work for the new road in May 2012 the stones (category B listed in the listed buildings in the parish of Newhills) could not be located and were reported missing. |
| 56; 56 ABD | the sharp bend at this stone was to avoid the Den of Kittybrewster ("den" is ravine or glen) which had been filled in by 1929. |

== See also ==
- Crabstane of Aberdeen – a boundary stone in Aberdeen marking an estate boundary
- Lang Stane, Aberdeen – a boundary stone or a stone from a stone circle
