= James Cromar Watt =

Scottish artist

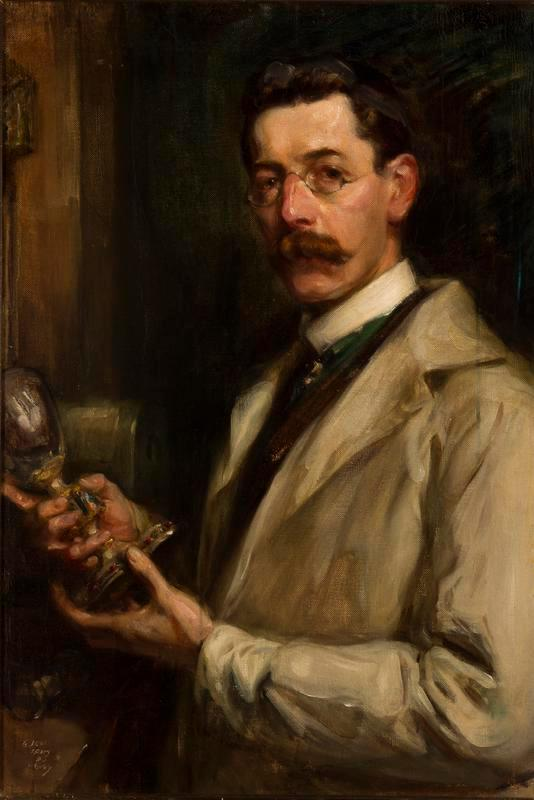
- Born: 14 July 1862; Aberdeen
- Died: 19 November 1940 (aged 78); Aberdeen
- Known for: Jewellery, architecture
- Awards: LLD, conferred by the University of Aberdeen

James Cromar Watt (14 July 1862 – 19 November 1940) was a Scottish artist, architect and jeweller.

== Early life ==
Watt was born in Aberdeen, Scotland, to parents Ann Hardy (a schoolteacher), and advocate's clerk Alexander Watt. He attended Aberdeen Grammar School between 1875 and 1879, after which he trained as an architect with W&J Smith in Aberdeen.

== Career ==
In addition to W&J Smith, Watt also worked for George Aitchison in London, moving there in 1887 before returning to Aberdeen. He took various study tours: Belgium and Germany between May and June 1886, Italy and Sicily in 1890 -1891, and Greece in 1893.

In the 1890s he transitioned from architecture to working in jewellery and enamel. His enamel work was part of the first exhibition of the Scottish Society of Art Workers in 1899 in Glasgow. He exhibited at the Royal Glasgow Institute of the Fine Arts 58th Annual Exhibition in 1919, and the Aberdeen Artists' Society Exhibition of Works of Modern Artists in both 1919 and 1935.

Between 1900 and 1921, Watt exhibited 29 enamel plaques in Aberdeen Art Gallery, as part of the exhibitions of the Aberdeen Artists Society, and 21 pieces of jewellery in 1906.

He was granted an honorary degree in 1931 by the University of Aberdeen.

Examples of Watt's jewellery and enamel work

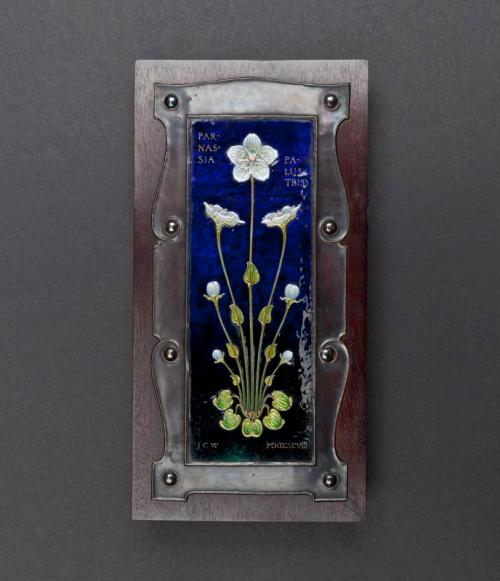
Enamelled Plaque

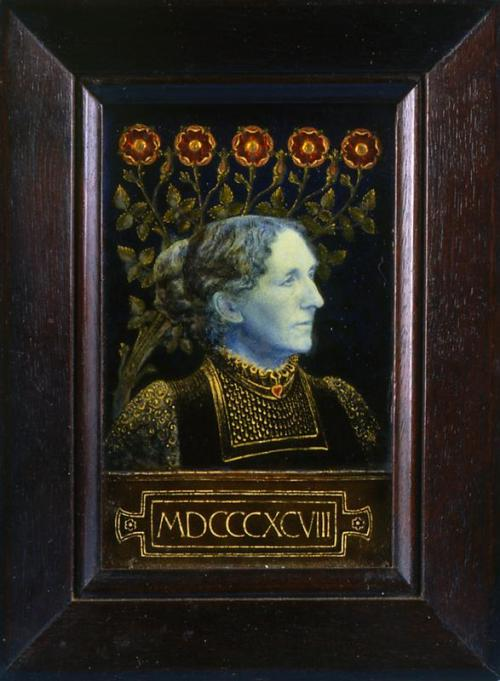
Enamelled Plaque - Mother

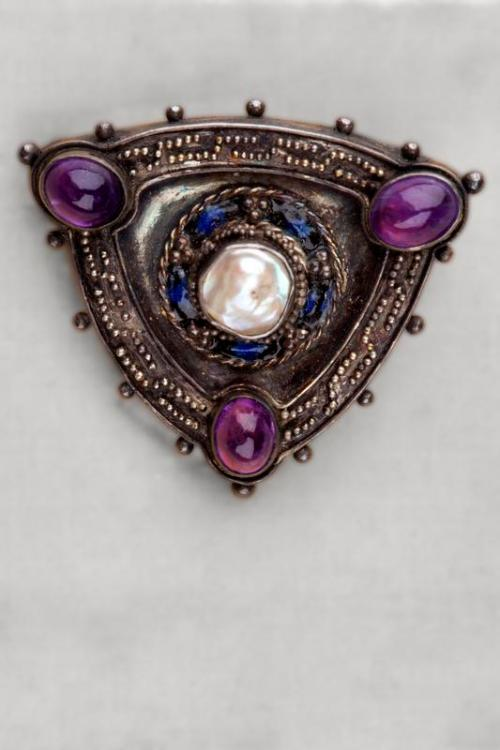
Shield shaped silver brooch

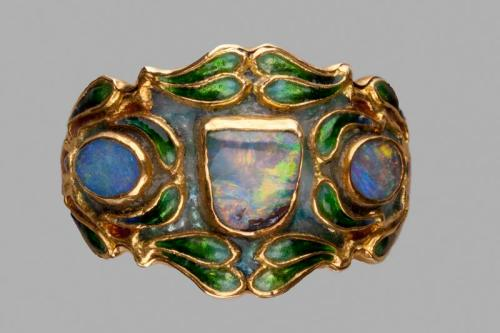
Scarf ring

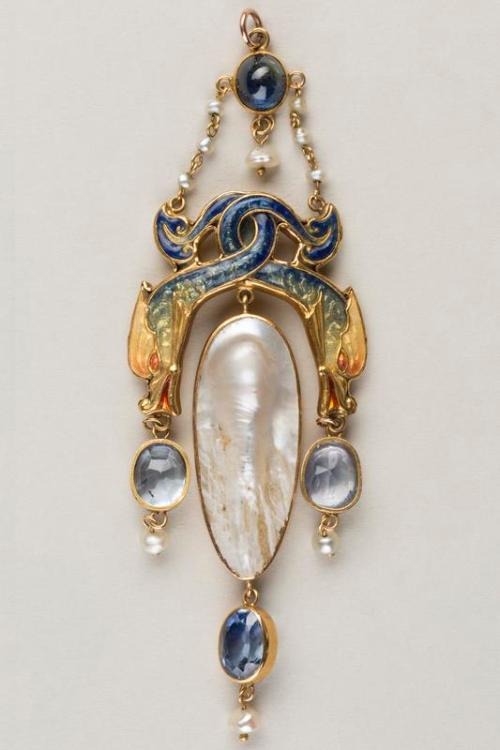
Dragon Pendant with Sapphires

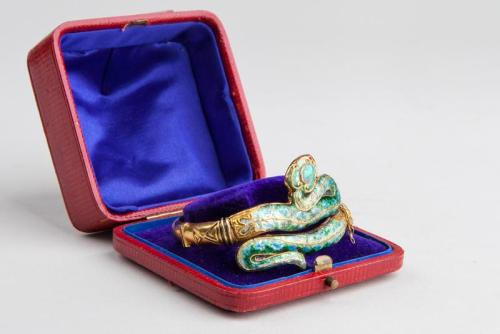
Gold and Enamel snake bangle

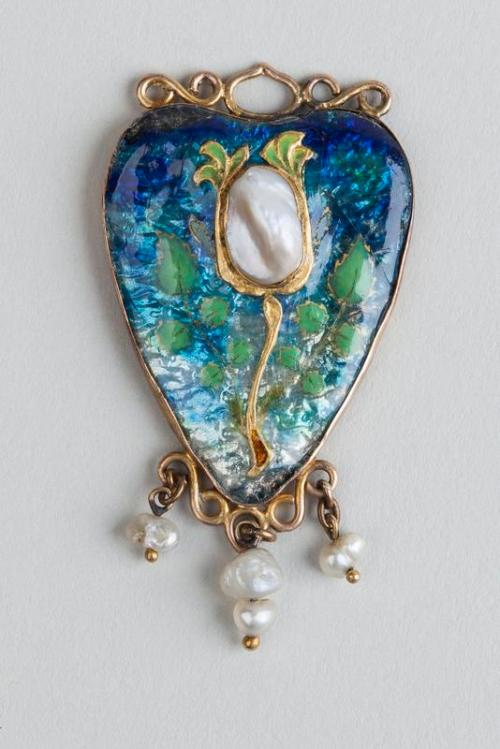
Heart Shaped Gold Enamelled Pendant (c.1907)

== War work and later life ==
During World War I, Watt worked for the government; however, the nature and detail of this work is unclear.

Watt was also interested in rare plants, which he grew at home.

Watt was involved in a street accident, and died from head injuries sustained as a result on 19 November 1940. His collections were divided between Aberdeen Art Gallery and the Royal Scottish Museum.
