= Spectra Festival of Light =

Annual arts festival in Aberdeen, Scotland (2015 - present)

SPECTRA
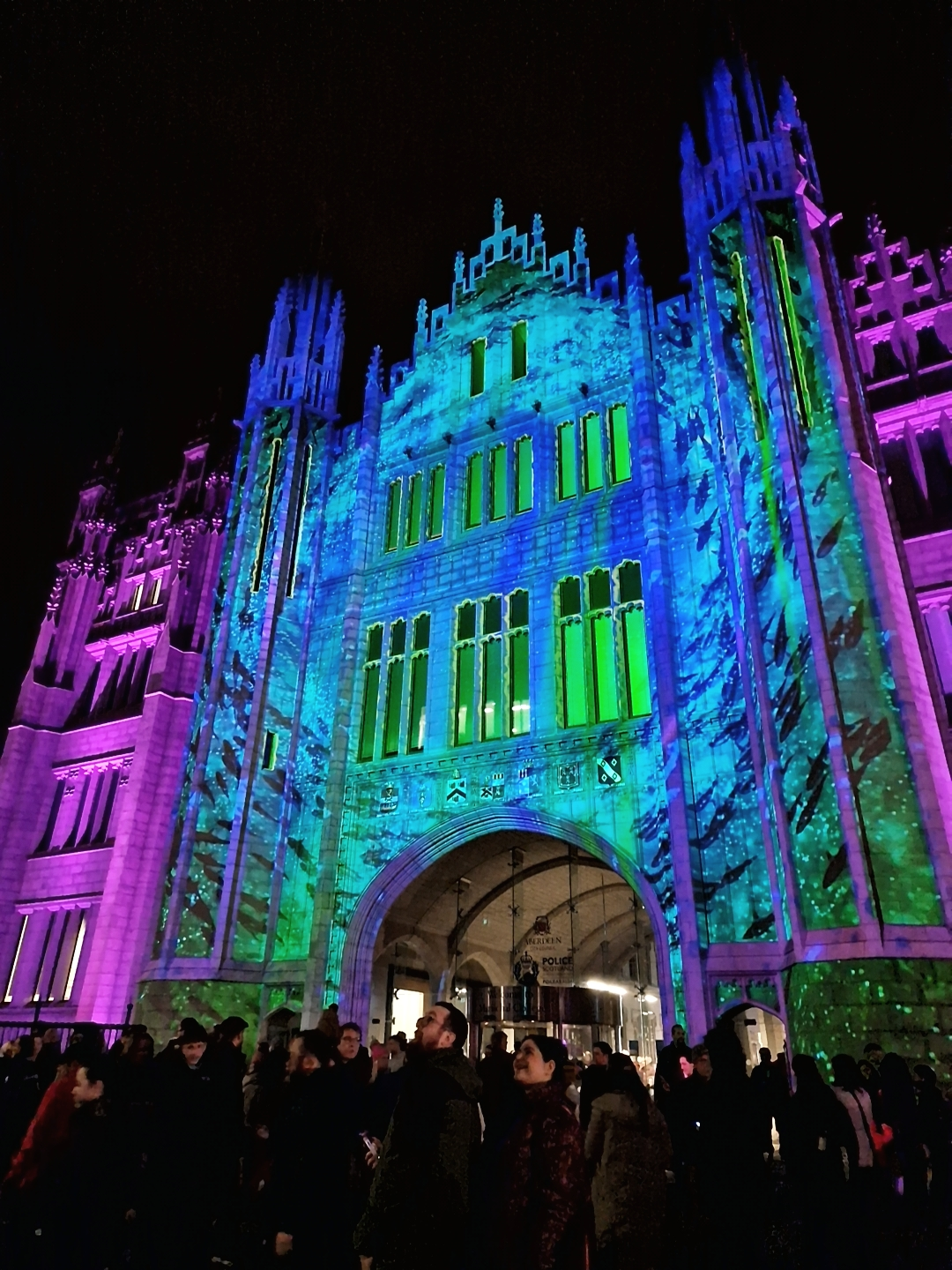
- Nøkken displayed on Marischal College, Aberdeen, during the 2023 SPECTRA Festival
- Status: Active
- Genre: Arts Festival
- Dates: 9–12 February 2023
- Frequency: Annual
- Location: Aberdeen
- Country: United Kingdom
- Inaugurated: 2015
- Most recent: 2023
- Next event: 2024
- Organiser: Live Event Management; Aberdeen City Council
- Free?: Yes
- Website: https://www.spectrafestival.co.uk/

Spectra, stylized as SPECTRA Scotland's Festival of Light (originally Aberdeen's Festival of Light), is an annual public arts festival held each year in Aberdeen, Scotland. The art installations are focused around light, often including sculptures, projections, and installations.

== History ==
Founded in 2014, the festival has taken place annually in February. From 2015, Aberdeen City Council appointed Curated Place, an arts-led cultural production agency to produce and deliver the event.

=== 2014 ===
A pilot event, coordinated by Aberdeen-based Peacock Visual Arts, took place from 6 to 9 February 2014 with the tagline "Aberdeen Festival of Light"

=== 2015 ===
Participating artists included Jørgen Callesen, Jacob Takeila, Einkofi Productions and Steinunn. Locations included Union Terrace Gardens and His Majesty's Theatre.

=== 2016 ===
The event ran from 11 to 14 February 2016. Its main space was in Union Terrace Gardens, with other exhibitions added in Marischal College, St Nicholas Kirkyard, and Seventeen on Belmont Street.

=== 2017 ===
The event took place between 9 and 12 February 2017. It added the Rooftop Garden of the St Nicholas Centre as an exhibition space. It won Festival of the Year 2017 in the Drum awards. It also was voted best family event of the year by Raring2go! magazine.

=== 2018 ===
The festival took place from 8 to 11 February 2018. Its theme was "Play in the Night" in tribute to Creative Scotland and Event Scotland’s Year of Young People. Union Terrace Gardens hosted 15 installations, and the front of His Majesty's Theatre was used as a projection surface.

=== 2019 ===
There was no Spectra Festival in 2019, due to the contract lapsing.

=== 2020 ===
Spectra returned to Aberdeen in 2020, with displays including tentacles perched on buildings around the city in addition to the usual light displays. Taking its inspiration from Scotland’s Year of Coasts and Waters, Spectra 2020 explored Aberdeen’s position as the connecting point to other cultures on Scotland’s North East coast.

=== 2022 ===
After the festival was cancelled in 2021, due to the COVID-19 pandemic, Spectra returned to the City in 2022 with a theme of "Scotland’s Year of Stories."

=== 2023 ===
The theme for the latest incarnation of the Festival, held from 9 to 12 February, was "Home". Ashley Davis described the festival as "what is best in the Granite City" in The Times. Queues of up to 45 minutes were reported as residents and visitors to Aberdeen visited the festival.

=== 2024 ===
The 2024 festival ran from 8 to 11 February 2024. It celebrated 10 years of the event.

=== 2025 ===
This iteration of the festival took place between 6 and 9 February 2025. It included 15 installations including works by Council Baby and Johanna Basford OBE.

=== 2026 ===
The most recent occurrence took place from 5 to 8 February 2026 with installations in Union Terrace Gardens, Aberdeen Art Gallery, St Nicholas Kirkyard, Marischal Square and on Broad Street.

The Stage Of Light, featuring multiple musical artists, was to take place on the rooftop garden of St Nicholas shopping centre. Owing to bad weather, this was moved to Cowdray Hall, and storytelling sessions planned for there were in turn relocated to a barbers' shop on Schoolhill. The festival sponsors were LNER, Vattenfall, and Shore Porters Society.

== Attendance ==
Spectra's attendance figures have been reported as follows.

Year	Attendance
2014	unknown
2015	8,000 (est)
2016	35,000 (est)
2017	63,286
2018	93,000 (est)
2020	c. 100,000 (est)
2022	c.116,000 (est)
2023	c. 119,000 (est)
2024	100,000+ (est)
2025	100,000+ (est)
2026	unknown

== Gallery ==
Images from Spectra 2017 - 2025

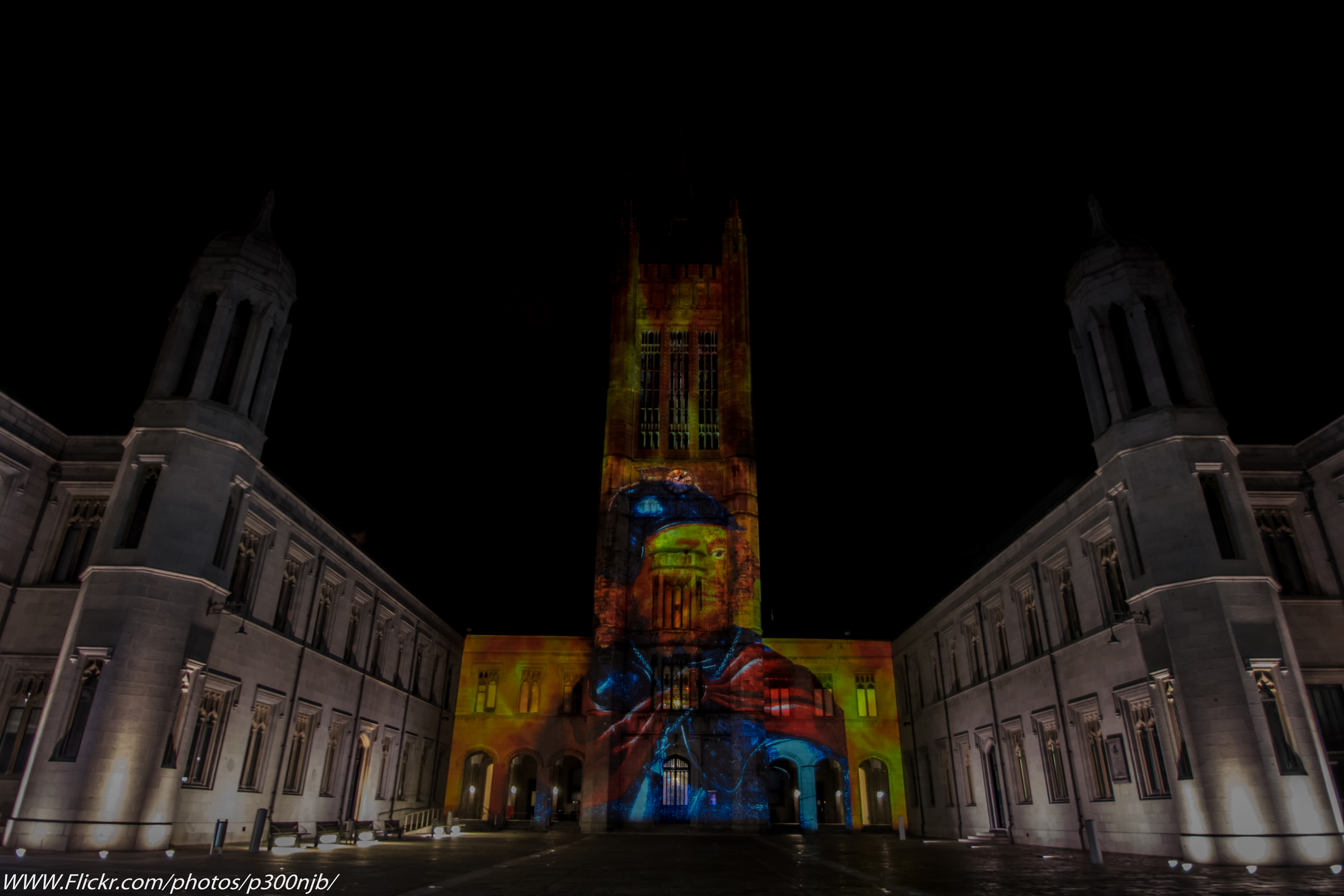
Spectra 2017 projection on Marishcal College

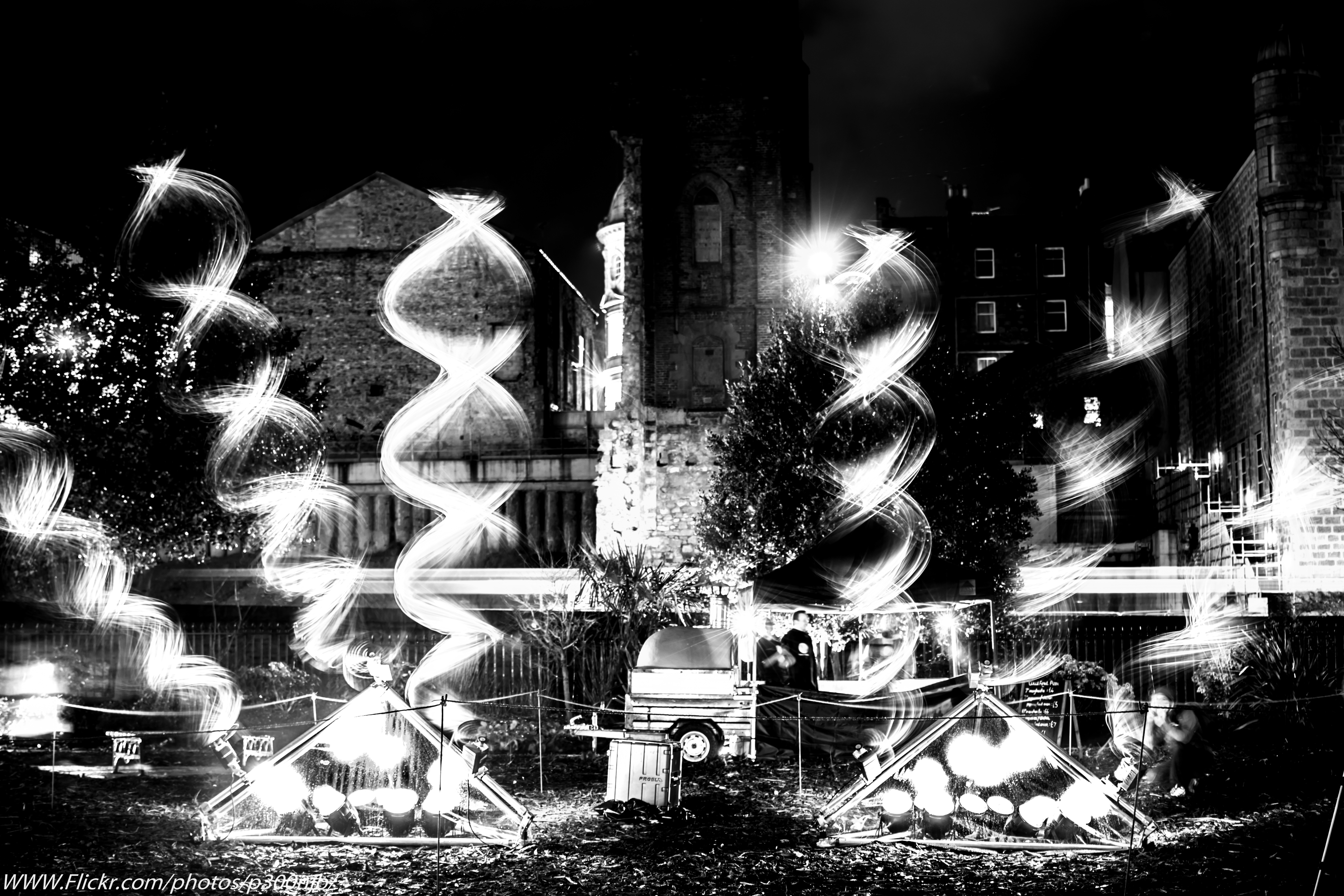
Paul Friedlander's Wave Garden in Aberdeen's Union Terrace Gardens, as part of Spectra Scotland's Festival of Light in 2017.

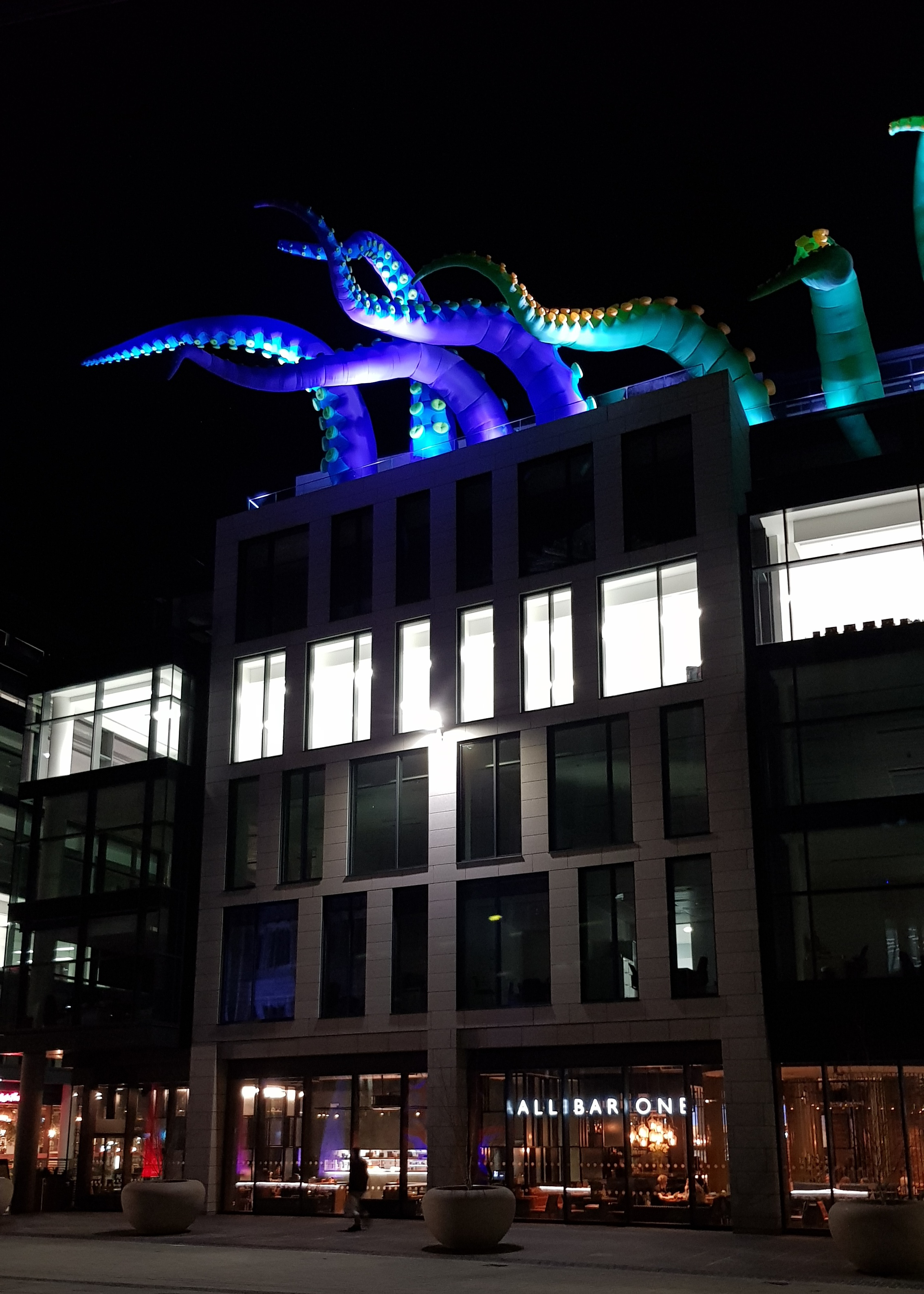
Tentacles over Marischal Square 2020

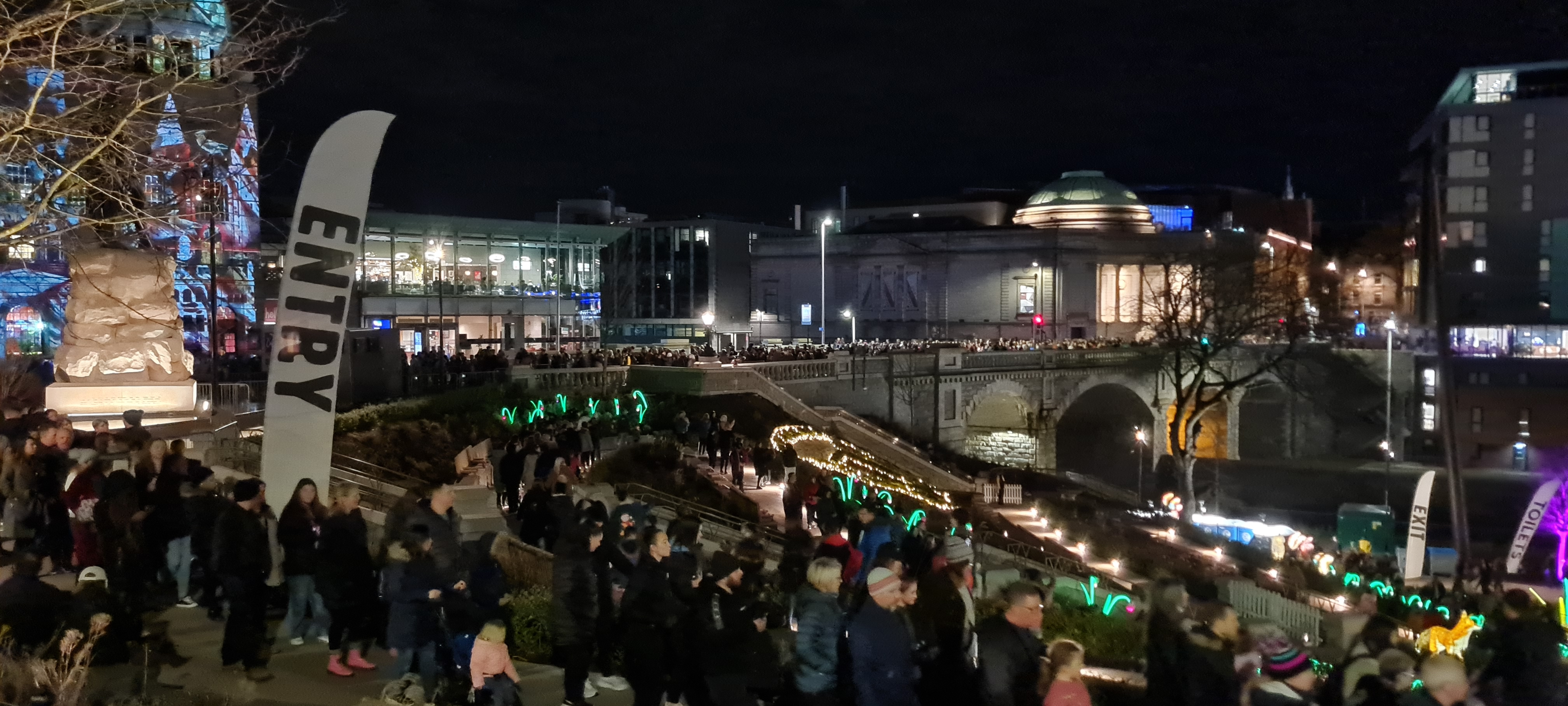
Entry to Spectra 2023

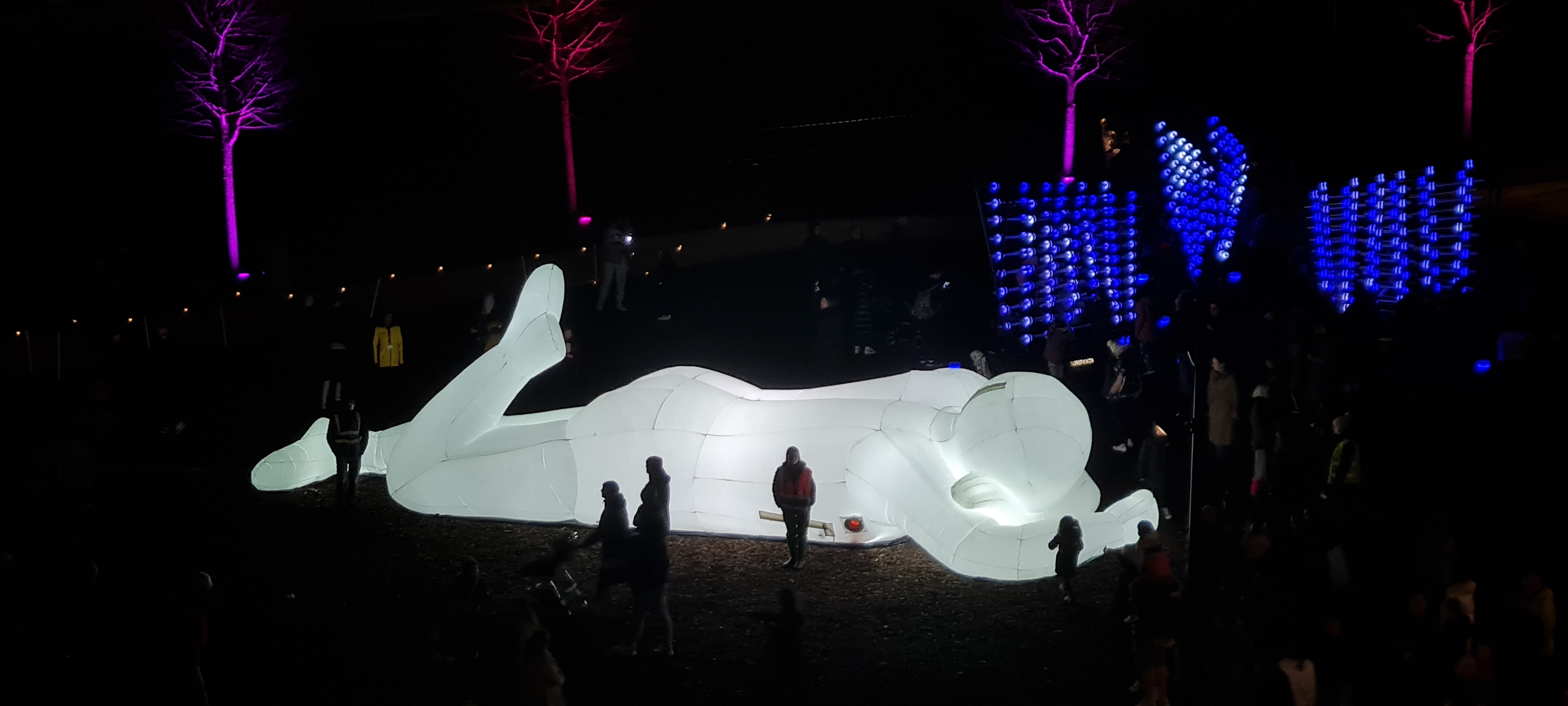
Figure, Union Square, 2023 Spectra

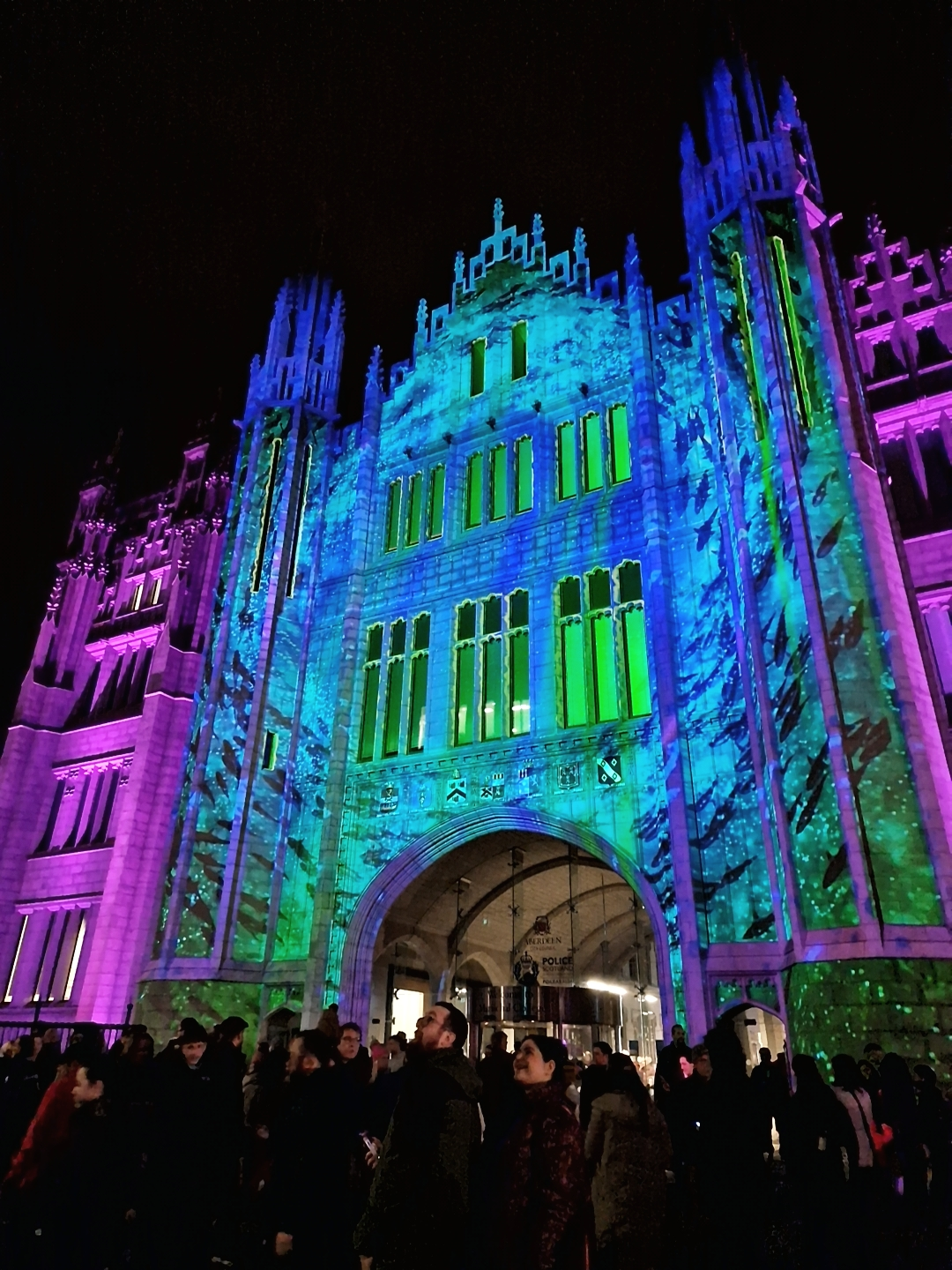
The Nøkken display on Marischal College, Aberdeen, 2023

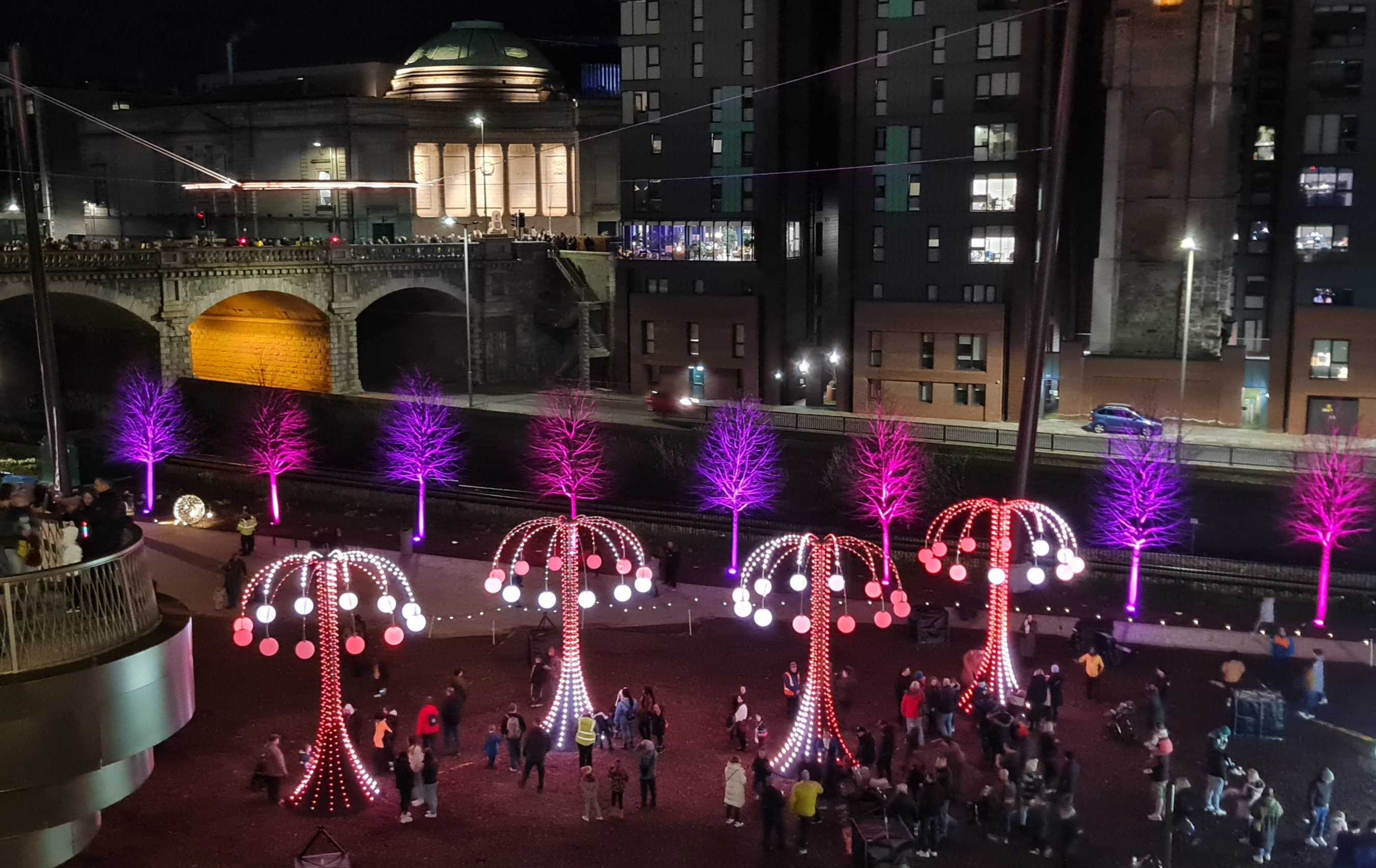
Spectra 2023 installation, UTG

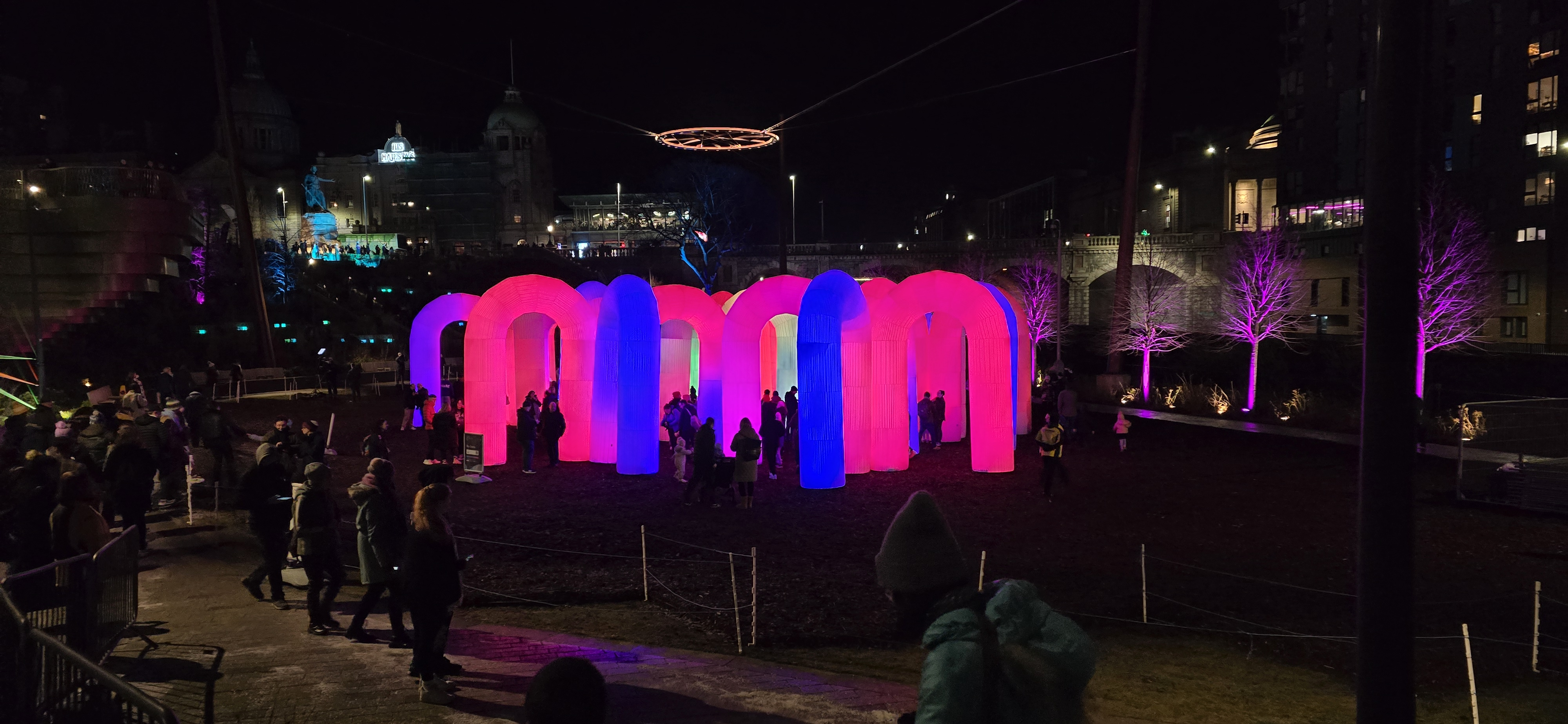
Sky Castle at Spectra 2025

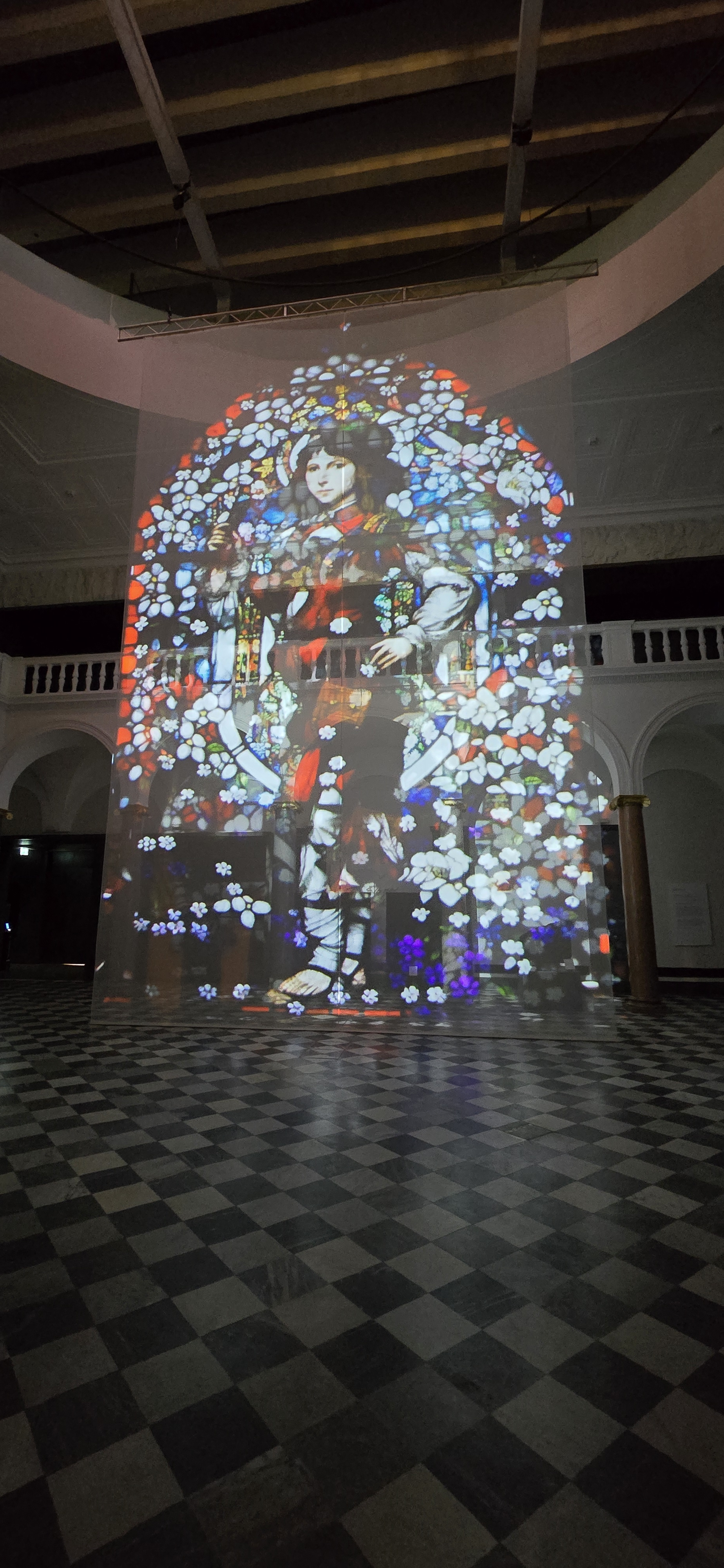
'Fit D'You Know About The Bon Accord' by Council Baby in Aberdeen Art Gallery, at Spectra 2025

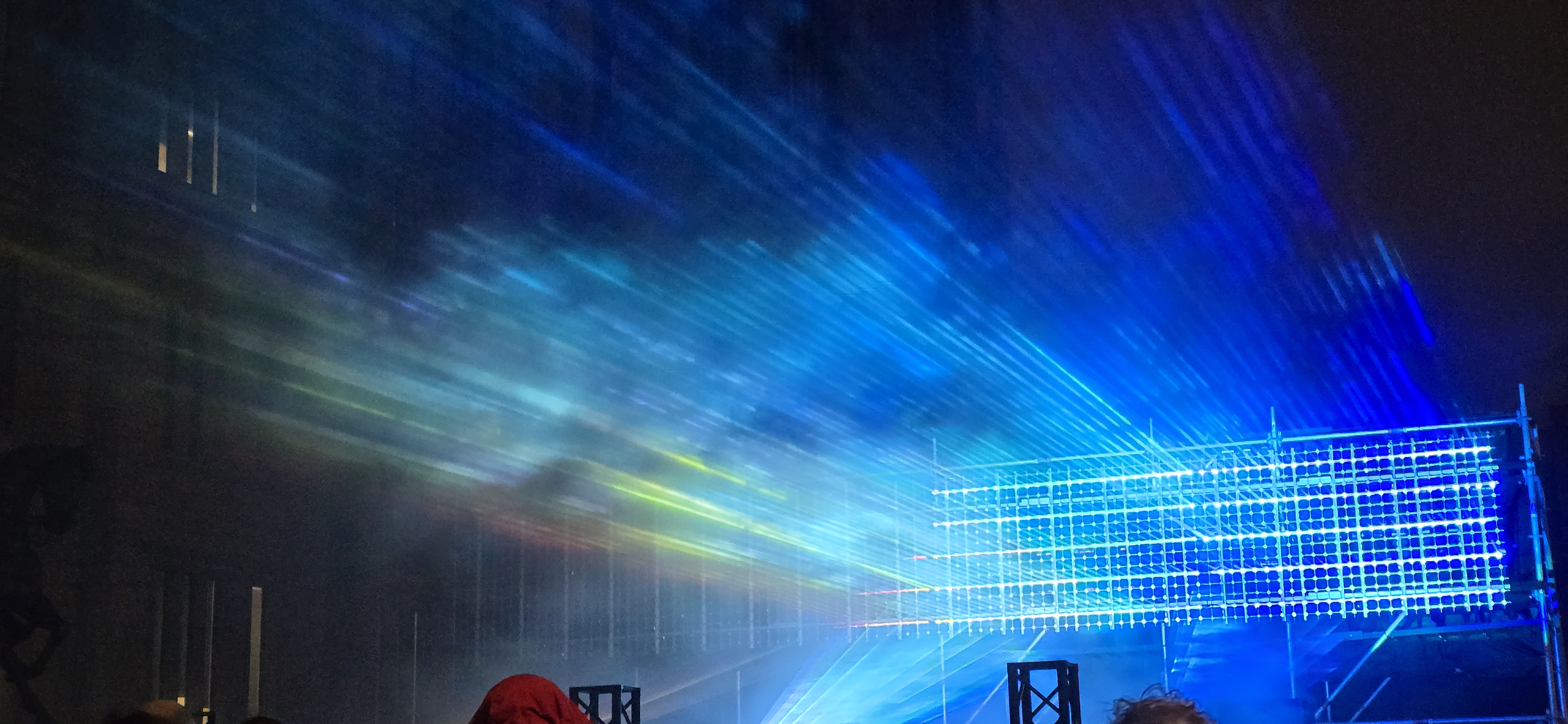
Parallels, by Architecture Social Club at Spectra 2026

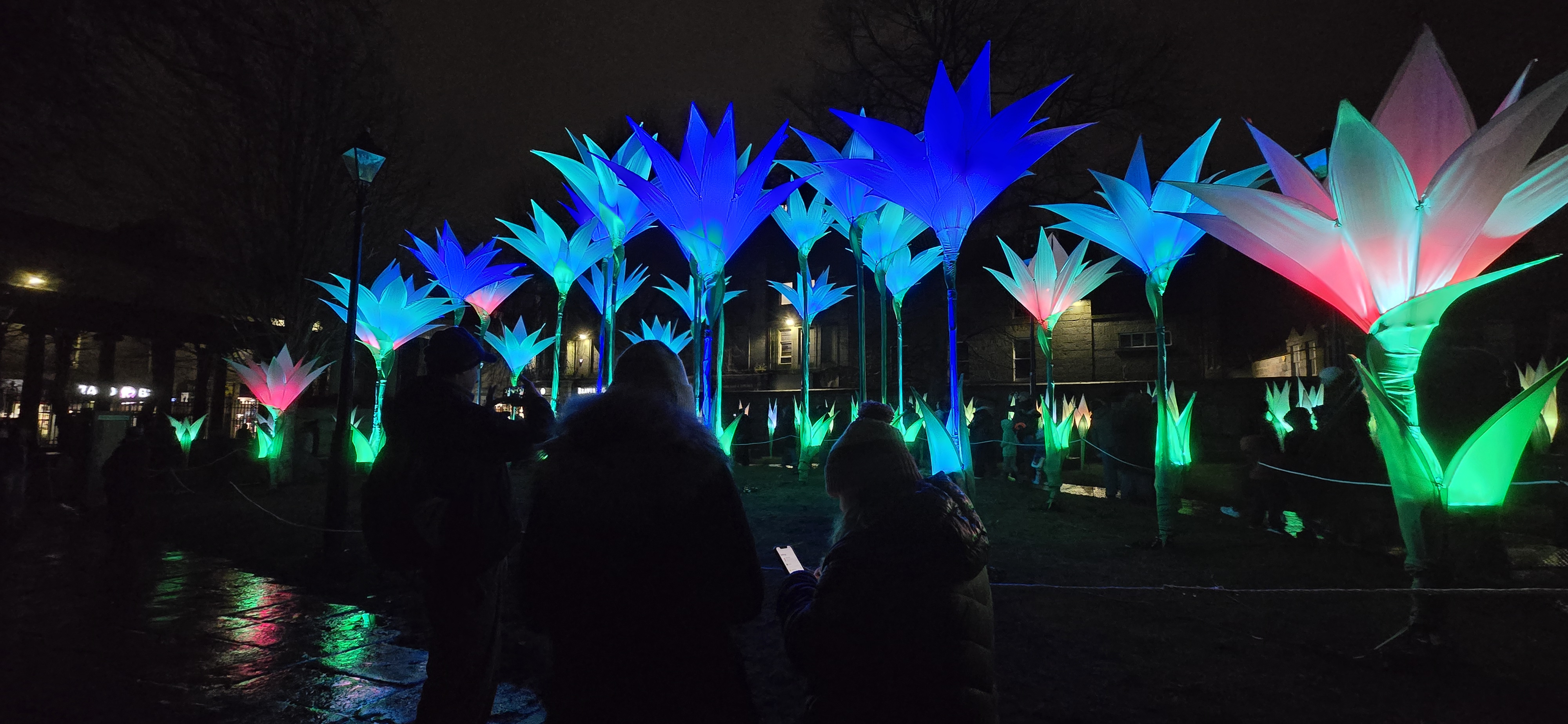
Flower Fields by Jigantics at Spectra 2026

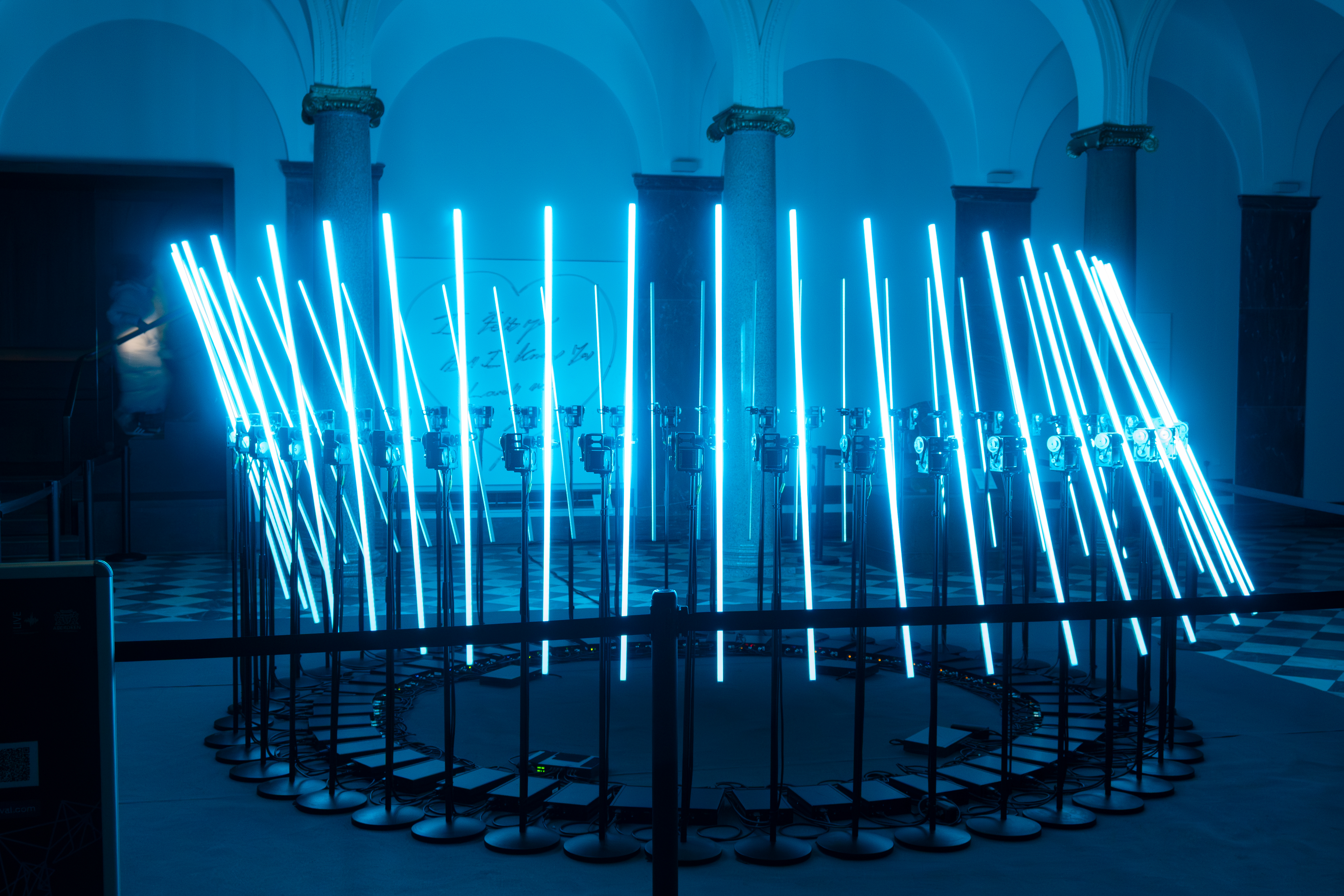
Flux by Collectif Scale at Spectra 2026
