= Aberdeen Market =

Former shopping mall in Aberdeen, Scotland

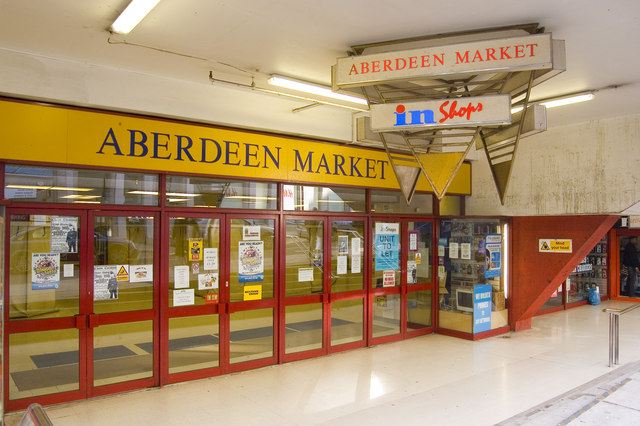
- Entrance to Aberdeen Market
- Location: Market Street and Union Street, Aberdeen, Scotland
- Coordinates: 57°8′46.78″N 2°5′52.23″W
- Opened: 29 April 1842 (original); 6 November 1974 (most recent building)
- Closed: 23 March 2020
- Owner: Aberdeen City Council

Aberdeen Market was a shopping centre which faced on to Market Street in Aberdeen, Scotland.

== History ==
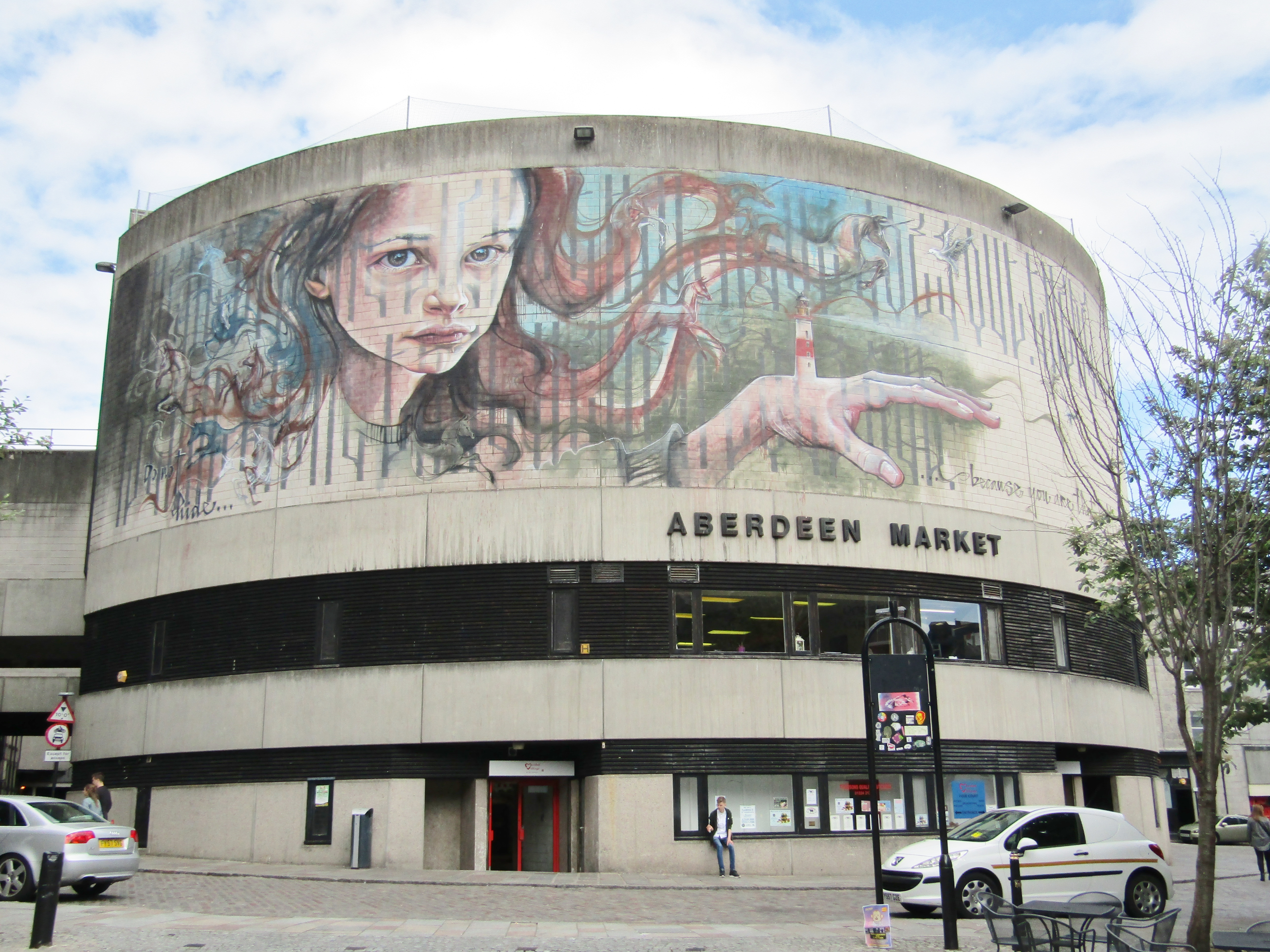
The NuArt artwork

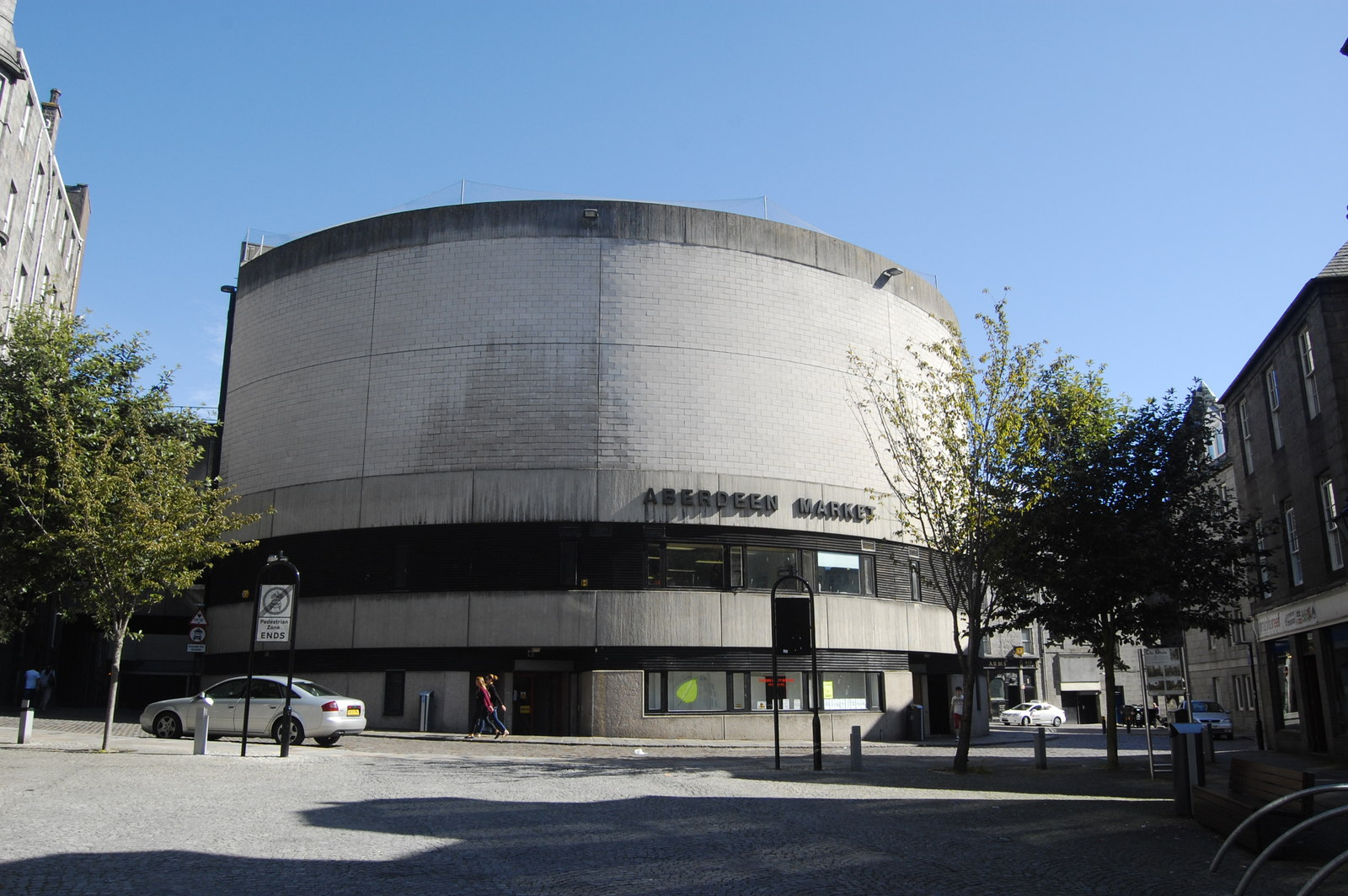
Exterior of the Market

The first indoor market on this spot was opened on 29 April 1842, but was destroyed by fire exactly 40 years later. It was rebuilt, and demolished again in 1971. The most recent building was opened on 6 November 1974 by William McEwan Younger.

The British Home Stores branch closed in August 2016 following the collapse of the chain.

A large mural was painted on the curved face of the building by the duo Herakut in 2017 as part of the NuArt Festival.

In 2018, the owners of the market building and the adjacent British Home Stores unit, Rockspring (now Patrizia AG), submitted a planning application for permission to clad the existing building and increase the number of windows. Concerns were raised at the time over the potential loss of the NuArt mural painted a year earlier. The proposals never went ahead, however later that year, another proposal was launched that would see the building demolished and a replacement built in its spot.

The centre ultimately closed along with all non-essential shops in March 2020 as part of the COVID-19 lockdown in the United Kingdom. On 11 June, the operator of the building, Aberdeen Market Village, went into liquidation. The following year, the building along with the connected BHS store were purchased by Aberdeen City Council.

== Shops ==
The market contained various independent retailers. Following its closure, several tenants moved to different locations in the city centre, including the Thai restaurant Madame Mews, the DIY shop Nickel and Dime, and the LGBT+ charity Four Pillars.

== Redevelopment ==
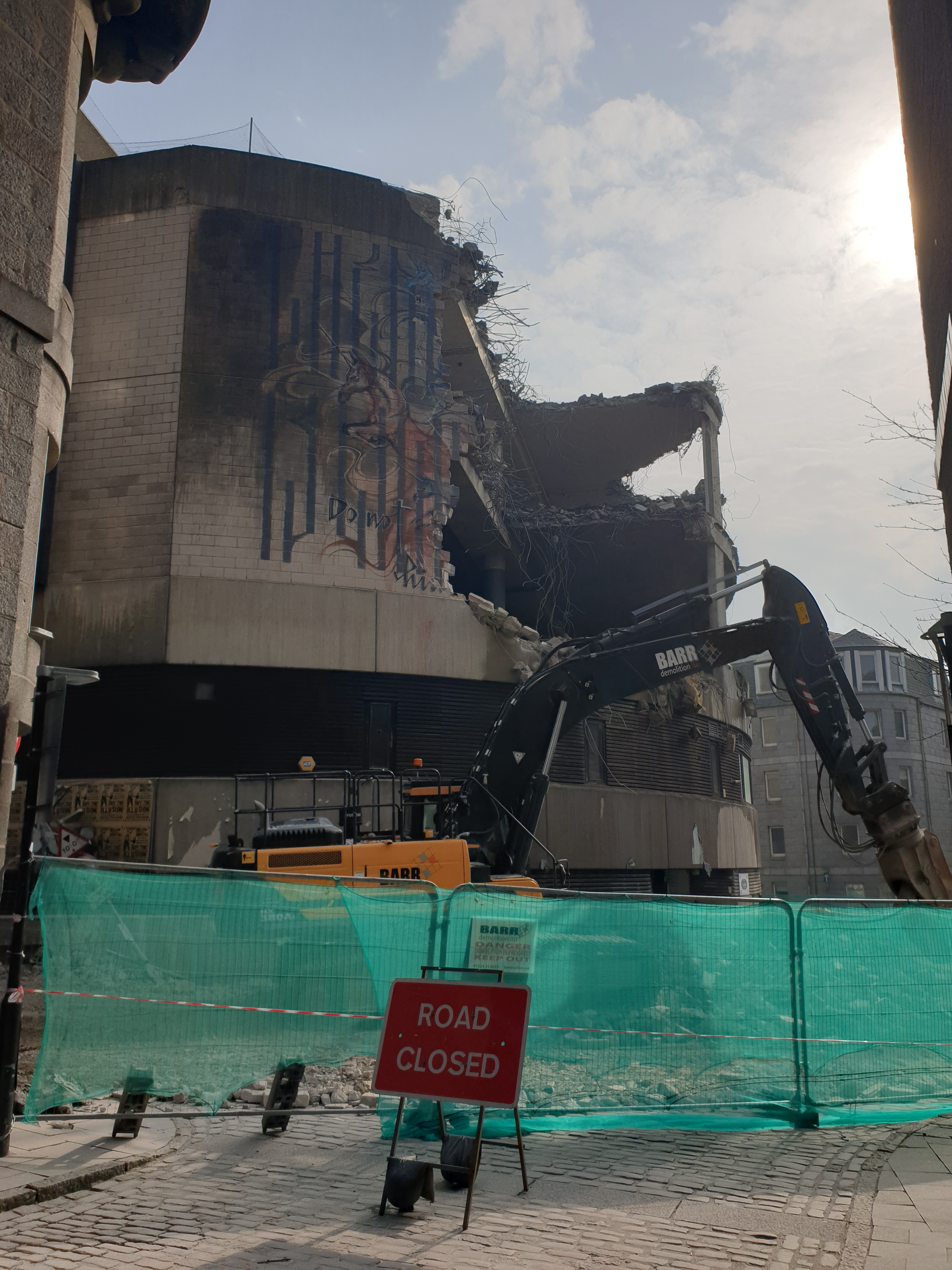
Demolition work underway

In May 2021, a proposal was published that would see Aberdeen City Council purchase the market and the former BHS store. The property would be demolished and replaced with a partially open-air space for retail, food and drink, and leisure.

Plans to demolish the market were criticised by the local branch of the Architectural Heritage Society of Scotland due to the environmental impact of demolition and constructing a replacement building.

In October 2021, it was announced that the UK Government would contribute £20 million towards the redevelopment of the market, which is expected to cost £75 million in total.

Demolition work was underway by March 2022. On 22 March 2022, demolition of the curved wall with the mural began.
