= Doonies Farm =

Farm in Aberdeen, Scotland

Coordinates: 57.12181°N 2.05895°W

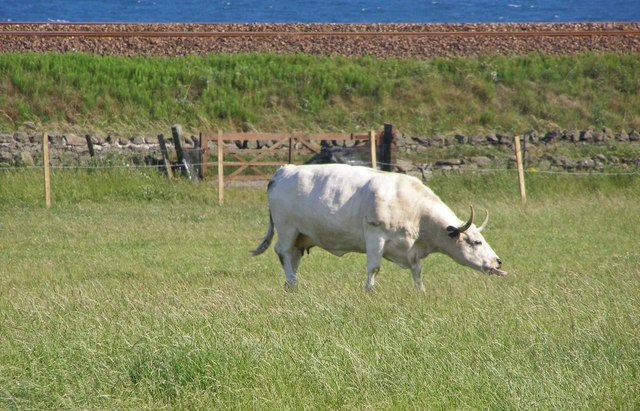
View across the fields towards the coast

Doonies Rare Breeds Farm was a farm in Aberdeen, Scotland that maintained a large collection of rare and endangered farm animal breeds. The farm occupied 134 acres and was nationally recognised as a breeding centre for rare breeds. There were 23 rare animal breeds on the farm, including pigs, cattle, sheep, horses, chickens and ducks. Young new arrivals such as lambs, calves, chicks and foals arrived at Easter time.

Doonies Farm stood on the coast, just past the old fishing village of Cove.

At the time of its closure, Doonies Farm operated as a family-run business, having previously been owned and operated by Aberdeen City Council for roughly 20 years. Doonies Farm closed on 21 August 2023 as a consequence of the nearby ETZ (Energy Transition Zone) being built by the council.
