= Aberdeen Art Gallery =

Visual arts exhibition space in the city of Aberdeen, Scotland

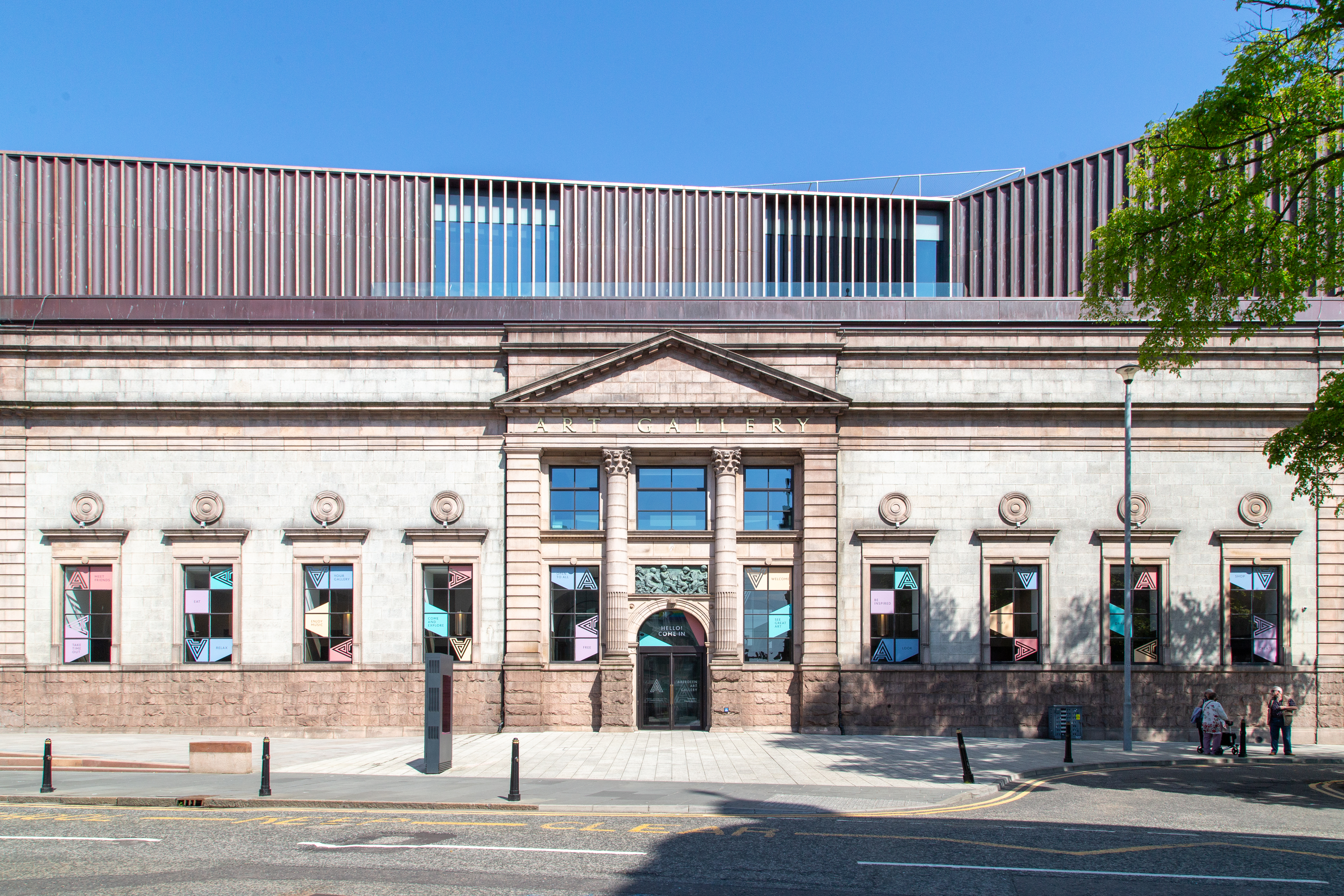
- Aberdeen Art Gallery entrance

General information
- Location: Aberdeen, Scotland
- Coordinates: 57.1482°N 2.1024°W
- Opened: 7 July 1885

Website
- www.aberdeencity.gov.uk/AAGM

Listed Building – Category A
- Official name: Schoolhill And Blackfriars Street, Art Gallery Including War Memorial And Cowdray Hall, Robert Gordon's College Archway And Former Gray's School Of Art
- Designated: 12 January 1967
- Reference no.: LB19978

Aberdeen Art Gallery is the main visual arts exhibition space in the city of Aberdeen, Scotland. It was founded in 1884 in a building designed by Alexander Marshall Mackenzie, with a sculpture court added in 1905. In 1900, it received the art collection of Alexander Macdonald, a local granite merchant. The gallery is noted for its fine collection of modern Scottish and international art, including works by Ken Currie, Gilbert & George, Ivor Abrahams, Bridget Riley and Bruce McLean.

== History ==
Following a competition, the winning design by Alexander Marshall Mackenzie and James Matthews began construction in 1883 and was opened in 7 July 1885. There were further additions, again by Mackenzie, in 1901 and 1905, including the addition of a sculpture court.

In April 2020, the gallery made 50 artworks available digitally via the Smartify app.

In October 2020, Aberdeen Art Gallery was named one of the five winners of the 2020 ArtFund Museum of the Year Award. ArtFund increased the prize money to £200,000 and changed the format of the award to five winners in response to the challenges faced by the museum sector during the COVID-19 pandemic.

== Collection ==
The Fine Arts collection of the Aberdeen Art Gallery has grown steadily since its foundation in 1885, highlighted with works by such artists as Monet and Renoir as well as more modern artists like John Bulloch Souter, Ian Hamilton Finlay, and James McBey.

The permanent collection includes 18th-century works by Henry Raeburn, William Hogarth, Allan Ramsay and Joshua Reynolds, and 20th-century works by Paul Nash and Francis Bacon, the Post-Impressionists and the Scottish Colourists, as well as applied arts and crafts.

David Wilkie (1786-1841) - The Duke of Wellington Writing Dispatches

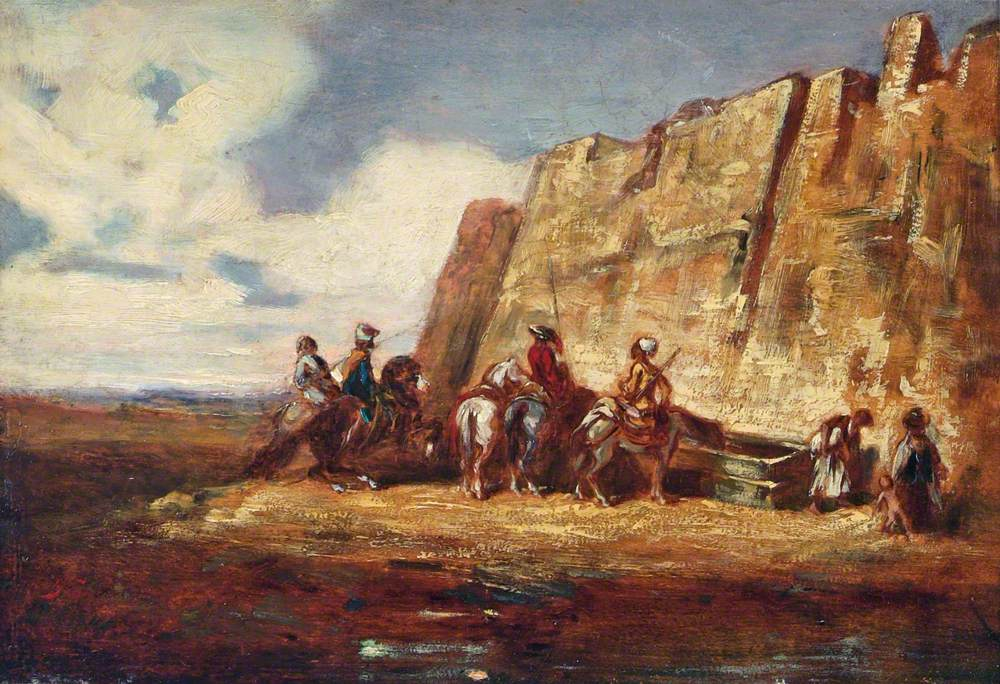
Alexandre-Gabriel Decamps (1803-1860) - The Watering Place

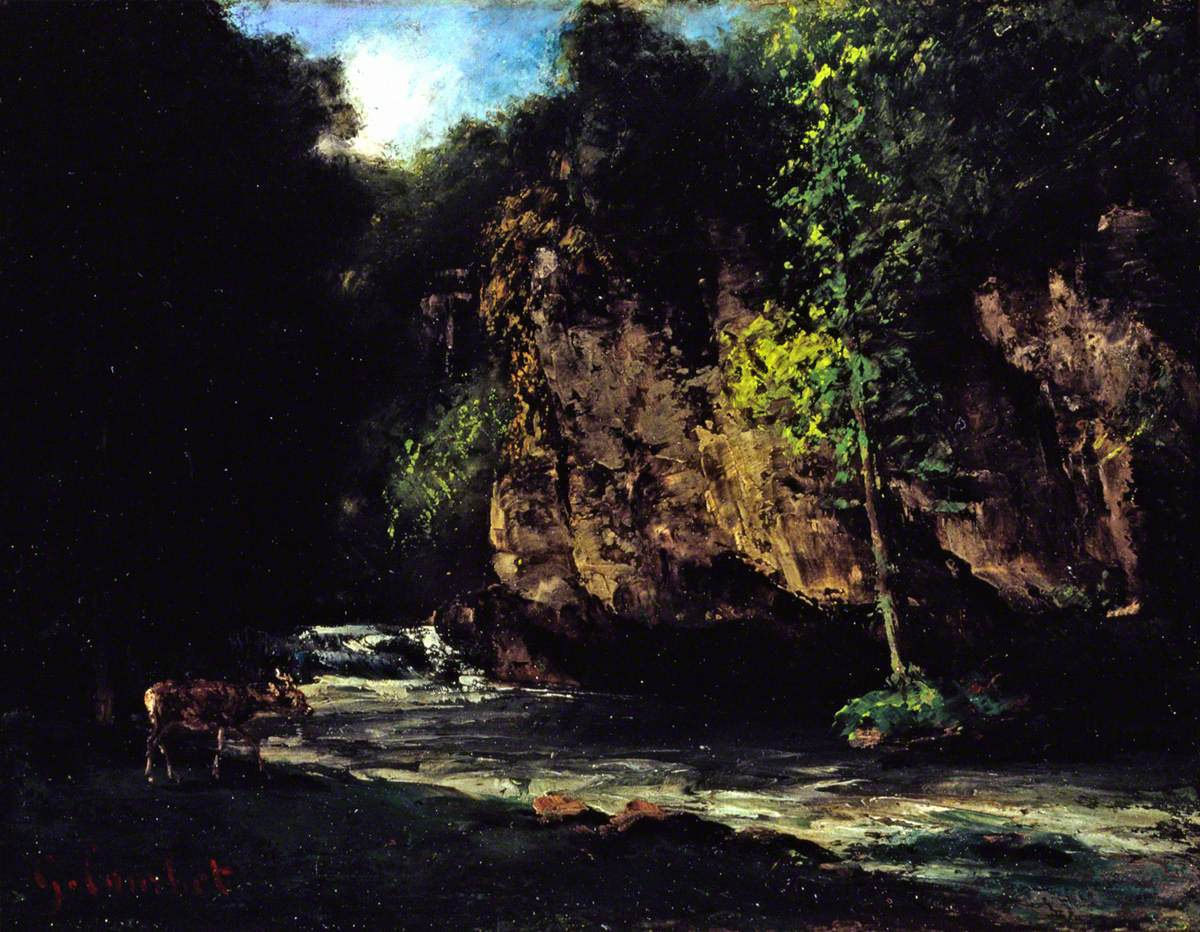
Gustave Courbet (1819-1877) - The Stream

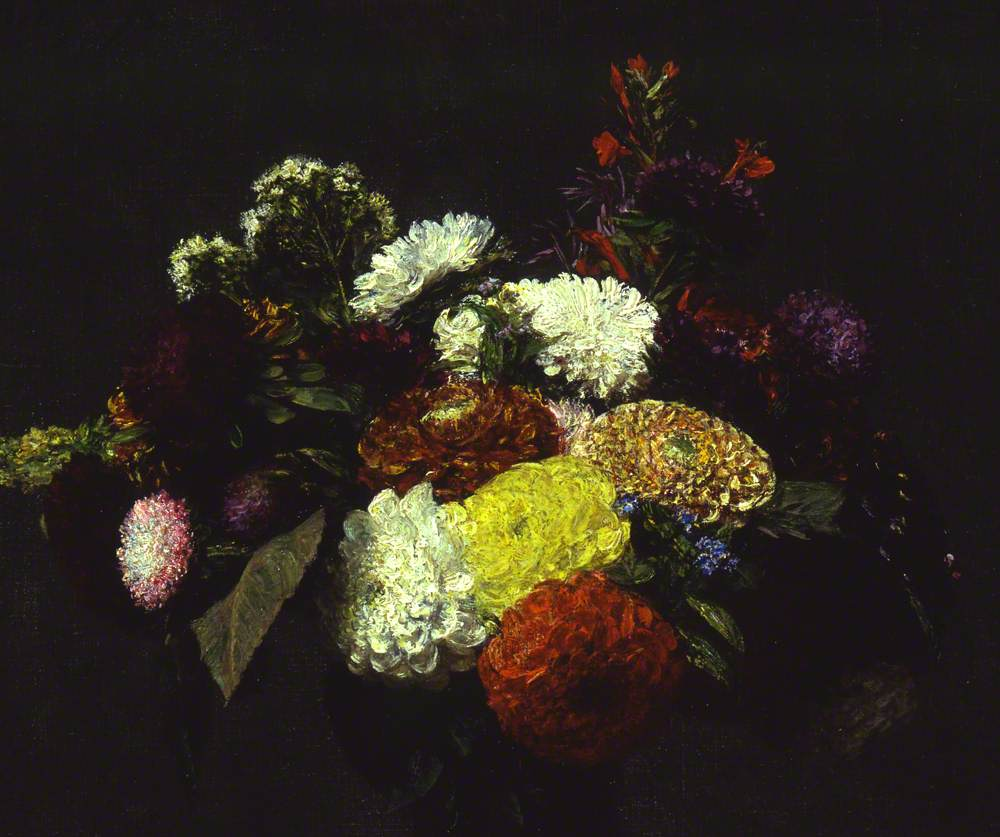
Henri Fantin-Latour (1836-1904) - Dahlias

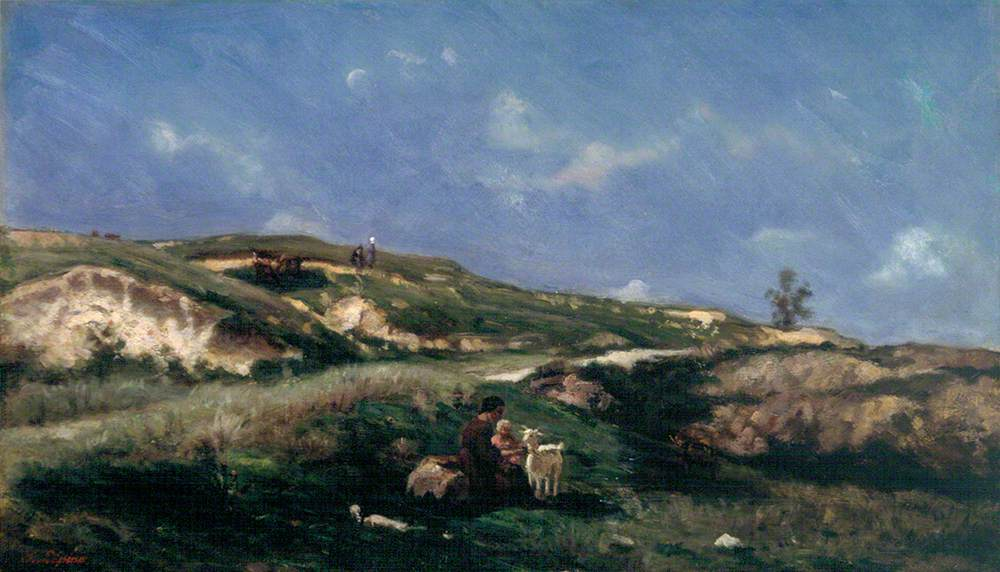
Stanislas Lépine (1835-1892) - The Shepherdess

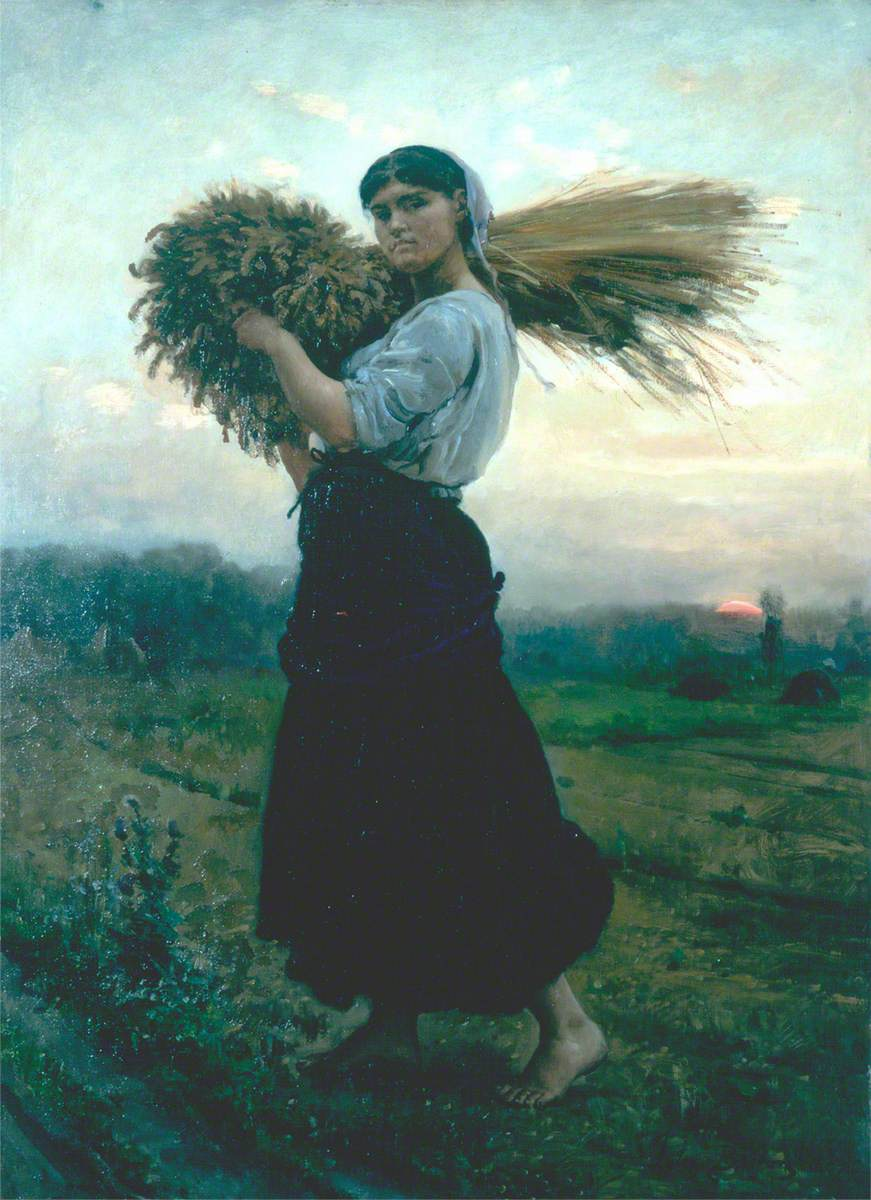
Jules Adolphe Aimé Louis Breton (1827-1906) - The Gleaner

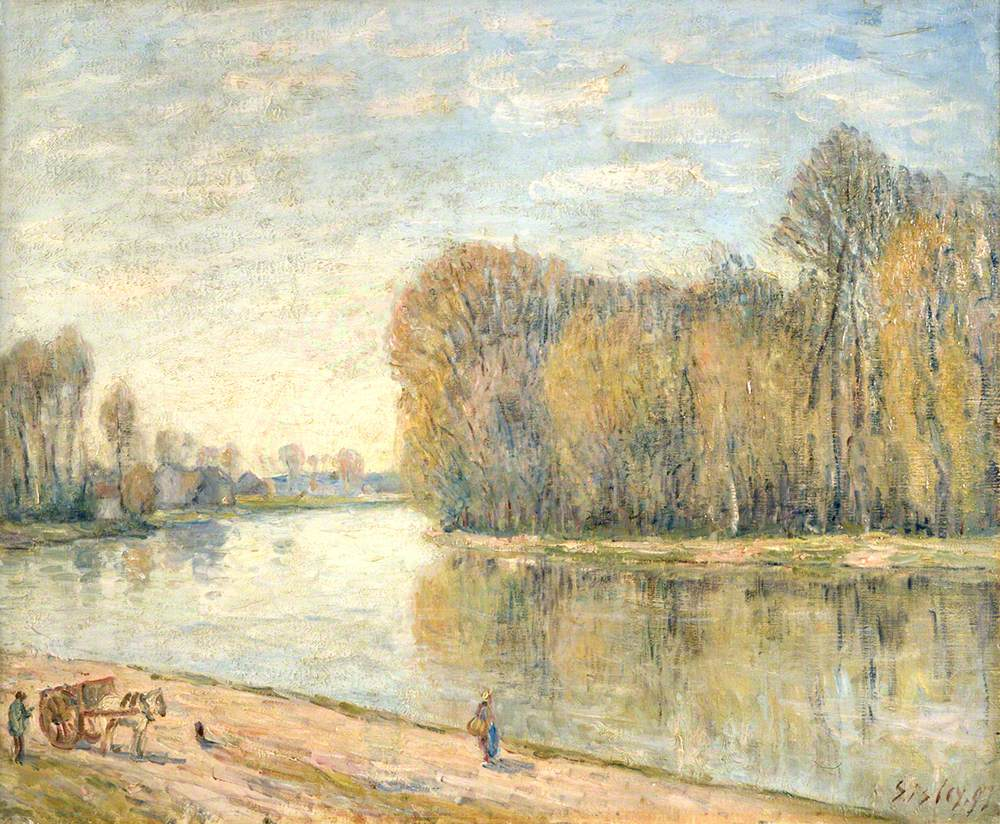
Alfred Sisley (1839-1899) - Les bords du Loing, France

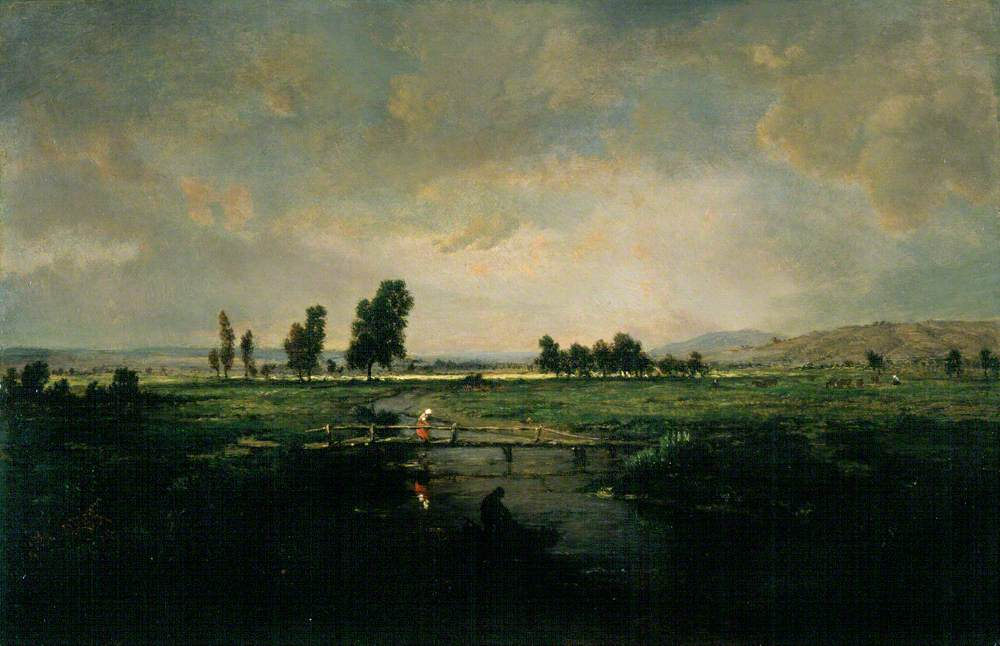
Théodore Rousseau (1812-1867) - Un marais dans les Landes, France

== Building and renovations ==
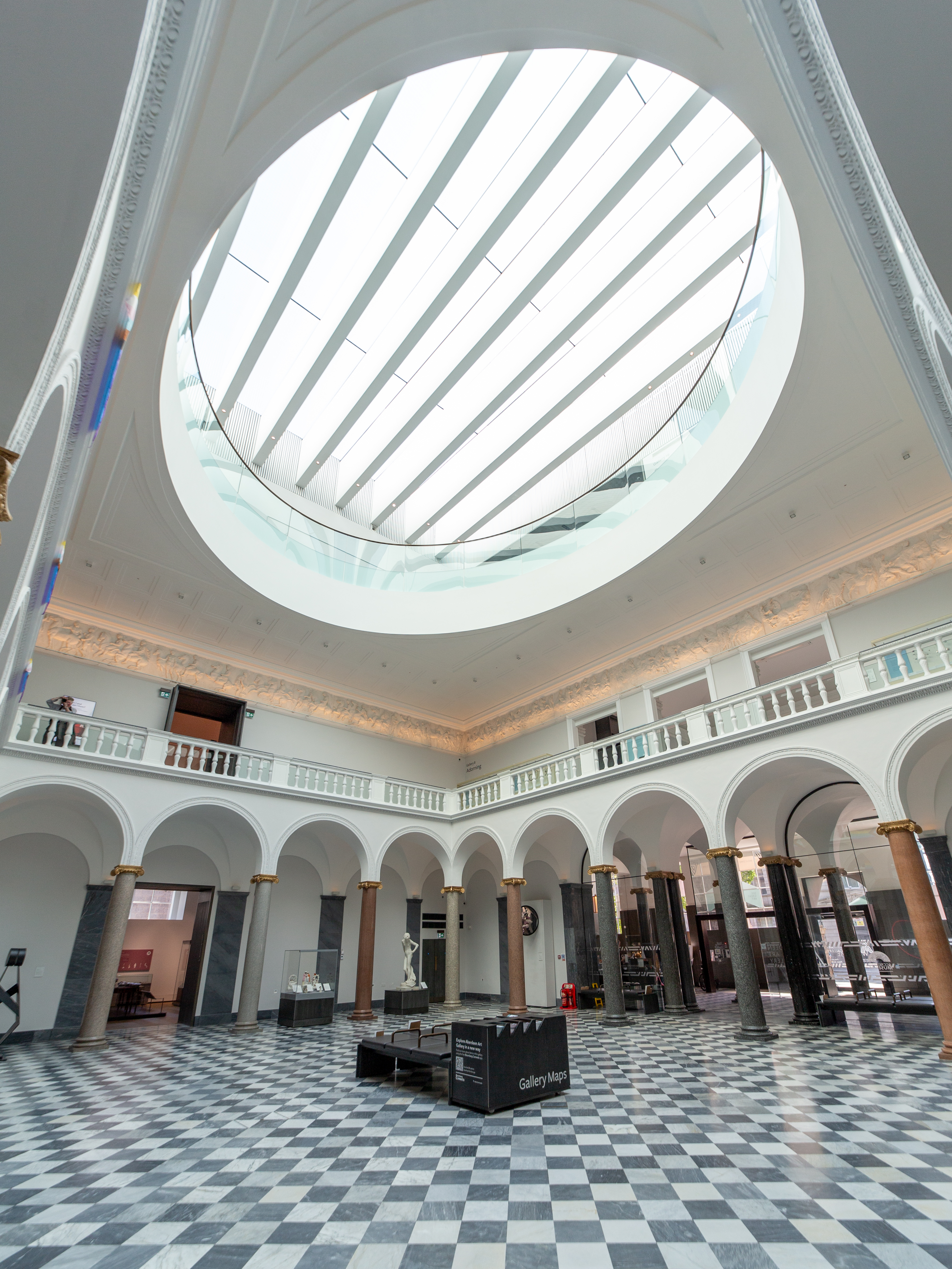
The Sculpture Court after renovation

The central hall is supported by granite columns in a variety of colours, derived from different quarries in the local area and far beyond.

At the western end of the building, with a room inside and a monument outside, is a major war memorial. The war memorial was built in the 1920s as a part of the rapid expansion of the Aberdeen Art Gallery and was funded by a public subscription. The Memorial Court court has a display of several books of remembrance and rolls of honour, commemorating the fallen of World War I, World War II, the Merchant Navy and Fishing Fleets in World War II, and from conflicts after 1945.

Another addition to the Gallery during this time of rapid expansion was Cowdray Hall. Cowdray Hall is a concert venue for music and performances and was opened by King George V and Queen Mary on 25 September 1925. The hall was supported by a gift from Annie Pearson, Viscountess Cowdray, "with a view to encouraging the taste for art and music in the City of Aberdeen."

The Gallery was closed for a programme of renovations commencing in 2015. The £34.6 million redevelopment was designed by Hoskins Architects and carried out by the contractors McLaughlin & Harvey. The gallery re-opened in November 2019. The project won an award from the Scottish Civic Trust for making an outstanding contribution to the quality and appearance of the built environment, as well as the trust's National Panel Special Award.

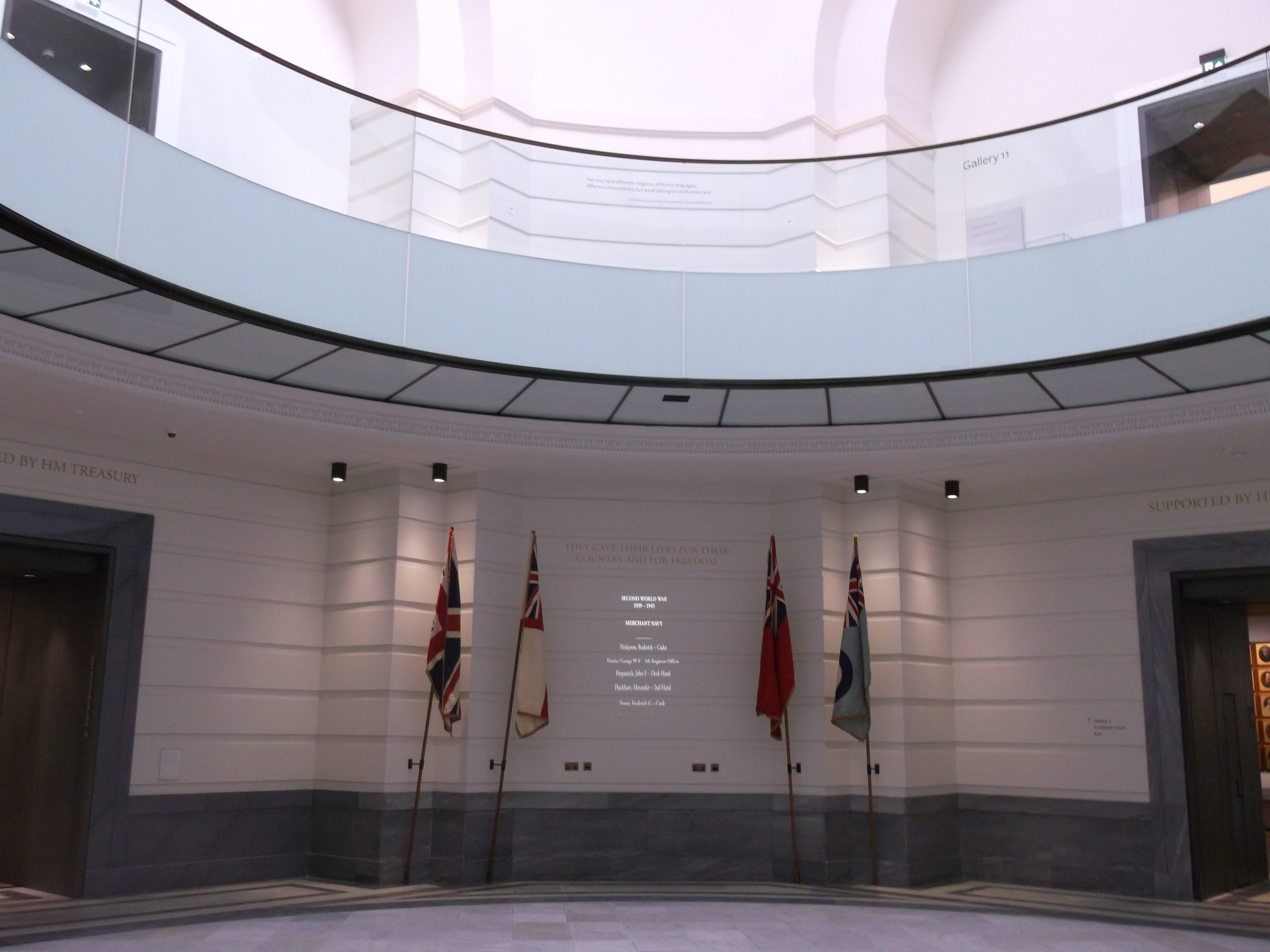
War Memorial (interior)

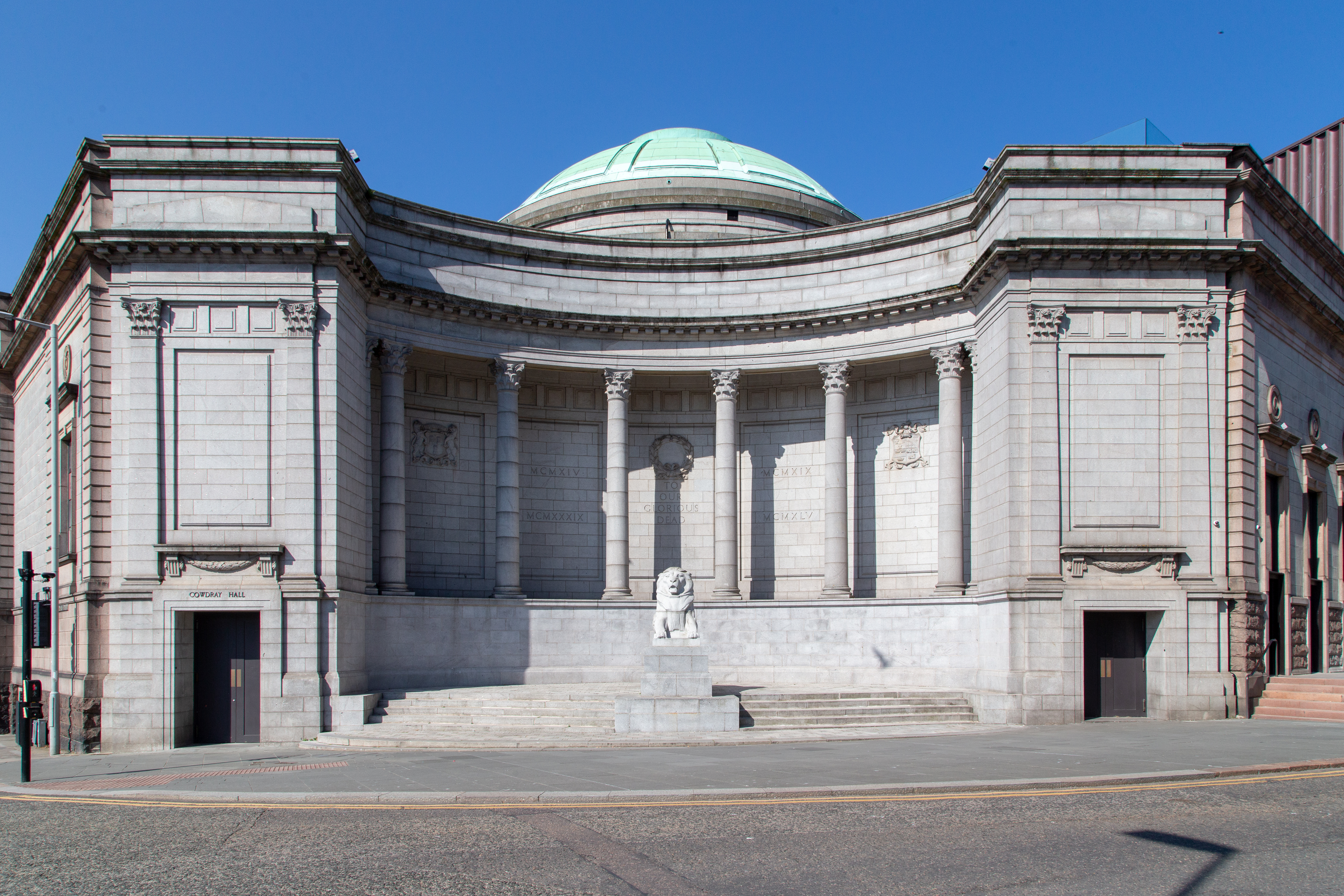
War Memorial (exterior)

== See also ==
- Culture in Aberdeen
