= NuArt Festival =

Street art festival in Stavanger, Norway

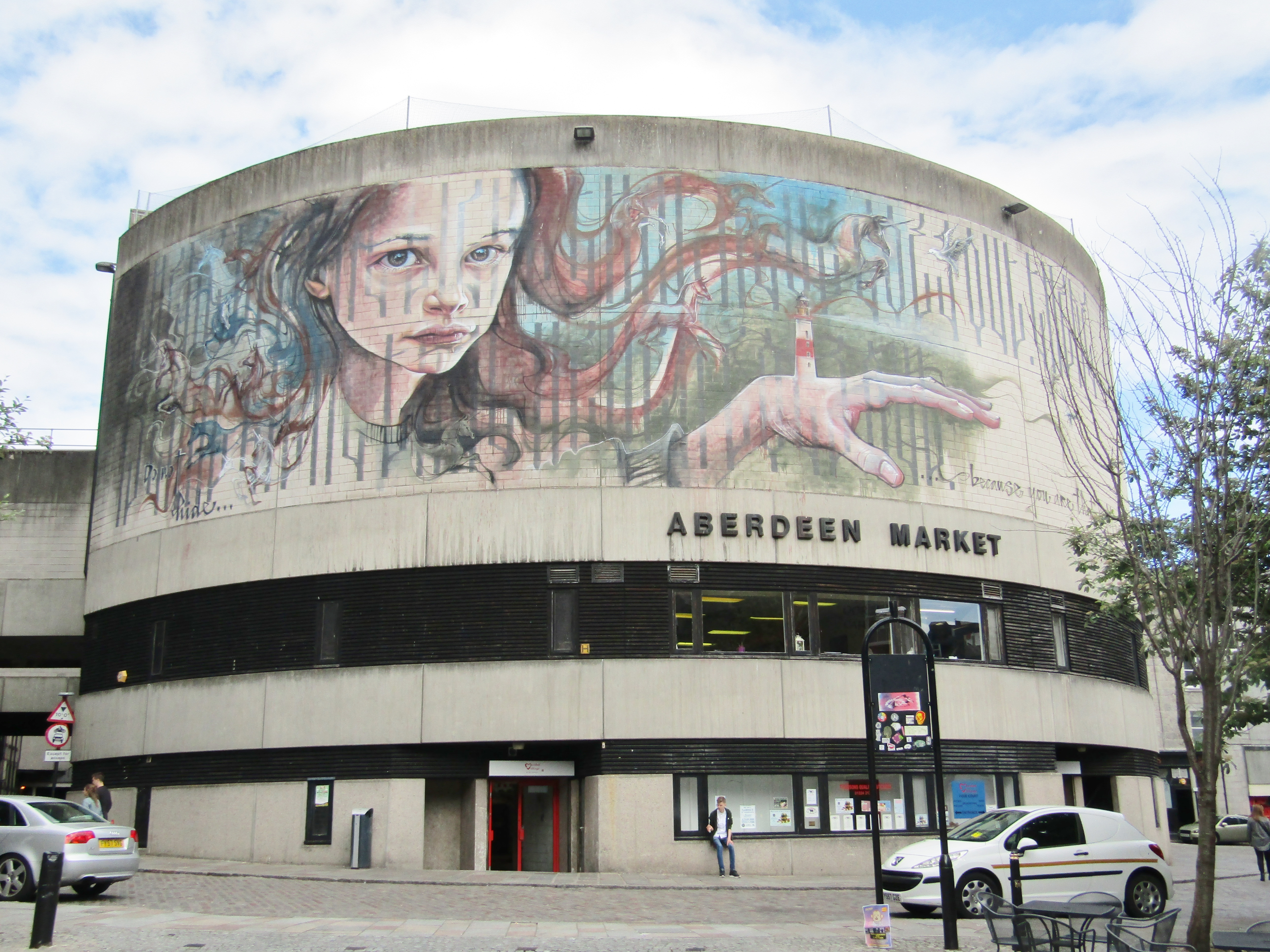
Artwork on the side of the Aberdeen Market

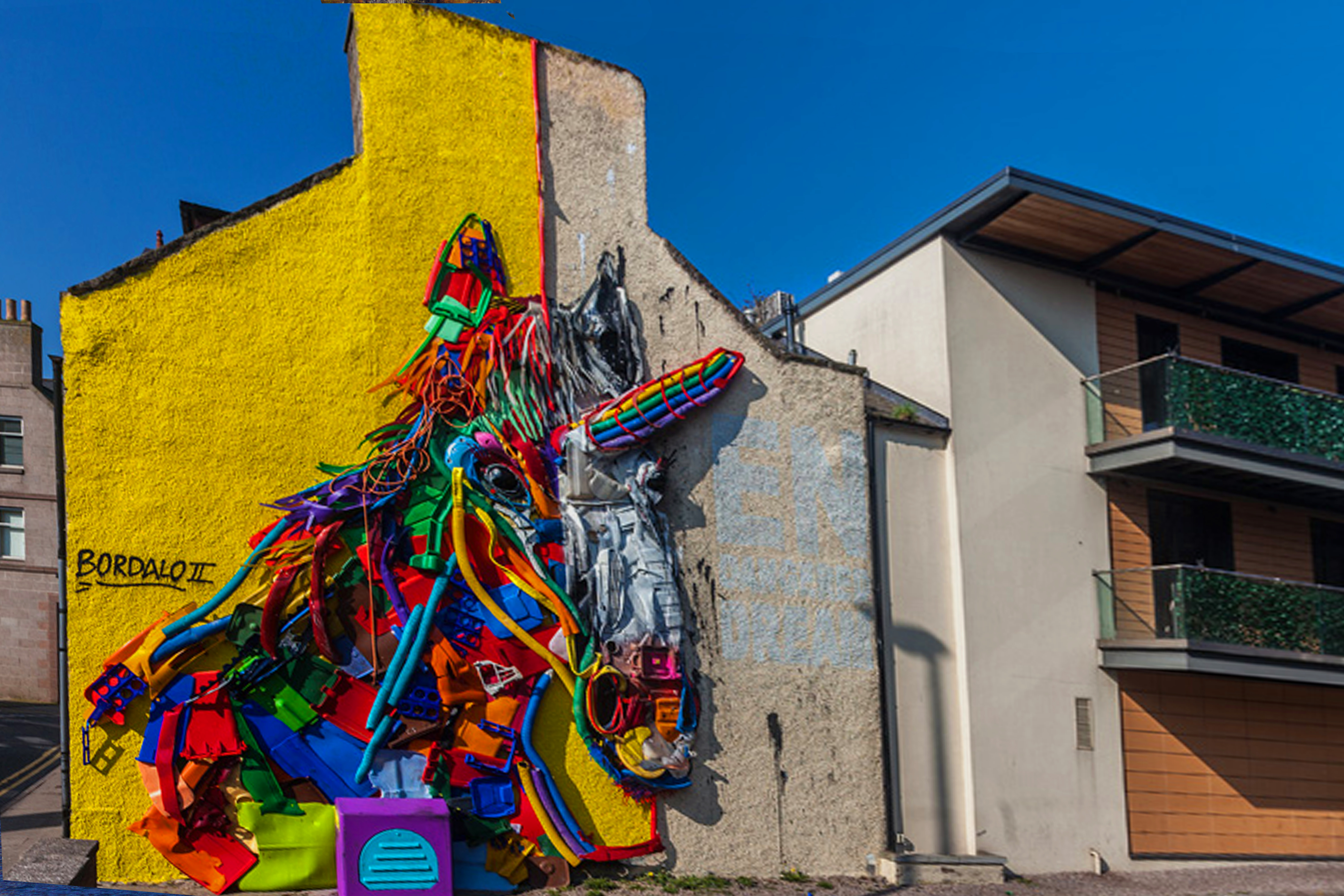
Unicorn by Portuguese street artist Artur Bordalo (BordaloII) at NuArt Festival Aberdeen (2018)

The NuArt Festival is an annual Street Art festival traditionally held in September in Stavanger (Norway) since 2001. Many associated artworks can be found in Stavanger, at Utsira, and in Oslo. Since 2017, there is also a NuArt Festival in Aberdeen, Scotland.

The not for profit event is purely dedicated to street art, in all its forms. It is one of the oldest official "street art" festivals in the world and invites many national- and international artists. The pieces are permanent (and legal) installations in the city landscape.

Nuart consists of a series of citywide exhibitions, events, performances, interventions, debates & workshops surrounding current trends and movements in street art.

Nuart Plus is an associated industry and academic symposium dedicated to street art.

Nuart RAD is an associated, local government initiated street-art project in Oslo.

== Exhibits ==
In Aberdeen, a large mural was painted on the exterior of the Aberdeen Market in 2017.

The festival was due to take place in Aberdeen in May 2020, but was cancelled due to the COVID-19 pandemic. It returned in 2021, but some elements couldn't take place, such as guided group tours. Artwork included "the largest paste-up wall in the world". In 2022, the festival returned in a full capacity, along with free walking tours.
