= Smartify =

Mobile app

- Initial release: 2017
- Platform: iOS; Android; Web app
- Website: smartify.org

Smartify is an application that identifies artworks from images and returns information about them.

== History ==
Smartify was founded by four friends in 2015. The app was launched at the Royal Academy of Arts in October 2017.

During the COVID-19 pandemic, the app made content available allowing users to browse items in museums digitally.

== Operation ==
The app is available on iOS, Android, and as a web app. Smartify describes itself as "a Shazam for the art world". When an artwork is scanned, Smartify compares it to the artwork in its database. If the artwork is recognised, its name and a description are returned to the user.

The app has been identified as an accessibility aid for visually impaired people who may struggle to see an artwork or text surrounding it, as one can zoom in on a picture of an artwork and read or listen to a description of it.

Jonathan Jones, writing for The Guardian, called the idea that in order to appreciate a work of art one needs to be "spoonfed amazing facts about it ", "erroneous and slightly pathetic".
