= List of Category A listed buildings in Aberdeen =

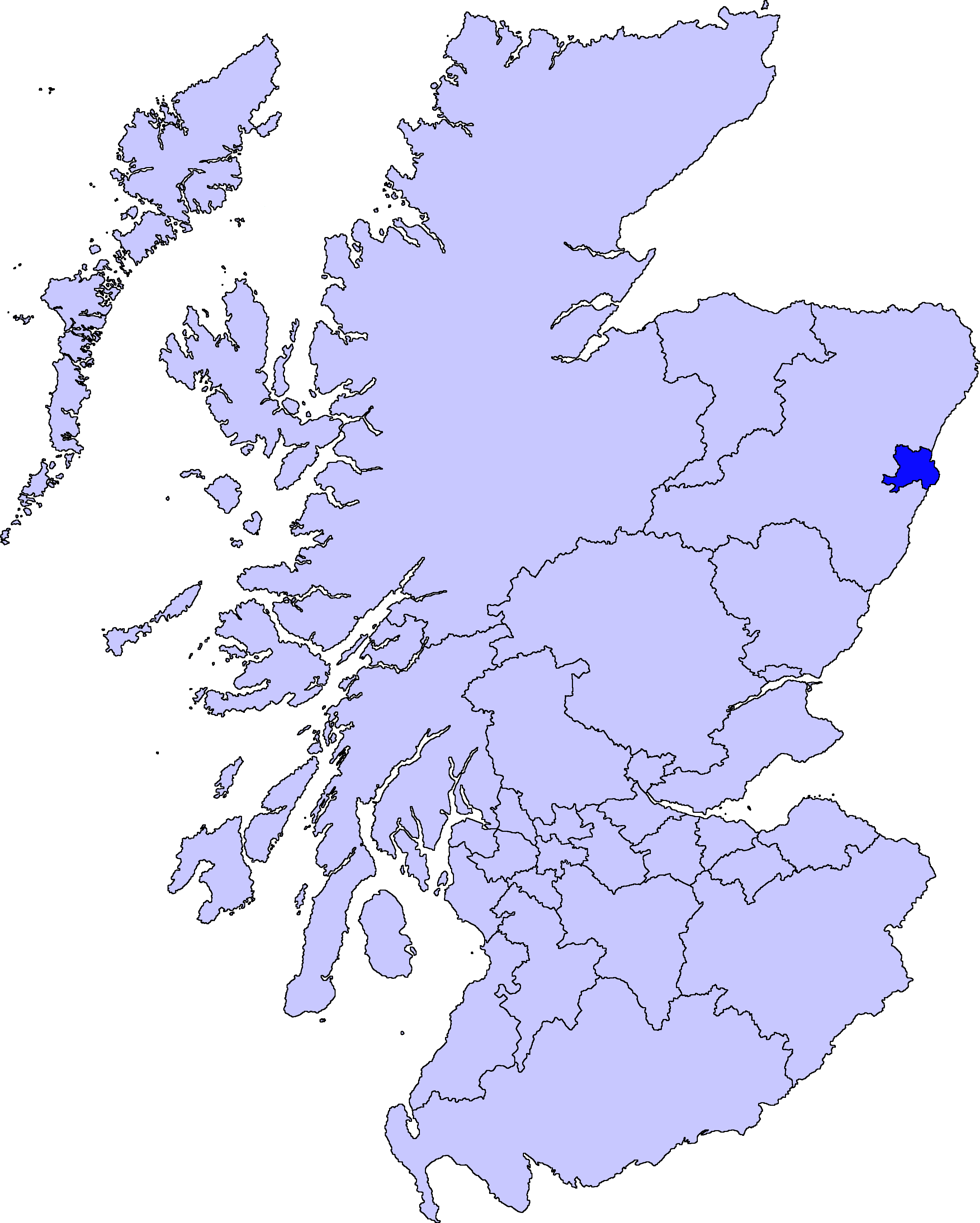
Aberdeen shown within Scotland

This is a list of Category A listed buildings in Aberdeen, Scotland.

In Scotland, the term listed building refers to a building or other structure officially designated as being of "special architectural or historic interest". Category A structures are those considered to be "buildings of national or international importance, either architectural or historic, or fine little-altered examples of some particular period, style or building type". Listing was begun by a provision in the Town and Country Planning (Scotland) Act 1947, and the current legislative basis for listing is the Planning (Listed Buildings and Conservation Areas) (Scotland) Act 1997. The authority for listing rests with Historic Environment Scotland, an executive agency of the Scottish Government. Once listed, severe restrictions are imposed on the modifications allowed to a building's structure or its fittings. Listed building consent must be obtained from local authorities prior to any alteration to such a structure. There are approximately 47,000 listed buildings in Scotland, of which around 3,500 are Category A.

The council area of Aberdeen City covers 184.5 square kilometres (71.2 sq mi), and has a population of around 210,400. There are 69 Category A listed buildings in the area. Much of the architecture of Aberdeen is built in the distinctive local granite, leading to the nickname, "The Granite City". During the first half of the 19th century, the most prominent architect in Aberdeen was Archibald Simpson (1790–1847), who completed many of the major public buildings in the city. Older buildings include the medieval Brig o' Balgownie and King's College Chapel, and the oldest town houses in the city: Provost Skene's house (1545), and Provost Ross' house (1593). More recently, Sir Robert Matthew's Crombie Halls of Residence at the University, completed in 1960, were listed at Category A in 2004, and five 1960s multi-storey residential tower blocks (Gilcomstoun Land, Porthill Court, Seamount Court, Virginia Court and Marischal Court, with three others removed on appeal) were listed in 2021. Other A-listed structures include a rare surviving locomotive turntable, an early suspension bridge by Samuel Brown, the intact Victorian Tivoli Theatre, and Scotland's oldest iron-framed mill building.

== Listed buildings ==
Name	Location	Date listed	Geo-coordinates	Notes	LB number	Image
Lidell's Monument	Dyce	16 April 1971	57°13′38″N 2°13′05″W	17th-century monument to Duncan Lidell (1561–1613)	2230	Upload another image See more images
Culter House (St. Margaret's School for Girls Boarding House)	Peterculter	16 April 1971	57°06′10″N 2°15′28″W	17th-century country house	15714	Upload another image See more images
Grandholm Works, Old Spinning Mill, Wing Mill, Engine and Turbine Houses	Grandholm Drive	25 November 1991	57°10′38″N 2°07′28″W	18th and 19th-century textile mill, the largest vertically integrated tweed mill in Scotland	18985	Upload another image See more images
Former St Nicholas Congregational Church	Belmont Street	12 January 1967	57°08′49″N 2°06′06″W	1865 Romanesque chapel	19937	Upload another image See more images
Former Triple Kirks (East and Belmont Church and Albion and St Paul's Church)	69-71 Schoolhill	12 January 1967	57°08′51″N 2°06′10″W	Remains of three conjoined Gothic churches, 1844 by Archibald Simpson	19940	Upload another image See more images
Greyfriars Church	Broad Street	12 January 1967	57°08′55″N 2°05′46″W	Gothic church of 1903 by Alexander Marshall Mackenzie	19941	Upload another image See more images
Kings College Chapel	College Bounds, Old Aberdeen	12 January 1967	57°09′51″N 2°06′06″W	Chapel, begun 1500	19943	Upload another image See more images
Aberdeen Arts Centre	33 King Street	12 January 1967	57°08′58″N 2°05′39″W	Greek-revival style former church of 1830 by John Smith	19946	Upload another image See more images
Queen's Cross Church	Carden Place	12 January 1967	57°08′36″N 2°07′30″W	Idiosyncratic Victorian Gothic church of 1881 by John Bridgeford Pirie of Pirie and Clyne	19948	Upload another image See more images
St. Andrew's Cathedral (Episcopal)	King Street	12 January 1967	57°08′57″N 2°05′35″W	Gothic cathedral of 1817 by Archibald Simpson	19953	Upload another image See more images
St Machar's Cathedral	The Chanonry	12 January 1967	57°10′12″N 2°06′08″W	14th century with later additions and alterations	19957	Upload another image See more images
St Margaret of Scotland Chapel and Former Convent Wing	17 Spital	12 January 1967	57°09′27″N 2°06′00″W	Gothic complex by Ninian Comper, 1898	19961	Upload another image See more images
St Mary's Church (Episcopal)	Carden Place	12 January 1967	57°08′40″N 2°07′10″W	Victorian Gothic church of 1864	19964	Upload another image See more images
St. Nicholas' Church	Union Street	12 January 1967	57°08′51″N 2°05′59″W	Medieval church, extensively rebuilt by James Gibbs in 1755 and Archibald Simpson in 1837	19966	Upload another image See more images
St. Nicholas' Church Churchyard	Union Street, 9 Back Wynd, Schoolhill and Correction Wynd	12 January 1967	57°08′47″N 2°05′58″W	Graveyard dating from the 16th century, with monuments from the 17th century onward	19967	Upload another image See more images
Advocates' Hall	Concert Court	19 March 1984	57°08′54″N 2°05′42″W	Classical hall by James Matthews, 1869	19977	Upload another image See more images
Aberdeen Art Gallery, War Memorial and Cowdray Hall, (Robert Gordon's Institute Of Technology)	78 Schoolhill	12 January 1967	57°08′53″N 2°06′10″W	Renaissance-style gallery by Alexander Marshall Mackenzie 1885, war memorial added 1925	19978	Upload another image See more images
Custom House	35 Regent Quay	26 May 1977	57°08′47″N 2°05′28″W	18th-century Georgian townhouse	19982	Upload another image See more images
Medico-Chirurgical Hall and County Record Office	27, 29 and 31 King Street	26 May 1977	57°08′56″N 2°05′38″W	Three conjoined buildings comprising Medico-Chirurgical Hall by Archibald Simpson (1820), County Record Office by John Smith (1823), and house of 1840	19983	Upload another image See more images
Town House, including Municipal Offices, Court Houses and Tolbooth	Castle Street	12 January 1967	57°08′53″N 2°05′41″W	17th-century tolbooth, with 19th-century offices by Peddie & Kinnear	19990	Upload another image See more images
Music Hall	174-194 Union Street	28 February 1962	57°08′44″N 2°06′18″W	Greek-revival hall by Archibald Simpson, 1820	19991	Upload another image See more images
Old Aberdeen Town House	High Street, Old Aberdeen	12 January 1967	57°10′02″N 2°06′08″W	18th-century town hall	19992	Upload another image See more images
Woolmanhill Hospital	Woolmanhill	25 May 1977	57°08′57″N 2°06′20″W	Neoclassical hospital of 1840 by Archibald Simpson, later 19th-century additions	19995	Upload another image See more images
Mercat Cross	Castlegate	12 January 1967	57°08′54″N 2°05′33″W	17th-century mercat cross, since moved and repaired	19999	Upload another image See more images
Bishop Elphinstone Memorial	King's College Grounds, College Bounds, Old Aberdeen	12 January 1967	57°09′51″N 2°06′06″W	1926 memorial to William Elphinstone (1431–1514)	20005	Upload another image See more images
Fountain, Victoria Park	Westburn Road and Argyll Place, Rosemount	19 March 1984	57°09′07″N 2°07′20″W	Granite fountain with Greek Revival details (1878) by John Bridgeford Pirie of Pirie and Clyne	20065	Upload another image See more images
Brig o' Balgownie	Bridge of Don	12 January 1967	57°10′38″N 2°05′55″W	14th-century bridge, attributed to Richard Cementarius	20067	Upload another image See more images
Bridge of Dee	Stonehaven Road and Anderson Drive South, Ruthrieston	12 January 1967	57°07′22″N 2°07′08″W	Early 16th-century bridge over the River Dee	20068	Upload another image See more images
Wellington Suspension Bridge	Over River Dee, at Craiglug	12 January 1967	57°08′08″N 2°05′44″W	Important example of an early suspension bridge, 1829 by Samuel Brown and John Smith	20073	Upload another image See more images
Girdleness Lighthouse	Greyhope Road	12 January 1967	57°08′20″N 2°02′55″W	1833 lighthouse by Robert Stevenson, and late 19th-century fog signal	20078	Upload another image See more images
Former Old Town's School	Little Belmont Street	12 January 1967	57°08′50″N 2°06′04″W	Greek revival school of 1841 by John Smith	20082	Upload another image See more images
Robert Gordon's College	Schoolhill	1 June 1966	57°08′57″N 2°06′10″W	1732 school by William Adam	20088	Upload another image See more images
Marischal College	Broad Street	12 January 1967	57°08′59″N 2°05′49″W	Tudor-Gothic granite college by Archibald Simpson, 1844, Aberdeen's largest granite building	20096	Upload another image See more images
Devanha House	12, 14 Devanha Gardens, Ferryhill	12 January 1967	57°08′10″N 2°06′08″W	Early 19th-century Regency house, extended by Archibald Simpson in 1840	20098	Upload another image
Westburn House	Westburn Park, Westburn Road and Cornhill Road	12 January 1967	57°09′16″N 2°07′22″W	Brick house by Archibald Simpson, 1839	20108	Upload another image See more images
Provost Skene's House	Broad Street	12 January 1967	57°08′54″N 2°05′51″W	Largely 17th-century house of George Skene, Provost of Aberdeen	20156	Upload another image See more images
Former Clydesdale Bank	5 Castle Street	12 January 1967	57°08′53″N 2°05′38″W	Built as North of Scotland Bank in 1842, by Archibald Simpson	20162	Upload another image See more images
Sheriff Court Annex and High Court of Justiciary (formerly Bank of Scotland)	53 Castle Street	12 January 1967	57°08′51″N 2°05′37″W	Classical-style former bank, built 1801, the first fully dressed granite ashlar building to be built in Aberdeen	20174	Upload another image See more images
Mitchell Hospital	9 The Chanonry, Old Aberdeen	12 January 1967	57°10′08″N 2°06′13″W	Courtyard of alms houses, 1801	20186	Upload another image See more images
Bede House	20, 22 Don Street, Old Aberdeen	12 Jan 1967	57°10′03″N 2°06′06″W	17th-century town house	20288	Upload another image See more images
The Chapter House (Cruickshanks Lodgings)	245, 247 Don Street, Balgownie	12 January 1967	57°10′39″N 2°06′02″W	17th-century town house	20299	Upload another image See more images
The Northern Hotel	1 Great Northern Road	23 April 1987	57°09′44″N 2°07′00″W	Art Deco hotel of 1938, by A.G.R. Mackenzie	20331	Upload another image See more images
Tivoli Theatre	34 - 48 Guild Street	12 January 1967	57°08′43″N 2°05′52″W	Rare example of a nearly intact Victorian theatre, Charles J. Phipps 1872, alterations by Frank Matcham 1909	20333	Upload another image See more images
62, 62A and 62B Hamilton Place	Whitehall Road	19 March 1984	57°08′52″N 2°07′36″W	Villa by Pirie and Clyne, 1885	20334	Upload another image See more images
64, 64A, 66, 66A and 66B Hamilton Place	Hamilton Place	19 March 1984	57°08′52″N 2°07′36″W	Villa by Pirie and Clyne, 1885	20335	Upload another image See more images
68, 68A and 70 Hamilton Place	Hamilton Place	19 March 1984	57°08′52″N 2°07′38″W	Villa by Pirie and Clyne, 1886	20336	Upload another image See more images
72 Hamilton Place	Hamilton Place	19 March 1984	57°08′51″N 2°07′39″W	Villa by Pirie and Clyne, 1890, with Provost's lamp	20337	Upload another image See more images
74 and 76 Hamilton Place	Hamilton Place	19 March 1984	57°08′51″N 2°07′40″W	Villa by Pirie and Clyne, 1887	20338	Upload another image See more images
78 and 80 Hamilton Place	Hamilton Place	19 March 1984	57°08′51″N 2°07′40″W	Villa by Pirie and Clyne, c.1886	20339	Upload another image See more images
82, 82A and 84 Hamilton Place	Hamilton Place	19 March 1984	57°08′51″N 2°07′42″W	Villa by Pirie and Clyne, c.1886	20340	Upload another image See more images
86, 86A, 88 and 88A Hamilton Place	Hamilton Place	19 March 1984	57°08′51″N 2°07′43″W	Villa by Pirie and Clyne, 1885	20341	Upload another image See more images
90 and 92 Hamilton Place	Hamilton Place	19 March 1984	57°08′50″N 2°07′44″W	Villa by Pirie and Clyne, c.1886	20342	Upload another image See more images
94, 94A and 96 Hamilton Place	Hamilton Place	19 March 1984	57°08′50″N 2°07′45″W	Villa by Pirie and Clyne, c.1886	20343	Upload another image See more images
81 High Street	High Street, Old Aberdeen	12 January 1967	57°09′58″N 2°06′11″W	Late 18th-century town house	20360	Upload another image See more images
96 High Street	High Street, Old Aberdeen	12 January 1967	57°10′00″N 2°06′07″W	Early 17th-century town house	20374	Upload another image See more images
50, 50A and 50B Queen's Road	Queen's Road	12 January 1967	57°08′30″N 2°08′07″W	Gothic villa by Pirie and Clyne, 1887	20459	Upload another image See more images
1-13 Rosemount Square	Rosemount	23 April 1987	57°08′56″N 2°06′43″W	Local authority housing designed in the 1930s and completed 1948, the last granite tenement block to be built in Aberdeen	20471	Upload another image See more images
Formar House of Provost Ross	48 and 50 Shiprow	12 January 1967	57°08′48″N 2°05′41″W	Pair of late-16th-century town houses, once occupied by Provost John Ross, now houses part of the Aberdeen Maritime Museum	20484	Upload another image See more images
1, 2, 3 Union Terrace and 146 Union Street	Union Terrace and Union Street	12 January 1967	57°08′45″N 2°06′10″W	Renaissance-style office building by Alexander Marshall Mackenzie, 1885	20573	Upload another image See more images
His Majesty's Theatre	Rosemount Viaduct	8 November 1973	57°08′53″N 2°06′18″W	Free Renaissance style theatre by Frank Matcham, 1906	20605	Upload another image See more images
79 Hamilton Place	Hamilton Place	26 May 1977	57°08′50″N 2°07′40″W	Villa by Pirie and Clyne, 1894	20628	Upload another image See more images
98 Hamilton Place	Hamilton Place	26 May 1977	57°08′50″N 2°07′46″W	Villa by Pirie and Clyne, 1891	20629	Upload another image See more images
Aberdeen Station	Guild Street	2 March 1990	57°08′38″N 2°05′54″W	Railway station completed 1920, the last major station to be built in Scotland, and mid-19th-century road bridge	20673	Upload another image See more images
Locomotive Turntable, Ferryhill Motive Power Depot	Polmuir Avenue, Ferryhill	17 May 1996	57°07′52″N 2°05′59″W	Early 20th-century locomotive turntable, one of very few surviving in Scotland	43378	Upload another image See more images
Broadford Works	Maberly Street	12 January 1967	57°09′11″N 2°06′29″W	Early 19th-century mill, the oldest iron-framed mill in Scotland, and the fourth oldest known to survive in the world, with 19th and early 20th-century extensions	43908	Upload another image See more images
Crombie Halls of Residence	Meston Walk	11 November 2004	57°09′50″N 2°06′15″W	Modernist student residence by Sir Robert Matthew, completed 1960	50016	Upload another image See more images
1-75 Gilcomstoun Land	Kidd Street	18 January 2021	57°08′48″N 2°06′35″W	20th-century block of flats	52522	Upload another image
1-48 Virginia Court, 1-108 Marischal Court	Castlehill	18 January 2021	57°08′56″N 2°05′25″W	20th-century blocks of flats	52523	Upload another image See more images
1-72 Porthill Court, 1-126 Seamount Court, 152-158 (even numbers) Gallowgate	Gallowgate	18 January 2021	57°09′09″N 2°05′56″W	20th-century blocks of flats including shops and multistorey car park	52524	Upload another image See more images

== See also ==
- Scheduled monuments in Aberdeen
- List of listed buildings in Aberdeen
