= John Ross (provost) =

Coordinates: 57.1467°N 2.0947°W

Provost John Ross
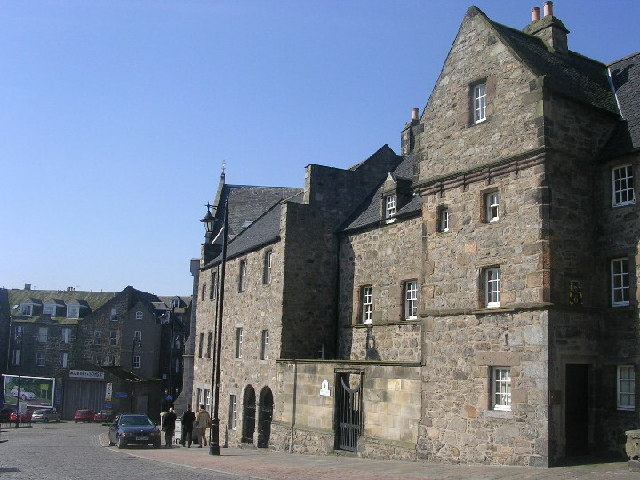
- Looking down Shiprow with Provost Ross's house on the right

Lord Provost in Aberdeen, Scotland
- In office 1710–1712

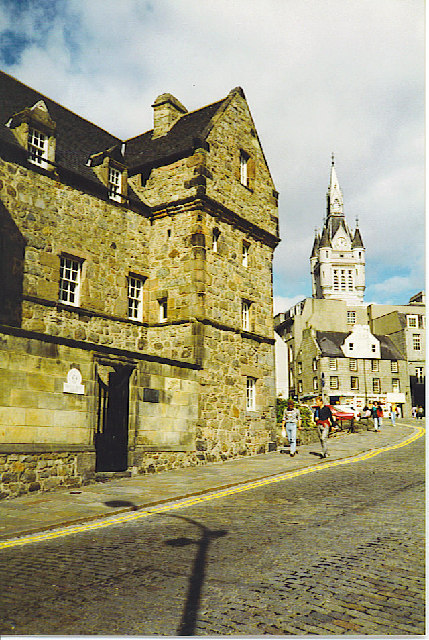
Provost Ross's House, with the clock tower of Aberdeen Sheriff Court on the right

Provost John Ross was Lord Provost in Aberdeen, Scotland from 1710 to 1712. He is most famous for the house he occupied in the 18th century from 1702.

== Provost Ross's House ==
Built in 1593, the house is the second oldest house in the city. Provost Skene's House is the oldest.

It is located on Shiprow and currently contains the Aberdeen Maritime Museum which has been at the site since 1984. It is owned by the National Trust for Scotland and was refurbished in the 1950s before opening again in 1954.

In 1702 Ross also purchased Arnage Castle near Ellon. Provost John Ross was involved in trading with Holland and he died in Amsterdam in 1714.

Civic offices
Preceded by John Allardes	Lord Provost of Aberdeen; 1710–1712	Succeeded by John Allardes
