= Scheduled monuments in Aberdeen =

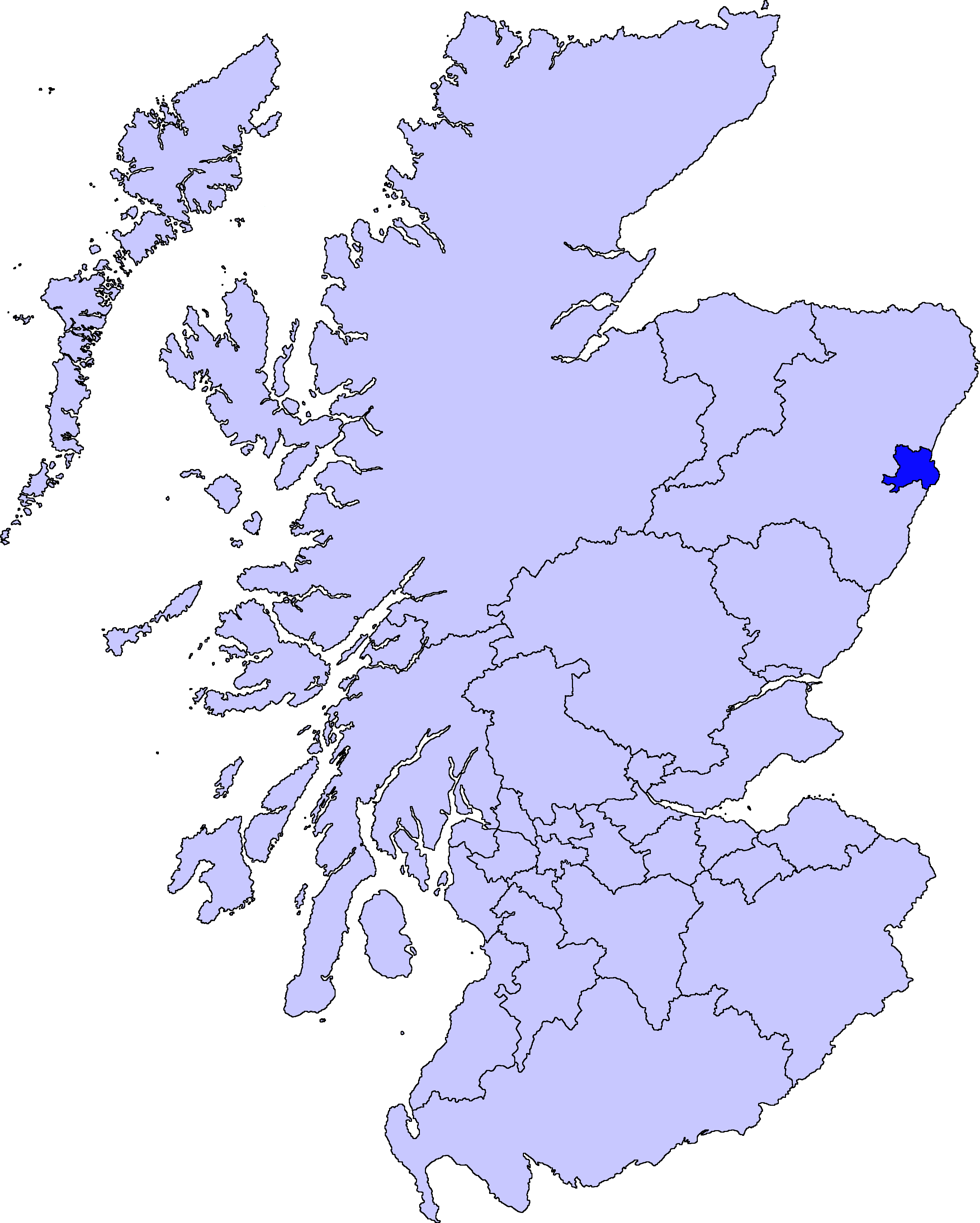
Aberdeen shown within Scotland

A scheduled monument in Scotland is a nationally important archaeological site or monument which is given legal protection by being placed on a list (or "schedule") maintained by Historic Environment Scotland. The aim of scheduling is to preserve the country's most significant sites and monuments as far as possible in the form in which they have been inherited.

The process of scheduling is governed by the Ancient Monuments and Archaeological Areas Act 1979, which aims "to make provision for the investigation, preservation and recording of matters of archaeological or historical interest". The term "scheduled monument" can apply to the whole range of archaeological sites which have been deliberately constructed by human activity but are not always visible above ground. They range from prehistoric standing stones and burial sites, through Roman remains and medieval structures such as castles and monasteries, to later structures such as industrial sites and buildings constructed for the World Wars. Some buildings or structures which were both scheduled and listed have had their listing designations removed to reduce the duplication.

As of 2017 there were 8,238 scheduled monuments in Scotland.

== Notable scheduled monuments in Aberdeen ==
Name	Location	Description	Ref No	Image
Aberdeenshire Canal	Aberdeen; Aberdeenshire	Canal	SM7674, SM7675, SM8421, SM7583, SM10424	
Bieldside Cairn	Bieldside	Cairn	SM3956	
Lang Stane of Hilton	Hilton	Standing Stone	SM4263	
Normandykes Roman camp	Peterculter	Site of Roman Camp	SM2478	
St Machar's Cathedral and graveyard	Old Aberdeen	High kirk	SM90001	
Tullos Cairn	Torry	Prehistoric cairn	SM4055	
Torry Battery	Torry	Artillery battery	SM9215	
Tyrebagger stone circle	Dyce	Stone circle	SM22	

== See also ==
- List of Category A listed buildings in Aberdeen
