= Lang Stane of Hilton =

Standing stone in Scotland

- Lang Stane
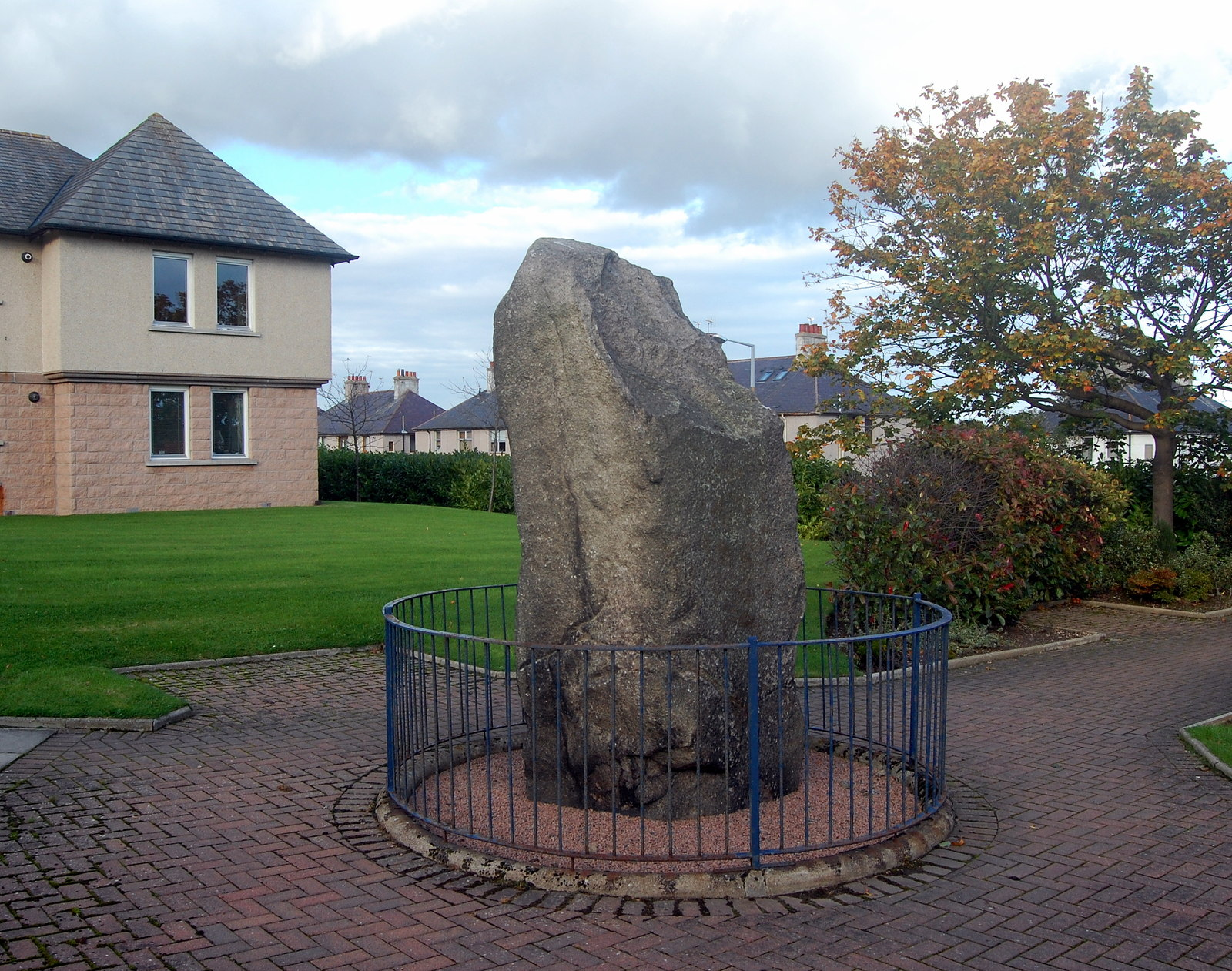
- Lang Stane in May 2016
- Interactive map of Lang Stane of Hilton
- 57.165952°N 2.1298959°W
- Type: Standing Stone
- Periods: Neolithic-Bronze Age
- Location: Aberdeen City, Scotland

History
- Built: c. 4000-800 BC

Site notes
- Material: Stone
- Height: 2.95 m (9 ft 8 in)
- Public access: Yes

Scheduled monument
- Official name: Lang Stane, Hilton
- Type: Prehistoric ritual and funerary: standing stone
- Designated: 30 April 1928
- Reference no.: SM4263

The Lang Stane in Hilton, Aberdeen, Scotland is a granite Menhir type standing stone with measurements of approximately 2.95 m in height, 1.5 m in breadth and 0.9 m in thickness at ground level. Its broad face is aligned WNW and ESE.

In the immediate area of Aberdeen there are other standing stones with the same name, such as the Lang Stane at Langstane Place in Aberdeen city centre and the Lang Stane of Auquhollie just south Aberdeen.

== See also ==
- Lang Stane, Aberdeen
- Ravenswood standing stone
- Scheduled monuments in Aberdeen
