= Lang Stane, Aberdeen =

Coordinates: 57.144614°N 2.104617°W

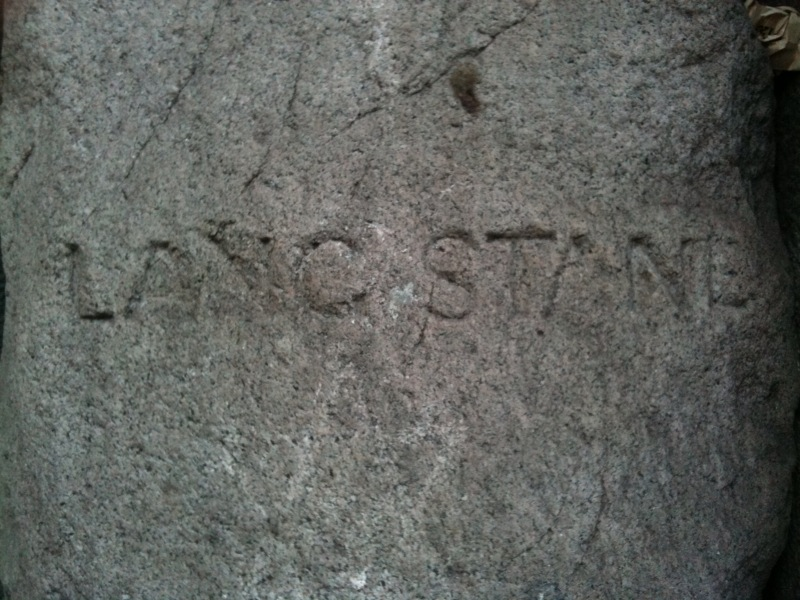
Close up of the inscription.

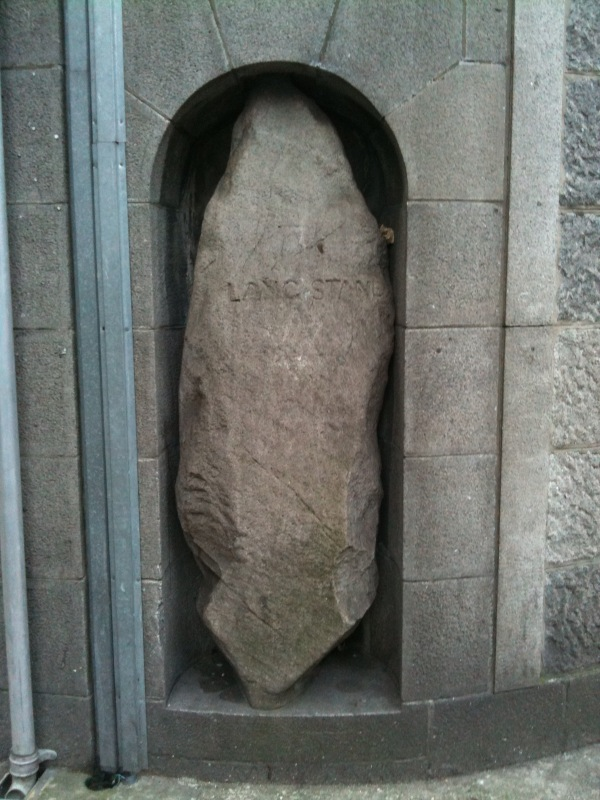
The Lang Stane in its alcove on 10 Langstane Place.

The Lang Stane in Aberdeen, Scotland is a granite Menhir type standing stone that sits recessed into an alcove at the south east corner of 10 Langstane Place, just off Aberdeen's main thoroughfare Union Street.

There is suggestion that the nearby Crabstane and the Lang Stane were both used as boundary stones of Craibstone Croft, site of the Battle of Craibstone in 1571. Whilst close to its location as a boundary marker its current site is unlikely to be the exact location of the Craibstone boundary as it would have been moved during the construction of Union Street and the surrounding infrastructure. Prior to this the stone was probably part of a stone circle, the conclusion taken as the base has been carved into a keel shape- common of recumbent stone circles found in Aberdeenshire, which usually date to approximately 3000BC.

The stone has dimensions of 1.8m height, 0.68m breadth and approximately 0.3m thickness.

On Paterson's Map of the Burgh of Aberdeen printed in 1746 prior to the construction of Langstane Place, the stone can be seen in approximately its current location, though it does not appear as part of a stone circle.

Throughout the city the name reoccurs with the single word differentiation 'Langstane' - indeed the area of the city where the Lang Stane sits is within the aptly named former Langstane political ward. The title occurs often in local business and areas with examples such as the former Langstane Kirk (now Soul), Langstane Press and Langstane Housing Association.

In the immediate area of Aberdeen there are other standing stones with same name, such as the Lang Stane of Hilton area of the city and the Lang Stane of Auquhollie just south Aberdeen.

== Book References ==
- Wyness, J F (1965). City by the grey North Sea: Aberdeen.
