= List of listed buildings in Aberdeen/6 =

This is a list of listed buildings in Aberdeen, Scotland.

== List ==
Name	Location	Date listed	Grid ref. (Note: Sometimes known as OSGB36, the grid reference (where provided) is based on the British national grid reference system used by the Ordnance Survey. • "Guide to National Grid". Ordnance Survey. • "Get-a-map". Ordnance Survey.)	Geo-coordinates	Notes	LB number (Note: Historic Environment Scotland assign a unique alphanumeric identifier to each designated site in Scotland, for listed buildings this always begins with "LB", for example "LB12345".)	Image
13 Hadden Street And 1 Stirling Street				57°08′46″N 2°05′52″W	Category C(S)	20664	Upload Photo
Castle Street, The Mannie Or Green Fountain				57°08′52″N 2°05′39″W	Category B	20669	Upload Photo
11 And 12 Correction Wynd				57°08′50″N 2°05′56″W	Category B	20679	Upload Photo
Polmuir Avenue, Ferryhill Motive Power Depot, Former Engine Shed				57°07′56″N 2°05′55″W	Category B	20617	Upload Photo
79 Hamilton Place At Blenheim Place, Including Gates, Gatepiers And Boundary Walls				57°08′50″N 2°07′40″W	Category A	20628	Upload another image
87 Fountainhall Road At Hamilton Place, Including Boundary Walls				57°08′49″N 2°07′49″W	Category B	20631	Upload Photo
87 Waterloo Quay And 1 Wellington Street				57°08′43″N 2°04′52″W	Category B	20594	Upload Photo
Wrights' And Coopers' Place, (Houses 1 And 2; Old Numbers 1, 3 And 82 High Street) Old Aberdeen				57°09′59″N 2°06′07″W	Category B	20600	Upload Photo
Union Street, 199, 201				57°08′42″N 2°06′13″W	Category B	20531	Upload Photo
Union Street, 401-415 (Odd Numbers)				57°08′36″N 2°06′34″W	Category C(S)	20544	Upload Photo
114-122 (Even Nos) Union Street And 1 Back Wynd				57°08′48″N 2°06′00″W	Category B	20555	Upload Photo
Union Terrace, 15				57°08′47″N 2°06′14″W	Category C(S)	20575	Upload Photo
North Silver Street Migvie House				57°08′49″N 2°06′24″W	Category B	20489	Upload Photo
North Silver Street, 12				57°08′48″N 2°06′20″W	Category B	20493	Upload Photo
North Silver Street, 18				57°08′49″N 2°06′21″W	Category B	20495	Upload Photo
North Silver Street, 24				57°08′50″N 2°06′22″W	Category B	20499	Upload Photo
Skene Terrace, 40				57°08′51″N 2°06′26″W	Category B	20502	Upload Photo
Skene Terrace, 46, 46A				57°08′50″N 2°06′28″W	Category B	20505	Upload Photo
Thom's Place, 4 High Street Old Aberdeen				57°09′57″N 2°06′09″W	Category B	20511	Upload Photo
87 And 89 Union Street				57°08′48″N 2°05′53″W	Category C(S)	20523	Upload Photo
131 And A Half-139 (Odd Nos) Union Street				57°08′46″N 2°06′00″W	Category C(S)	20526	Upload Photo
143-153 (Odd Nos) Union Street				57°08′45″N 2°06′03″W	Category B	20527	Upload Photo
144 And 144A King Street				57°09′04″N 2°05′38″W	Category C(S)	20411	Upload Photo
10-14 (Even Nos) Marischal Street				57°08′51″N 2°05′36″W	Category B	20433	Upload Photo
1 Queen's Cross At Albyn Place And St Swithin Street, Including Gatepiers, Railings And Boundary Walls				57°08′34″N 2°07′34″W	Category B	20455	Upload Photo
33 Regent Quay And 59 Marischal Street (Formerly Town And County Bank)				57°08′48″N 2°05′30″W	Category B	20461	Upload Photo
43, 44 And 45 Regent Quay				57°08′48″N 2°05′25″W	Category C(S)	20464	Upload Photo
1 And 1A Rubislaw Den North, Including Ancillary Structure, Gatepiers And Boundary Walls				57°08′39″N 2°08′07″W	Category B	20473	Upload Photo
High Street, 103, 105 (West Side) Old Aberdeen				57°10′00″N 2°06′09″W	Category B	20364	Upload Photo
High Street, 100, 102 (East Side) Old Aberdeen				57°10′00″N 2°06′08″W	Category B	20375	Upload Photo
Don Street, 126 (East Side) And 679 King Street				57°10′13″N 2°05′48″W	Category B	20393	Upload Photo
Don Street, 76, Now Annexe To No. 78 (East Side) Old Aberdeen				57°10′08″N 2°05′57″W	Category B	20294	Upload Photo
Don Street (N.W. Side) 2 Rocky Bank				57°10′39″N 2°06′01″W	Category B	20301	Upload Photo
Don Street (N.W. Side) Brig End				57°10′40″N 2°05′58″W	Category B	20305	Upload Photo
Don Street (S.E. Side) Rose Cottage				57°10′38″N 2°06′02″W	Category B	20306	Upload Photo
Douglas Place, 4 Old Aberdeen				57°09′54″N 2°06′09″W	Category B	20308	Upload Photo
Dunbar Street, 5 And 84 High Street				57°09′59″N 2°06′05″W	Category C(S)	20310	Upload Photo
Dunbar Street, 5 (Garden Wall)				57°09′59″N 2°06′04″W	Category C(S)	20311	Upload Photo
Duncan's Place, 2, 4 High Street Old Aberdeen				57°09′52″N 2°06′08″W	Category B	20313	Upload Photo
College Bounds, 50, 52 Boundary Wall To No. 50				57°09′49″N 2°06′06″W	Category B	20237	Upload Photo
Crown Street, 23, 25 Prudential Building				57°08′40″N 2°06′11″W	Category B	20240	Upload Photo
Dee Place, 15, 17				57°08′30″N 2°06′11″W	Category C(S)	20256	Upload Photo
Dee Street, 43				57°08′36″N 2°06′11″W	Category B	20260	Upload Photo
Dee Street, 63, 65				57°08′33″N 2°06′11″W	Category C(S)	20262	Upload Photo
Dee Street, 73, 75				57°08′32″N 2°06′10″W	Category C(S)	20264	Upload Photo
Don Street, 20, 22 (East Side) Bede House, Old Aberdeen				57°10′03″N 2°06′06″W	Category A	20288	Upload another image
46-48 (Inclusive Nos) Castle Street				57°08′52″N 2°05′35″W	Category C(S)	20171	Upload Photo
53 Castle Street, Sheriff Court Annex And High Court Of Justiciary (Formerly Bank Of Scotland)				57°08′51″N 2°05′37″W	Category A	20174	Upload Photo
Chanonry, 3 Boundary Wall				57°10′04″N 2°06′08″W	Category B	20181	Upload Photo
Chanonry, 14 Old Aberdeen				57°10′09″N 2°06′07″W	Category B	20194	Upload Photo
Chanonry, 16 Old Aberdeen				57°10′09″N 2°06′05″W	Category B	20197	Upload Photo
College Bounds, 41 (West Side) Music Department Old Aberdeen				57°09′48″N 2°06′10″W	Category B	20217	Upload Photo
26 Albyn Place, Including Gatepiers And Boundary Walls				57°08′34″N 2°07′12″W	Category B	20120	Upload Photo
47 Belmont Street				57°08′50″N 2°06′07″W	Category B	20131	Upload Photo
Bon Accord Street 36				57°08′34″N 2°06′20″W	Category C(S)	20144	Upload Photo
Schoolhill, Robert Gordon's College Including North Gates And Boundary Walls				57°08′57″N 2°06′10″W	Category A	20088	Upload Photo
University Of Aberdeen King's College, Quadrangle, Library And Elphinstone Hall, College Bounds, Old Aberdeen				57°09′50″N 2°06′04″W	Category B	20092	Upload Photo
King's College, New Building, Gateway				57°09′53″N 2°06′07″W	Category B	20094	Upload Photo
King's College, Sports Pavilion, Off University Road				57°09′49″N 2°06′00″W	Category B	20095	Upload Photo
Willowbank Road, Willowbank House, Including Boundary Walls				57°08′23″N 2°06′34″W	Category B	20109	Upload Photo
Woodside House, Mugiemoss Road				57°10′40″N 2°08′52″W	Category B	20111	Upload Photo
Gordon, Duke Of, Golden Square				57°08′45″N 2°06′18″W	Category B	20007	Upload another image See more images
March Stone No. 54, At Junction Of Provost Rust Drive And Smithfield Drive				57°09′56″N 2°08′26″W	Category B	20034	Upload Photo
Wellington Suspension Bridge Over River Dee, At Craiglug				57°08′08″N 2°05′44″W	Category A	20073	Upload Photo
Schoolhill And Belmont Street, Former Aberdeen Academy Building				57°08′51″N 2°06′04″W	Category B	20081	Upload Photo
Spital, St Margaret Of Scotland Chapel And Former Convent Wing				57°09′27″N 2°06′00″W	Category A	19961	Upload Photo
20 And 22 Back Wynd				57°08′51″N 2°06′02″W	Category B	19969	Upload Photo
Woodside Parish Church, (Former Woodside South Church ) (C. Of S.) Church Street And King Street, Woodside				57°10′13″N 2°07′36″W	Category B	19976	Upload Photo
Westburn Road, And Argyll Place Victoria Park At Watson Street, Lodge				57°09′09″N 2°07′09″W	Category C(S)	46990	Upload Photo
44 Belgrave Terrace, Including Boundary Wall				57°08′52″N 2°07′10″W	Category C(S)	47457	Upload Photo
2 Hamilton Place, At Craigie Loanings And Westfield Road, Including Gatepiers And Boundary Walls				57°08′56″N 2°07′21″W	Category C(S)	47484	Upload Photo
Skene Street And Esslemont Avenue, Aberdeen Grammar School, Language Block (Formerly Part Of Westfield School)				57°08′51″N 2°06′53″W	Category B	47493	Upload Photo
13 Bayview Road, Including Gatepiers And Boundary Walls				57°08′31″N 2°08′27″W	Category C(S)	47918	Upload Photo
8 Holburn Street (Now Forming Part Of 1 Alford Place)				57°08′34″N 2°06′44″W	Category C(S)	47928	Upload Photo
32 Anderson Drive, Including Boundary Walls				57°08′07″N 2°08′09″W	Category C(S)	48520	Upload Photo
Rosemount Viaduct, Bon Accord Free Church				57°08′54″N 2°06′35″W	Category C(S)	48974	Upload Photo
11 And 12 Russell Road, Smoke House				57°08′22″N 2°05′43″W	Category C(S)	50220	Upload Photo
Frederick Street, Frederick Street Business Centre, (Former Frederick Street School), Including Boundary Wall				57°09′01″N 2°05′30″W	Category C(S)	50944	Upload Photo
26 John Street				57°09′05″N 2°06′08″W	Category C(S)	50947	Upload Photo
54 Castle Street				57°08′50″N 2°05′36″W	Category B	43850	Upload Photo
Polmuir Avenue, Ferryhill Motive Power Depot, Locomotive Turntable				57°07′52″N 2°05′59″W	Category A	43378	Upload Photo
83 Westburn Road, Air Raid Shelter In Garden To Rear				57°09′09″N 2°07′02″W	Category C(S)	43022	Upload Photo
68 Rubislaw Den North, Including Gatepiers And Boundary Walls				57°08′40″N 2°08′32″W	Category B	20783	Upload Photo
76 Rubislaw Den North At Moray Place, Including Ancillary Structure, Gatepiers And Boundary Walls				57°08′39″N 2°08′36″W	Category C(S)	20787	Upload Photo
20 Rubislaw Den South, Including Gatepiers And Boundary Walls				57°08′35″N 2°08′14″W	Category C(S)	20801	Upload Photo
36 And 38 Rubislaw Den South, Including Gatepiers, Railings And Boundary Walls				57°08′34″N 2°08′22″W	Category C(S)	20809	Upload Photo
44, 44A And 44B Rubislaw Den South, Including Gates, Gatepiers, Railings And Boundary Walls				57°08′34″N 2°08′27″W	Category B	20811	Upload Photo
46 Rubislaw Den South, Beechwood, Including Gatepiers And Boundary Walls				57°08′33″N 2°08′29″W	Category C(S)	20812	Upload Photo
74 Riverside Drive, Former Park Hotel, Including Gatepiers And Boundary Walls				57°07′35″N 2°07′07″W	Category B	20835	Upload Photo
7-21 (Odd Nos) St Nicholas Street				57°08′50″N 2°05′54″W	Category B	20685	Upload Photo
31 Forest Road At Desswood Place And Beaconsfield Place, Callan Lodge, Including Gatepiers And Boundary Walls				57°08′39″N 2°08′03″W	Category B	20695	Upload Photo
13 Queen's Road, Including Gatepiers And Boundary Walls				57°08′31″N 2°07′50″W	Category B	20714	Upload Photo
15 Queen's Road, Including Ancillary Structure, Railings, Gatepiers And Boundary Walls				57°08′31″N 2°07′51″W	Category B	20715	Upload Photo
21 Queen's Road, Albyn School For Girls, Including Ancillary Structure, Gatepiers And Boundary Walls				57°08′30″N 2°07′55″W	Category B	20718	Upload Photo
25, 27 And 29 Queen's Road, Including Gatepiers And Boundary Walls				57°08′29″N 2°08′00″W	Category C(S)	20721	Upload Photo
61 And 63 Queen's Road, Including Gatepiers And Boundary Walls				57°08′26″N 2°08′12″W	Category B	20732	Upload Photo
80 Queen's Road, Including Gatepiers And Boundary Walls				57°08′28″N 2°08′20″W	Category B	20748	Upload Photo
82 Queen's Road, Including Gatepiers And Boundary Walls				57°08′27″N 2°08′21″W	Category B	20749	Upload Photo
86 Queen's Road At Bayview Road, Including Railings, Gatepiers And Boundary Walls				57°08′27″N 2°08′24″W	Category C(S)	20751	Upload Photo
21 Rubislaw Den North, Including Gatepiers And Boundary Wall				57°08′39″N 2°08′26″W	Category C(S)	20767	Upload Photo
23 Exchange Street				57°08′44″N 2°05′48″W	Category C(S)	20656	Upload Photo
Blaikie's Quay, Former National Dock Labour Board				57°08′42″N 2°05′22″W	Category C(S)	20672	Upload Photo
7, 9 And 11 St Nicholas Lane				57°08′49″N 2°05′54″W	Category C(S)	20682	Upload Photo
55 Westburn Road, Including Boundary Walls				57°09′10″N 2°06′56″W	Category B	20598	Upload Photo
Union Street, 245-255 (Odd Nos)				57°08′40″N 2°06′20″W	Category B	20536	Upload Photo
136-144 (Even Nos) Union Street And 5 Denburn Road				57°08′46″N 2°06′04″W	Category B	20557	Upload Photo
154 Union Street				57°08′44″N 2°06′13″W	Category C(S)	20561	Upload Photo
212, 214, 216 Union Street				57°08′41″N 2°06′22″W	Category C(S)	20566	Upload Photo
Union Street, 230				57°08′40″N 2°06′24″W	Category B	20571	Upload Photo
Union Terrace, 1, 2, 3 And 146 Union Street				57°08′45″N 2°06′10″W	Category A	20573	Upload Photo
Union Terrace, 14				57°08′47″N 2°06′14″W	Category C(S)	20574	Upload Photo
Union Terrace, 16				57°08′47″N 2°06′15″W	Category B	20576	Upload Photo
24 And 26 Upperkirkgate				57°08′56″N 2°05′54″W	Category B	20581	Upload Photo
Skene Terrace, 52				57°08′50″N 2°06′29″W	Category C(S)	20507	Upload Photo
168-174 (Even Nos) Market Street, Former Grimsby Chambers				57°08′34″N 2°05′34″W	Category B	20449	Upload Photo
Footdee, 5 New Pier Road				57°08′34″N 2°04′19″W	Category C(S)	20452	Upload Photo
32 And 34 Queen's Road (Former Rubislaw Toll House), Including Boundary Walls				57°08′31″N 2°08′02″W	Category C(S)	20458	Upload Photo
46 And 47 Regent Quay				57°08′48″N 2°05′25″W	Category C(S)	20465	Upload Photo
20-26 (Even Nos) King Street				57°08′56″N 2°05′36″W	Category C(S)	20397	Upload Photo
30 And 32 King Street				57°08′57″N 2°05′36″W	Category B	20399	Upload Photo
Don Street, 78 (East Side) Bishop's Gate, Old Aberdeen				57°10′08″N 2°05′56″W	Category B	20295	Upload Photo
Don Street, (N.W. Side) Raeholm				57°10′40″N 2°05′59″W	Category B	20304	Upload Photo
111 Gallowgate Including Boundary Wall And Railings				57°09′03″N 2°05′57″W	Category C(S)	20316	Upload Photo
College Bounds, 8 (East Side) Old Aberdeen				57°09′43″N 2°06′05″W	Category B	20223	Upload Photo
College Bounds, 24 (East Side) Old Aberdeen				57°09′44″N 2°06′05″W	Category B	20228	Upload Photo
College Bounds, 26 (East Side) Old Aberdeen				57°09′45″N 2°06′05″W	Category B	20229	Upload Photo
Don Street, 23 (West Side) Old Aberdeen				57°10′04″N 2°06′07″W	Category B	20276	Upload Photo
Chanonry, 6 (East Side) Old Aberdeen				57°10′05″N 2°06′09″W	Category B	20183	Upload Photo
Chanonry, 7 And 7A (West Side) Old Aberdeen				57°10′06″N 2°06′12″W	Category B	20184	Upload Photo
Chanonry, 20 (Chaplain's Court)				57°10′08″N 2°06′00″W	Category B	20200	Upload Photo
Chanonry, 20 Boundary Wall				57°10′08″N 2°06′00″W	Category B	20201	Upload Photo
Clark's Lane, 1, 2, Old Aberdeen				57°10′07″N 2°05′56″W	Category B	20204	Upload Photo
College Bounds, 19 Garden Wall				57°09′45″N 2°06′07″W	Category B	20211	Upload Photo
25 Albyn Place At Albyn Grove, Including Boundary Walls				57°08′34″N 2°07′11″W	Category B	20119	Upload Photo
10 Bon Accord Street (Svl), 31 Langstane Place, East Craibstone Street And Frontage To Bon Accord Square				57°08′37″N 2°06′23″W	Category B	20138	Upload Photo
Ashley Road, Ashley Road School, Including Ancillary Structure, Lodge, Gates, Gatepiers, Boundary Walls And Railings				57°08′17″N 2°07′24″W	Category C(S)	20085	Upload Photo
Broad Street, Marischal College				57°08′59″N 2°05′49″W	Category A	20096	Upload Photo
Friendville Great Western Road And Thorngrove Avenue				57°07′58″N 2°08′10″W	Category B	20102	Upload Photo
Westburn Road And Cornhill Road, Westburn Park, Westburn House, Including Railings				57°09′16″N 2°07′22″W	Category A	20108	Upload Photo
22 Adelphi				57°08′48″N 2°05′44″W	Category C(S)	20112	Upload Photo
Union Street, South Silver Street And Golden Square, Music Hall				57°08′44″N 2°06′18″W	Category A	19991	Upload Photo
Castlegate, Mercat Cross				57°08′54″N 2°05′33″W	Category A	19999	Upload Photo
Duthie Park, Mcgrigor Obelisk				57°07′45″N 2°06′13″W	Category C(S)	20010	Upload another image See more images
Fonthill Road At Hardgate, March Stone No 2				57°08′15″N 2°06′49″W	Category C(S)	20015	Upload Photo
Nellfield Place At Great Western Road, Adjoining Nellfield Cemetery, March Stone Number 3				57°08′20″N 2°07′04″W	Category C(S)	20016	Upload Photo
March Stone No. 8, At 37 Craigton Road Nearly Opposite Kenfield Crescent				57°07′51″N 2°08′36″W	Category B	20021	Upload Photo
March Stone No. 11, On South Side Of Craigton Road About 70 Yards West Of The House 'East Rocklands'				57°07′29″N 2°10′06″W	Category B	20024	Upload Photo
Well Spring Of Nether Town, Hazledene Road				57°08′25″N 2°09′49″W	Category C(S)	20056	Upload Photo
St. Peter's Cemetery, Gates. King Street				57°09′37″N 2°05′47″W	Category B	20060	Upload Photo

== Key ==
The scheme for classifying buildings in Scotland is:

- Category A: "buildings of national or international importance, either architectural or historic; or fine, little-altered examples of some particular period, style or building type."
- Category B: "buildings of regional or more than local importance; or major examples of some particular period, style or building type, which may have been altered."
- Category C: "buildings of local importance; lesser examples of any period, style, or building type, as originally constructed or moderately altered; and simple traditional buildings which group well with other listed buildings."

In March 2016 there were 47,288 listed buildings in Scotland. Of these, 8% were Category A, and 50% were Category B, with the remaining 42% being Category C.

== See also ==
- List of listed buildings in Aberdeen
