= Aberdeen Sheriff Court Annex and High Court of Justiciary =

Judicial building in Aberdeen, Scotland

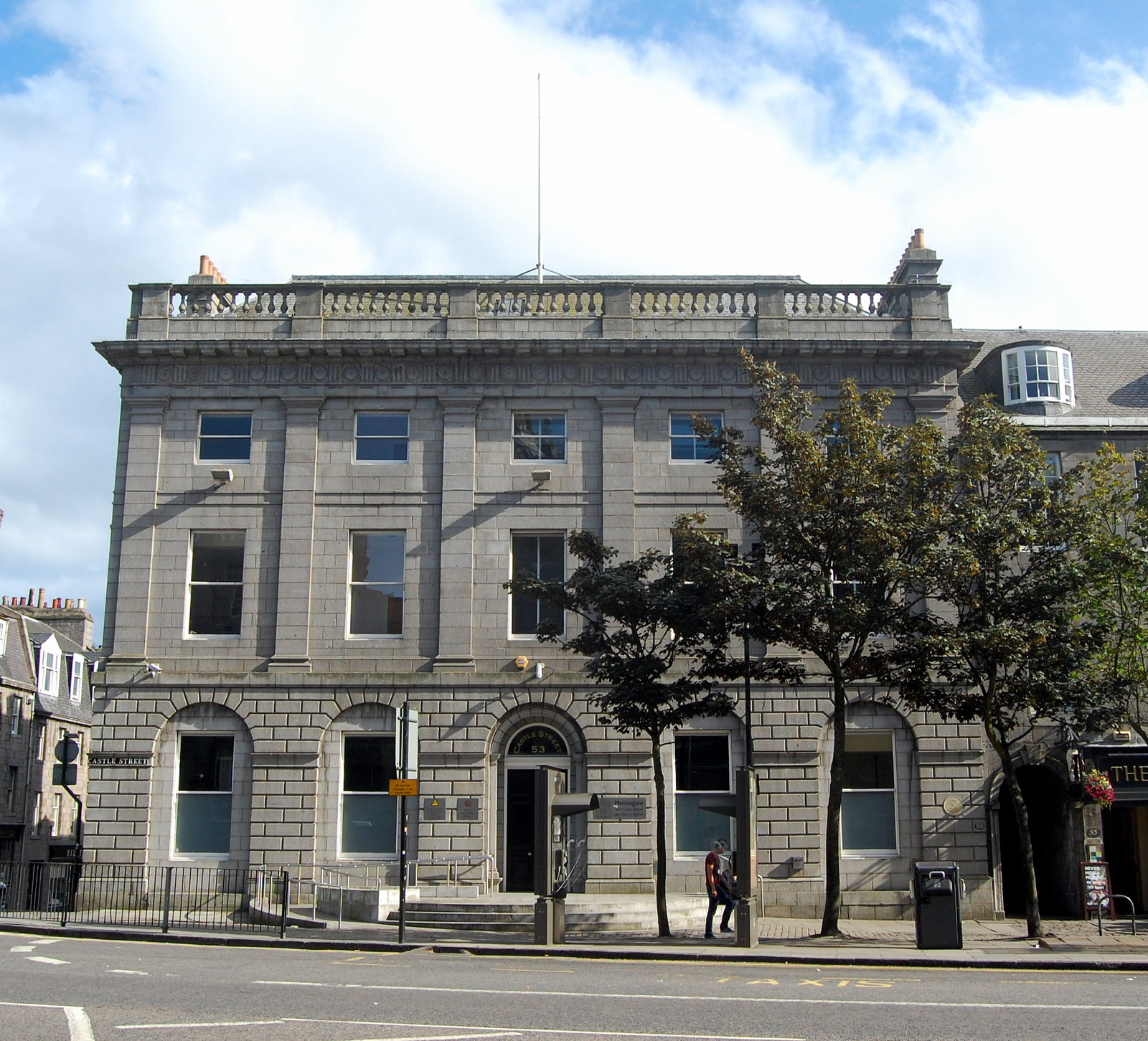
- Aberdeen Sheriff Court Annex and High Court of Justiciary

- Shown in Aberdeen
- 57.1476°N 2.0936°W
- Location: Castle Street, Aberdeen

History
- Built: 1801

Site notes
- Architect: James Burn
- Architectural style: Neoclassical style

Listed Building – Category A
- Official name: Aberdeen Sheriff Court Annex and High Court of Justiciary (Formerly Bank Of Scotland), 53 Castle Street, Aberdeen
- Designated: 12 January 1967
- Reference no.: LB20174

The Aberdeen Sheriff Court Annex and High Court of Justiciary, also known as Mercatgate, is a judicial building in Castle Street, Aberdeen, Scotland. The building, which operates in conjunction with similar facilities in Edinburgh and Glasgow, is provided for the use of the High Court of Justiciary, which is the supreme criminal court in Scotland. It is a Category A listed building.

== History ==
The building was commissioned as a banking hall for the Aberdeen Banking Company which had been founded in 1767. It was designed by James Burn in the neoclassical style, built in ashlar stone and was completed in 1801.

The design involved a symmetrical main frontage of five bays facing onto Castle Street. The central bay featured a doorway with a round headed fanlight flanked by colonnettes supporting voussoirs. The other bays on the ground floor, which was rusticated, contained sash window within round headed recesses, while the bays on the upper floors were fenestrated by tall sash windows on the first floor and by square sash windows on the second floor. The windows on the upper floors were flanked by Doric order pilasters supporting a frieze, which was decorated with triglyphs and discs, and by a modillioned cornice and a balustraded parapet.

After getting into serious financial difficulty, the bank was acquired by the Union Bank of Scotland in 1849. It was extended by two bays along Marischal Street to a design by William Smith in 1859. Part of the building was then used as a printer's office in the late 19th century but most of the building remained in use as a branch of the Union Bank of Scotland until 1955, and then of the Bank of Scotland until the early 21st century. (Note: The Union Bank of Scotland merged with the Bank of Scotland in 1955.)

The building was subsequently acquired by the Scottish Courts and Tribunals Service and was extensively remodelled between 2004 and 2005 to a design by Oberlanders Architects / David Murray Associates to accommodate criminal case hearings of the Aberdeen Sheriff Court where solemn proceedings are employed, i.e. the judges are assisted by a jury of fifteen members selected from the electoral roll. The modifications were also intended to accommodate hearings of the High Court of Justiciary, which is the supreme criminal court in Scotland. (Note: The High Court of Justiciary only meets in Aberdeen when there are cases to try there.)

The building was the venue for the preliminary hearing in the trial of the businessman, Craig Whyte, on fraud charges in March 2017. He was referred for trial at Glasgow High Court but, after a lengthy legal proceedings, was acquitted of all charges in June 2017.

== See also ==
- List of Category A listed buildings in Aberdeen
- List of listed buildings in Aberdeen/6
