= Tullos =

Area of Aberdeen, Scotland

Coordinates: 57°7′25″N 2°4′56″W

Tullos: Scottish Gaelic: Tulach
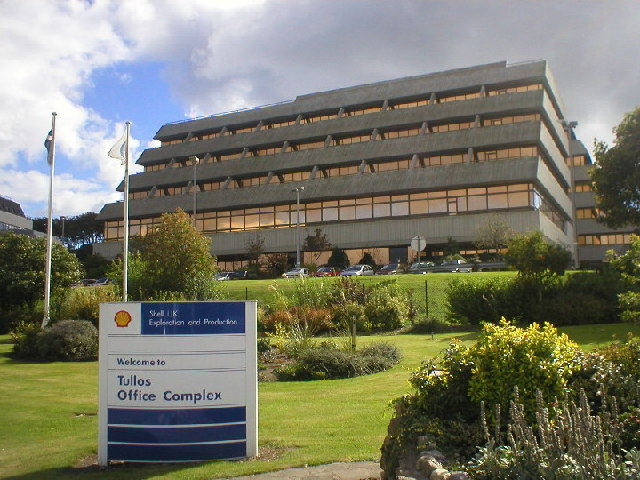
- The Shell offices, Tullos (demolished in 2024)

- Location within the Aberdeen City council area Location within Scotland
- Council area: Aberdeen City
- Lieutenancy area: Aberdeen
- Country: Scotland
- Sovereign state: United Kingdom
- Postcode district: AB
- Police: Scotland
- Fire: Scottish
- Ambulance: Scottish

Tullos (Scots pronunciation: [ˈtʌləz]) is an area of Aberdeen, Scotland. The area takes its name from the Vale of Tullos, which lies between Tullos Hill and Torry Hill. Tullos derived its name from a corruption of the Gaelic ‘Tulach’ meaning a hill.

In this extract from the "Book of St. Fittick", published in 1902, Dr. Thomas White Ogilvie describes what the scene looked like in his day.

"It is full of quiet charm, this little glen, with its Kirk on the height and its Kirk in the hollow, extending from the great gap in the cliff, which forms the Bay, up to the river, where, with majestic bend, it sweeps glittering and gurgling by Allenvale and Duthie Park, sweetest of resting places for the quick and the dead."

The scene is very different today. In 1850 the Caledonian, Great North of Scotland and North British Railways began to provide rail links to Aberdeen. The main line cut through the Vale of Tullos. The area south of the railway line is full of car showrooms, oil yards and waste recycling plants. Northwards, a vast area of densely packed housing covers the hillside.

Tullos is now home to the headquarters of Northsound Radio and STV North (formerly Grampian Television).

Tullos Hill is the location of four Bronze Age burial cairns, including Tullos Cairn.

== Education ==
Tullos has a primary school. A Cruyff Court, the second in Aberdeen, was opened in 2019. The court is named Neale Cooper.
