= Shiprow =

Street in Aberdeen, Scotland

Coordinates: 57.14675°N 2.09457°W

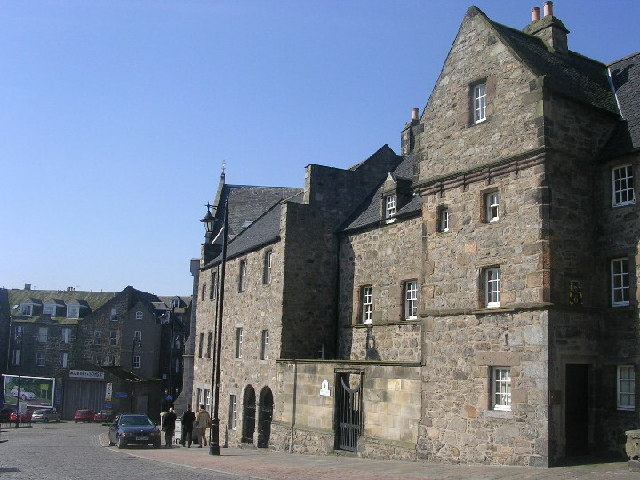
Provost Ross's house in Shiprow, 2005

Shiprow is a historic street in the heart of Aberdeen, Scotland, near the harbour. Formerly the Shiprow sloped upward more gradually than it does now, and it crossed Union Street in a depression between St Catherine's Hill on the west and Castle Street, once high uneven ground, on the east. That the Shiprow has been made up several feet can be seen by a house at the end of Exchequer Row, and it crossed Union Street and entered Broad Street at a lower level than the present.

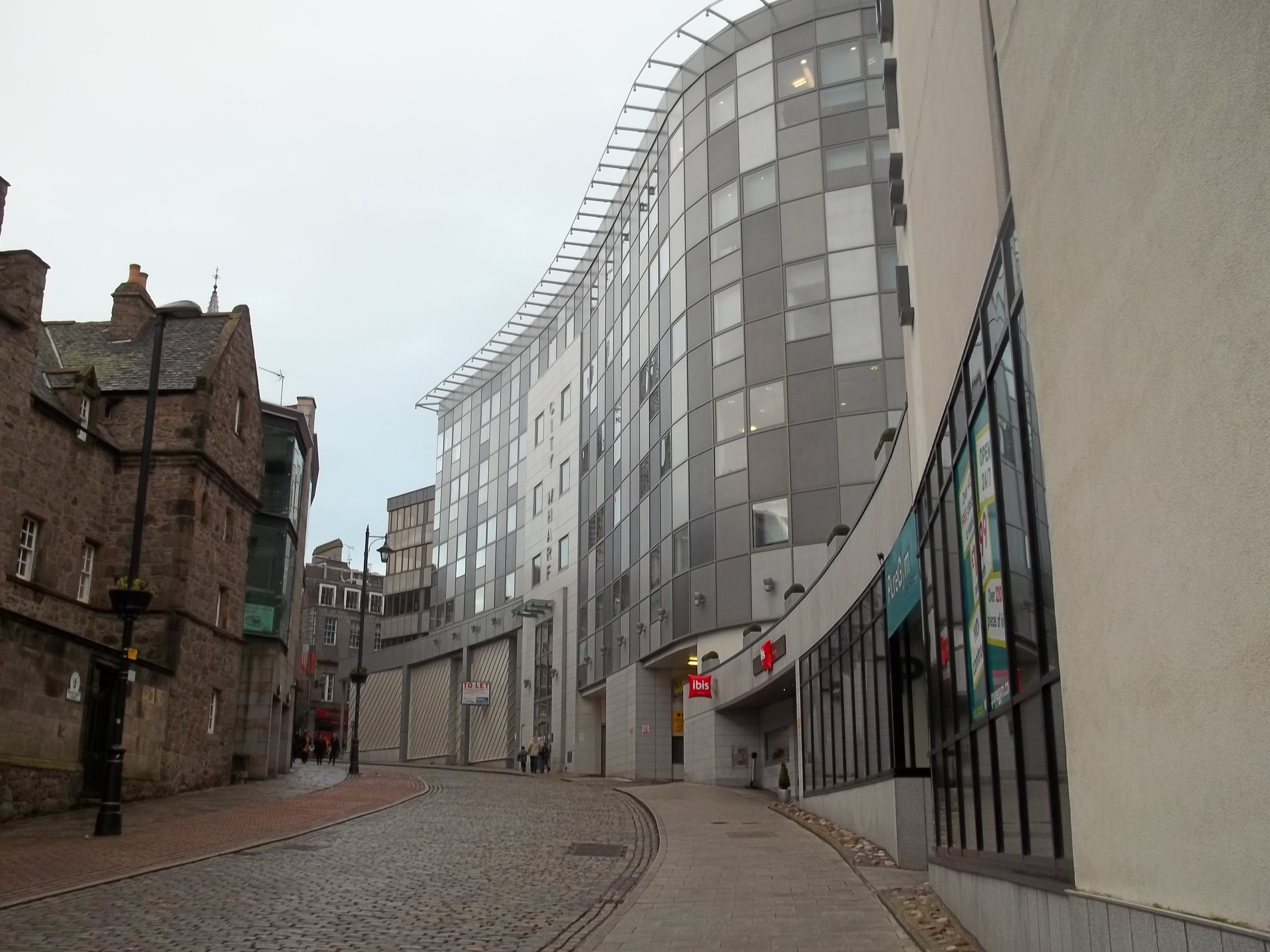
City Wharf Office Development, Shiprow, 2012

The Shiprow was one of the most important streets in the city, since it led from the harbour into the Castlegate area - the heart of Aberdeen. It is first mentioned in documents in 1281. Over the years it became more and more rundown and, although it had many historic connections, nearly all of it was demolished in the 1950s and 60s. Exchequer Row known locally as Cheq'ra Wynd (first mentioned in 1350) was a short congested lane connecting the Shiprow to the Castlegate, and on its right side, were a number of courts leading into an area crammed with insanitary dwellings which were later demolished. It was popularly supposed that the name Exchequer Row derived from the Aberdeen Mint which stood in the area. However, it comes from the name of the Royal Customs House - the Skakkarium, dating back to the 14th century.

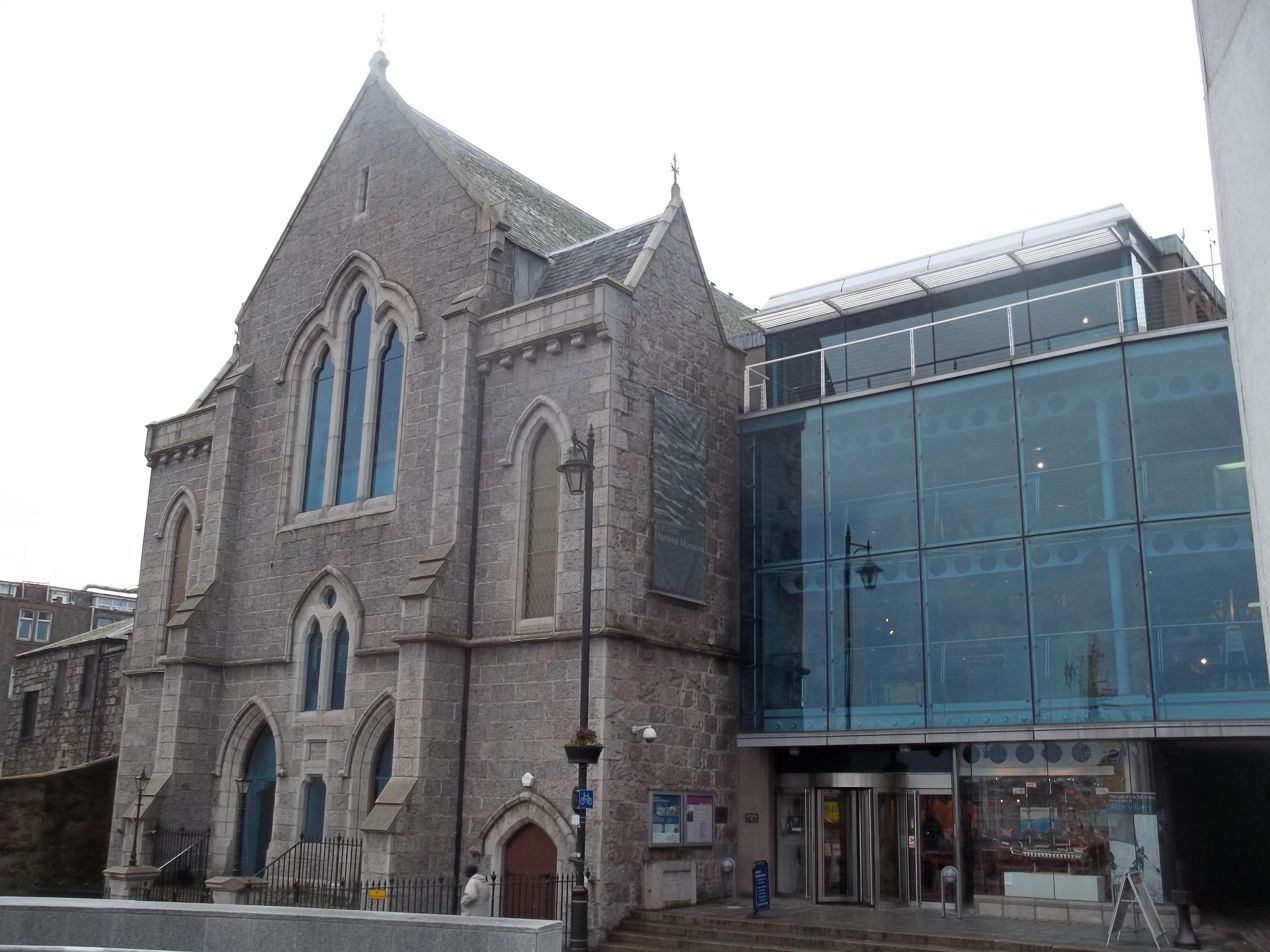
Maritime Museum, Shiprow, 2012

Provost Ross's house, dating from 1593 and the second oldest house in the city, is located here. Since 1981, it has housed part of the Aberdeen Maritime Museum.

Shiprow has changed dramatically in the last few years and now houses, alongside the Maritime Museum, the City Wharf office development, PureGym, Hotel Ibis, Lane7 Bowling Alley and Vue Cinema.
