= Provost Skene's House =

Historic house in Aberdeen, Scotland

Coordinates: 57.1483°N 2.0975°W

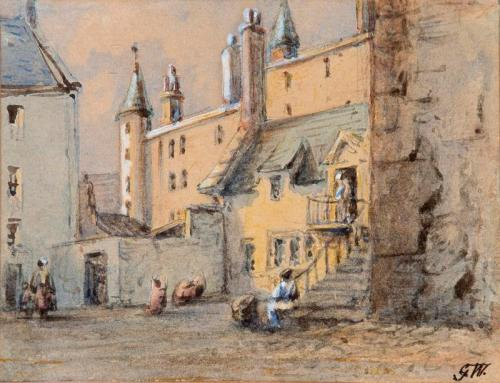
Provost Skene's House, Guestrow (circa 1850) by George Washington Wilson (Aberdeen Archives, Galleries & Museums Collections

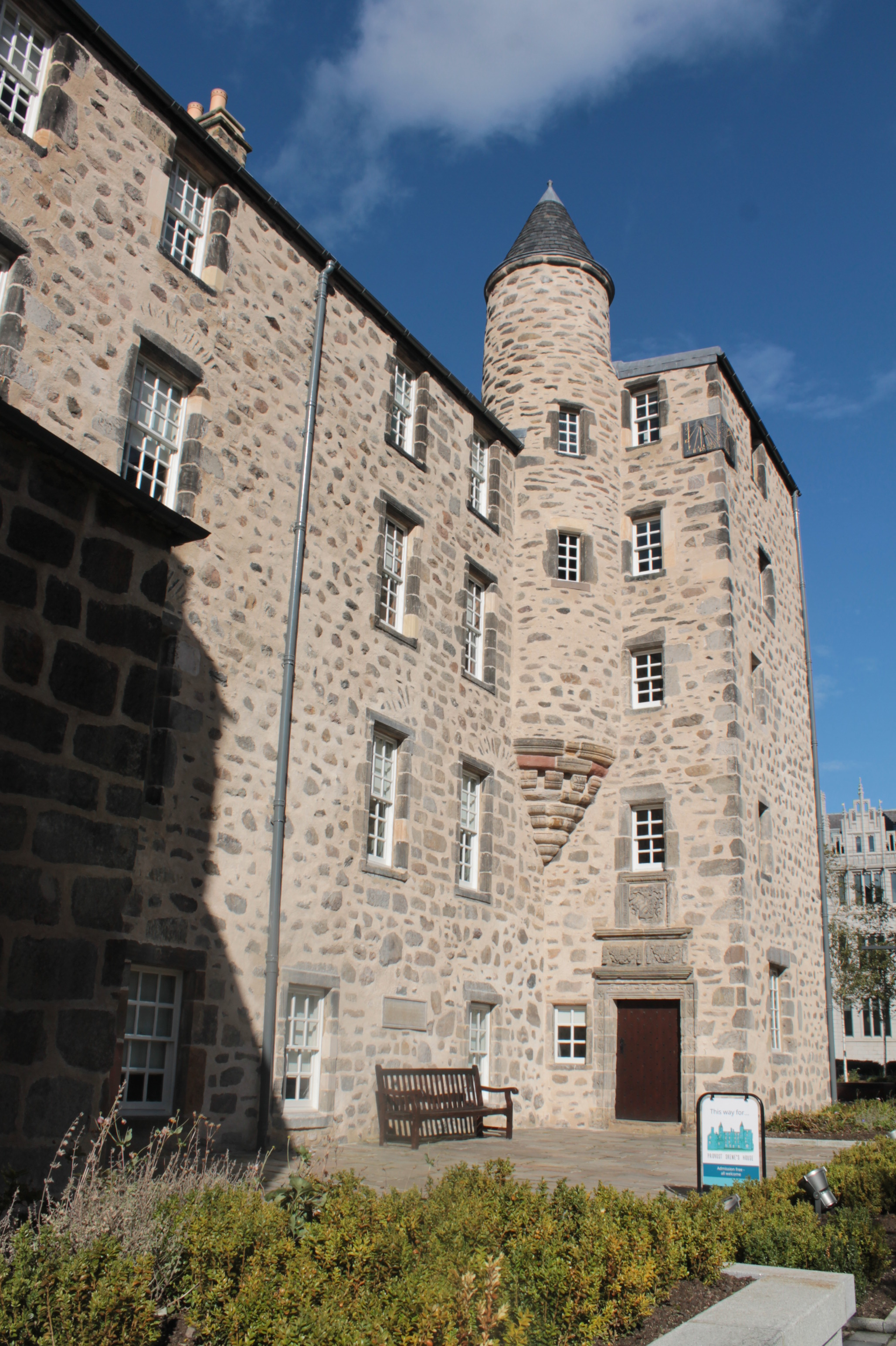
Provost Skene's House, Aberdeen

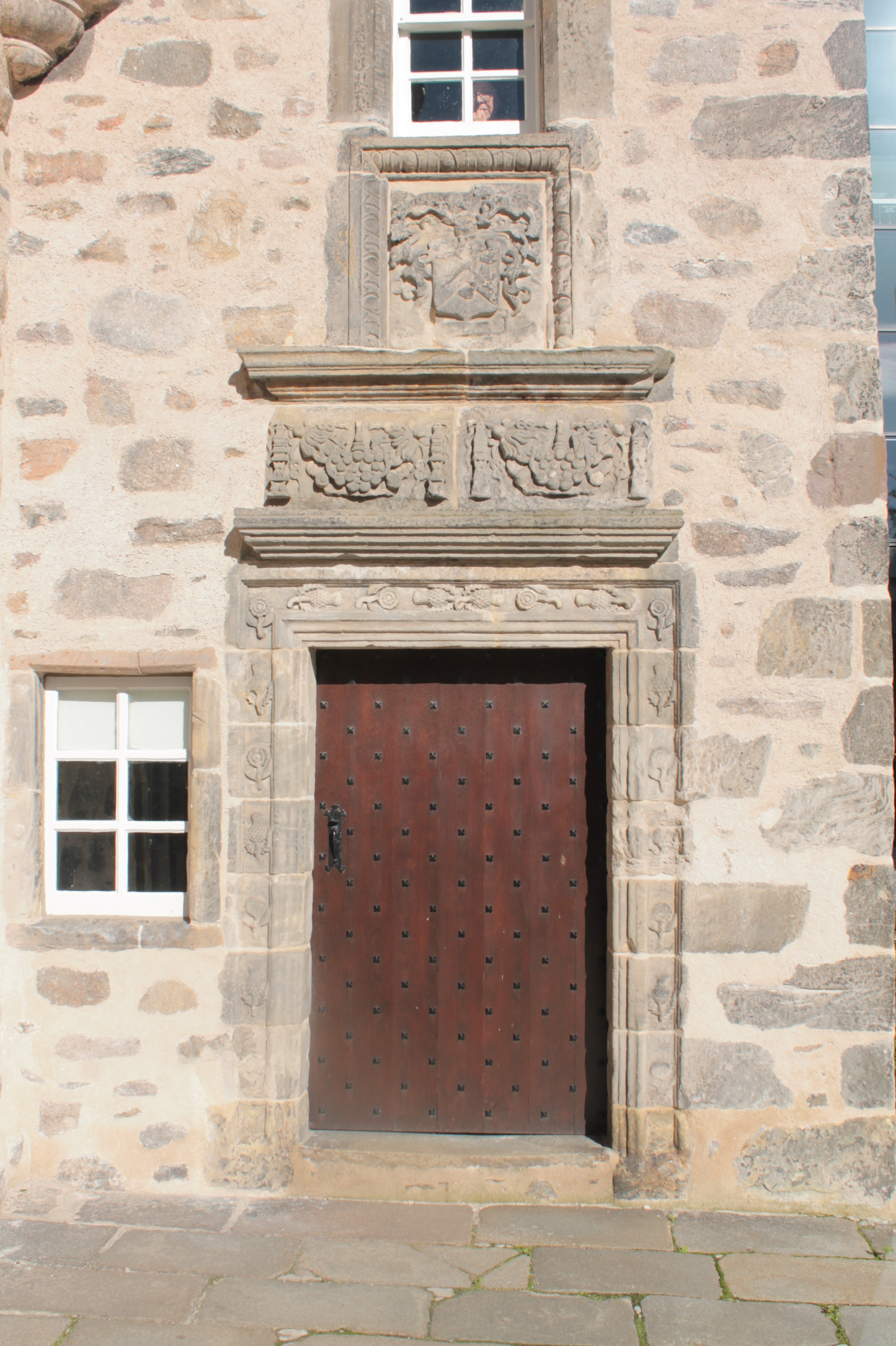
Main door, Provost Skene's House, Aberdeen

Provost Skene's House is a house in Aberdeen, built in 1545 and now housing a museum. It is named after Sir George Skene (1619–1708) who served as provost of the city of Aberdeen from 1676 to 1685. Skene bought the house in 1669 and is thought to have commissioned its 17th-century plaster ceilings.

It lies in central Aberdeen, midway between the Kirk of St Nicholas and Marischal College.

== History ==
The building was remodelled in the mid-18th century (increasing window sizes) but remains a rare survival of Aberdeen's medieval burgh architecture, with substantially intact envelope and interior. In an attic gallery a Renaissance painted ceiling, including strapwork decoration and religious scenes, was commissioned by a member of the Lumsden family.

The building was opened to the public in 1953 as a 'Period House and Museum of Local History' by Queen Elizabeth the Queen Mother. In that iteration, the rooms were furnished in the styles of the 17th, 18th and early 19th centuries. There were also displays of coins and local history. The Costume Gallery also housed regularly changing displays of period dress.

In 2021, Provost Skene's House was reopened to the public after renovations were completed. It now houses displays on singers, writers, doctors, business owners and other prominent figures who were born, lived or worked in Aberdeen. The Painted Gallery is the only part of the earlier display to be retained. Rated a three-star museum by the Scottish Tourist Board, the museum is free to the public.
