= Tullos Cairn =

Bronze Age cairn in Scotland

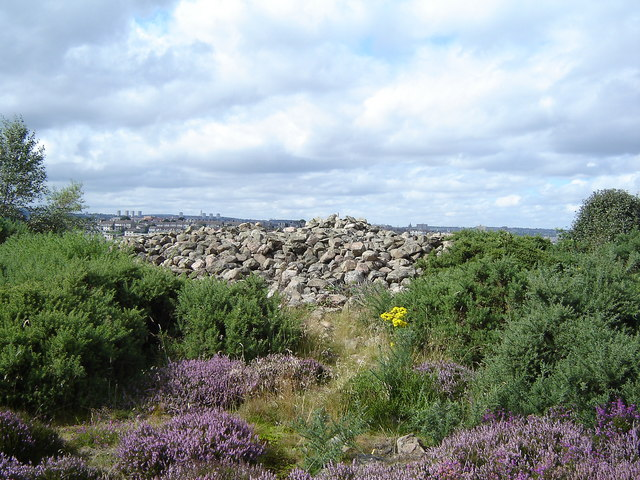
- Tullos Cairn in August 2007
- Interactive map of Tullos Cairn
- 57.1278°N 2.0695°W
- Type: Cairn
- Periods: Bronze Age
- Location: Tullos Hill, Aberdeen, Scotland

History
- Built: c. 2200-800 BC

Site notes
- Material: Stone
- Height: 2 m (6 ft 7 in)
- Diameter: 20 m (66 ft)
- Public access: Yes

Scheduled monument
- Official name: Tullos Cairn
- Type: Prehistoric ritual and funerary: cairn
- Designated: 23 December 1977
- Reference no.: SM4055

Tullos Cairn is a Bronze Age burial cairn located on the northside of Tullos Hill, in Aberdeen, Scotland. It is one of four scheduled monument cairns found on Tullos Hill. The others are Baron's, Cat and Crab's.

== See also ==
- Memsie Cairn
