= Aberdeen Maritime Museum =

Coordinates: 57.14646°N 2.09496°W

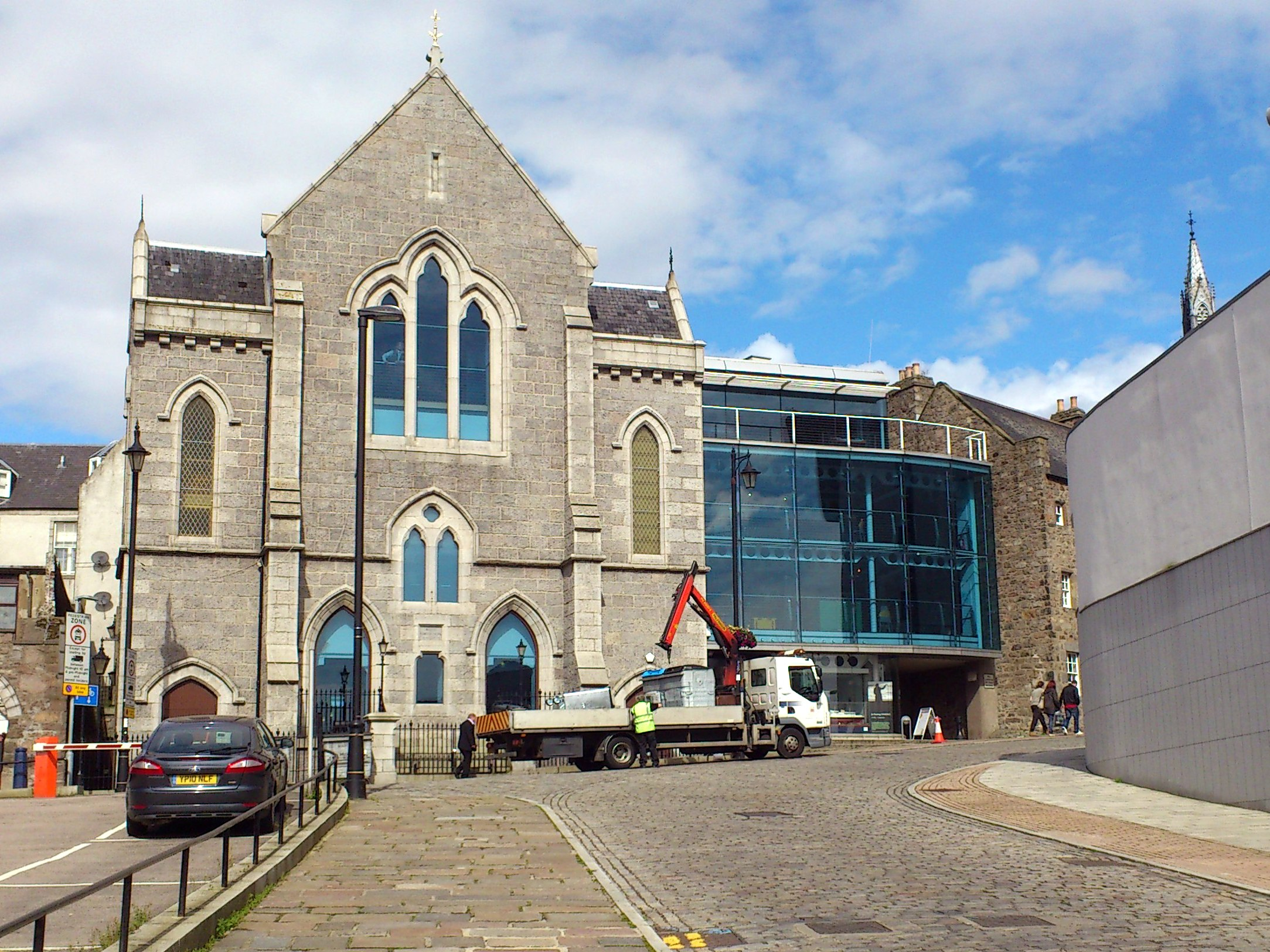
- Front of the Aberdeen Maritime Museum
- Established: 26 April 1984
- Location: Aberdeen, Scotland
- Type: Maritime museum
- Website: www.aberdeencity.gov.uk/AAGM/plan-your-visit/aberdeen-maritime-museum

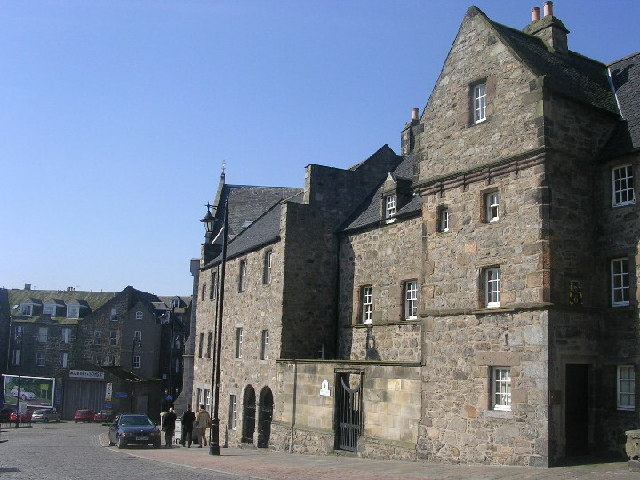
Provost Ross's house containing the museum

Aberdeen Maritime Museum is a maritime museum in Aberdeen, Scotland, located on the historic Shiprow near the city harbour. Operated by Aberdeen City Council, the museum explores the city's long relationship with the North Sea, with collections covering shipbuilding, fast sailing ships, the fishing industry, port history, and the development of the North Sea oil industry. It occupies several historic buildings, including Provost Ross' House and the former Trinity Congregational Church.

The museum is situated on the historic Shiprow in the heart of the city, near the harbour. It makes use of a range of buildings including the former Trinity Congregational Church, which was converted to be used as an extension of the museum, and Provost Ross' House, one of the oldest domestic buildings in the city.

== History ==
Provost Ross' House was built in 1593 by master-mason Andrew Jamieson and was extended to the south in 1710. In 1702 Provost John Ross of Arnage, who was a ship owner, took it as his residence. In the 19th century, the building became a set of tenements and became derelict by 1950. In 1984, the building was bought by the National Trust for Scotland who leased it to Aberdeen City Council. The building subsequently became the Aberdeen Maritime Museum, which opened on 26 April 1984

A few years after buying the building, the council bought the Trinity Congregational Church, aiming to convert it into an extension for the museum. It opened in 1997.

== Gallery ==
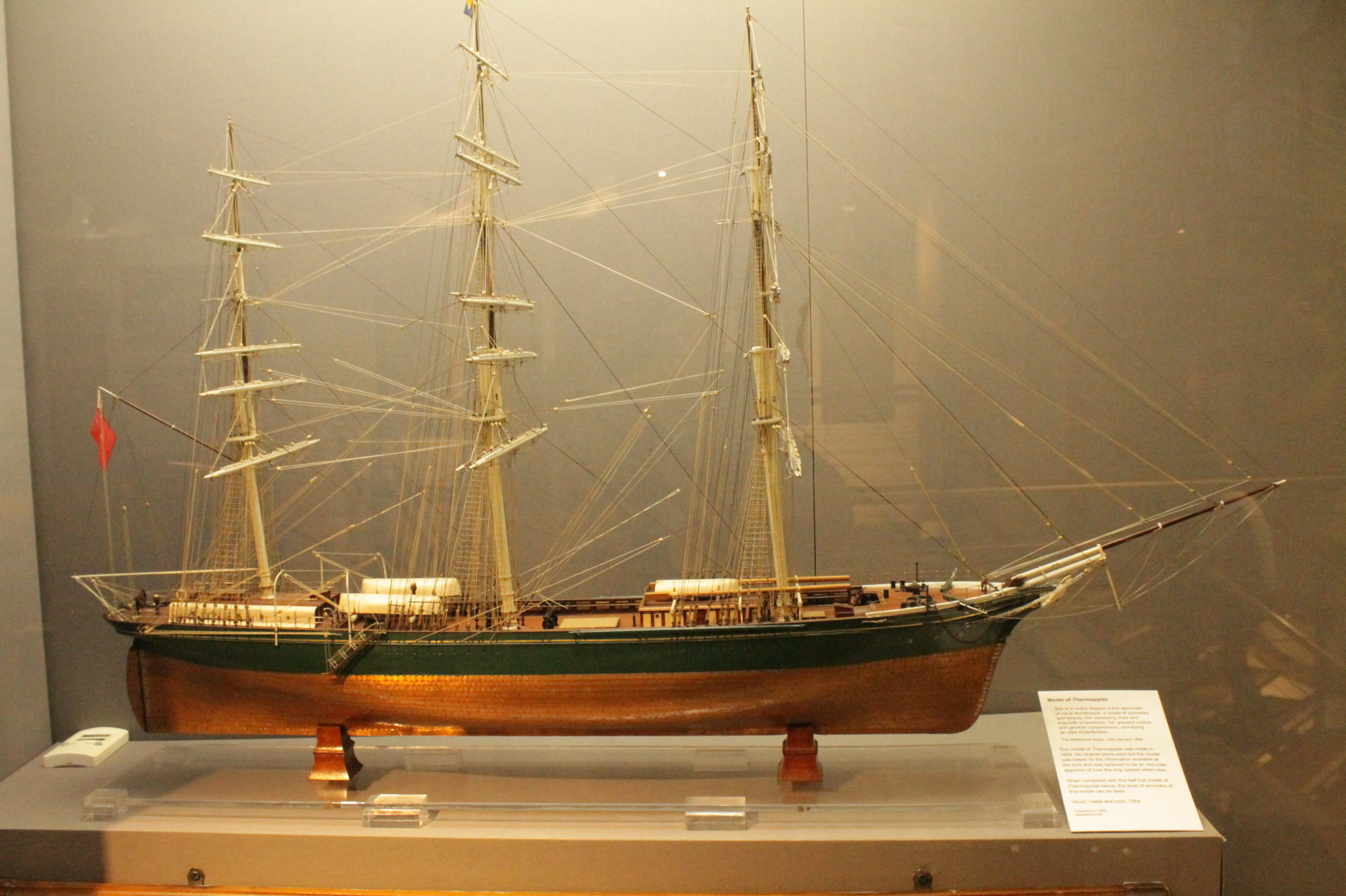
Scale Model of Thermopylae

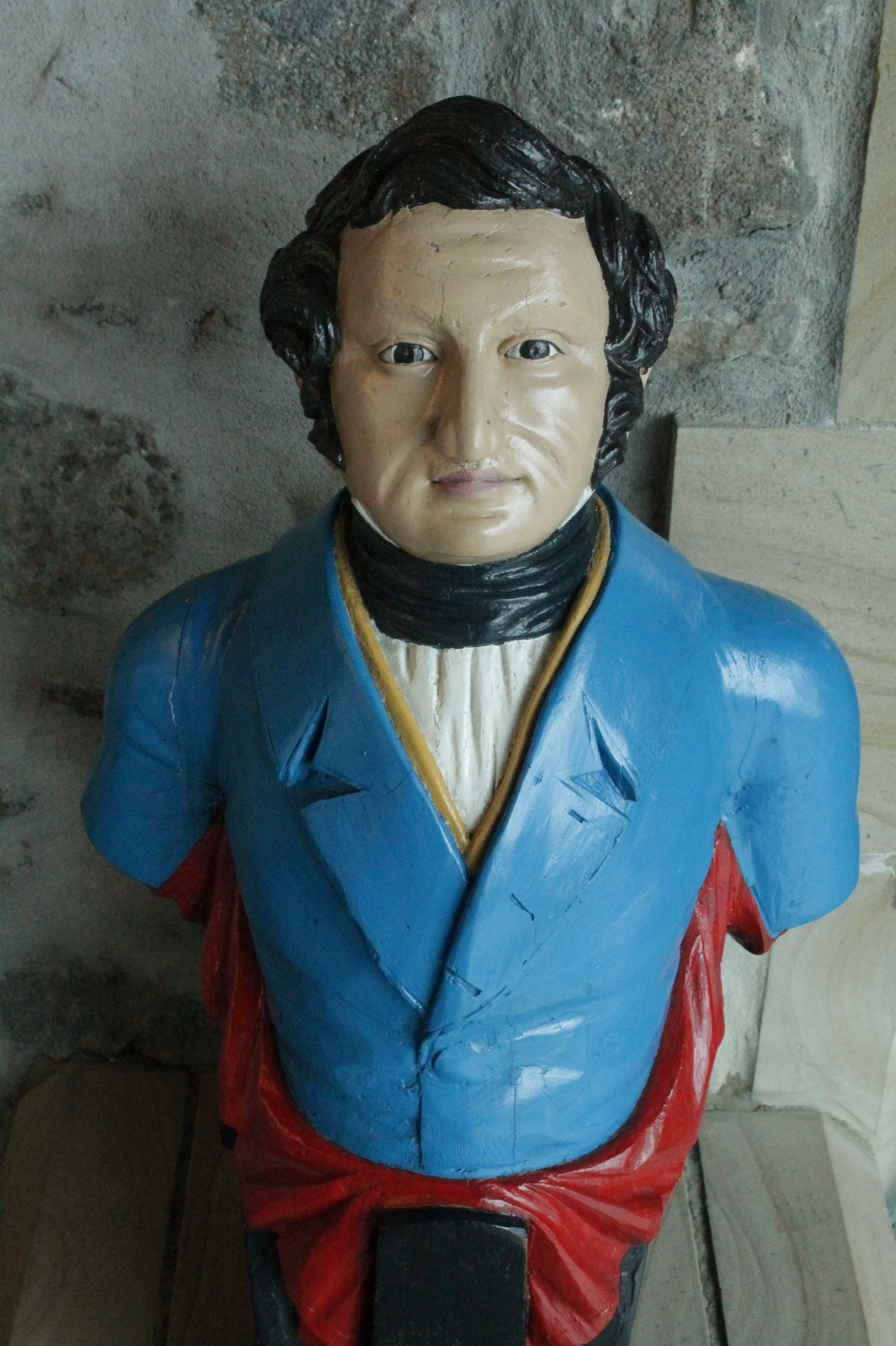
Wooden figure of Thomas Blaikie

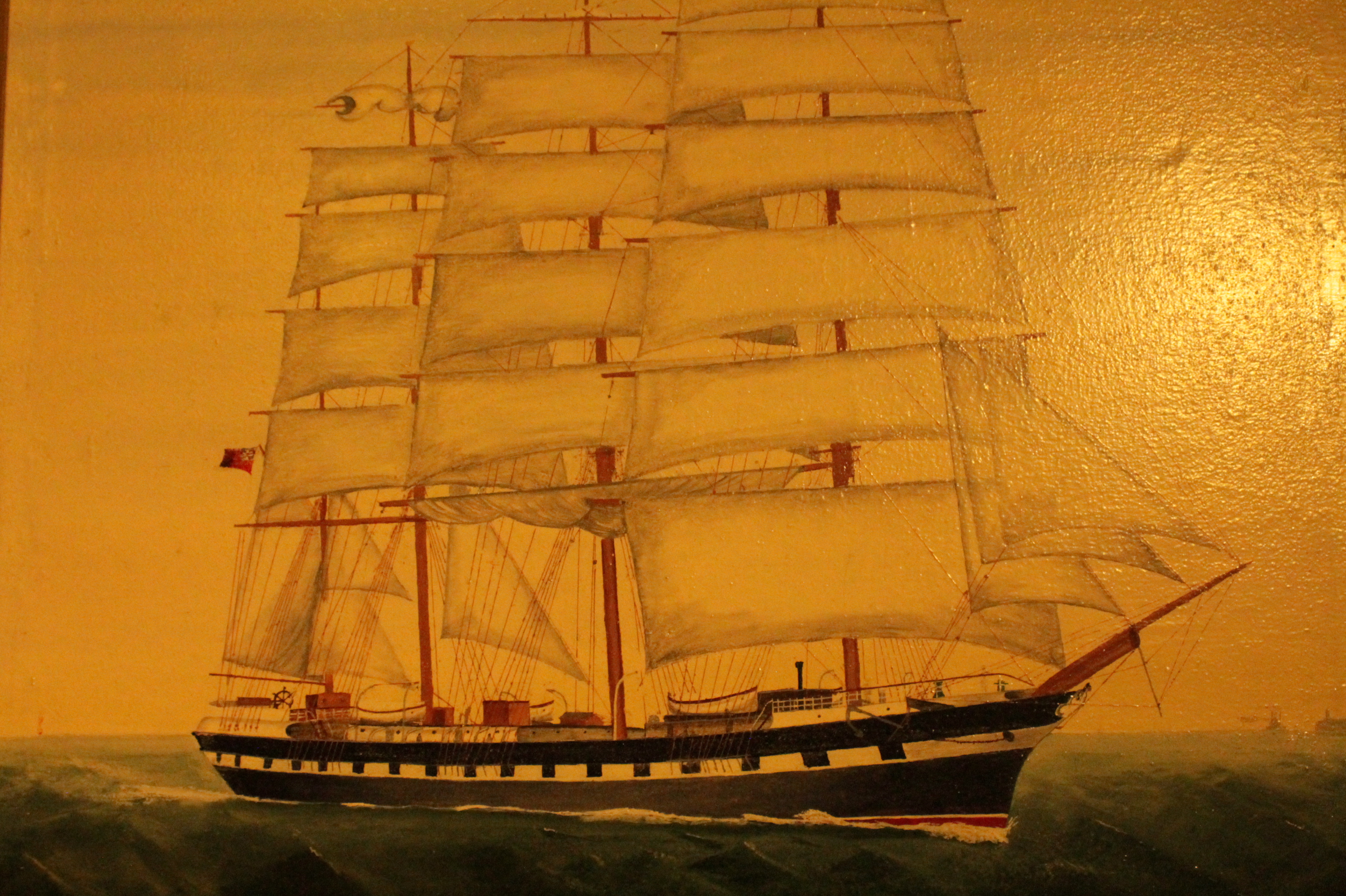
"Port Jackson" by Alexander Hall & Sons

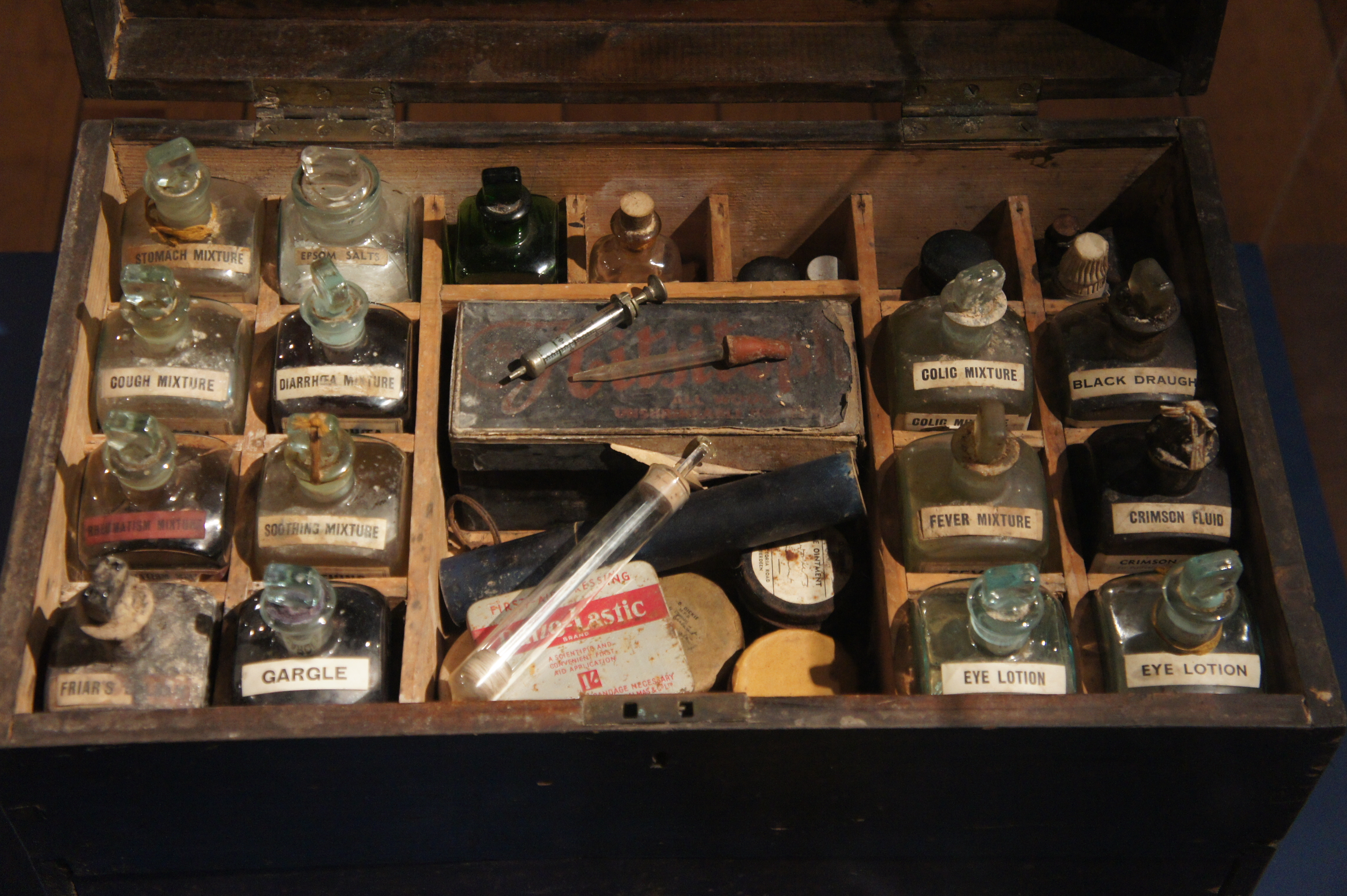
First aid kit

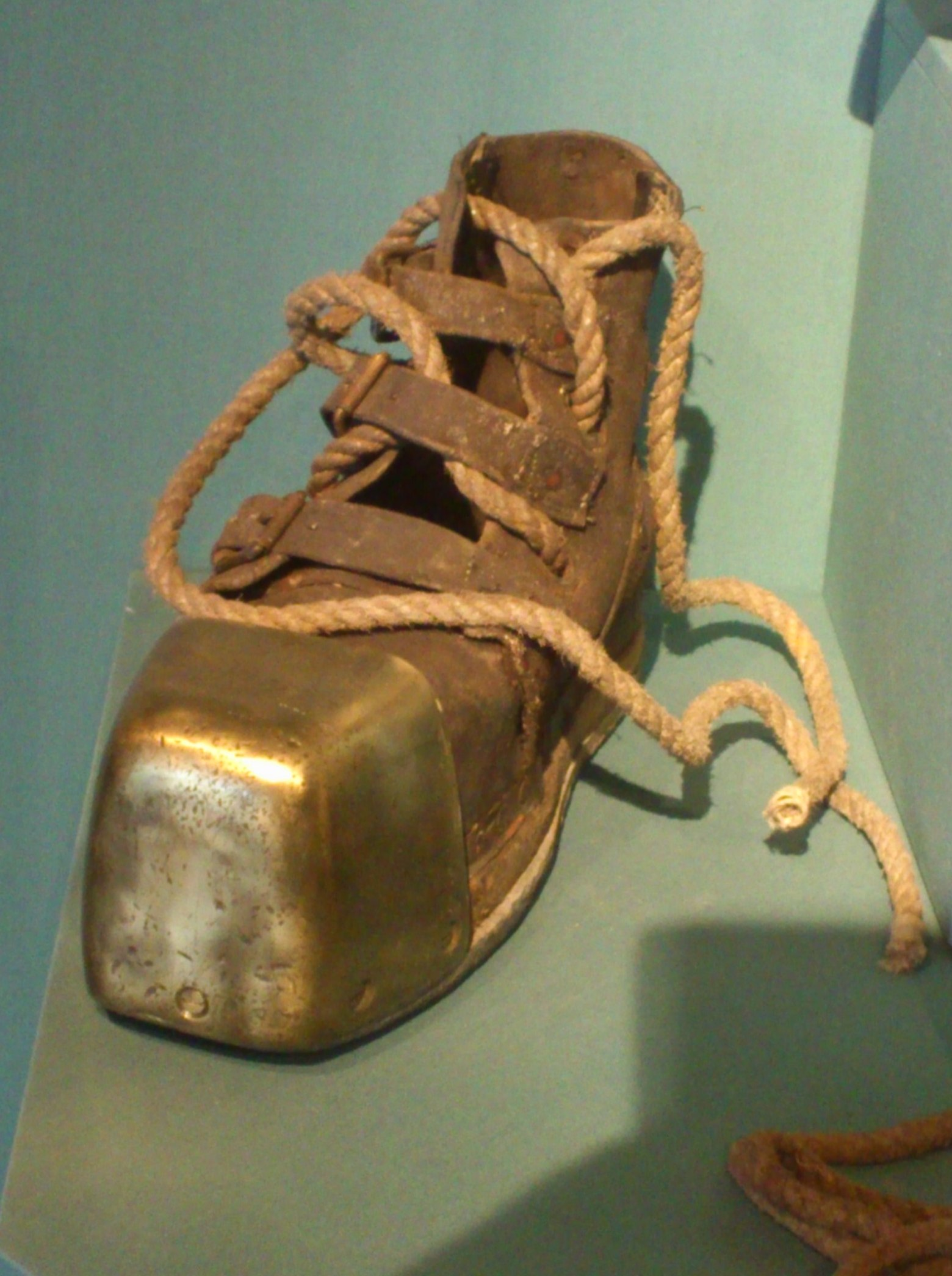
Diver's boot

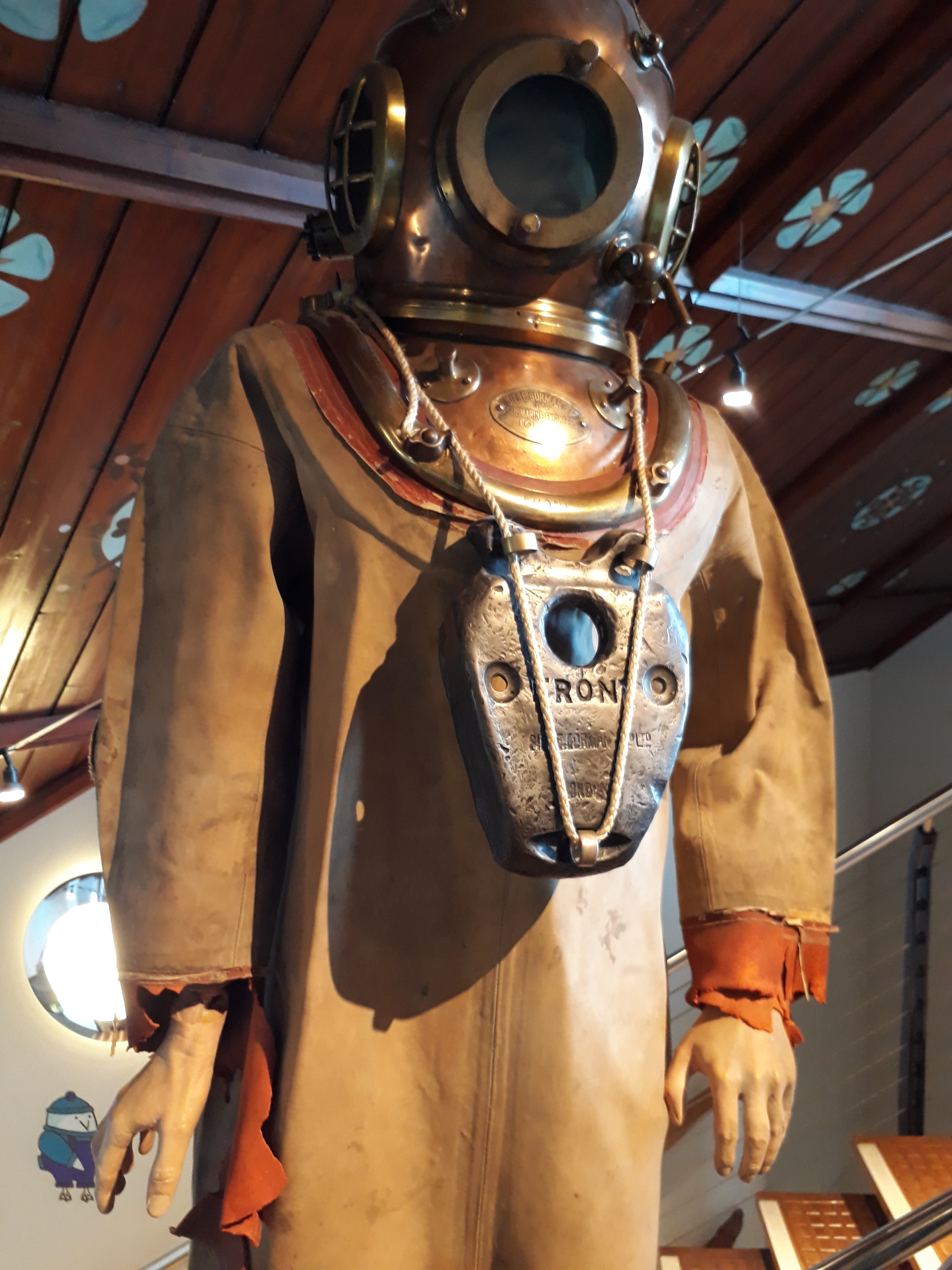
underwater gear

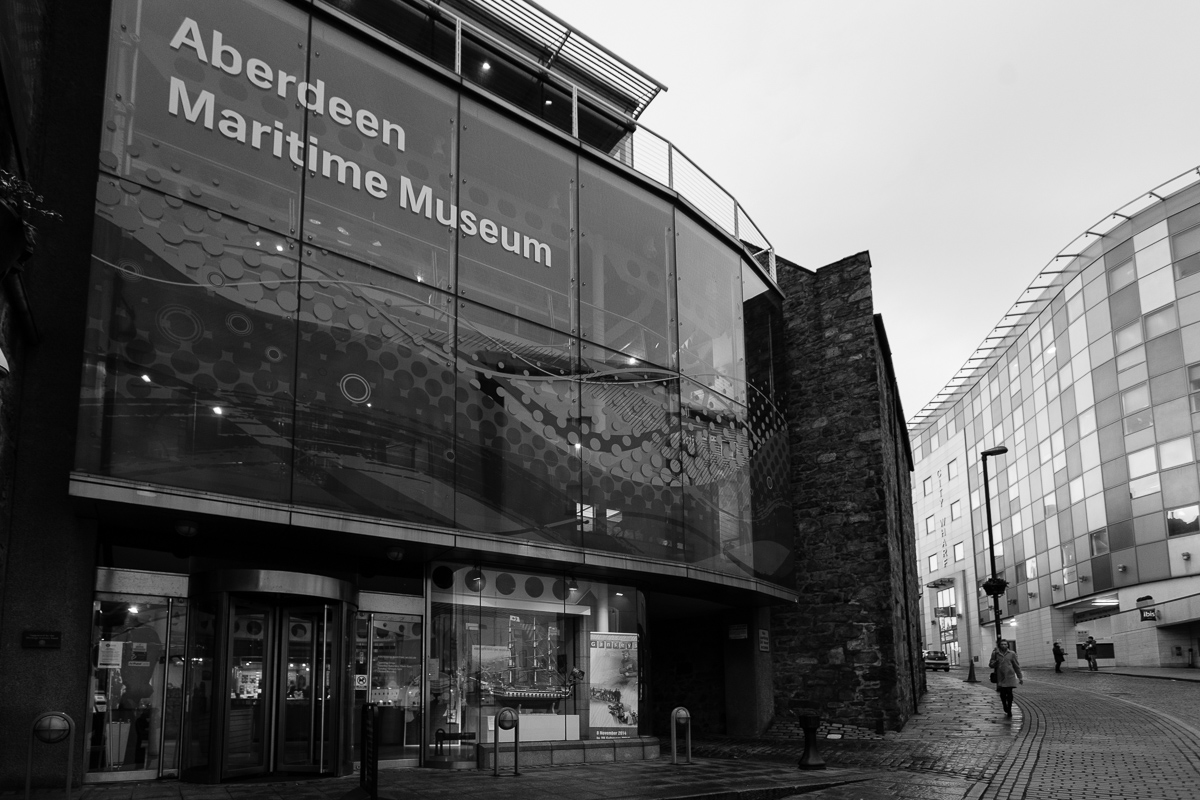

== See also ==
- List of museums in Scotland
