= Lang Stane of Auquhollie =

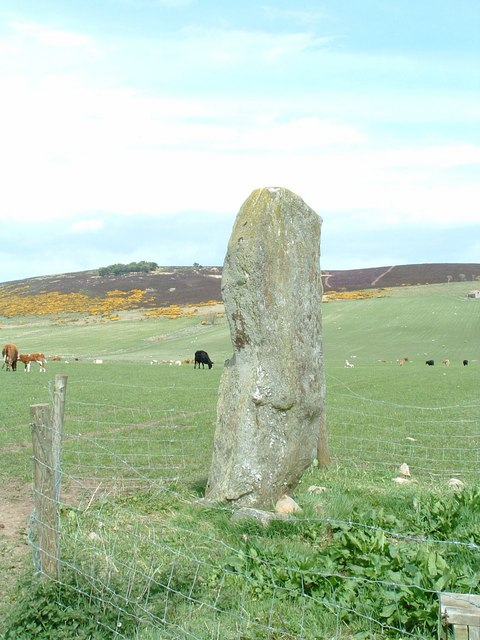
- The Lang Stane
- Symbols: Ogam
- Present location: near Stonehaven, Aberdeenshire
- Coordinates: 57.00532°N 2.28974°W
- Culture: Picto-Scottish

Designations

Scheduled monument
- Official name: Nether Auquhollie
- Type: Crosses and carved stones: inscribed stone
- Designated: 17 September 1936
- Reference no.: SM983

The Lang Stane of Auquhollie is an Ogam-inscribed standing stone some 6 kilometres north-west of Stonehaven in Scotland. Situated on south side of Meikle Carew Hill at a height of about 140 metres above sea level, the stone is approximately 3 metres in height and 0.75 metres in diameter, an unshaped monolith of gneiss.

== References and further reading ==
- Allen & Anderson
- Broun, Dauvit (2005), "Alba: Pictish homeland or Irish offshoot?", in O'Neill, Pamela (ed.), Exile and Homecoming. Papers from the Fifth Australian Conference of Celtic Studies, University of Sydney, July 2004, Sydney Series in Celtic Studies, vol. 8, Sydney: The Celtic Studies Foundation, University of Sydney, pp. 234–275, ISBN 1-86487-742-1
- CISP
- Diack, Francis C. (1924–1925), "The Old-Celtic Inscribed and Sculptured Stone at Auquhollie, Kincardineshire, and Ogam in Scotland." (PDF), Proceedings of the Society of Antiquaries of Scotland, 59: 257–269, doi:10.9750/PSAS.059.257.269
- Forsyth, unpub dissert
- Southesk, Earl of (1885), "The Oghams on the Brodie and Aquhollie Stones" (PDF), Proceedings of the Society of Antiquaries of Scotland, 20: 14–40, doi:10.9750/PSAS.020.14.40
- Other PSAS, Henderson, xci:60
- Jürgen Uhlich. "Dov(a)- and Lenited -B- in Ogam", in Ériu 40 (1989): 129–34.
- Eoin MacNeill. "Archaisms in the Ogham Inscriptions", in Proceedings of the Royal Irish Academy, Section C, Vol. 39 (1929–1931): 33–53.
