= George Skene (provost) =

British politician

Provost George Skene
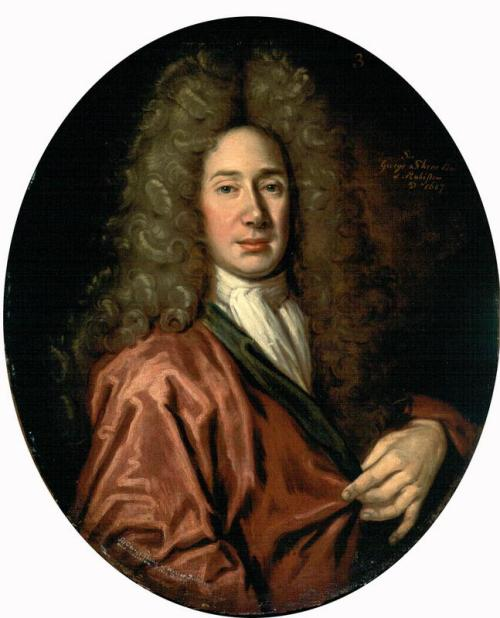
- Sir George Skene of Wester Fintray and Rubislaw, Provost of Aberdeen (1676-85)

Provost of the city of Aberdeen
- In office 1676–1685
- Preceded by: Robert Petrie
- Succeeded by: George Leslie

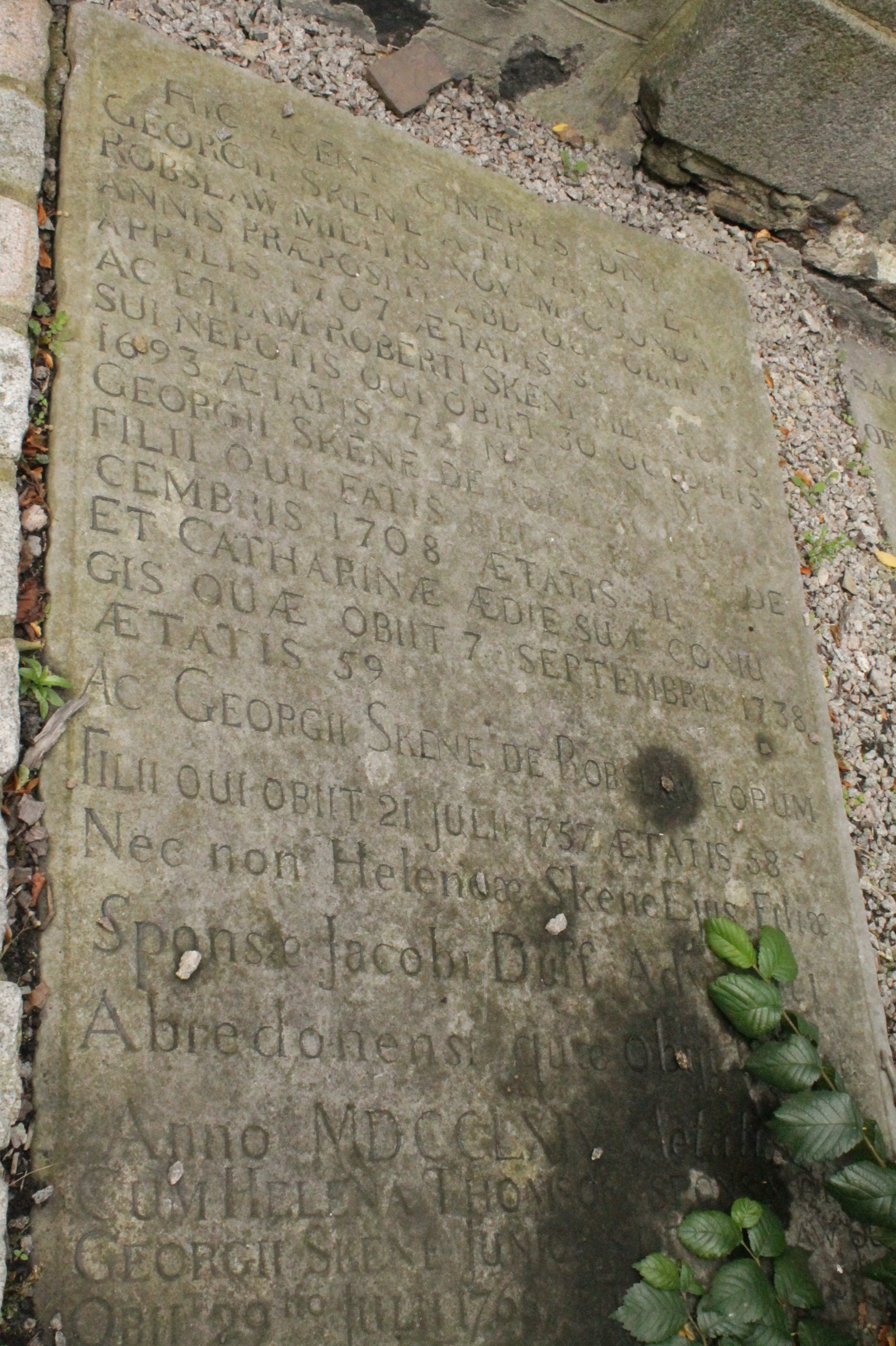
The Skene grave, Kirk of St Nicholas in Aberdeen

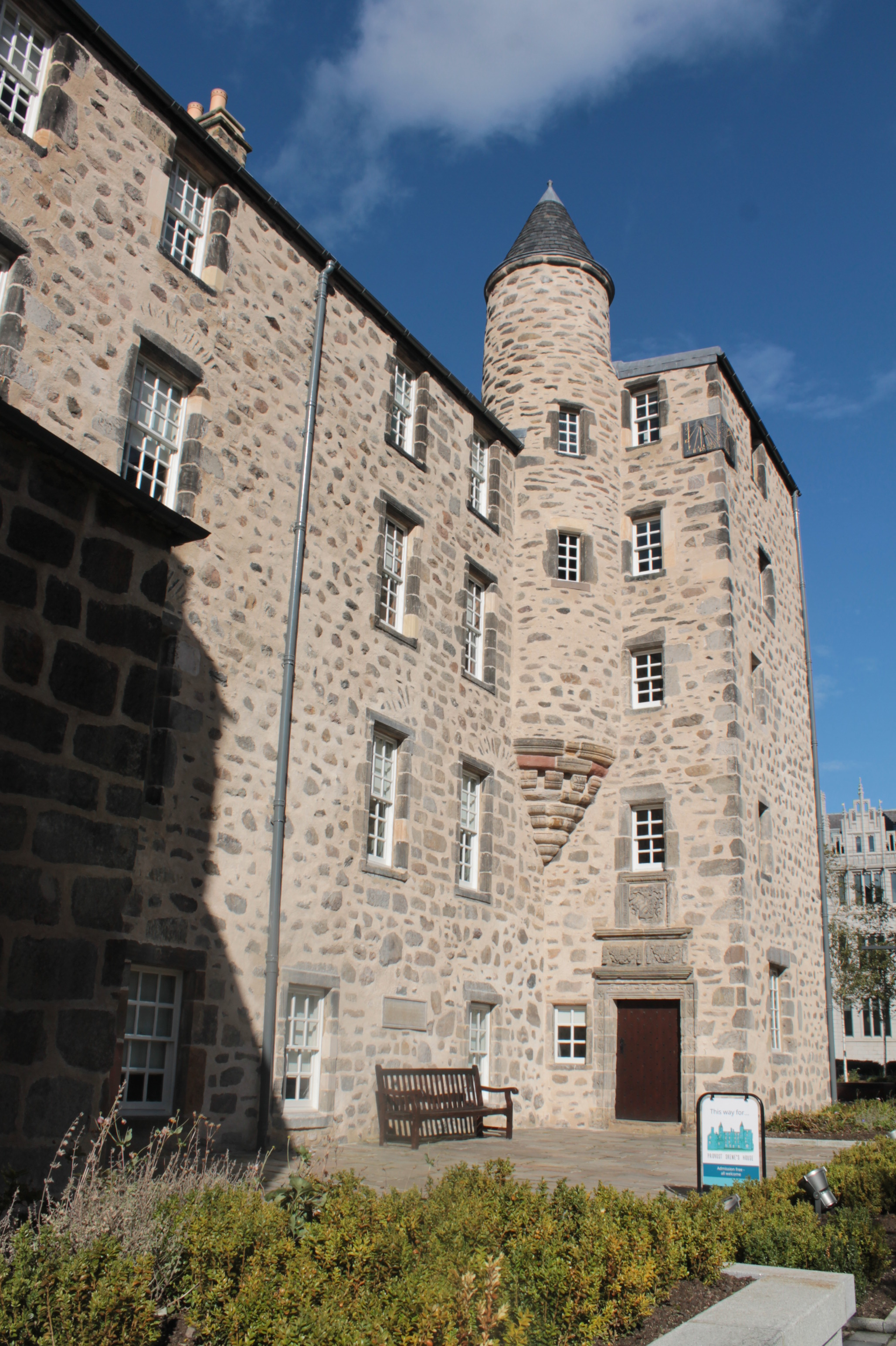
Provost Skene's House, Aberdeen

Sir George Skene of Fintray (1619–1708) was a Scottish merchant in the Baltic trade who served as Provost of the city of Aberdeen from 1676 to 1685. He was knighted in 1681.

He was a burgh commissioner for Aberdeen in the Parliament of Scotland from 1681 to 1682 and 1685 to 1686.

On his death in December 1708 he was buried in the family plot at the Kirk of St Nicholas. The flat stone lies close to the west boundary wall around midway on its length.

Today he is most famous and widely known, not for his time as provost, but for the house he bought in Aberdeen in 1669. Provost Skene's House, built in 1545, is now a biographical museum.

Civic offices
Preceded by Robert Petrie	Lord Provost of Aberdeen; 1676–1685	Succeeded by George Leslie
