= Media in Dundee =

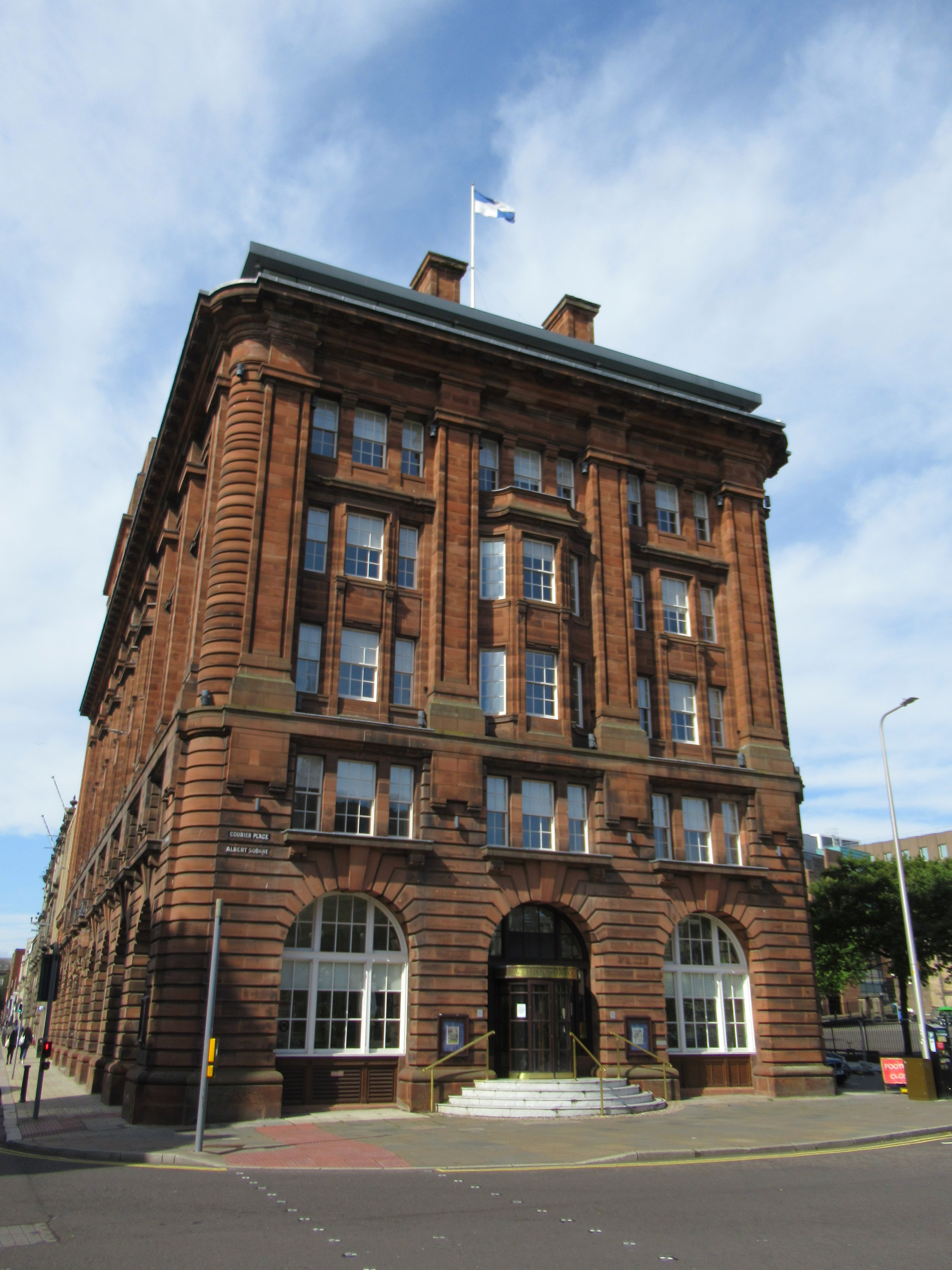
DC Thomson are based in Dundee and produce newspapers, magazines and comics.

Media in Dundee has been an integral part of the city's history, particularly print media. Dundee has long been known for its "Jute, Jam & Journalism," with journalism being the only one of the three industries still prominent in the city.

Dundee is home to a variety of print, radio, television, and digital media outlets, including traditional newspapers, regional radio stations, television news production facilities, and a growing presence in social media and online content creation.

== Print ==
The main newspapers serving Dundee are The Courier (daily) and the Evening Telegraph, published six days a week, by DC Thomson. The city is also home to one of Scotland’s most popular Sunday papers, The Sunday Post.

Dundee has a strong history in magazine and comic publishing, with DC Thomson producing titles such as The People’s Friend, My Weekly, and children's comics including The Beano and The Dandy . Formerly, The Dandy was one of the longest-running comics in the world until its print edition ceased in 2012. The Beano has since taken over as the longest-running children's magazine in the world and the best-selling comic magazine outside Japan.

== Television ==
Dundee has long played a role in regional television broadcasting. For over forty years, Grampian Television operated a base in the city for newsgathering and advertising sales. Since 2007, STV North has produced a nightly regional opt-out bulletin for Tayside and north east Fife as part of STV News at Six. The bulletin was originally broadcast from studios in Harbour Chambers before moving to expanded facilities at Seabraes in 2008.

BBC Scotland also has a presence in Dundee’s city centre, with BBC Dundee primarily focused on newsgathering for television and radio broadcasts.

Dundee briefly had its own restricted service licence television station, Channel Six Dundee, which operated in the early 2000s.

== Radio ==
Dundee is home to several radio stations. Radio Tay operates two commercial stations: Tay FM and Greatest Hits Radio Tayside & Fife. BBC Scotland also has a base in the city for BBC Radio Scotland.

The city’s proximity to the Central Belt means it also receives broadcasts from stations such as Heart Scotland, Capital FM Scotland, Original 106, and Forth 1.

The city previously also had Wave FM, formerly Wave 102, which was taken over by DC Thomson in 2018 but closed in 2020 before being succeeded by Pure Radio Scotland, which in itself ceased operations in 2023 due to poor viewing figures. The wavelength was amalgamated into Original 106.

== Social media ==
Since the early 21st century, Dundee has seen a rise in digital media and social media-based content creation. Independent online platforms and social media brands have grown in influence in Dundee's media landscape, promoting local culture, events, and news, one such being Dundee Culture, a digital platform which launched in 2013. The platform has gained a significant following and engages audiences through social media and multimedia content.

In addition to local social media brands, Dundee has become a hub for digital innovation, with content creators, gaming companies, and creative agencies producing online media that reaches a global audience.
