= Ann Davison =

Ann Davison may refer to:

- Ann Davison (sailor) (1913–1992), author and sailor
- Ann Davison (politician), American attorney and politician

== See also ==
- Anne Davidson, Scottish sculptor and artist
