= 105.4 FM =

FM radio frequency

This is a list of radio stations that broadcast on FM frequency 105.4 MHz:

== China ==
CNR The Voice of China in Dandong and Loudi (urban area, during 05:00-24:00)

== United Kingdom ==
- BFBS Gurkha Radio in Shorncliffe
- Capital Midlands in Leicestershire
- Heart North West
- Heart South Wales in Cardiff
- Magic Radio in London
- Original 106 in St Andrews
