= Mackie's =

Scottish ice cream and confectionery manufacturer

Mackie's Limited
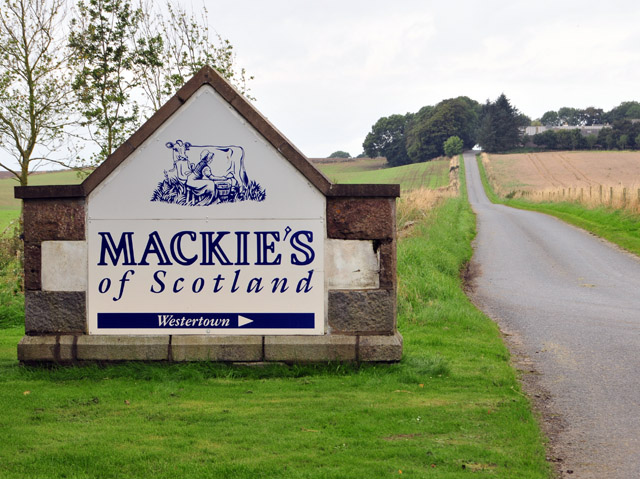
- Entrance to Mackie's farm in Westertown
- Trade name: Mackie's of Scotland
- Formerly: Mackies Aberdeen Dairy Company Limited (1954–1995)
- Type: Private
- Industry: Ice Cream; Confectionery
- Headquarters: Rothienorman, Aberdeenshire, Scotland, UK
- Revenue: ▲£24.8 million (2025)
- Operating income: ▲£2.31 million

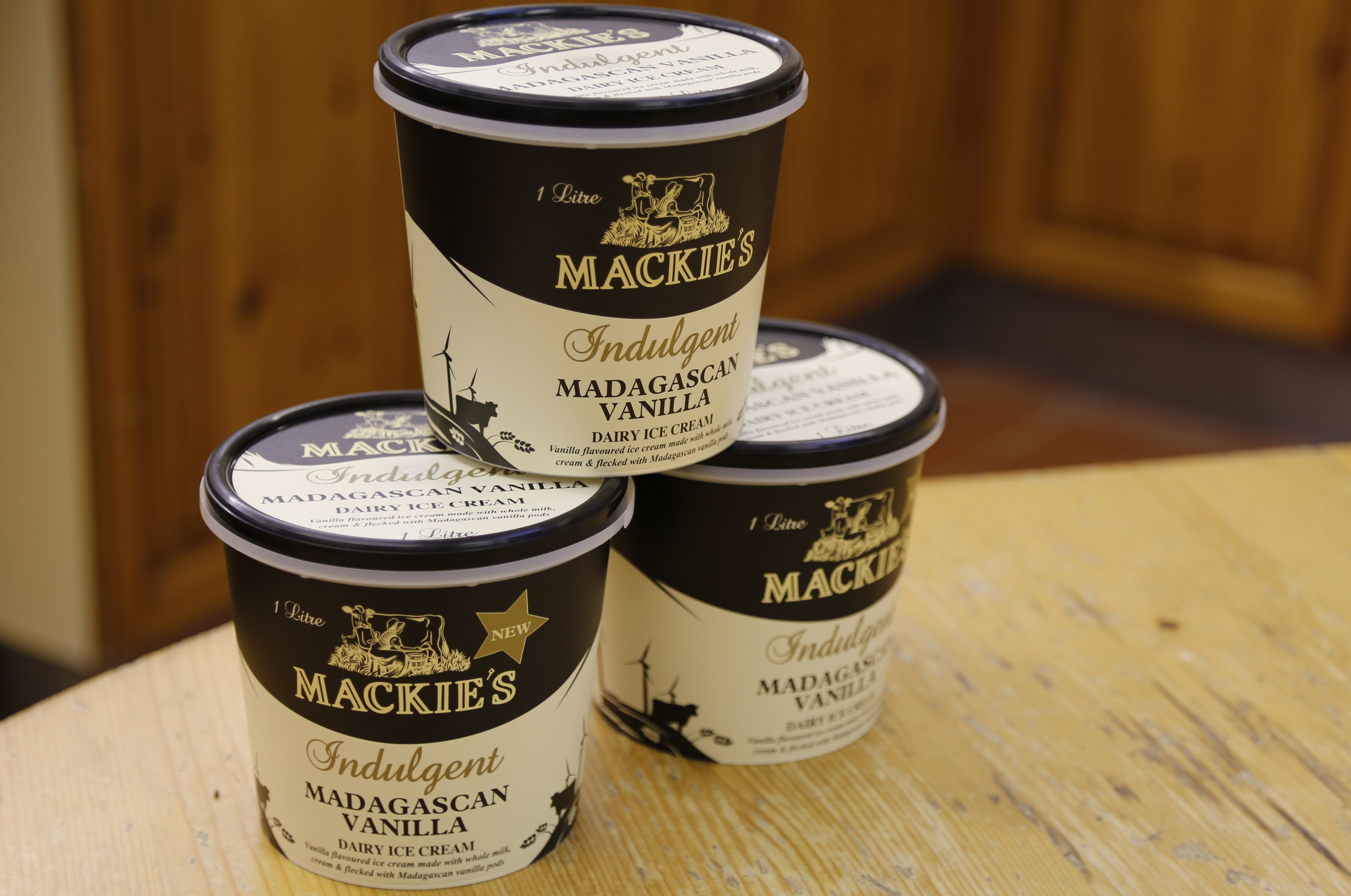
Vanilla ice cream by Mackie's

Mackie's Limited, trading as Mackie's of Scotland, is a Scottish ice cream and confectionery manufacturer based in Rothienorman, Aberdeenshire, Scotland. It was founded in 1912 as a dairy farm but diversified into the manufacture of ice cream in 1986, then sold the milk retail business to Robert Wiseman in 1997.

In 2009 a partnership was formed with a Tayside potato farming family, the Taylors, to produce potato crisps, marketed under the name of Mackie's at Taypack. In 2022, the Taylor family purchased Mackie's shares in the crisp business. The manufacture of chocolate on the Mackie farm in Aberdeenshire began in 2014.

== Ice cream ==
Mackie's of Scotland makes all of its ice cream on the family farm in Aberdeenshire using fresh, whole milk and cream, and other ingredients. The farm holds 330 cows and produces over 10 million litres of ice cream a year. A range of flavours are available in the Classic range, including: Traditional, Honeycomb, Chocolate, Organic and Raspberry Ripple. In the Indulgent range are: Salted Caramel, Madagascan Vanilla and Chocolate Orange & Honeycomb. Mackie's first began ice cream production in 1986.

Mackie's of Scotland is best known for its Traditional flavour (plain, as distinct from vanilla) ice cream, which is Scotland's best-selling ice cream.

Reviews on Trustpilot have been mixed, many reporting in 2024 and later that the ice cream used to be excellent, but had deteriorated, with mention of gums and emulsifiers being added. Ingredients of Mackie's Traditional ice cream as of 2026 are listed as "Whole milk (60%), whipping cream (21%), sugar, milk solids, glycerine, emulsifier (mono- and diglycerides of fatty acids), stabilisers (sodium alginate and guar gum) – no artificial ingredients"; ingredients were the same, plus egg, in 2021.

== Chocolate ==
Mackie's of Scotland has been manufacturing chocolate on the farm since 2014, producing five flavours inspired by the flavours of its ice cream range: Traditional, Honeycomb, Orange, Dark and Mint.

== Renewable energy initiatives ==
Mackie's of Scotland was an early adopter of renewable energy, installing its first 850kW turbine in 2005, having first trialled the idea with a smaller grid-connected turbine as far back as 1983. The firm produces more than twice as much energy as it uses, feeding the excess energy back to the UK grid. The farm's main source of renewable energy is wind, with four wind turbines and a total capacity of 3 MW. Annually, the wind turbines generate 8570 MWh on average, which is roughly equivalent to the amount of energy required to power over 2000 UK homes.

The farm has a 10-acre site of solar panels with a capacity of 1.8 MW, a smaller array of solar panels on the byre roof and a biomass plant which produces a further 400 kW of heating power for the farm's office and houses. The solar panels help to complement the wind energy harvested by the farm, particularly in the sunnier summer months of the year when it is less windy.

Between 2021 and 2022, Mackie's of Scotland installed a low-carbon refrigeration system which uses the heat from a biomass boiler to be help freeze the ice cream made on site. The new system will use biomass energy and ammonia, a natural refrigerant gas with no climate warming threat to cool the ice cream.

== Ice cream parlour ==
In 2017, the company opened its first ice cream parlour, Mackies 19.2, in Marischal Square, Aberdeen. The parlour is named for being located 19.2 miles from the family farm.
