= Aberdeen Town House =

Municipal Building in Aberdeen, Scotland

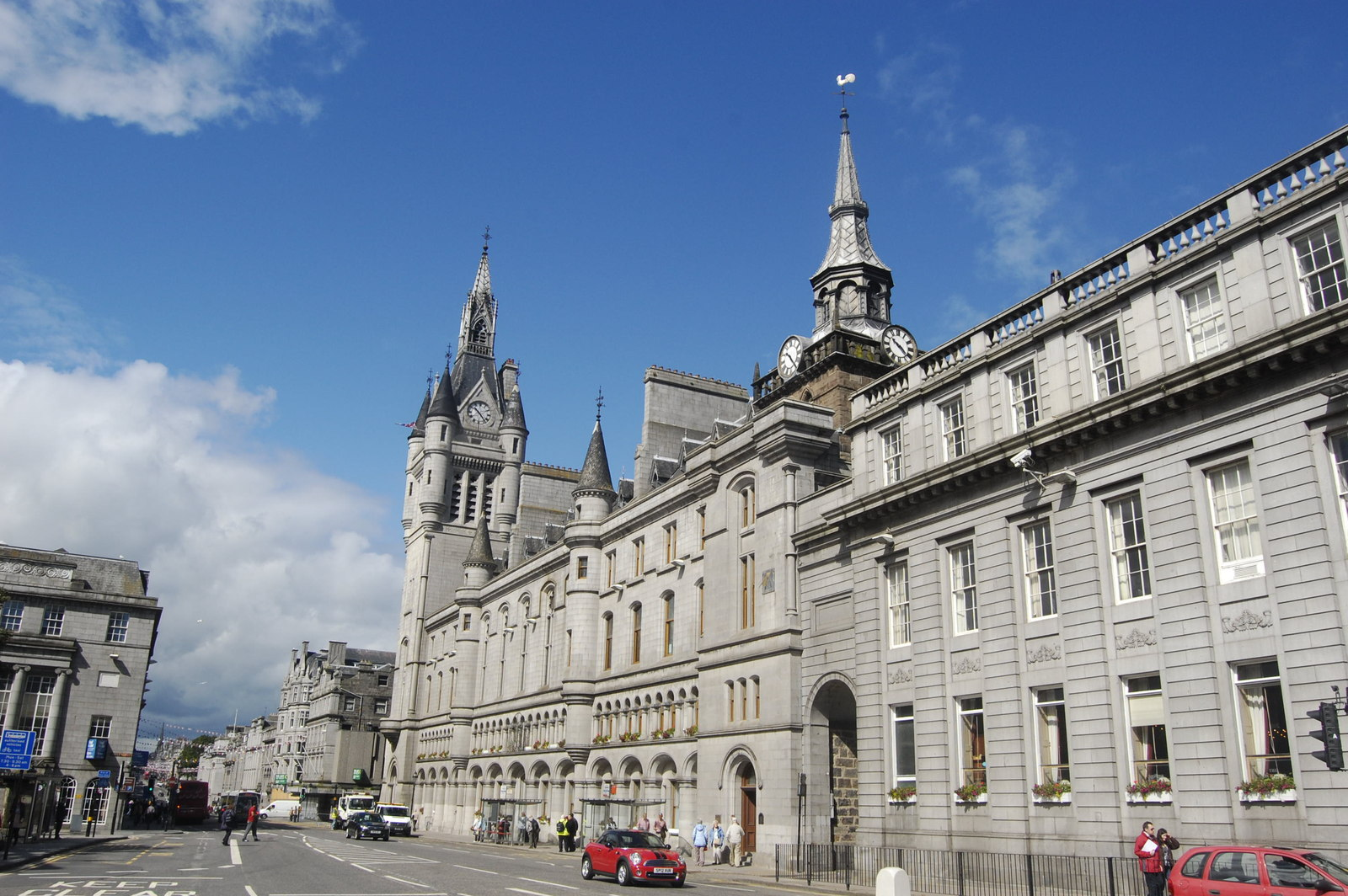
- Aberdeen Town House

- Shown in Aberdeen
- 57.1481°N 2.0944°W
- Location: Aberdeen

History
- Built: 1874

Site notes
- Architect(s): Peddie and Kinnear
- Architectural style: Scottish baronial style

Listed Building – Category A
- Designated: 12 January 1967
- Reference no.: LB19990

Aberdeen Town House is a municipal facility in Castle Street, Aberdeen, Scotland. The town house, which is the headquarters of Aberdeen City Council as well as the venue for hearings of Aberdeen Sheriff Court, is a Category A listed building.

== History ==
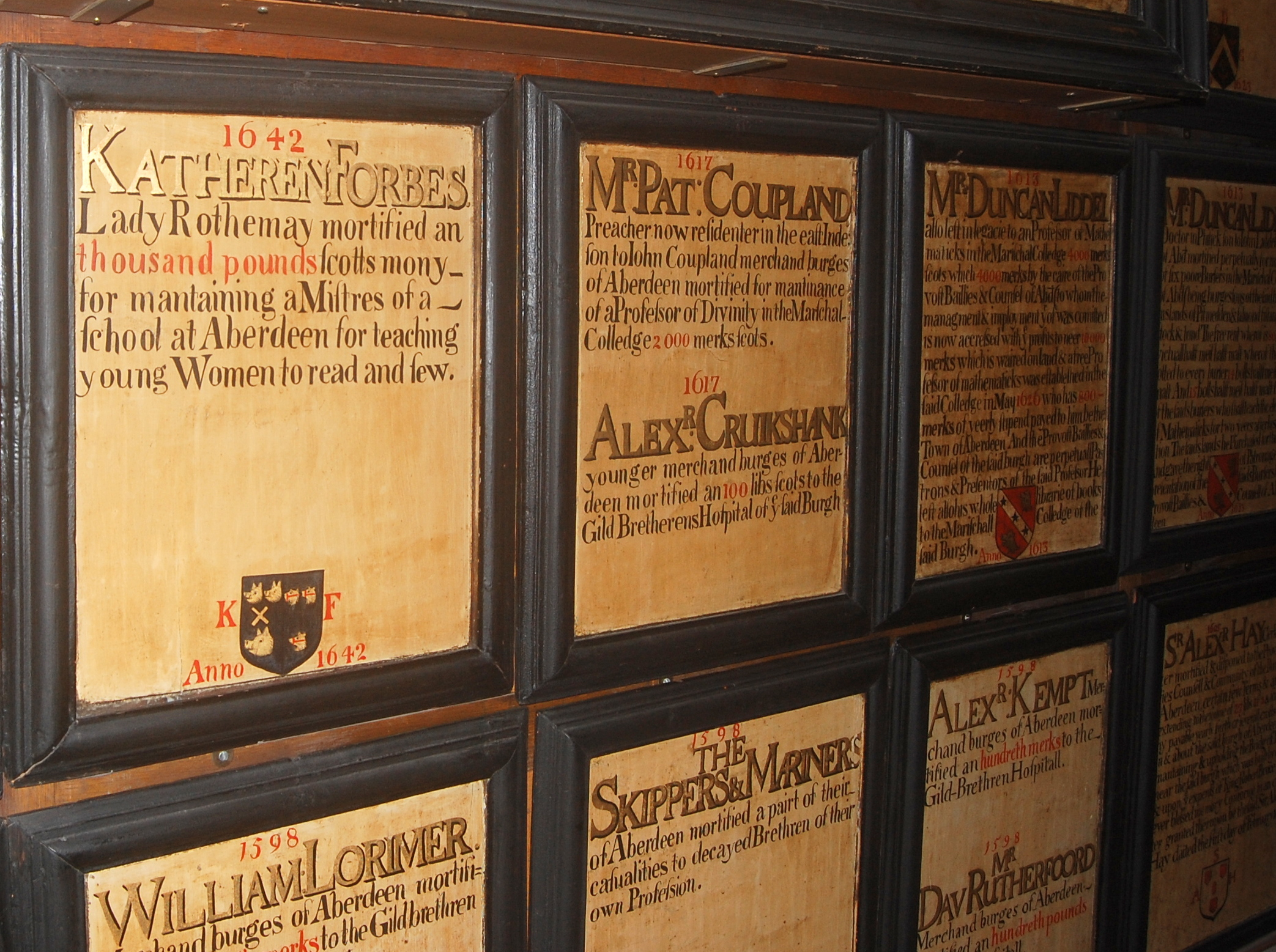
Mortification boards inside the town house, detailing names of benefactors.

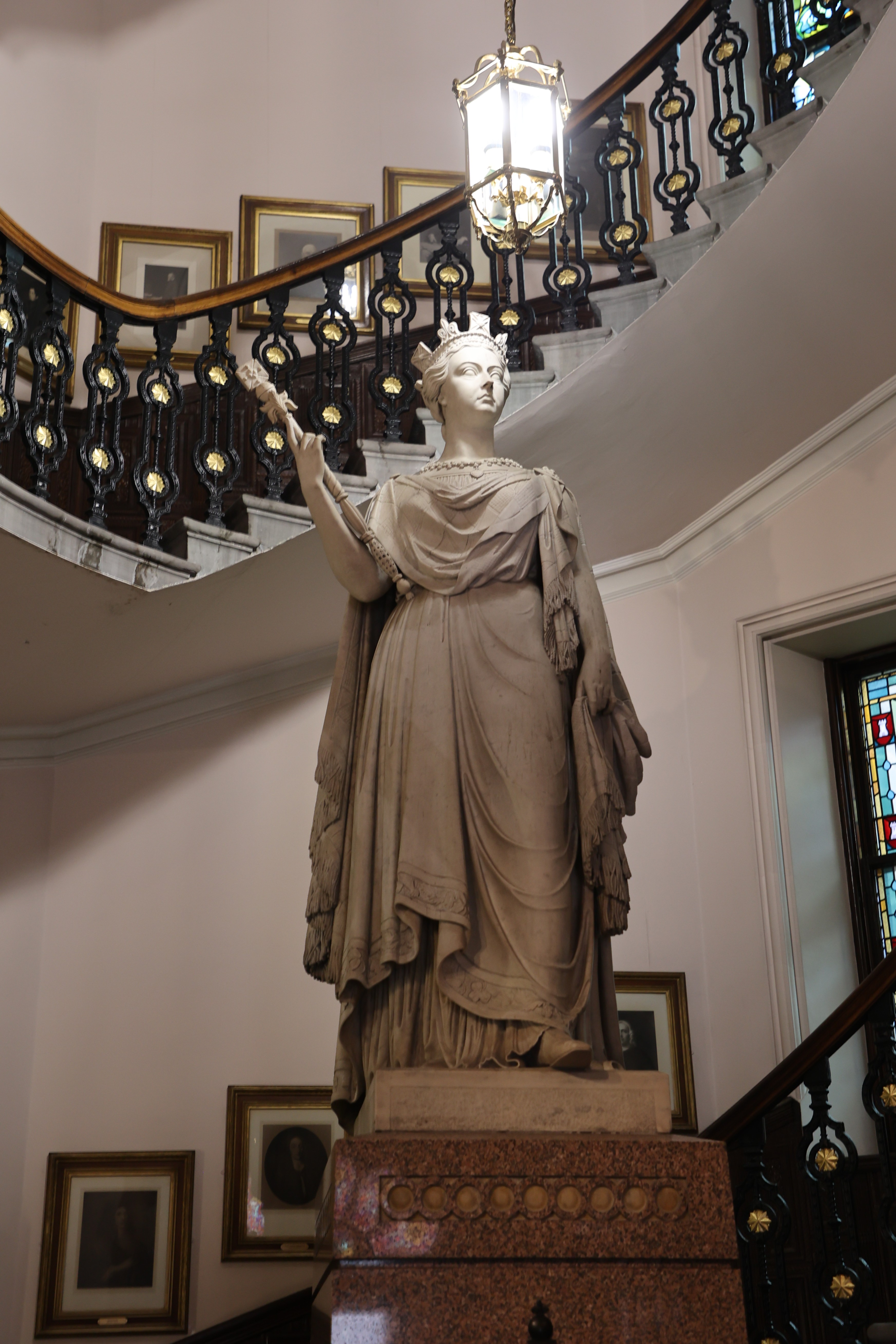
Statue of Queen Victoria, At the bottom of the stairs in Aberdeen Town House

After rapid population growth in the first half of the 19th century, civic leaders decided that the early 17th-century tolbooth and the early 19th-century courthouse, which had been built adjacent to the tolbooth, were inadequate for their needs. They decided to demolish the old courthouse and to incorporate the remaining part of the tolbooth into a new structure.

The new building was designed by Peddie and Kinnear in the Scottish baronial style and was completed in 1874. The design involved an asymmetrical frontage with fifteen bays along Castle Street; the central section of five bays featured segmental-arched arcading on the ground floor and double-height segmental-arched windows on the second and third floors; the western section incorporated a five-stage clock tower with a spire while the eastern section incorporated the southern elevation of the old tolbooth. Internally, the principal room was the double-height council chamber. The new town house served as the headquarters of Aberdeen Town Council until 1895, when that body was replaced by Aberdeen Corporation.

King Edward VII and Queen Alexandra inspected a Guard of Honour from the 3rd Battalion of the Gordon Highlanders in front of the new town house on 27 September 1906.

The building remained the Corporation's headquarters until it was replaced by Aberdeen District Council under the wider Grampian Regional Council in May 1975. The foundation stone for an extension along Broad Street was laid by the Lord Provost, Robert Lennox, on 17 November 1975. The extension which was designed by the city architects, I. A. Ferguson and T. C. Watson, was built by Taylor Woodrow Construction. The complex then remained the Aberdeen District Council headquarters until the abolition of the Grampian Region led to the formation of Aberdeen City Council in April 1996. Since then it has served as the headquarters of Aberdeen City Council and also remained the venue for hearings of Aberdeen Sheriff Court.

The whole complex was extensively refurbished at a cost of £4 million between August 2014 and March 2017.

Works of art in the complex include a sculpture of Robert the Bruce by Anne Davidson showing the Scottish king in 14th-century armour carrying his shield and sword. There is also a marble statue of Queen Victoria, designed by Alexander Brodie, which was moved into the Town House in 1888 from the corner of St. Nicholas Street.

== Clock ==
The clock was built by Gillett, Bland and Company in 1870. It was originally in St. Nicholas Kirk and moved to the Town House in 1887.

== See also ==
- List of listed buildings in Aberdeen/4
