= Broad Street, Aberdeen =

Street in Aberdeen, Scotland, United Kingdom

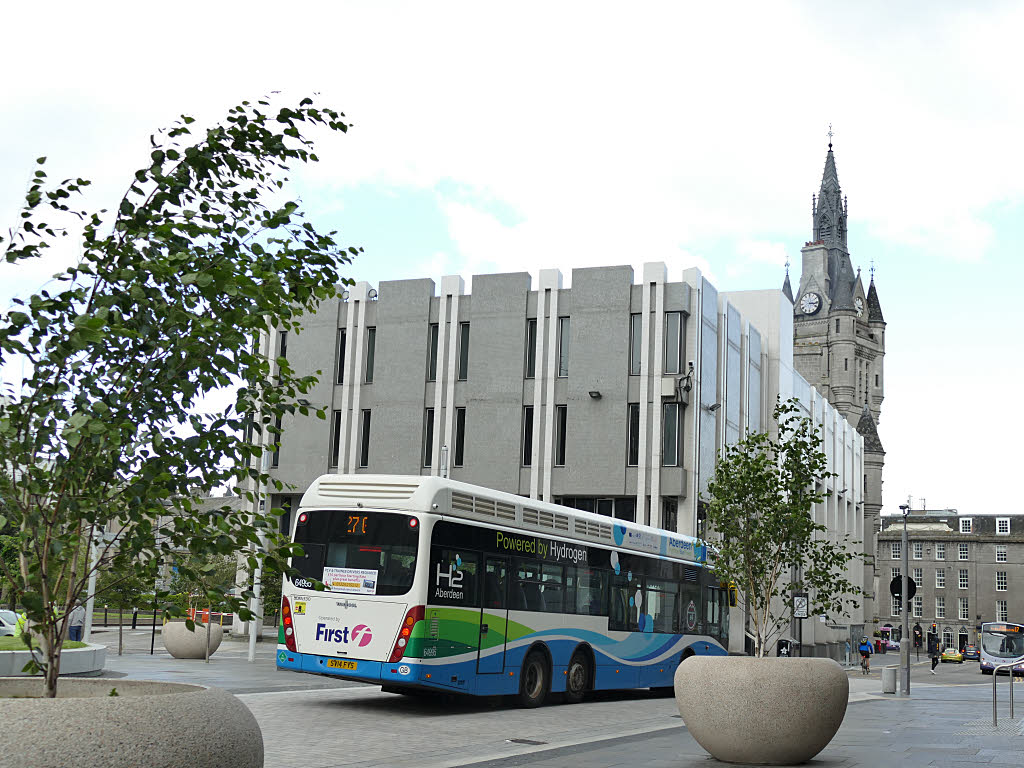
A bus on the street in 2019

Broad Street is a street in Aberdeen which joins Union Street in the southeast and the Gallowgate and Upperkirkgate in the northwest.

== History ==
Pedestrianisation of Broad Street was discussed in 2013, at which time a completion date of 2016 was predicted.

Pedestrianisation was approved in October 2016. Work to partly pedestrianise the street began in May 2017. It remains accessible to buses and cyclists in a shared space format. There has since been proposals to ban buses from the street.

== Buildings ==
On one side of the street is the Marischal Square development. On the other side is the Aberdeen Town House and Marischal College.

== Events ==
During winter months the street is closed for the Aberdeen Christmas Market.
