= List of listed buildings in Aberdeen/4 =

This is a list of listed buildings in Aberdeen, Scotland.

== List ==
Name	Location	Date listed	Grid ref. (Note: Sometimes known as OSGB36, the grid reference (where provided) is based on the British national grid reference system used by the Ordnance Survey. • "Guide to National Grid". Ordnance Survey. • "Get-a-map". Ordnance Survey.)	Geo-coordinates	Notes	LB number (Note: Historic Environment Scotland assign a unique alphanumeric identifier to each designated site in Scotland, for listed buildings this always begins with "LB", for example "LB12345".)	Image
Nigg Kirk Road, Nigg Parish Church (C. Of S.) Including Graveyard, Gatepiers And Boundary Walls				57°07′09″N 2°05′24″W	Category B	19945	Upload Photo
Queen's Cross At Fountainhall Road And Queen's Gardens, Rubislaw Parish Church And Church Hall				57°08′36″N 2°07′39″W	Category B	19947	Upload Photo
St. Mary's Church (C. Of S.) King Street				57°09′51″N 2°05′47″W	Category B	19963	Upload another image
Union Street, 9 Back Wynd, Schoolhill And Correction Wynd, St Nicholas Churchyard, Including Boundary Walls And Gatepiers				57°08′47″N 2°05′58″W	Category A	19967	Upload another image See more images
Allenvale Road, Allenvale Cemetery, Including Lodge And James Saint Monument				57°07′51″N 2°06′38″W	Category B	46473	Upload another image
1 Fonthill Terrace, Whinhill House, Including Gates, Gatepiers And Boundary Walls				57°08′08″N 2°06′29″W	Category B	46476	Upload Photo
60 And 62 Albury Road, Including Boundary Walls				57°08′17″N 2°06′34″W	Category C(S)	46770	Upload Photo
Duthie Park, East Lodge, Gates, Gatepiers And Boundary Walls				57°07′56″N 2°06′08″W	Category B	46779	Upload another image
North Esplanade West, Proserv (Ns) Ltd., Former Caretakers House, Aberdeen Mineral Water Co				57°08′20″N 2°05′42″W	Category C(S)	46795	Upload Photo
6-8 (Even Numbers) Polmuir Road, Including Boundary Walls And Railings				57°08′10″N 2°06′17″W	Category C(S)	46798	Upload Photo
1, 3 And 3A Beechgrove Terrace And 2 Westfield Road, Including Boundary Walls				57°08′57″N 2°07′25″W	Category C(S)	47452	Upload Photo
44 And 46 Fountainhall Road At Desswood Place, Including Boundary Walls				57°08′43″N 2°07′40″W	Category C(S)	47479	Upload Photo
20 Hamilton Place, Including Boundary Walls				57°08′54″N 2°07′26″W	Category C(S)	47488	Upload Photo
Skene Street And Esslemont Avenue, Aberdeen Grammar School, Lodge, Bridge Over Denburn, Gates, Gatepiers, Boundary Walls And Railings				57°08′46″N 2°06′51″W	Category B	47494	Upload Photo
514-520 (Even Numbers) Union Street				57°08′35″N 2°06′45″W	Category C(S)	47498	Upload Photo
40 Albyn Place, Including Gatepiers And Boundary Walls				57°08′34″N 2°07′31″W	Category B	47915	Upload Photo
Holburn Street At Alford Lane, Holburn Central Parish Church, Including Church Hall, March Stone (Forming Quoin On W Gable) And Boundary Walls				57°08′32″N 2°06′45″W	Category B	47927	Upload Photo
28-38 (Even Numbers) Holburn Street And 4-14 (Even Numbers) Union Grove, Skene House, Including Boundary Wall And Inset Niche				57°08′32″N 2°06′46″W	Category B	47929	Upload Photo
338 King Street, Merkland South Building (Former King Street Public School) Including Gatepiers, Gates And Railings				57°09′18″N 2°05′39″W	Category C(S)	48284	Upload Photo
Newlands Avenue And South Anderson Drive, Newlands, Including Boundary Walls				57°07′49″N 2°07′42″W	Category C(S)	48518	Upload Photo
'satrosphere', 179 Constitution Street, Former Tramway Depot				57°09′12″N 2°05′05″W	Category B	49309	Upload Photo
60 Frederick Street, Warehouse				57°09′00″N 2°05′30″W	Category B	50945	Upload Photo
107-131 (Odd Nos) Union Street				57°08′47″N 2°05′56″W	Category C(S)	50958	Upload Photo
Greyhope Road, Capstan Jetty				57°08′28″N 2°04′05″W	Category C(S)	51752	Upload Photo
Spital, 15 And 17 Spital				57°09′27″N 2°06′00″W	Category B	51757	Upload another image
Justice Mill Lane, Former Regent Cinema				57°08′30″N 2°06′41″W	Category C(S)	45603	Upload Photo
1 And 3 Rubislaw Den South At Spademill Road, Including Boundary Walls				57°08′33″N 2°08′04″W	Category C(S)	20788	Upload Photo
27 And 27A Rubislaw Den South, Including Boundary Walls				57°08′33″N 2°08′14″W	Category C(S)	20791	Upload Photo
33 And 35 Rubislaw Den South, Including Gatepiers And Boundary Walls				57°08′32″N 2°08′16″W	Category C(S)	20793	Upload Photo
30 Rubislaw Den South, Including Gatepiers And Boundary Walls				57°08′34″N 2°08′19″W	Category B	20806	Upload Photo
54 Rubislaw Den South, Including Ancillary Structure, Gatepiers And Boundary Walls				57°08′33″N 2°08′32″W	Category C(S)	20814	Upload Photo
58 And 58A Rubislaw Den South, Ingleside, Including Gatepiers And Boundary Walls				57°08′33″N 2°08′34″W	Category B	20816	Upload Photo
33 Forest Road At Desswood Place, Including Gatepiers And Boundary Walls				57°08′40″N 2°08′03″W	Category C(S)	20696	Upload Photo
44, 44A And 46 Forest Road, Including Gatepiers And Boundary Walls				57°08′42″N 2°08′09″W	Category C(S)	20705	Upload Photo
19 Queen's Road, Albyn School For Girls, Including Ancillary Structure, Gatepiers And Boundary Walls				57°08′30″N 2°07′53″W	Category B	20717	Upload Photo
33 Queen's Road, Including Gatepiers And Boundary Walls				57°08′28″N 2°08′02″W	Category B	20723	Upload Photo
2 And 4 Queen's Road, Including Gatepiers And Boundary Walls				57°08′34″N 2°07′46″W	Category C(S)	20733	Upload Photo
11 Rubislaw Den North, Braco Lodge, Including Boundary Walls				57°08′40″N 2°08′17″W	Category C(S)	20763	Upload Photo
24 Rubislaw Den North, Including Gatepiers And Boundary Walls				57°08′42″N 2°08′18″W	Category C(S)	20775	Upload Photo
6 Queen's Gate And 2-12 (Even Numbers) And 12A Forest Road, At Queen's Road, Including Railings And Boundary Walls				57°08′32″N 2°08′01″W	Category C(S)	20635	Upload Photo
230 George Street And 34 John Street				57°09′05″N 2°06′09″W	Category B	20649	Upload Photo
Hazlehead Park, K6 Telephone Kiosk				57°08′24″N 2°10′26″W	Category B	20670	Upload Photo
Gilcomston South Church Union Street/Summer Street				57°08′39″N 2°06′32″W	Category B	20676	Upload Photo
244 Market Street And 1 North Esplanade West, Riverside House, Former Tramshed				57°08′27″N 2°05′27″W	Category B	20678	Upload Photo
25 Polmuir Road, Clifton Villa, Including Boundary Walls				57°08′04″N 2°06′11″W	Category C(S)	20615	Upload Photo
Hamilton Place, Whitehill Bowling Green Wall, Including Piers, Railings And Gates				57°08′51″N 2°07′37″W	Category B	20627	Upload Photo
98 Hamilton Place At Fountainhall Road, Including Gatepiers And Boundary Walls				57°08′50″N 2°07′46″W	Category A	20629	Upload another image
37 And 39 Westburn Road, Including Gatepiers And Boundary Walls				57°09′11″N 2°06′52″W	Category C(S)	20597	Upload another image
Wrights' And Coopers' Place (House 4; Old Number 7)				57°09′59″N 2°06′06″W	Category B	20602	Upload Photo
Union Street, 261-263				57°08′39″N 2°06′21″W	Category C(S)	20538	Upload Photo
431 Union Street Including 429, 433, 441, 443 Union Street, Former Capitol Cinema				57°08′35″N 2°06′36″W	Category B	20547	Upload Photo
Union Street, 156				57°08′44″N 2°06′14″W	Category C(S)	20562	Upload Photo
Union Terrace, 19 Savings Bank And 1 Diamond Place				57°08′48″N 2°06′15″W	Category B	20577	Upload Photo
20 And 22 Upperkirkgate				57°08′56″N 2°05′54″W	Category C(S)	20580	Upload Photo
42 Upperkirkgate				57°08′55″N 2°05′56″W	Category C(S)	20582	Upload Photo
St. Machar Drive, 60 Cluny's Port, Old Aberdeen				57°10′01″N 2°06′11″W	Category B	20478	Upload Photo
St. Machar Drive, 70 Old Aberdeen				57°10′01″N 2°06′06″W	Category B	20480	Upload another image
61 Schoolhill, Former James Dun's House				57°08′52″N 2°06′04″W	Category B	20483	Upload Photo
48 And 50 Shiprow (Including Former House Of Provost Ross)				57°08′48″N 2°05′41″W	Category A	20484	Upload another image See more images
Skene Terrace, 44				57°08′50″N 2°06′27″W	Category B	20504	Upload another image
Skene Terrace, 48, 50				57°08′50″N 2°06′29″W	Category B	20506	Upload another image
95, 97 And 99 Union Street				57°08′47″N 2°05′54″W	Category C(S)	20524	Upload Photo
76 Forest Road At King's Gate (Formerly 55 King's Gate), Including Gates, Gatepiers And Boundary Walls				57°08′48″N 2°08′12″W	Category B	20416	Upload Photo
Mackenzie Place, 8 High Street, Old Aberdeen				57°09′55″N 2°06′10″W	Category B	20417	Upload Photo
Mackie Place, 4, 5				57°08′51″N 2°06′47″W	Category B	20419	Upload Photo
Marine Terrace, Boundary Walls And Railings To Communal Garden, Including Former Public Lavatory				57°08′19″N 2°06′05″W	Category B	20422	Upload Photo
11-15 (Odd Nos) Marischal Street				57°08′51″N 2°05′35″W	Category B	20424	Upload Photo
56 Marischal Street				57°08′48″N 2°05′31″W	Category C(S)	20442	Upload Photo
39 And 40 Regent Quay				57°08′48″N 2°05′27″W	Category C(S)	20462	Upload Photo
73, 74 And 75 Regent Quay				57°08′48″N 2°05′17″W	Category C(S)	20467	Upload Photo
Golden Square, 17, 18				57°08′45″N 2°06′21″W	Category B	20328	Upload another image
Grant's Place, 1-3 Old Aberdeen				57°09′58″N 2°06′07″W	Category B	20330	Upload Photo
64, 64A, 66, 66A And 66B Hamilton Place, Including Gatepiers And Boundary Walls				57°08′52″N 2°07′37″W	Category A	20335	Upload another image
68, 68A And 70 Hamilton Place, Including Gatepiers And Boundary Walls				57°08′52″N 2°07′38″W	Category A	20336	Upload another image
82, 82A And 84 Hamilton Place, Including Gatepiers And Boundary Walls				57°08′51″N 2°07′42″W	Category A	20340	Upload another image
High Street, 17, 19 (West Side) Old Aberdeen				57°09′53″N 2°06′08″W	Category B	20348	Upload another image
High Street, 33, (West Side) Old Aberdeen				57°09′55″N 2°06′09″W	Category B	20353	Upload another image
High Street, 67, (West Side) And Thom's Court, Old Aberdeen				57°09′57″N 2°06′08″W	Category C(S)	20359	Upload another image
High Street, 81, Garden Walls And Gate Pillars				57°09′58″N 2°06′08″W	Category B	20361	Upload another image
High Street, 38-48 (Even Nos) (East Side) Row Part Of Block E Of Taylor Building, King's College, Old Aberdeen				57°09′55″N 2°06′07″W	Category B	20368	Upload another image
High Street, 106 (East Side) Old Aberdeen				57°10′01″N 2°06′07″W	Category B	20377	Upload Photo
249 Holburn Street				57°08′13″N 2°06′52″W	Category C(S)	20379	Upload Photo
2-6 (Even Nos) King Street And 7 And 8 Castle Street				57°08′55″N 2°05′35″W	Category B	20394	Upload another image
12 And 14 King Street				57°08′55″N 2°05′36″W	Category C(S)	20395	Upload another image
Don Street, (N.W. Side) Braeside Cottage And Ivy Cottage				57°10′40″N 2°06′00″W	Category B	20303	Upload another image
Douglas Place, 6 Old Aberdeen				57°09′54″N 2°06′10″W	Category B	20309	Upload Photo
261-265 (Odd) George Street				57°09′06″N 2°06′12″W	Category B	20317	Upload Photo
1-5 (Odd Nos) George Street				57°08′54″N 2°05′58″W	Category B	20318	Upload Photo
George Street, 393 Aberdeen Savings Bank				57°09′12″N 2°06′20″W	Category B	20319	Upload Photo
George Street, 593-595				57°09′22″N 2°06′32″W	Category C(S)	20321	Upload Photo
College Bounds, 51 And 51 And 1/2 (West Side) Powis Lodge Old Aberdeen				57°09′50″N 2°06′09″W	Category B	20220	Upload Photo
College Bounds, 20, 22 (East Side) Old Aberdeen				57°09′44″N 2°06′05″W	Category B	20227	Upload Photo
Crown Street, 27, 29 Britannic House				57°08′39″N 2°06′10″W	Category B	20241	Upload Photo
Crown Street, 84, 86, 86 And A Half				57°08′36″N 2°06′09″W	Category B	20250	Upload Photo
Dee Place, 13				57°08′29″N 2°06′09″W	Category B	20255	Upload Photo
Dee Street, 69, 71				57°08′33″N 2°06′10″W	Category B	20263	Upload Photo
Dee Street, 46				57°08′36″N 2°06′14″W	Category C(S)	20266	Upload Photo
Don Street, 27, 29 (West Side) Old Aberdeen				57°10′04″N 2°06′06″W	Category C(S)	20278	Upload Photo
Don Street, 45 (West Side) Old Aberdeen				57°10′06″N 2°06′03″W	Category B	20280	Upload Photo
Don Street, 49 (The Close) Old Aberdeen				57°10′06″N 2°06′02″W	Category B	20281	Upload Photo
Don Street, 65, 67 (West Side) Old Aberdeen				57°10′07″N 2°05′59″W	Category B	20284	Upload Photo
Don Street, 75, 77 (West Side) Old Aberdeen				57°10′08″N 2°05′57″W	Category C(S)	20286	Upload Photo
51 And 52 Castle Street And 1 And 3 Marischal Street				57°08′52″N 2°05′35″W	Category B	20173	Upload another image
Chanonry (West Side) And St Machar Drive, Botany Boundary Wall And Gate Pillars				57°10′04″N 2°06′10″W	Category B	20177	Upload another image
Chanonry, 11 (West Side) Old Aberdeen				57°10′09″N 2°06′15″W	Category B	20188	Upload Photo
Chanonry, 18 Boundary Wall Only				57°10′09″N 2°06′03″W	Category B	20199	Upload Photo
Clark's Lane, 3 Old Aberdeen				57°10′07″N 2°05′55″W	Category B	20205	Upload Photo
22 And 23 Albyn Place, Albyn Hospital, Including Boundary Walls				57°08′34″N 2°07′07″W	Category B	20118	Upload Photo
1-3 (Odd Nos) Bath Street, Royal Hotel				57°08′41″N 2°06′08″W	Category C(S)	20124	Upload Photo
30 Beechgrove Terrace, Mile End House, Including Gatepiers And Boundary Walls				57°08′57″N 2°07′38″W	Category C(S)	20126	Upload Photo
49 And 51 Belmont Street, The Belmont Picturehouse (Former Trades Council Hall)				57°08′50″N 2°06′09″W	Category C(S)	20132	Upload another image
11A-19 Bon Accord Street (Former Livery Stables And Offices), 21-29 Langstane Place And 2-16 Gordon Street				57°08′38″N 2°06′21″W	Category B	20139	Upload Photo
Bon Accord Street, 60, 62				57°08′31″N 2°06′18″W	Category C(S)	20148	Upload Photo
2 Alford Place, Alford Place Church (Former Christ's College Library), Including Wall And Railings				57°08′35″N 2°06′45″W	Category B	20087	Upload Photo
Powis House, (Powis Community Centre) 11 Powis Circle				57°09′51″N 2°06′35″W	Category B	20104	Upload Photo
35 Regent Quay, Custom House				57°08′47″N 2°05′28″W	Category A	19982	Upload another image
27,29,31 King Street, Including Railings				57°08′56″N 2°05′38″W	Category A	19983	Upload another image
Fire Station (North Eastern Fire Brigade Area Headquarters), King Street				57°09′12″N 2°05′39″W	Category B	19985	Upload another image
Castle Street And 2 Broad Street, Town House, Including Municipal Offices, Court Houses And Tolbooth				57°08′53″N 2°05′41″W	Category A	19990	Upload another image See more images
Telephone Exchange 27-35 (Odd Nos) Bon Accord Street				57°08′36″N 2°06′18″W	Category B	19997	Upload Photo
Queen's Cross, Queen Victoria Statue				57°08′35″N 2°07′37″W	Category B	20011	Upload Photo
115-117 (Odd Numbers) Great Western Road, March Stone Number 4				57°08′19″N 2°07′06″W	Category C(S)	20017	Upload Photo
March Stone No. 7, At No. 3 Craigton Road				57°07′54″N 2°08′17″W	Category B	20020	Upload Photo
March Stone No. 47 On North Side Of The Road Leading To Farm Of Westerton Of Auchmill And At The Bend North Of Marchburn Infant School				57°10′14″N 2°10′00″W	Category B	20027	Upload Photo
55 Powis Terrace, March Stone No 57				57°09′36″N 2°06′51″W	Category C(S)	20037	Upload Photo
March Stone No. 58, In Front Garden Wall Of 21 Elmbank Terrace				57°09′29″N 2°06′29″W	Category B	20038	Upload Photo
March Stone No. 64, On South Side Of School Road At Junction With Golf Road				57°09′59″N 2°05′14″W	Category B	20044	Upload Photo
24 Albyn Place, St John's Well				57°08′52″N 2°06′32″W	Category C(S)	20054	Upload Photo
Snow Churchyard College Bounds				57°09′46″N 2°06′09″W	Category B	20064	Upload another image
Brig O' Balgownie Over River Don				57°10′38″N 2°05′55″W	Category A	20067	Upload another image
Duthie Park, Fountainhall Cistern House				57°07′43″N 2°06′15″W	Category C(S)	20080	Upload another image
Carden Place And Albyn Place, Queen's Cross Church (Church Of Scotland), Including Gatepiers And Boundary Walls				57°08′36″N 2°07′30″W	Category A	19948	Upload another image
King Street, St Andrew's Cathedral (Episcopal)				57°08′57″N 2°05′35″W	Category A	19953	Upload another image
15 Back Wynd (Former West St Nicholas Church Parish Rooms)				57°08′51″N 2°06′02″W	Category C(S)	19968	Upload Photo
20 Union Terrace				57°08′48″N 2°06′16″W	Category B	19979	Upload another image
5 York Street, Cam House, (Former Nursery School), Including Boundary Wall And Railings				57°08′47″N 2°04′45″W	Category C(S)	46278	Upload Photo
17 Fonthill Road, Eastbank, Including Gatepiers And Boundary Walls				57°08′13″N 2°06′29″W	Category C(S)	46475	Upload Photo
2-14 (Even Numbers) Fonthill Terrace, Including Gatepiers And Boundary Walls				57°08′09″N 2°06′28″W	Category B	46477	Upload Photo
Duthie Park, Fountain				57°07′47″N 2°06′04″W	Category B	46781	Upload another image
32-36 (Even Numbers) Ferryhill Place, Including Gatepiers And Boundary Walls				57°08′14″N 2°06′14″W	Category B	46788	Upload Photo
64 Fonthill Road And 73-75 (Odd Numbers) Albury Road				57°08′14″N 2°06′34″W	Category C(S)	46790	Upload Photo
82 Beechgrove Terrace, Ernan Lodge, Including Boundary Walls				57°08′53″N 2°07′48″W	Category C(S)	46992	Upload Photo
Mid Stocket Road, Raeden Nursery Walled Garden				57°09′02″N 2°08′35″W	Category C(S)	46995	Upload Photo
172-176 (Inclusive Numbers) And 178 Skene Street At Thistle Lane, Including Boundary Walls				57°08′45″N 2°06′49″W	Category C(S)	47496	Upload Photo
21 Albyn Place, Albyn Hospital, Including Boundary Walls				57°08′34″N 2°07′06″W	Category C(S)	47912	Upload Photo
67 King's Gate, Including Boundary Walls				57°08′47″N 2°08′22″W	Category C(S)	47930	Upload Photo
Broomhill Road At Gray Street, Broomhill Primary School, Including Gates, Gatepiers, Boundary Walls, Railings And Lodge (88 Gray Street)				57°07′55″N 2°07′27″W	Category C(S)	48513	Upload Photo
Union Grove At Holburn Street, 1-18 (Inclusive Numbers) Union Grove Court, Including Gatepiers And Boundary Walls				57°08′30″N 2°06′48″W	Category C(S)	48523	Upload Photo

== Key ==
The scheme for classifying buildings in Scotland is:

- Category A: "buildings of national or international importance, either architectural or historic; or fine, little-altered examples of some particular period, style or building type."
- Category B: "buildings of regional or more than local importance; or major examples of some particular period, style or building type, which may have been altered."
- Category C: "buildings of local importance; lesser examples of any period, style, or building type, as originally constructed or moderately altered; and simple traditional buildings which group well with other listed buildings."

In March 2016 there were 47,288 listed buildings in Scotland. Of these, 8% were Category A, and 50% were Category B, with the remaining 42% being Category C.

== See also ==
- List of listed buildings in Aberdeen
