= The Tolbooth, Aberdeen =

The Tolbooth
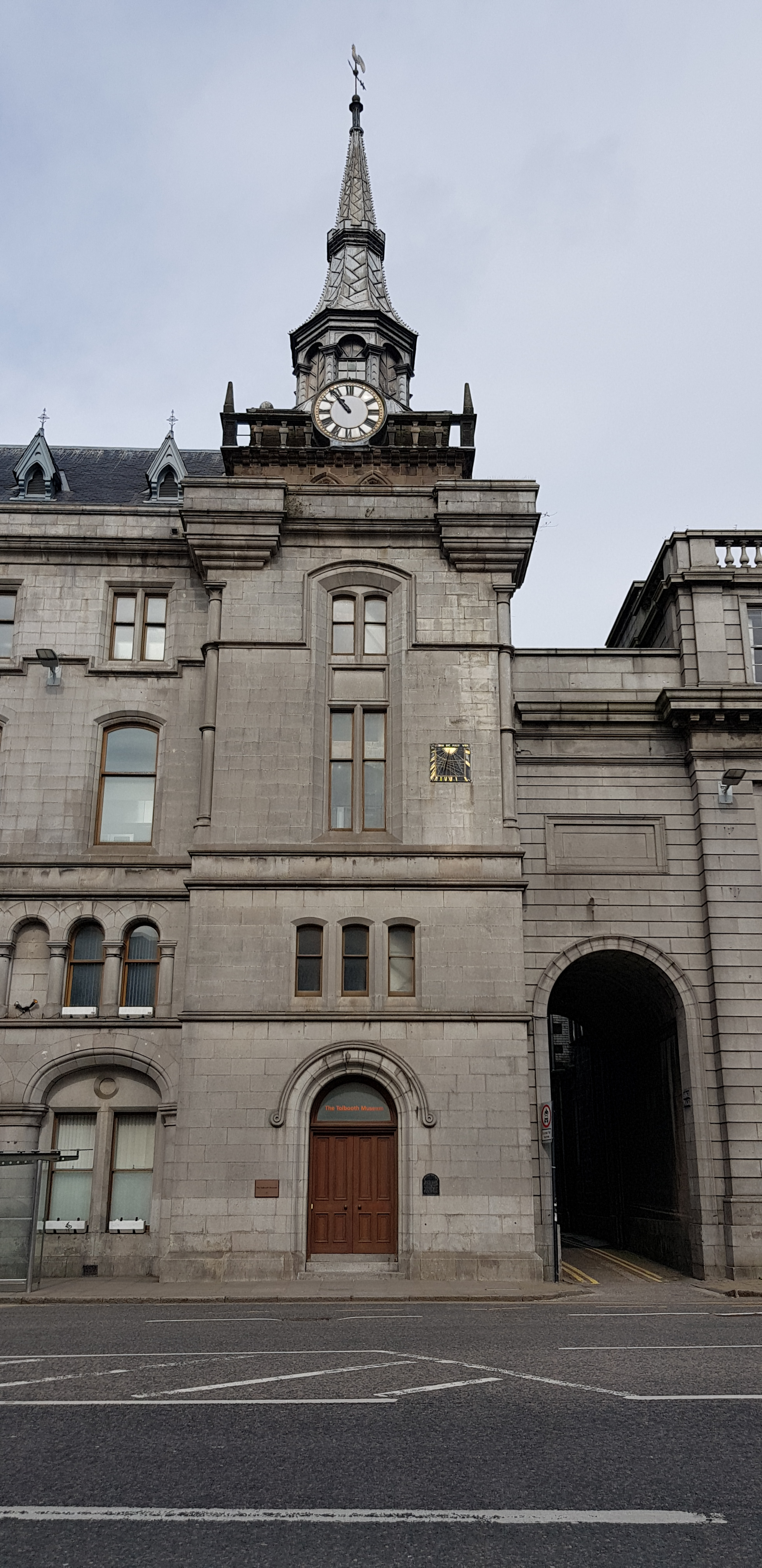

- Location in Aberdeen City council area
- Location: Aberdeen
- Coordinates: 57°08′53″N 2°05′39″W
- Type: Prison Museum
- Website: Museum Website

The Tolbooth in Aberdeen, Scotland is a 17th-century former jail which is now operated as a museum. The museum contains prison cells and exhibits various police and law and order related items. The building has been featured on popular television as the setting for a ghostlore story.

== History ==
Considered one of the oldest buildings in Aberdeen, the tolbooth was built between 1616 and 1629 and is attached to Aberdeen Town House on the city centre's Union Street. In the mid-16th century, Aberdeen commissioned its first guillotine for executing criminals there. This device is on display at the museum for the public to view.

In around 1630, Marion Hardie from Elgin was arrested for practicing witchcraft, incarcerated in the tolbooth and then strangled and burnt in front of the public outside the tolbooth. By 1703, witchcraft was no longer a crime, but by then many of the 45 women and 2 men accused of it in the area had been executed.

In 1686, a market cross was built in front of the tolbooth. It was restored in 1821 and then moved to its present site in 1827.

During the Jacobite rising of 1715, many local people announced their support for James Francis Edward Stuart as the true King of Scotland in front of the tolbooth, and after the Jacobite rising of 1745 and subsequent defeat at the Battle of Culloden, the tolbooth accommodated over 96 Jacobite prisoners while they awaited trial.

In the 18th century, Aberdeen merchants and magistrates imprisoned many local children in the tolbooth and other buildings around the city before transporting them to America to work as slaves. These children were supposed to have been street children with nobody looking after them, although some were said to have been snatched when out playing.

== Clock ==
The Tolbooth contained one of the earliest public clocks, built by J. Gartley of Aberdeen in 1816.

== Ghostlore ==
Aberdeen City Council took over the former jail and opened it to the public in 1995. A paranormal investigation team visited the building as part of the Most Haunted TV series in April 2009: the episode aired in December 2009. In 2016, the museum celebrated its 400th anniversary.

== The museum ==
Visitors can see the prison cells with their original barred windows and doors, and the guillotine which was used to execute convicted prisoners. There is a cell known as the Jacobite cell where visitors can experience an interactive model of Willie Baird, a prisoner in 1746, sitting next to his Jacobite compatriots, James Innes and Alexander Annand, and telling visitors about his life, while they await trial and sentencing.
