= Marischal Square =

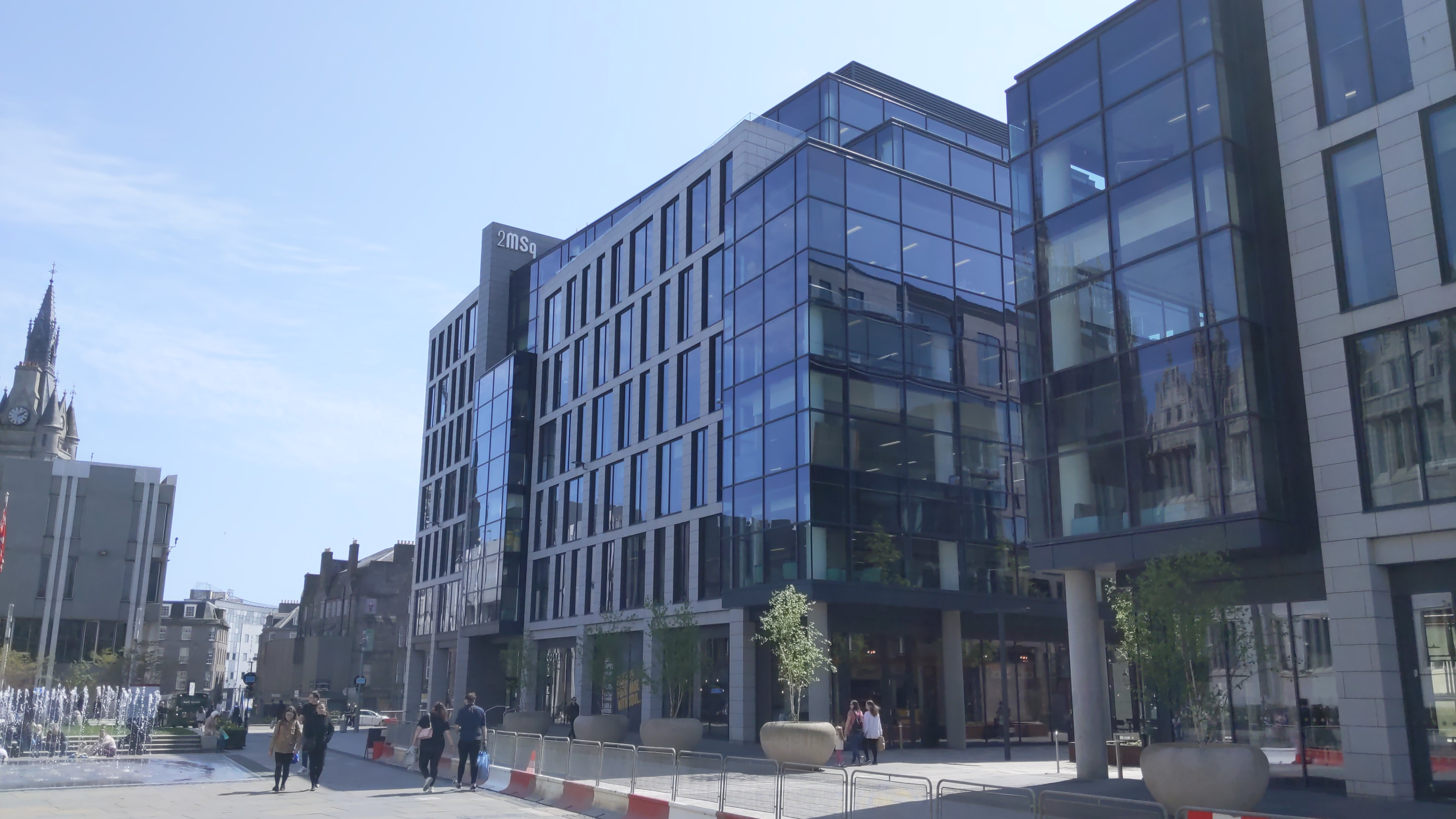
- Interactive map of the Marischal Square area

General information
- Type: Mixed use (offices, hotel, and gastronomy)
- Location: Broad Street, Aberdeen, Aberdeen, Scotland
- Coordinates: 57.148840°N 2.097472°W
- Opened: 5 December 2017
- Cost: £50 million
- Client: Muse Developments
- Landlord: Aberdeen City Council

Technical details
- Floor count: 7
- Floor area: 239,776 sq ft (22,276 m^{2})

Design and construction
- Architecture firm: Halliday Fraser Munro

Marischal Square is a mixed use complex on Broad Street, Aberdeen, Scotland. The development is located on the site of St. Nicholas House, Aberdeen City Council's former 14-storey headquarters building, whose demolition was completed on 18 June 2014, after staff had been relocated to the redeveloped Marischal College across the road.

The premises is bounded by Broad Street to the east, Upperkirkgate to the north, and Flourmill Lane to the west. Comprising 0.981 hectares (2.42 acres), it was developed in a single phase and completed in 2017.

== Structure and tenants ==
The two office buildings, named 1 and 2 Marischal Square respectively, contain ground-floor receptions operated by the landlord. 1 Marischal Square is the larger of the two, with a net floor space of 122,174 sq ft (11,350 sq m) and 164 underground parking spaces. By comparison, 2 Marischal Square has 54,677 sq ft (5,095 sq m) of floor space, and 78 underground parking spaces.

Besides the two office buildings, the site contains the Aberdeen Residence Inn by Marriott hotel. This corners the Provost Skene's House museum, with a large public green space separating the two. In addition, there are a number of gastronomic outlets including All Bar One, Costa Coffee, Mackie's of Scotland and Tony Macaroni.

On 25 June 2019, Aberdeen local radio station Original 106 commenced broadcasting from their new studio complex located at 1 Marischal Square, within the office space of the station's owners DC Thomson, publishers of local newspaper titles The Press and Journal and Evening Express.

=== Former ===
There was formerly a Prezzo restaurant. It closed in 2021.

== History ==
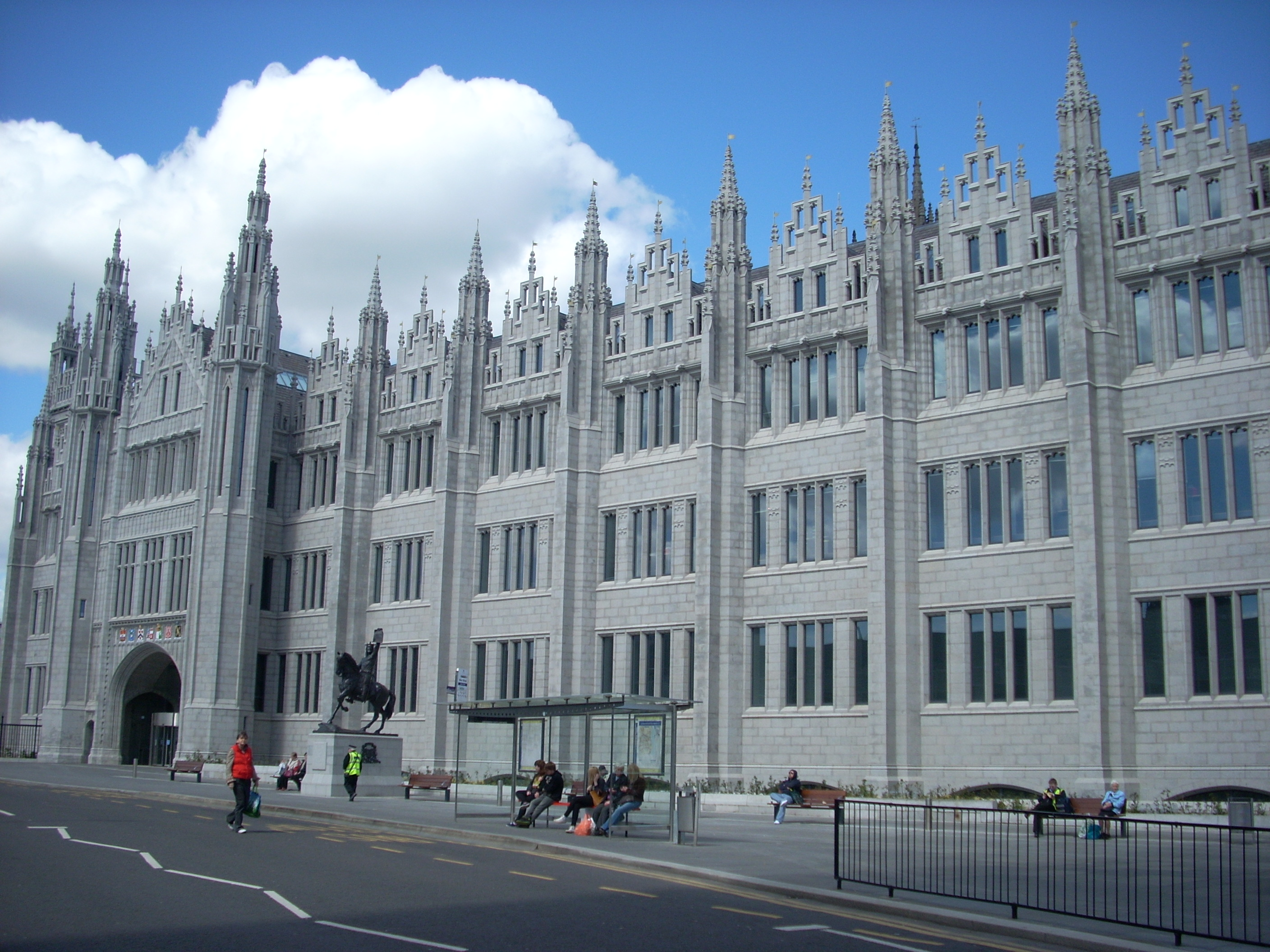
Marischal College

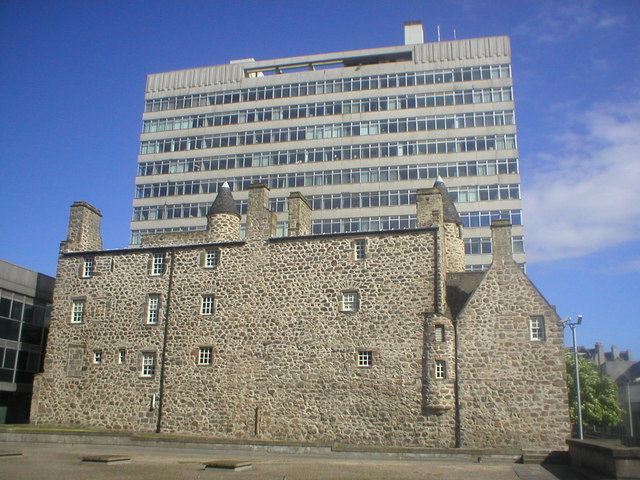
The former St. Nicholas House (Provost Skene's House in the foreground)

The area in which the development is situated had undergone significant changes over the past two decades. At the close of the 2003/04 academic year, the University of Aberdeen removed the Students' Association from its former building on 2-4 Upperkirkgate on the corner of Broad Street. This was in light of the decline in use of Marischal College as a teaching facility for medicine, with only a few areas remaining in use for other purposes.

Public university use of Marischal College finally ceased completely in 2008 in preparation for Aberdeen City Council's renovation and use of the building. This carried implications for the commercial viability of the local area: Despite the presence of the Bon Accord & St Nicholas shopping centre nearby, businesses on the Upperkirkgate were affected by the new absence of university students from the area.

=== Marketing and design competition ===
Aberdeen City Council voted to demolish St. Nicholas House in October 2011. Despite calls to find a public and non-commercial use for the space on part of local SNP councillors, the council chose to market the vacant site on the open market, in recognition of the decline in commercial activity the area had experienced.

A two-stage selection process followed, and in August 2012 it was announced that thirteen offers had been received by the Council from interested developers. All bids were for mixed-use developments comprising hotel, office, retail and restaurant/café use and varied between 180,000sqft to 650,000sqft with parking for 150 to 600 vehicles. In October 2012 four bidders were short-listed to move onto stage two and present more detailed design proposals to the Council.

The short-listed designs were made public in April 2013 and Manchester based Muse Developments in a joint venture with Aviva Investors were selected as the preferred bidder on 1 May 2013. It was estimated by the Council that the development would attract 3000 extra people into Aberdeen city centre daily.

Muse's bid includes provision for the Council to lease the development from Muse for a period of 35 years and receive part of the rental income from the tenants for that period. The development would revert to Council ownership after the 35-year period. The decision by the Council to select the Muse proposal was controversial with voting by Councillors split 23-20. The ruling Labour, Conservative and Independent coalition voted in favour whilst the SNP and Liberal Democrats were opposed.

=== Planning & design ===
The pre-application planning process was completed summer 2013. Public consultation events took place Aberdeen Art Gallery later that year.

Marischal Square would comprise 175,000 sq ft of office space; 5,000 sq ft of restaurant space; and 18,638 sq ft of retail and leisure space which would include a circa 150-bedroom hotel boutique hotel.

Indicative designs show several linked buildings, the highest of which would be 10 storeys from Flourmill Lane. The development would also feature gardens, glass roofed court-yards and the pedestrianisation of Broad Street to create a civic space between the development and Marischal College. Provost Skene's House which dates from the 17th century would be retained as part of the proposals.

=== Opening ===
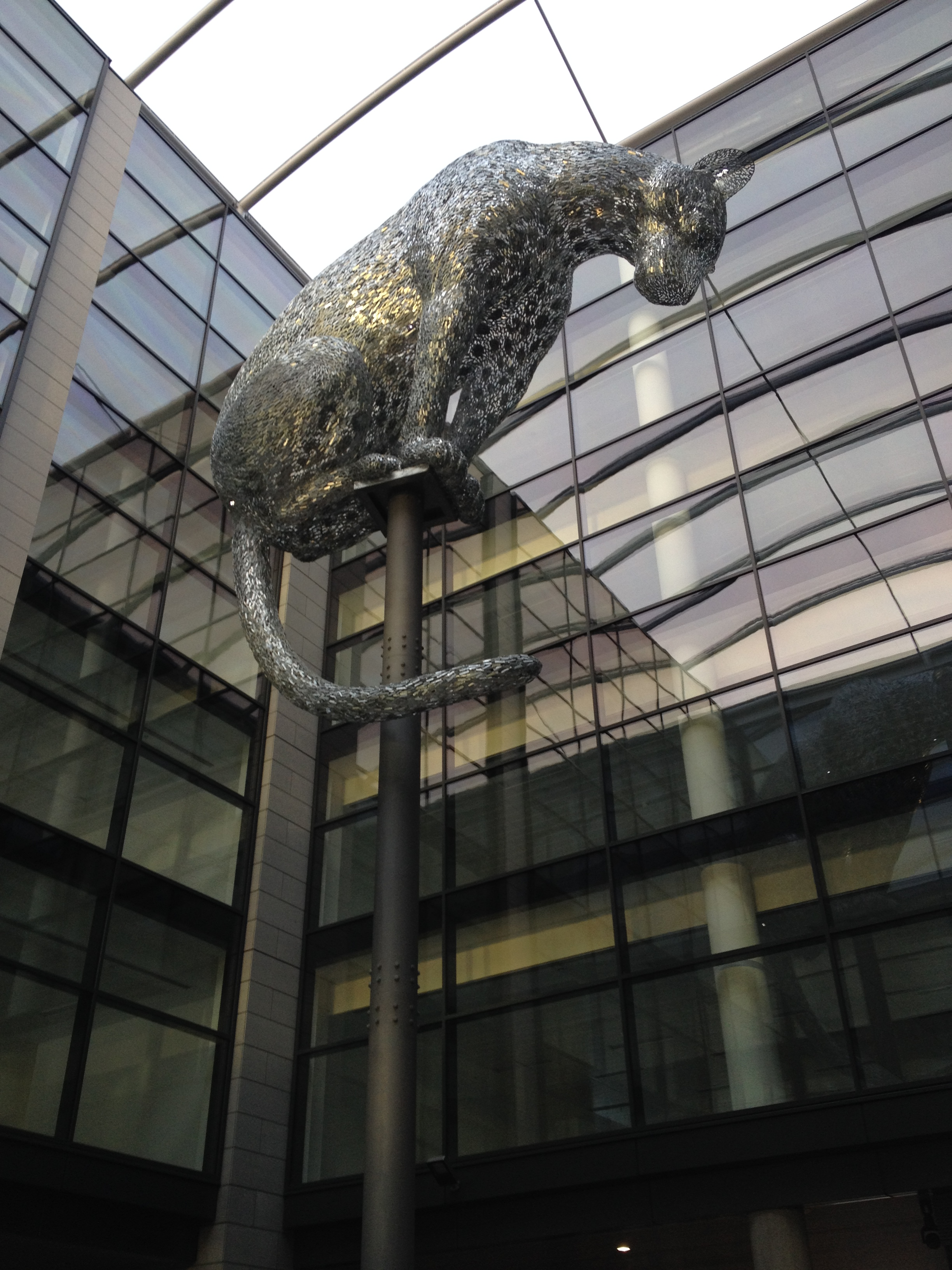
A sculpture of a Leopard, designed by Andy Scott, is featured within the development

The first shop in the square, Mackie's ice cream parlour, opened in December 2017. A steel sculpture of a leopard, designed by Andy Scott, is the central feature of the atrium within the development. Weighing more than two tonnes and five metres high, it is mounted on top of a ten-metre pole. The figure, titled Poised, took more than a year to be completed and is Scott's first sculpture in the north east.

Details of heads of terms with building tenants were released by Aberdeen City Council in March 2021, showing that lease incentives totalling £4.49 million had been granted to tenants.

== Criticism ==
There was opposition to the development, with protestors concerned that it would affect views of Marischal College and Provost Skene's House. In January 2015, several hundred demonstrators formed a human chain around the site in protest. In response, Muse stated that the development would demonstrate "considerable respect to the city's granite tradition as well as the undeniable beauty and artistry of the Marischal College building and the warm public affection for Provost Skene's House".

== Awards ==
The square won both the Project of the Year, and Public Realm & Landscaping awards in the Aberdeen Society of Architects annual design awards in 2018.
