= Wave FM =

Former radio station in Dundee

Coordinates: 56.4581°N 2.9757°W

- Dundee; Scotland
- Broadcast area: Dundee & Perth
- Frequencies: 102 and 106.6 FM

Ownership
- Owner: DC Thomson

History
- First air date: 30 August 1999
- Last air date: 5 July 2020
- Former names: Discovery 102

Wave FM was an Independent Local Radio station broadcasting to the cities of Dundee and Perth in Scotland.

The station broadcast a mixed music format 24 hours a day, 7 days a week and was founded as part of The Petros Radio Group which launched Discovery AM in 1994 and Radio Waves in 1995, followed by the award of a full scale ILR licence with the help of a consortium which also founded Kingdom FM in Fife with the assistance of IRG (The Independent Radio Group).

When the station originally launched it was called Discovery 102, since Dundee is known as the City of Discovery after the RRS Discovery, which is docked there. The brand name was changed to Wave 102 after The Discovery Channel stated that people would mistakenly associate the station with its network.

On 15 May 2008, New Wave Media became the new owners of Wave 102, which was eventually joined by sister stations Original 106 in Aberdeen and Central FM in the Forth Valley.

On 26 October 2016, Ofcom approved an application from Wave 102 and Heartland FM to allow Wave 102 to take over the 106.6FM transmitter covering Perth. On Monday 9 January 2017 the station started to brand itself as 'Dundee and Perth's Wave 102'.

On 1 December 2016, three online-only stations were launched under the Wave 102 brand; Wave 102 Chart (playing non-stop hits), Wave 102 Country (24 hour current and classic country hits) and Wave 102 Gold (non-stop 60's, 70's and 80's hits).

In December 2017, it was announced that Dundee based DC Thomson had acquired the licences to broadcast to Dundee and Perth from New Wave Media.

On 19 March 2018, Wave 102 relaunched as Wave FM at 6am.

Wave FM ceased broadcasting in July 2020 and was replaced by a relay of DC Thomson's central-belt DAB station Pure Radio, with opt-outs for local news and traffic bulletins.

On 12 September 2023, Pure Radio ceased broadcasting, with its FM frequencies in Dundee and Perth subsequently handed over to Original 106.

== Influence ==
Rockstar North, the Dundee-founded game developer of the Grand Theft Auto series, added Scottish and Dundee sound and visual references in the game Grand Theft Auto: Vice City, one being an in-game radio station called Wave 103.
