= Anne Davidson =

Scottish artist (1937–2008)

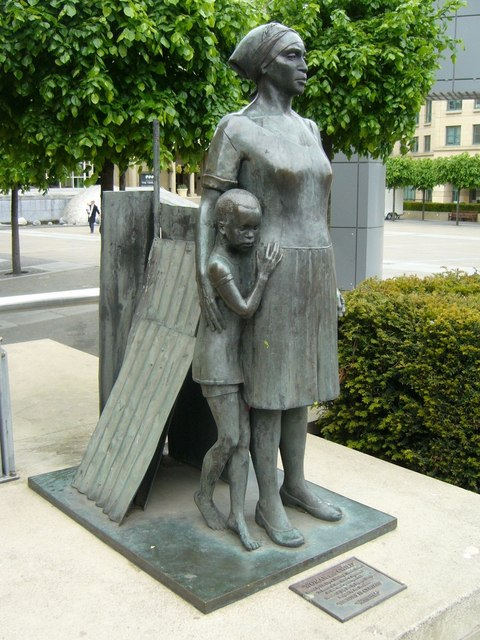
Sculpture of Woman And Child in Edinburgh (1986). The statue celebrated the city's stand against the apartheid system in South Africa at the time of the imprisonment of Nelson Mandela and fighting in Soweto township.

Anne Ross Davidson, DA (3 February 1937 in Glasgow – 20 December 2008 in Aberdeen) was a Scottish sculptor and artist. Many of her commissioned works are on public view in Scotland and abroad.

== Early years ==
Anne Ross was educated at the Convent of the Sacred Heart School, Aberdeen. She went on to study sculpture at Gray's School of Art, Aberdeen (1955–59), graduating top of her class with a DA (sculpture).

After training as an art teacher, she worked as the principal teacher of art (1960–68) at Gray's School of Art, her alma mater. She would go on to work as a full-time sculptor. She returned to Gray's to lecture there on sculpture (1978–82).

== African Woman and Child ==
Her sculpture African Woman and Child was commissioned by the Edinburgh City Council to symbolise the ANC's stand against apartheid. The sculpture depicts a black woman standing with a young child in front of the suggestion of a shantytown. It was unveiled on 22 July 1986 by a then-exiled member of the African National Congress, Suganya Chetty, who was then living in Edinburgh.

== Secular works ==
Her sculpture of Robert the Bruce, commissioned by Aberdeen City Council, and on display in Aberdeen Town House, shows the heroic Scottish king in 14th-century armour carrying his shield and sword. Davidson used textured materials in the creation of the original models to produce the accurate decorative effects seen in the final casts. Other secular pieces include a figure of a Gordon Highlander officer for the Alick Buchanan-Smith Award, a statue of Mary, Queen of Scots and a series of ballet figures. The oil industry, the Royal Mail, William Grant and Sons Ltd., Glenfiddich Distillery and Aberdeen City Council were among other organisations and individuals who commissioned Anne Ross Davidson to model gifts and awards for them.

== Religious works ==
In 1993, Mario Conti, then Bishop of Aberdeen, commissioned Davidson to create a small figure of St Margaret of Scotland to celebrate the 900th anniversary of the saint. Margaret had married King Malcolm III in the 11th century and the sculpture represents Margaret holding an open book and gently leading a small girl by the hand.

In 2003, during an audience with Pope John Paul II, Tony Blair, then UK Prime Minister, presented him with one of the 500 statues of St. Margaret that Anne Davidson had designed. Other important religious commissions she created were:

- Relief sculptures in St Mary's R.C. Cathedral, Aberdeen
- External reliefs for the Church of St Paschal Baylon, Liverpool
- The Madonna and Child and St Columba statues in the St Columba Church complex, Aberdeen.
- St Paul the Apostle Church, Glasgow (her final large commission, completed in July 2008)

== Later years ==
Between 1985 and 1998, she and her husband ran a popular sculpture workshop for the blind, funded by Aberdeen City Council. She taught art to children at schools throughout Aberdeenshire. She was still teaching at three primary schools until she was incapacitated by illness in September 2008. She died three months later, aged 71.

== Family ==
Anne Davidson was survived by her husband, Jimmy Davidson (a noted Scottish sculptor & calligrapher), their four children and four grandchildren.

== Affiliations ==
She was a member of the Royal British Society of women sculptors, the International Society of Christian Artists and the Society of Catholic Artists.
