= Kingdom FM =

Former radio station in Fife, Scotland

Coordinates: 56.13631666524673°N 3.1487628673256456°W

- Kirkcaldy; United Kingdom
- Broadcast area: Fife
- Frequencies: FM: 95.2 MHz (West Fife); 96.1 MHz (Central and East Fife); 96.6 MHz (Kirkcaldy); 105.4 MHz (St Andrews); 106.3 MHz (East Neuk); DAB: 11D

Programming
- Format: Adult contemporary

Ownership
- Owner: DC Thomson

History
- First air date: 5 October 1998
- Last air date: January 2025

Links
- Webcast: Kingdom FM Listen Live
- Website: Kingdom FM

Kingdom FM was an Independent Local Radio station serving Fife. It was owned and operated by DC Thomson Media and was broadcast from studios at Elizabeth House in Kirkcaldy.

The station was broadcast on five FM frequencies: 95.2 (Dunfermline and West Fife), 96.1 (Glenrothes, Central and East Fife), 96.6 (Kirkcaldy), 105.4 (St Andrews) and 106.3 FM (the East Neuk).

On 29 October 2019, it also began broadcasting on DAB via the Central Scotland MUX.

As of September 2024, the station broadcasts to a weekly audience of over 51,000 listeners, according to RAJAR.

In January 2025, Kingdom FM was rebranded as part of a merger with Original 106, another DC Thomson-owned station. While adopting the Original 106 name, the service continues to broadcast local programming from Kirkcaldy, including a dedicated local breakfast show, along with local news, travel and advertising opt-outs for Fife.

== History ==
Kingdom FM began broadcasting on Monday 5 October 1998 from studios in Markinch.

In October 2016, they relocated to a new studio complex in Kirkcaldy

The Station's current Programme Controller is Dave Connor and Sales Director Tony Chalmers

In March 2019, it was announced that Dundee based publisher DC Thomson, which already owned Pure Radio Scotland (now defunct) had bought Kingdom FM and the Aberdeen-based Original 106.

On 18 December 2024, DC Thomson announced that Kingdom FM would be rebranded under the Original 106 name from January 2025, consolidating operations while maintaining a local presence and dedicated Fife programming.

== Programming ==
Local programming was produced and broadcast from Kingdom FM's Kirkcaldy studios. Presenters included Dave and Vanessa, Martin Ingram, Gemma McLean, Micky Gavin and Lachlan McKenzie.

For many years the station ran a fully locally based schedule.

From 2020 onwards the station broadcast a mix of programming originating from both the Kirkcaldy and Aberdeen DC Thomson studios - all of which was tailored specifically for Kingdom FM's Fife audience.

=== News and sport ===
Local news bulletins aired hourly from 6am – 7pm on weekdays and 8am – 4pm at weekends with news headlines and sports bulletins on the half hour during breakfast and drivetime on weekdays. National bulletins from Sky News Radio in London aired at all other times.

== Station imaging ==
Kingdom FM's final jingle package was produced by Ignite Jingles – the station's imaging voices were Aylissa Boyce and Fraser Thompson.
