= Original 106 =

Coordinates: 57°7′35″N 2°5′36″W

- Aberdeen; Scotland
- Broadcast area: Aberdeen, Aberdeenshire, Dundee, Perth, Fife
- Frequencies: FM: 106.8 MHz (Aberdeen city, Aberdeenshire); 106.3 MHz (Peterhead, north Aberdeen); 102.0 MHz (Dundee); 106.6 MHz (Perth); 95.2 MHz (Dunfermline & West Fife); 96.1 MHz (Glenrothes, Central & East Fife); 96.6 MHz (Kirkcaldy); 105.4 MHz (St Andrews); 106.3 MHz (The East Neuk); DAB: 11C (NE Scotland); 11D (Central Scotland)
- RDS: original

Programming
- Format: Adult alternative

Ownership
- Owner: DC Thomson

History
- First air date: 28 October 2007; 18 years ago

Links
- Webcast: Original 106 Listen Live
- Website: www.original106.co.uk

Original 106 is an Independent Local Radio station owned by DC Thomson and broadcasting to Aberdeenshire, Tayside, and Fife in Scotland, with tailored content, news and advertising for each area.

As of July 2025, the station broadcasts to a weekly audience of over 101,000 listeners (within the Aberdeen area). (source: RAJAR).

== History ==
Original 106 was initially owned by Canadian media company Canwest, and was awarded its broadcast licence (the last new commercial FM licence to be issued by Ofcom) in January 2007 and the station launched on 28 October 2007 at 1:06 pm, when the first record played was "Revolution" by the Beatles.

On 12 September 2009, the station was sold to a consortium led by Adam Findlay which included John Quinn and Murray Strachan. Findlay's New Wave Media also owned now-defunct Dundee radio station Wave 102 while Quinn was the majority shareholder and chairman of Central FM in the Forth Valley.

On 20 March 2019, it was announced that the publisher DC Thomson, which already owned Wave FM, had bought the Fife-based Kingdom FM and Original 106.

From its launch until 25 June 2019, Original 106 operated from studios at Craigshaw Business Park in West Tullos, Aberdeen, before relocating to a new studio complex within Marischal Square, Aberdeen.

In north east Scotland, the station's original area, three FM transmitters are in operation; Durris near Stonehaven on 106.8 covering all north-east Scotland, a relay on 106.3 for Peterhead and Buchan which was added to the network on 8 May 2014 and a relay at Balgownie (also on 106.3FM) covering north Aberdeen which was added on 28 November 2018. Across the station's wider footprint, FM transmitters also broadcast Original 106 in Dundee, Perth and Fife.

Original 106 is available across the north east of Scotland (from 26 June 2019), and across Fife and the central belt of Scotland (from 2020) on DAB (Digital Audio Broadcasting) via multiplexes operated by Switch Digital in these areas. A UK-wide internet audio stream is available from the Original 106 website, on smart speakers and on mobile app.

On 12 September 2023, Original 106 began broadcasting in the Dundee and Perth areas on 102 and 106.6 FM respectively, following the closure of DC Thomson's station Pure Radio, the output from which replaced Dundee's Wave FM in July 2020. Under the station's licence, Original is required to broadcast a local news service for the Dundee and Perth areas.

On 18 December 2024, DC Thomson announced Original 106 would replace sister station Kingdom FM in Fife from 6 January 2025. The Fife station has retained its own local breakfast show along with opt outs for local news, traffic and advertising plus locally tailored content for each area at other times

== Music ==
In July 2018, permission was granted by Ofcom for Original 106 to adjust its music format by removing the requirement to play exclusively alternative, rock oriented tracks and widen its appeal to playing a broad range of hit music from a full range of popular genres including rock, pop, soul, dance. The focus is on hits from the 80s to the present day, plus a selection of 70s classics.

== Programming ==
More than 95% of Original 106's programming for the Aberdeen area is produced and broadcast from its Aberdeen studios, with all content produced specifically for the station. Listeners in Dundee, Perth and Fife receive locally tailored content within the station's programming. Presenter-led shows are broadcast from 6 am to 10 pm on weekdays and from 6 am to 9 pm on Saturdays and Sundays.

For the Fife and Tayside areas, the weekday breakfast show is produced and broadcast from the Kirkcaldy studios.

Local news bulletins specific to each region air every hour from 6am-7pm on weekdays and from 8am-3pm at weekends with headlines on the half-hour during weekday breakfast and drivetime.

Sport, travel and business bulletins also air at key times during the day along with national bulletins from Sky News Radio on the hour during off-peak hours.

Entertainment 'what's on' guides are broadcast daily, plus interviews and personalities from news and entertainment backgrounds, film/theatre reviews etc form a significant part of speech output.

== Charity support ==
Original 106 associates itself with a range of local charities including Friends Of Anchor, Children 1st, VSA, CFINE, Instant Neighbour, and Charlie House with the aim of publicising their work and assisting in fundraising efforts. Original's annual Christmas appeal seeks donations of non-perishable foods to stock local food banks.

In 2012 and 2013, the station hosted 24 hour marathon broadcasts in aid of the STV Appeal.

In 2016, Original 106 was nominated in two categories at the Arqiva Commercial Radio Awards; in the "Station of the Year" and "Social Action Initiative" categories.

== Online ==
The Original 106 website features local news and weather updates, and an audio stream. Audio and podcasts also feature. Original 106 has mobile apps available to download for both iOS and Android devices.

On 1 December 2016, three online-only stations were launched under the Original 106 brand; Original 106 Chart (playing non-stop current and recent hits), Original 106 Country (current and classic country hits) and Original 106 Gold (non-stop 60s, 70s and 80s hits). In 2020, the chart station was replaced by Original 106 Party, and the country station was replaced by Original 106 Rocks. Original 106 Christmas is a seasonal online station which is available from mid-November until Boxing Day every year. Original 106 Gold, Rocks, Party and Christmas are all accessible from the station website, smart speakers and downloadable app. Original 106 Gold began broadcasting over DAB digital radio in Aberdeen in February 2024.
