= List of museums in Scotland =

This list of museums in Scotland contains museums which are defined for this context as institutions (including nonprofit organisations, government entities, and private businesses) that collect and care for objects of cultural, artistic, scientific, or historical interest and make their collections or related exhibits available for public viewing. Also included are non-profit art galleries and university art galleries. Museums that exist only in cyberspace (i.e., virtual museums) are not included. Many other small historical displays are located in the country's stately homes, castles and public libraries.

== Museums ==
Name	Image	Town/City	Council area	Region	Type	Summary
Aberdeen Art Gallery		Aberdeen	Aberdeen City	Aberdeen City & Shire	Art	Website Opened in 1885 and holds work by important Scottish artists like Joan Eardley, Henry Raeburn and William Dyce, alongside contemporary collections and sculptures by Barbara Hepworth and Kenny Hunter.
Aberdeen Maritime Museum		Aberdeen	Aberdeen City	Aberdeen City & Shire	Maritime	Website The museum tells the story of the city’s connection with the sea. From early fishing through to the transition from North Sea Oil to green energy, the collection includes ship models, a lighthouse lens assembly and the entire deck of a historic steamer.
Gordon Highlanders Museum		Aberdeen	Aberdeen City	Aberdeen City & Shire	Military	Website The museum tells the stories of regiment across its two-hundred-year history, through its collection of memorabilia, artefacts, and regimental silverware. A reconstructed Moffat Trench can be explored in the museum’s grounds.
Provost Skene's House		Aberdeen	Aberdeen City	Aberdeen City & Shire	Historic house	Website Built in 1545, this is the oldest surviving townhouse in Aberdeen. The house celebrates the lives of over 100 people from Aberdeen and the North-East including innovators, scientists, writers and stars of stage and screen.
Tolbooth Museum		Aberdeen	Aberdeen City	Aberdeen City & Shire	Prison	Website 17th-century gaol
Aberdeenshire Farming Museum		Mintlaw	Aberdeenshire	Aberdeen City & Shire	Agriculture	Website Within Aden Country Park, the museum recreates the experience of farming and agriculture in North East Scotland. Telling the history of the land and the people who farmed it.
Alford Heritage Museum		Alford	Aberdeenshire	Aberdeen City & Shire	History	website, rural trades displays and tools, household artifacts and room displays, farm equipment and tools, local Royal Ordnance Corps, Doric poet Charles Murray
Arbuthnot Museum		Peterhead	Aberdeenshire	Aberdeen City & Shire	Maritime	website, development of Peterhead fishing boats, local history, Inuit artifacts, Arctic animals, whaling, coin collection, Mr. Arbuthnot's Exploration Gallery (Ethnography & Natural History), changing temporary exhibitions and hands-on fun stuff for all of the family.
Balmoral Castle		Crathie	Aberdeenshire	Aberdeen City & Shire	Multiple	Royal residence and summer retreat of Queen Elizabeth II, ballroom displays of art and decorative art, display of carriages, estate life, royal memorabilia, art gallery, gardens and grounds
Banchory Museum		Banchory	Aberdeenshire	Aberdeen City & Shire	Local	website, features local history displays, including the life of musician and composer James Scott Skinner, and the town's connection to Royal Deeside.
Banff Museum		Banff	Aberdeenshire	Aberdeen City & Shire	Local	website, local history, natural history, geology, silver, arms and armour
Blairs Museum		Blairs	Aberdeenshire	Aberdeen City & Shire	Religious	Scotland's Catholic history and heritage
Braemar Castle		Braemar	Aberdeenshire	Aberdeen City & Shire	Historic house	18th-century castle, ancestral home and seat of Clan Farquharson
Corgarff Castle		Corgarff	Aberdeenshire	Aberdeen City & Shire	Historic house	Operated by the Historic Scotland, 16th-century castle later used as a military garrison, reconstructed 1750 period barracks
Craigievar Castle		Alford	Aberdeenshire	Aberdeen City & Shire	Historic house	Operated by the National Trust for Scotland, 17th-century Scottish Baronial castle
Crathes Castle		Banchory	Aberdeenshire	Aberdeen City & Shire	Historic house	Operated by the National Trust for Scotland, 16th-century pink castle, significant collection of portraits, Jacobean rooms, gardens and grounds
Delgatie Castle		Turriff	Aberdeenshire	Aberdeen City & Shire	Historic house	16th-century castle and gardens
Drum Castle		Drumoak	Aberdeenshire	Aberdeen City & Shire	Historic house	Operated by the National Trust for Scotland, 13th-century castle, 18th-century gardens
Duff House		Banff	Aberdeenshire	Aberdeen City & Shire	Multiple	Website 18th-century country house with paintings and furniture in the care of the National Galleries of Scotland
Fraserburgh Heritage Centre		Fraserburgh	Aberdeenshire	Aberdeen City & Shire	Maritime	website, maritime heritage, local history
Fordyce Joiner's Workshop and Visitor Centre		Fordyce	Aberdeenshire	Aberdeen City & Shire	Technology	website, rural carpenter's workshop and tools
Fyvie Castle		Fyvie	Aberdeenshire	Aberdeen City & Shire	Historic house	Operated by the National Trust for Scotland, dates back to the 13th century, lavish Edwardian interiors, art collection, gardens
Garioch Heritage Centre		Inverurie	Aberdeenshire	Aberdeen City & Shire	Local	website, Artefacts from town of Inverurie and surrounding rural area of Garioch
Grampian Transport Museum		Alford	Aberdeenshire	Aberdeen City & Shire	Transportation	website The museum features collection items showcasing the history of transportation. Highlights include 19th-century travelling chariots to a 1980s Grampian Police Rover.
Grassic Gibbon Centre		Arbuthnott	Aberdeenshire	Aberdeen City & Shire	History	Detailing the life of local author, Lewis Grassic Gibbon
Haddo House		Tarves	Aberdeenshire	Aberdeen City & Shire	Historic house	Operated by the National Trust for Scotland, Georgian Palladian house with late Victorian interior, painting collection, gardens
Huntly Castle		Huntly	Aberdeenshire	Aberdeen City & Shire	Historic house	Operated by Historic Scotland, remains of a medieval castle
Johnshaven Heritage Hub Museum		Johnshaven	Aberdeenshire	Aberdeen City & Shire	Local	website, local history of Johnshaven & Benholm
Little Treasures: Grampian Toy Museum		Kemnay	Aberdeenshire	Aberdeen City & Shire	Toy	website, toy museum and shop, doll houses
The Maggie Law Maritime Museum		Gourdon	Aberdeenshire	Aberdeen City & Shire	Maritime	website, maritime and local history of Gourdon
Museum of Scottish Lighthouses		Fraserburgh	Aberdeenshire	Aberdeen City & Shire	Maritime	Historic lighthouse and exhibits of lighthouse technology and history
Peterhead Prison Museum		Peterhead	Aberdeenshire	Aberdeen City & Shire	Prison	website
Sandhaven Meal Mill		Sandhaven	Aberdeenshire	Aberdeen City & Shire	Mill	website, 19th-century mill for oats
Stonehaven Tolbooth		Stonehaven	Aberdeenshire	Aberdeen City & Shire	Local	16th-century stone building originally used as a courthouse and a prison, exhibits of local history
Tolquhon Castle		Pitmedden	Aberdeenshire	Aberdeen City & Shire	Historic house	Operated by the Historic Scotland, 16th-century castle remains
Turriff and District Heritage Society Museum		Turriff	Aberdeenshire	Aberdeen City & Shire	Local	website local history and collection from the surrounding area
Arbroath Abbey		Arbroath	Angus	Angus & Dundee	Religious	website, Operated by Historic Scotland, visitor centre with artifacts from ruined medieval abbey
Arbroath Art Gallery		Arbroath	Angus	Angus & Dundee	Art	website Artwork from the Angus collections and touring exhibitions
J M Barrie's Birthplace		Kirriemuir	Angus	Angus & Dundee	Historic house	website, operated by the National Trust for Scotland, birthplace home of Peter Pan playwright J M Barrie, adjacent cottage with Peter Pan memorabilia
Barry Mill		Barry	Angus	Angus & Dundee	Mill	website, Operated by the National Trust for Scotland, restored watermill
Brechin Town House Museum		Brechin	Angus	Angus & Dundee	Local	website, local history, art
Edzell Castle		Edzell	Angus	Angus & Dundee	Historic house	website, Operated by the Historic Scotland, ruined 16th-century castle with an early-17th-century walled garden
Glamis Castle		Glamis	Angus	Angus & Dundee	Historic house	website, Childhood home of Elizabeth Bowes-Lyon, best known as the Queen Mother
Glenesk Folk Museum		Tarfside	Angus	Angus & Dundee	History	website, Period costumes, furniture, room settings
Hospitalfield		Arbroath	Angus	Angus & Dundee	Multiple	website Former art school containing art collection and archive of Patrick Allan Fraser
House of Dun		Montrose	Angus	Angus & Dundee	Historic house	website, Operated by the National Trust for Scotland, 18th-century family house, gardens, woodlands
Inglis Memorial Hall and Library		Edzell	Angus	Angus & Dundee	Local	website Original Victorian library and exhibition on Lieutenant Colonel Robert William Inglis and his family
Kirriemuir Gateway to the Glens Museum		Kirriemuir	Angus	Angus & Dundee	Local	website, local history, culture, natural history, archaeology
Meffan Museum and Art Gallery		Forfar	Angus	Angus & Dundee	Local	website, Local history, art, collection of Pictish stones
Montrose Air Station Heritage Centre		Montrose	Angus	Angus & Dundee	Military	website Located on site of former air station, history of RAF Montrose
Montrose Museum		Montrose	Angus	Angus & Dundee	Multiple	website, Local history, archaeology, natural history, art, ethnography
Signal Tower Museum		Arbroath	Angus	Angus & Dundee	Local	website, Local history, lighthouse, fishing and maritime history, textile industry
St Vigeans Sculpture Stones		St Vigeans	Angus	Angus & Dundee	Archaeology	website, operated by Historic Scotland, over 30 Pictish stones
William Lamb Studio		Montrose	Angus	Angus & Dundee	Art	website, studio and works by sculptor William Lamb
An Iodhlann		Scarinish	Argyll and Bute	Argyll, the Isles, Loch Lomond, Stirling and Trossachs	Historic items	website, historical centre
An Tobar		Tobermory	Argyll and Bute	Argyll, the Isles, Loch Lomond, Stirling and Trossachs	Art	website, multidisciplinary arts centre with gallery
Auchindrain Township Museum		Auchindrain	Argyll and Bute	Argyll, the Isles, Loch Lomond, Stirling and Trossachs	Open-air	Turn-of-the-20th-century township
Bonawe Iron Furnace		Bonawe	Argyll and Bute	Argyll, the Isles, Loch Lomond, Stirling and Trossachs	Industry	website, operated by Historic Scotland, 18th-century charcoal-fuelled ironworks
Bute Museum		Isle of Bute	Argyll and Bute	Argyll, the Isles, Loch Lomond, Stirling and Trossachs	Local	website, island's archaeology, social and natural history
Campbeltown Heritage Centre		Campbeltown	Argyll and Bute	Argyll, the Isles, Loch Lomond, Stirling and Trossachs	Local	local history, culture, maritime heritage, Scotch whisky industry
Castle House Museum		Dunoon	Argyll and Bute	Argyll, the Isles, Loch Lomond, Stirling and Trossachs	Local	website, local history, Victorian period rooms, located in the upper floors of Castle Toward
Columba Centre		Iona	Argyll and Bute	Argyll, the Isles, Loch Lomond, Stirling and Trossachs	Religious	website, operated by Historic Scotland, life and work of St Columba and the religious community he founded on Iona in 563
Duart Castle		Isle of Mull	Argyll and Bute	Argyll, the Isles, Loch Lomond, Stirling and Trossachs	Historic house	Restored medieval castle with Edwardian period rooms
Easdale Island Folk Museum		Easdale	Argyll and Bute	Argyll, the Isles, Loch Lomond, Stirling and Trossachs	Local	website, local history, culture, slate industry, geology, maritime
Hill House		Helensburgh	Argyll and Bute	Argyll, the Isles, Loch Lomond, Stirling and Trossachs	Historic house	Early-20th-century house, interior and furnishings designed by Charles Rennie Mackintosh
Iona Abbey		Iona	Argyll and Bute	Argyll, the Isles, Loch Lomond, Stirling and Trossachs	Religious	Operated by Historic Scotland, founded by St Columba and his Irish followers in AD 563, one of Scotland's most historic and sacred sites
Iona Heritage Centre		Iona	Argyll and Bute	Argyll, the Isles, Loch Lomond, Stirling and Trossachs	Local	information, local history, culture
Inveraray Castle		Inveraray	Argyll and Bute	Argyll, the Isles, Loch Lomond, Stirling and Trossachs	Historic house	Seat of the Chief of Clan Campbell, the Duke of Argyll, 18th- and 19th-century castle with formal gardens
Inveraray Jail		Inveraray	Argyll and Bute	Argyll, the Isles, Loch Lomond, Stirling and Trossachs	Prison	19th-century living history prison
Lismore Gaelic Heritage Centre		Lismore	Argyll and Bute	Argyll, the Isles, Loch Lomond, Stirling and Trossachs	Local	website, local history, culture, contains the archive of Comann Eachdraidh Lios Mor.
Kilmartin Museum		Kilmartin	Argyll and Bute	Argyll, the Isles, Loch Lomond, Stirling and Trossachs	Archaeology	website, history of the prehistoric stones found in Kilmartin Glen, area artefacts and excavations
Mount Stuart House		Isle of Bute	Argyll and Bute	Argyll, the Isles, Loch Lomond, Stirling and Trossachs	Historic house	Victorian Gothic Revival mansion, 300-acre (1.2 km^{2}) gardens
Mull Museum		Tobermory	Argyll and Bute	Argyll, the Isles, Loch Lomond, Stirling and Trossachs	Local	website, local history, culture of the Isle of Mull
Museum of Islay Life Port Charlotte		Port Charlotte, Islay	Argyll and Bute	Argyll, the Isles, Loch Lomond, Stirling and Trossachs	Local	website, local history, culture, archaeology
Oban War and Peace Museum		Oban	Argyll and Bute	Argyll, the Isles, Loch Lomond, Stirling and Trossachs	Local	website, local history, fishing and maritime industries, railways and road transport, strategic role played by Oban during World War II
Ross Of Mull Historical Centre		Bunessan	Argyll and Bute	Argyll, the Isles, Loch Lomond, Stirling and Trossachs	Local	website, local history, culture, natural history of the Ross of Mull peninsula
Sandaig Island Life Museum		Tiree	Argyll and Bute	Argyll, the Isles, Loch Lomond, Stirling and Trossachs	Historic house	information, late-19th-century cottar's home
Slate Islands Heritage Centre and Museum		Ellenabeich	Argyll and Bute	Argyll, the Isles, Loch Lomond, Stirling and Trossachs	Industry	website, slate industry of the Slate Islands, social history
Skerryvore Lighthouse Museum		Tiree	Argyll and Bute	Argyll, the Isles, Loch Lomond, Stirling and Trossachs	Maritime	History and construction of the lighthouse
Strachur Smiddy Museum		Strachur	Argyll and Bute	Argyll, the Isles, Loch Lomond, Stirling and Trossachs	History	website, history blacksmith shop and craft shop
Torosay Castle		Isle of Mull	Argyll and Bute	Argyll, the Isles, Loch Lomond, Stirling and Trossachs	Historic house	19th-century Baronial house and garden
Alloa Tower		Alloa	Clackmannanshire	Argyll, the Isles, Loch Lomond, Stirling and Trossachs	Historic house	Operated by the National Trust for Scotland, medieval tower house, collections of portraits, silver and furniture
Castle Campbell		Dollar	Clackmannanshire	Argyll, the Isles, Loch Lomond, Stirling and Trossachs	Historic house	Operated by Historic Scotland, 15th-century medieval castle tower house
Dollar Museum		Dollar	Clackmannanshire	Argyll, the Isles, Loch Lomond, Stirling and Trossachs	Local	website, local history
Menstrie Castle		Menstrie	Clackmannanshire	Argyll, the Isles, Loch Lomond, Stirling and Trossachs	Historic house	Operated by the National Trust for Scotland, 16th-century house, home to Sir William Alexander, 1st Earl of Stirling, who was instrumental in founding the colony of Nova Scotia
Annan Museum		Annan	Dumfries and Galloway	Dumfries and Galloway	Local	website, website, local history
Broughton House and Garden		Kirkcudbright	Dumfries and Galloway	Dumfries and Galloway	Historic house	website, 18th-century town house, later home and studio early-20th-century artist Edward Atkinson Hornel, features collection of art, ceramics, furniture and literature
Caerlaverock Castle			Dumfries and Galloway	Dumfries and Galloway	Historic house	Operated by Historic Scotland, remains of a 13th-century triangular moated castle
Castle Douglas Art Gallery		Castle Douglas	Dumfries and Galloway	Dumfries and Galloway	Art	website, contemporary art and craft
Castle of St. John		Stranraer	Dumfries and Galloway	Dumfries and Galloway	History	16th-century tower house used as a home, a court, a prison, and as a military garrison
Creetown Gem Rock Museum		Creetown	Dumfries and Galloway	Dumfries and Galloway	Natural history	website, gemstones, crystals, minerals, rocks and fossils
The Devil's Porridge Museum		Eastriggs	Dumfries and Galloway	Dumfries and Galloway	Military	website, history of the HM Factory, Gretna for Cordite manufacturing
Drumlanrig Castle		Thornhill	Dumfries and Galloway	Dumfries and Galloway	Historic house	Baroque country house with period furnishings, fine art and antiques, Victorian gardens
Dumfries Museum		Dumfries	Dumfries and Galloway	Dumfries and Galloway	Local	Local history, archaeology, natural history, camera obscura, housed in an 18th-century windmill
Dumfries and Galloway Aviation Museum		Dumfries	Dumfries and Galloway	Dumfries and Galloway	Transportation	Located in a former RAF station, aircraft, military aviation history
Ellisland Farm		Auldgirth	Dumfries and Galloway	Dumfries and Galloway	Historic house	Farmhouse where poet Robert Burns lived and worked, exhibits on his life and works, also farming exhibits
Gracefield Arts Centre		Dumfries	Dumfries and Galloway	Dumfries and Galloway	Art	Scottish contemporary art, Scottish Colourists, Glasgow Boys, Kirkcudbright School
John Paul Jones Cottage Museum		Kirkbean	Dumfries and Galloway	Dumfries and Galloway	Historic house	18th-century-period birthplace of U.S. naval hero John Paul Jones
Moffat Museum		Moffat	Dumfries and Galloway	Dumfries and Galloway	Local	Located in the Old Moffat Bakehouse and focuses on local and family history
Mull of Galloway Lighthouse		Mull of Galloway	Dumfries and Galloway	Dumfries and Galloway	Maritime	website, tours of the lighthouse and engine room
Museum of Lead Mining		Wanlockhead	Dumfries and Galloway	Dumfries and Galloway	Mining	website, mine tour, miners' cottages, beam engine, minerals
Old Bridge House Museum		Dumfries	Dumfries and Galloway	Dumfries and Galloway	Historic house	website, 17th-century house displaying home life in different periods
Robert Burns Centre		Dumfries	Dumfries and Galloway	Dumfries and Galloway	Biographical	website, life and works of poet Robert Burns
Robert Burns House		Dumfries	Dumfries and Galloway	Dumfries and Galloway	Historic house	website, 18th-century house where poet Robert Burns spent his last years
Sanquhar Tolbooth Museum		Sanquhar	Dumfries and Galloway	Dumfries and Galloway	Local	website, information, local history, mining, wool trade and knitting industry
Henry Duncan Savings Banks Museum		Ruthwell	Dumfries and Galloway	Dumfries and Galloway	Monetary	website, history of the first savings bank, early home savings boxes, coins and bank notes
Stewartry Museum		Kirkcudbright	Dumfries and Galloway	Dumfries and Galloway	Local	Local history, natural history, prehistoric rock carvings
Stranraer Museum		Stranraer	Dumfries and Galloway	Dumfries and Galloway	Local	website, local history, archaeology, farming, dairying
The Museum, Newton Stewart		Newton Stewart	Dumfries and Galloway	Dumfries and Galloway	Local	information, local social and natural history
Thomas Carlyle's Birthplace		Ecclefechan	Dumfries and Galloway	Dumfries and Galloway	Historic house	website, operated by the National Trust for Scotland, 19th-century-period house with artefacts and displays about author Thomas Carlyle
Tolbooth Art Centre		Kirkcudbright	Dumfries and Galloway	Dumfries and Galloway	Art	website
Whithorn Priory and Museum		Whithorn	Dumfries and Galloway	Dumfries and Galloway	Religious	website, museum with stone grave markers of early Christians, remains of the 13th-century St Ninian's Chapel and priory, Saint Ninian's Cave
Whithorn Story Visitor Centre		Whithorn	Dumfries and Galloway	Dumfries and Galloway	Archaeology	website, archaeology and local history
Wigtown County Buildings		Wigtown	Dumfries and Galloway	Dumfries and Galloway	Local	information, local history, collection of early-18th-century bronze town weights and measures, 18th-century prison cell
Broughty Castle		Broughty Ferry	Dundee City	Angus & Dundee	Local	Medieval castle housing local history museum
D'Arcy Thompson Zoology Museum		Dundee	Dundee City	Angus & Dundee	Natural History	website Housed within the University of Dundee, contains the natural specimen collection of Sir D'Arcy Wentworth Thompson who was the first professor of biology at Dundee.
Discovery Point		Dundee	Dundee City	Angus & Dundee	Maritime	website, Museum ship for polar explorations
Dundee Contemporary Arts		Dundee	Dundee City	Angus & Dundee	Art	Contemporary arts centre
Dundee Museum of Transport		Dundee	Dundee City	Angus & Dundee	Transportation	website collection detailing the history of the local transport network
HMS Unicorn		Dundee	Dundee City	Angus & Dundee	Maritime	Sailing frigate museum ship
McManus Galleries		Dundee	Dundee City	Angus & Dundee	Multiple	Fine and decorative art, natural history, local history, ethnographic artifacts
Mills Observatory		Dundee	Dundee City	Angus & Dundee	Science	Scientific instruments, astronomy
V&A Dundee		Dundee	Dundee City	Angus & Dundee	Design	Decorative arts and design
Verdant Works		Dundee	Dundee City	Angus & Dundee	Industry	Textile industry, jute and linen
Baird Museum		Cumnock	East Ayrshire	Ayrshire and Arran	Local	website, local history, industry, Mauchline Ware, Cumnock pottery, labour leader Keir Hardie
Boswell Museum & Mausoleum		Auchinleck	East Ayrshire	Ayrshire and Arran	Biographical	information, life of author James Boswell
Burns House, Mauchline		Mauchline	East Ayrshire	Ayrshire and Arran	Biographical	website, information, artefacts and memorabilia of poet Robert Burns, who lived and worked in town between 1784 and 1788
Dean Castle		Kilmarnock	East Ayrshire	Ayrshire and Arran	Historic house	Medieval castle with connections to important figures in Scottish history, features collections of arms & armour, historical musical instruments and tapestries, located in a country park
Dick Institute		Kilmarnock	East Ayrshire	Ayrshire and Arran	Multiple	Art, local and natural history, industry
Doon Valley Museum		Dalmellington	East Ayrshire	Ayrshire and Arran	Local	website, local history, coal mining, ironworks, social history, art gallery
Dumfries House		Cumnock	East Ayrshire	Ayrshire and Arran	Historic house	18th-century Palladian country house with Thomas Chippendale furniture
Auld Kirk Museum		Kirkintilloch	East Dunbartonshire	Greater Glasgow and Clyde Valley	Local	website, local history, coal mining, iron industry
Lillie Art Gallery		Milngavie	East Dunbartonshire	Greater Glasgow and Clyde Valley	Art	website, Scottish art
Athelstaneford Parish Church and Flag Heritage Centre		Athelstaneford	East Lothian	Edinburgh and Lothians	Multiple	website, historic church with exhibit on author Nigel Tranter, adjacent centre with exhibits about the town's connections to the Flag of Scotland
Coastal Communities Museum		North Berwick	East Lothian	Edinburgh and Lothians	Local	History, heritage and culture of East Lothian coastal communities. website
Dirleton Castle		Dirleton	East Lothian	Edinburgh and Lothians	Historic house	Operated by Historic Scotland, remains of a medieval castle, gardens
Dunbar Town House Museum		Dunbar	East Lothian	Edinburgh and Lothians	Local	website, archaeology and local history
Gosford House		Longniddry	East Lothian	Edinburgh and Lothians	Historic house	Operated by Historic Scotland, restored mansion designed by Robert Adam, gardens
John Gray Centre		Haddington	East Lothian	Edinburgh and Lothians	Local	Tells stories from across the region and displays many artefacts never seen before. website
John Muir's Birthplace		Dunbar	East Lothian	Edinburgh and Lothians	Historic house	House and life of conservationist John Muir
Lennoxlove House		Haddington	East Lothian	Edinburgh and Lothians	Historic house	Medieval fortress house, collections of portraits, furniture and porcelain
Musselburgh Museum		Musselburgh	East Lothian	Edinburgh and Lothians	Local	website, local history and community curated exhibitions
Myreton Motor Museum		Aberlady	East Lothian	Edinburgh and Lothians	Transportation	Cars, motorcycles, bicycles, motoring memorabilia and toy cars dating back to the turn of the 20th century
National Museum of Flight		East Fortune	East Lothian	Edinburgh and Lothians	Transportation	Includes military planes, passenger travel, a Concorde, Royal Air Force in World War II
Newhailes House		Musselburgh	East Lothian	Edinburgh and Lothians	Historic house	website, operated by the National Trust for Scotland, 17th-century villa with early-18th-century decorative art and collections, gardens and landscape
Preston Mill		East Linton	East Lothian	Edinburgh and Lothians	Mill	Operated by the National Trust for Scotland, 18th-century watermill
Prestongrange Industrial Heritage Museum		Prestongrange	East Lothian	Edinburgh and Lothians	Industry	Remains from a 16th-century harbour, 17th-century glass works, 18th- and 19th-century potteries, 19th- and 20th-century coal mine and brick works
Tantallon Castle		North Berwick	East Lothian	Edinburgh and Lothians	Historic house	Operated by Historic Scotland, remains of a mid-14th-century fortress
City Art Centre		Edinburgh	City of Edinburgh	Edinburgh and Lothians	Art	website, changing exhibits of Scottish and international art, design, photography
Craigmillar Castle		Edinburgh	City of Edinburgh	Edinburgh and Lothians	Historic house	In the care of Historic Environment Scotland as a scheduled monument.
Dalmeny House		Edinburgh	City of Edinburgh	Edinburgh and Lothians	Historic house	19th-century Gothic Revival mansion with Regency interiors, French furniture and porcelain
Modern Two		Edinburgh	City of Edinburgh	Edinburgh and Lothians	Art	Part of the National Gallery of Scotland, modern and contemporary art, Dada and Surrealist art and literature. Formerly known as the Dean Gallery.
Edinburgh Castle		Edinburgh	City of Edinburgh	Edinburgh and Lothians	Multiple	Includes tours of the historic medieval stronghold, the Honours of Scotland crown jewels, 18th-century prisoners of war exhibits, rooms of the Royal Palace, Royal Scots Regimental Museum, Royal Scots Dragoon Guards Museum
Fruitmarket Gallery		Edinburgh	City of Edinburgh	Edinburgh and Lothians	Art	Contemporary art gallery
Georgian House		Edinburgh	City of Edinburgh	Edinburgh and Lothians	Historic house	Operated by the National Trust for Scotland, late-18th-century Georgian townhouse with a fine collection of furniture, porcelain, silver and pictures
Gladstone's Land		Edinburgh	City of Edinburgh	Edinburgh and Lothians	Historic house	Operated by the National Trust for Scotland, 17th-century-period tenement house, also art gallery
Holyrood Palace		Edinburgh	City of Edinburgh	Edinburgh and Lothians	Historic house	Official residence of the monarch in Scotland
John Knox House		Edinburgh	City of Edinburgh	Edinburgh and Lothians	Historic house	Medieval house, final home of Protestant reformer John Knox
Jupiter Artland		Edinburgh	City of Edinburgh	Edinburgh and Lothians	Sculpture Park	website Contemporary sculpture park set across 100 acres of meadow, woodland and five indoor gallery spaces.
Lauriston Castle		Edinburgh	City of Edinburgh	Edinburgh and Lothians	Historic house	19th-century mansion with Edwardian interiors, furniture and art, Japanese garden
Museum of Childhood (Edinburgh)		Edinburgh	City of Edinburgh	Edinburgh and Lothians	Toy	Toys, dolls, games, teddy bears, model trains, soldiers, tricycle, 1930s schoolroom
Museum of Edinburgh		Edinburgh	City of Edinburgh	Edinburgh and Lothians	Local	City history, culture, silver and porcelain
Museum of Scottish Fire Heritage	A white sign on a dark grey exterior wall which reads "Museum of Scottish Fire Heritage	Edinburgh	City of Edinburgh	Edinburgh and Lothians	Fire Service	website Museum dedicated to the history of fire fighting in Scotland. Collections include fire engines, safety and rescue equipment, and uniforms.
Museum on the Mound		Edinburgh	City of Edinburgh	Edinburgh and Lothians	Monetary	Art, design, technology, crime, trade and security involving currency and money
Scottish National Gallery		Edinburgh	City of Edinburgh	Edinburgh and Lothians	Art	Run by National Galleries of Scotland, the National Gallery Building is one part of the overall site. Early Renaissance to 1900 and the national collection of Scottish art c. 1600 – c. 1900
National Library of Scotland		Edinburgh	City of Edinburgh	Edinburgh and Lothians	Library	Changing exhibits of art, history and culture from its collections
National Museum of Scotland		Edinburgh	City of Edinburgh	Edinburgh and Lothians	Multiple	Scotland's history, culture, natural history, industry, technology, science, decorative arts, personalities, sports
National War Museum of Scotland		Edinburgh	City of Edinburgh	Edinburgh and Lothians	Military	Located within Edinburgh Castle, uniforms, insignia and equipment, medals, decorations, weapons, paintings, ceramics and silverware covering over 400 years of Scotland's military history
No 28 Charlotte Square		Edinburgh	City of Edinburgh	Edinburgh and Lothians	Art	website, information centre for the National Trust for Scotland, features collection of 20th-century Scottish paintings and Regency furniture
People's Story Museum		Edinburgh	City of Edinburgh	Edinburgh and Lothians	Local	website, history, lives, work and leisure of the ordinary people of Edinburgh
Queen's Gallery, Edinburgh		Edinburgh	City of Edinburgh	Edinburgh and Lothians	Art	Exhibits from the Royal collection of art, located adjacent to the Palace of Holyroodhouse
Queensferry Museum		South Queensferry	City of Edinburgh	Edinburgh and Lothians	Local	website, local history, culture, natural history, transportation
Royal Scottish Academy Building		Edinburgh	City of Edinburgh	Edinburgh and Lothians	Art	Run by National Galleries Scotland. Part of the Scottish National Gallery, changing exhibits
Royal Yacht Britannia		Leith	City of Edinburgh	Edinburgh and Lothians	Maritime	Museum ship, former Royal Yacht of the British royal family
Scottish National Gallery of Modern Art		Edinburgh	City of Edinburgh	Edinburgh and Lothians	Art	Part of National Galleries Scotland, modern and contemporary art
Scottish National Portrait Gallery		Edinburgh	City of Edinburgh	Edinburgh and Lothians	Art	Part of National Galleries Scotland, portraits of figures in Scottish history, photography
St Cecilia's Hall		Edinburgh	City of Edinburgh	Edinburgh and Lothians	Musical	Part of the University of Edinburgh, Concert room and musical instrument collection.
Surgeons' Hall Museum		Edinburgh	City of Edinburgh	Edinburgh and Lothians	Medical	History of surgery since Roman times, dentistry, pathological anatomy, sports medicine
Talbot Rice Gallery		Edinburgh	City of Edinburgh	Edinburgh and Lothians	Art	Part of the University of Edinburgh
Trinity House of Leith		Leith	Edinburgh	Edinburgh and Lothians	Maritime	Run by Historic Environment Scotland, former customs house, hospital and pilotage school, maritime objects
Water of Leith		Longstone	City of Edinburgh	Edinburgh and Lothians	Natural history	Visitor center exhibits about the river's wildlife and heritage
Writers' Museum		Edinburgh	City of Edinburgh	Edinburgh and Lothians	Literary	Part of Museums and Galleries Edinburgh. Lives and work of Scotland's literary figures, including Robert Burns, Sir Walter Scott and Robert Louis Stevenson
Blackness Castle		Blackness	Falkirk	Argyll, the Isles, Loch Lomond, Stirling and Trossachs	Historic house	Operated by Historic Environment Scotland, 15th-century fortress castle
Callendar House and Park Gallery		Falkirk	Falkirk	Argyll, the Isles, Loch Lomond, Stirling and Trossachs	Multiple	Georgian-style mansion with living history interpreters, exhibits on the house, Scottish and area history, art exhibits
Grangemouth Museum		Grangemouth	Falkirk	Argyll, the Isles, Loch Lomond, Stirling and Trossachs	Local	website, local history, industry
Kinneil House		Bo'ness	Falkirk	Argyll, the Isles, Loch Lomond, Stirling and Trossachs	Historic house	Operated by Historic Scotland, 15th- to 17th-century house open on select days, grounds include the Kinneil Museum
Kinneil Museum		Bo'ness	Falkirk	Argyll, the Isles, Loch Lomond, Stirling and Trossachs	Local	website, located in the 17th-century stable block of Kinneil House, history of the park and house from Roman times to the present
Museum of Scottish Railways		Bo'ness	Falkirk	Argylle, the Isles, Loch Lomond, Stirling and Trossachs	Railway	website, Scotland's largest railway museum, situated within the Bo'ness and Kinneil Railway, contains operational rolling stock
Aberdour Castle		Aberdour	Fife	Kingdom of Fife	Historic house	Operated by Historic Scotland, remains of a medieval castle and gardens
Andrew Carnegie Birthplace Museum		Dunfermline	Fife	Kingdom of Fife	Multiple	website, life of Andrew Carnegie, local history, art and decorative arts, costumes and textiles
Bell Pettigrew Museum at the University of St Andrews		St Andrews	Fife	Kingdom of Fife	Natural history	website, part of the University of St Andrews, collection of natural history and zoology specimens, housed in the Bute Building
Buckhaven Museum		Buckhaven	Fife	Kingdom of Fife	Local	website local history, fishing industry
Burntisland Museum		Burntisland	Fife	Kingdom of Fife	Local	website formerly known as Burntisland Edwardian Fairground Museum, recreated walk through the sights and sounds of the town's fair in 1910 with rides and side shows, accessed via the library
Crail Museum & Heritage Centre		Crail	Fife	Kingdom of Fife	Local	website, local history, maritime heritage, medieval church, airfield history
Culross Palace		Culross	Fife	Kingdom of Fife	Historic house	Operated by the National Trust for Scotland, 16th- to 17th-century furnished palace, study and townhouse with gardens
Dunfermline Abbey		Dunfermline	Fife	Kingdom of Fife	Religious	Operated by Historic Scotland, remains and artefacts of the medieval abbey, attached to Dunfermline Palace
Dunfermline Carnegie Library & Galleries		Dunfermline	Fife	Kingdom of Fife	Local	Website. Operated by OnFife and attached to the Carnegie library.
Dunfermline Palace		Dunfermline	Fife	Kingdom of Fife	Historic house	Operated by Historic Scotland, remains of a medieval royal palace, attached to Dunfermline Abbey
Falkland Palace		Falkland	Fife	Kingdom of Fife	Historic house	Operated by the National Trust for Scotland, 14th- to 15th-century royal palace and gardens
Fife Folk Museum		Ceres	Fife	Kingdom of Fife	Local	website Local history, rural life, agriculture
Harbourmaster's House		Dysart	Fife	Kingdom of Fife	Local	website, visitor centre with exhibits about the area's coastal history, natural history, geology, maritime heritage
Hill of Tarvit		Cupar	Fife	Kingdom of Fife	Historic house	Operated by the National Trust for Scotland, 20th-century mansion house and gardens designed by Sir Robert Lorimer, features French and Chippendale-style furniture, porcelain and paintings
Inchcolm Abbey		Inchcolm	Fife	Kingdom of Fife	Religious	Operated by Historic Scotland, medieval abbey
John McDouall Stuart Museum		Dysart	Fife	Kingdom of Fife	Biographical	website, birthplace home and exhibits about John McDouall Stuart, explorer of Australia
Jim Matthew Camera Collection		St Monans	Fife	Kingdom of Fife	Photography	website, Over 3,000 cameras and many other items of photographic equipment and memorabilia, collected by the late Jim Matthew, and now owned and maintained by a charitable trust
Kellie Castle		Arncroach	Fife	Kingdom of Fife	Historic house	Operated by the National Trust for Scotland, restored medieval Scots Baronial castle and gardens, features Scottish furniture designed by Sir Robert Lorimer, exhibitions of life and work of sculptor Hew Lorimer
Kirkcaldy Galleries		Kirkcaldy	Fife	Kingdom of Fife	Art	website Fine and decorative arts, holds the largest collection of paintings by William McTaggart and Scottish Colourist Samuel Peploe aside from the National Galleries of Scotland. Also contains a significant number of works by the Glasgow Boys.
Laing Museum		Newburgh	Fife	Kingdom of Fife	Local	website, local history, culture
Methil Heritage Centre		Methil	Fife	Kingdom of Fife	Local	website, local history, culture
Museum of Communication, Scotland		Burntisland	Fife	Kingdom of Fife	Technology	website, communications technology and artefacts, including early electronic devices, telegraphy, telephones, radio, television and information technology
Wardlaw Museum at University of St Andrews		St Andrews	Fife	Kingdom of Fife	Multiple	website History of the university, exhibits of art, science, manuscripts and books from its collections, archaeology
R&A World Golf Museum		St Andrews	Fife	Kingdom of Fife	Sports	website History and memorabilia of golf
Scotland's Secret Bunker		Anstruther	Fife	Kingdom of Fife	Military	website, Cold War-era underground bunker for the government in case of a nuclear attack
Scottish Fisheries Museum		Anstruther	Fife	Kingdom of Fife	Maritime	Scottish fishing industry
Scottish Vintage Bus Museum		Lathalmond	Fife	Kingdom of Fife	Transportation	website, buses and memorabilia
St Andrew's Cathedral		St Andrews	Fife	Kingdom of Fife	Religious	Operated by Historic Scotland, remains of medieval cathedral, museum with medieval sculpture and other relics
St Andrews Castle		St Andrews	Fife	Kingdom of Fife	Historic house	Operated by Historic Scotland, remains of medieval castle, includes dungeon, mine and counter-mine for siege warfare
St Andrews Museum		St Andrews	Fife	Kingdom of Fife	Local	website Local history, culture
St Andrews Preservation Trust Museum		St Andrews	Fife	Kingdom of Fife	Local	website, local history, period shop and business displays
St Monans Windmill		St Monans	Fife	Kingdom of Fife	Mill	website, late-18th-century windmill and saltpans
602 Squadron Museum		Glasgow	Glasgow City	Greater Glasgow and Clyde Valley	Military	website, regimental history of the No. 602 Squadron RAF, located in the headquarters of the Royal Highland Fusiliers
Burrell Collection		Glasgow	Glasgow City	Greater Glasgow and Clyde Valley	Art	Collections include French Impressionists, late medieval art, Chinese and Islamic art, Ancient Civilizations
CCA Glasgow		Glasgow	Glasgow City	Greater Glasgow and Clyde Valley	Art	Arts centre with gallery
Fossil Grove		Glasgow	Glasgow City	Greater Glasgow and Clyde Valley	Natural history	Covered fossilised grove of prehistoric trees
Gallery of Modern Art (GOMA)		Glasgow	Glasgow City	Greater Glasgow and Clyde Valley	Art	Website. Situated in a neoclassical, former merchant’s home in Glasgow City Centre. The gallery holds both a contemporary and modern art collection. Notable artist include Niki de Saint Phalle, Rabiya Choudhry, and Adrian Wiszniewski.
Glasgow Police Museum		Glasgow	Glasgow City	Greater Glasgow and Clyde Valley	Law enforcement	website
Glasgow Print Studio		Glasgow	Glasgow City	Greater Glasgow and Clyde Valley	Art	Artist-led centre with exhibitions
Glasgow School of Art		Glasgow	Glasgow City	Greater Glasgow and Clyde Valley	Art	Features exhibitions across its four campuses
Glasgow Women's Library		Glasgow	Glasgow City	Greater Glasgow and Clyde Valley	Women's History	website The only accredited museum in the UK dedicated to women's lives, history and achievements. The museum contains a lending library and archive collections
Holmwood House		Glasgow	Glasgow City	Greater Glasgow and Clyde Valley	Historic house	Operated by the National Trust for Scotland, mid-19th-century residential villa
House for an Art Lover		Glasgow	Glasgow City	Greater Glasgow and Clyde Valley	Historic house	Contemporary house based on designs by Charles Rennie Mackintosh
Hunterian Museum and Art Gallery		Glasgow	Glasgow City	Greater Glasgow and Clyde Valley	Multiple	Operated by the University of Glasgow, art, Roman Scotland and archaeology, natural history, geology, ethnography, ancient Egypt, scientific instruments, coins and medals, medicine
Kelvingrove Art Gallery and Museum		Glasgow	Glasgow City	Greater Glasgow and Clyde Valley	Multiple	Art, natural history, arms and armour, history
The Lighthouse Glasgow		Glasgow	Glasgow City	Greater Glasgow and Clyde Valley	Art	Architecture and design
National Piping Center – Museum of Piping		Glasgow	Glasgow City	Greater Glasgow and Clyde Valley	Music	Collection and history of bagpipes, Scottish smallpipes, Irish uileann pipes, and traditional musical instruments
People's Palace		Glasgow	Glasgow City	Greater Glasgow and Clyde Valley	History	History of the people and city of Glasgow from 1750 to the end of the 20th century
Pollok House		Glasgow	Glasgow City	Greater Glasgow and Clyde Valley	Historic house	Operated by the National Trust for Scotland, 18th-century house designed by William Adam, features collection of Spanish paintings including works by El Greco, Francisco Goya and Bartolomé Esteban Murillo
Provand's Lordship		Glasgow	Glasgow City	Greater Glasgow and Clyde Valley	Historic house	17th-century-period house
Riverside Museum		Glasgow	Glasgow City	Greater Glasgow and Clyde Valley	Transportation	Opening in 2011, collections of the Glasgow Museum of Transport
Royal Highland Fusiliers Museum		Glasgow	Glasgow City	Greater Glasgow and Clyde Valley	Military	website, regimental history of the Royal Highland Fusiliers
Scotland Street School Museum		Glasgow	Glasgow City	Greater Glasgow and Clyde Valley	Education	History of education in Scotland from the late 19th to late 20th century
Scottish Football Museum		Glasgow	Glasgow City	Greater Glasgow and Clyde Valley	Sports	Located at Hampden Park, also known as the Hampden Experience, history and memorabilia of football in Scotland
Scottish Jewish Heritage Centre		Glasgow	Glasgow City	Greater Glasgow and Clyde Valley	History	Based in Garnethill Synagogue, Scotland's oldest synagogue
Sharmanka Kinetic Gallery		Glasgow	Glasgow City	Greater Glasgow and Clyde Valley	Art	
St Mungo Museum of Religious Life and Art		Glasgow	Glasgow City	Greater Glasgow and Clyde Valley	Art	Art and artefacts of religious life in Scotland
Tall Ship at Glasgow Harbour		Glasgow	Glasgow City	Greater Glasgow and Clyde Valley	Maritime	Three-masted barque museum ship
Tenement House (Glasgow)		Glasgow	Glasgow City	Greater Glasgow and Clyde Valley	Historic house	Operated by the National Trust for Scotland, authentic 19th-century Glasgow tenement house with over 50 years of artefacts and household items
Applecross Heritage Centre		Applecross	Highland	The Highlands – Ross and Cromarty	Local	website, local history, culture
Ardnamurchan Lighthouse		Ardnamurchan	Highland	The Highlands – Lochaber	Multiple	History and operations of the lighthouse, area geology, natural history and culture
Brora Heritage Centre		Brora	Highland	The Highlands – Sutherland	Local	website, local history, culture
Caithness Broch Centre		Auckengill	Highland	The Highlands – Caithness	Archaeology	website, history of the brochs in Caithness, their construction, excavations and influence
Caithness Horizons		Thurso	Highland	The Highlands – Caithness	Local	website, local history, culture, archaeology, geology, industry, natural history and ecology
Castle Leod		Strathpeffer	Highland	The Highlands – Ross and Cromarty	Historic house	Seat of the Chief of the Clan MacKenzie, 17th-century castle with 19th-century renovations
Castle of Mey		John o' Groats	Highland	The Highlands – Caithness	Historic house	Formerly Barrogill Castle, 16th-century castle with alterations over several centuries, holiday home of Queen Elizabeth The Queen Mother
Castlehill Heritage Centre		Castletown	Highland	The Highlands – Caithness	Local	website, local history, culture
Cawdor Castle		Cawdor	Highland	The Highlands – Nairn	Historic house	Castle built from the 15th to 19th centuries, known for its gardens and connection to William Shakespeare's play Macbeth
Clan Cameron Museum		Achnacarry	Highland	The Highlands – Lochaber	Ethnic	History and heritage of Clan Cameron
Clan Gunn Heritage Centre		Latheron	Highland	The Highlands – Caithness	Ethnic	website, history and heritage of Clan Gunn
Clan Macpherson Museum		Newtonmore	Highland	The Highlands – Badenoch and Strathspey	Ethnic	website, history and heritage of Clan Macpherson
Colbost Croft Museum		Colbost	Highland	The Highlands – Skye and Lochalsh	Historic house	19th-century-period crofter's cottage
Commando Museum		Spean Bridge	Highland	The Highlands – Lochaber	Military	website, artefacts and memorabilia of the Commandos who trained nearby and at Achnacarry during World War II
Cromarty Courthouse Museum		Cromarty	Highland	The Highlands – Ross and Cromarty	Local	website, local history, culture
Culloden Battlefield		Culloden	Highland	The Highlands – Inverness	Military	Operated by the National Trust for Scotland, site and history of the Battle of Culloden, daily living history demonstrations
Dingwall Museum		Dingwall	Highland	The Highlands – Ross and Cromarty	Local	website, information, local history, culture
Dornoch Historylinks Museum		Dornoch	Highland	The Highlands – Sutherland	Local	website, local history, culture, Dornoch Cathedral, Picts and Vikings
Dunbeath Heritage Centre		Dunbeath	Highland	The Highlands – Caithness	Local	website, local history
Dunrobin Castle		Golspie	Highland	The Highlands – Sutherland	Historic house	Features 19th-century " French Renaissance meets Scots Baronial" style, formal gardens, museum displaying African wildlife trophy mounts, ethnographic artefacts, area archaeological relics including Pictish symbol stones and cross-slabs
Dunvegan Castle		Dunvegan	Highland	The Highlands – Skye and Lochalsh	Historic house	Seat of the chief of the Clan MacLeod
Ferrycroft Visitor Centre		Lairg	Highland	The Highlands – Sutherland	Local	website, local history, culture, natural history, agriculture, industry
Fort George		Ardersier	Highland	The Highlands	Military	Operated by Historic Scotland, 18th-century fort still in use, displays of its history in different periods, memorabilia of different regiments
Gairloch Heritage Museum		Gairloch	Highland	The Highlands – Ross and Cromarty	Local	website Local history and archaeology, contains the Gairloch Pictish Stone, the first Pictish symbol stone found on the West Coast mainland of Scotland
Giant MacAskill Museum		Dunvegan	Highland	The Highlands – Skye and Lochalsh	Biographical	information, life of natural giant Angus MacAskill
Glencoe Folk Museum		Glencoe	Highland	The Highlands – Lochaber	Local	website, local history, culture
Glendale Toy Museum		Glendale	Highland	The Highlands – Skye and Lochalsh	Toy	website, toys, games and dolls
Glengarry Heritage Centre		Invergarry	Highland	The Highlands – Inverness	Local	website, local history, culture, Clan MacDonell of Glengarry heritage
Grantown Museum		Grantown-on-Spey	Highland	The Highlands – Badenoch and Strathspey	Local	website, information, local history, culture
Groam House Museum		Rosemarkie	Highland	The Highlands – Ross and Cromarty	Multiple	website, 15 carved Pictish stones, local history, Celtic art by George Bain
Highland Folk Museum		Newtonmore	Highland	The Highlands – Badenoch and Strathspey	Open-air	80-acre (32 ha) site portrays aspects of 200 years of Highland rural life from the early 18th century to the mid-20th century
Highland Museum of Childhood		Strathpeffer	Highland	The Highlands – Ross and Cromarty	Toys	Dolls, toys, games, children's costume and childhood furniture
Highlanders Museum		Ardersier	Highland	The Highlands – Nairn	Military	Regimental artefacts of the Queen's Own Highlanders (Seaforth and Camerons) and Lovat Scouts
Hugh Miller's Birthplace		Cromarty	Highland	The Highlands – Ross and Cromarty	Historic house	website, Run by the NTS, birthplace of 19th-century geologist Hugh Miller
Inverness Museum and Art Gallery		Inverness	Highland	The Highlands – Inverness	Multiple	Art, history and heritage of the Highlands, natural history, contemporary craft
Iona Gallery		Kingussie	Highland	The Highlands – Badenoch and Strathspey	Art	website
Laidhay Croft Museum		Dunbeath	Highland	The Highlands – Caithness	Historic house	information, information, early-20th-century-period thatched Caithness longhouse incorporating dwelling, stable and byre under one roof
Land, Sea and Islands Centre		Arisaig	Highland	The Highlands – Lochaber	Local	website, located in Lochaber, local history, culture, natural history
Last House Museum		John o' Groats	Highland	The Highlands – Caithness	Local	information, information, local history exhibits and gift shop
Lyth Arts Centre		Wick	Highland	The Highlands – Caithness	Art	website, arts centre with exhibits gallery
MacCrimmon Piping Heritage Centre		Borreraig	Highland	The Highlands – Sutherland	Multiple	website, also known as the Borreraig Park Museum, artefacts and heritage of MacCrimmons, pipers to the chiefs of Clan Macleod, exhibition of bagpipes, local social, agriculture and rural life history
Mallaig Heritage Centre		Mallaig	Highland	The Highlands – Lochaber	Local	website, local history, maritime heritage, fishing, culture, railway
Mary Anne's Cottage		West Dunnet	Highland	The Highlands – Caithness	Historic house	website, website, 19th-century croft cottage with original fixtures and furnishings
Museum of the Isles		Armadale	Highland	The Highlands – Skye and Lochalsh	Ethnic	History and heritage of Clan Donald
Nairn Museum		Nairn	Highland	The Highlands – Nairn	Local	website, local history, fishing industry, military, agriculture, social history
Orcadian Stone		Golspie	Highland	The Highlands – Sutherland	Natural history	website, store and exhibition of rocks, minerals and fossils
Seadrift Centre		Dunnet	Highland	The Highlands – Caithness	Natural history	website, website, area natural and local history, also known as Seadrift-Dunnet Visitor Centre
Skye Museum of Island Life		Duntulm	Highland	The Highlands – Skye and Lochalsh	Open-air	website, 19th-century-period township of thatched cottages depicting typical island crofting life
St Fergus Gallery		Wick	Highland	The Highlands – Caithness	Art	website, exhibits of art, photography, culture, crafts
Strathnaver Museum		Bettyhill	Highland	The Highlands – Sutherland	Local	website, history and artefacts of Clan Mackay, local social history, archaeology
Swanson Gallery		Thurso	Highland	The Highlands – Caithness	Art	website, located in the Thurso Library
Tain & District Museum		Tain	Highland	The Highlands – Ross and Cromarty	Local history	Local culture, Clan Ross, silverwork, locally relevant historic displays and artifacts: known locally as 'Tain Through Time'
Tarbat Discovery Centre		Portmahomack	Highland	The Highlands – Ross and Cromarty	Local	website, local history, culture, Pictish stones and sculpture, medieval life and material culture
Timespan Museum and Arts Centre		Helmsdale	Highland	The Highlands – Sutherland	Multiple	website, recreations of a croft, byre, smithy and shop, displays on area archaeology, geology and natural history, art exhibits
Treasures of the Earth		Corpach	Highland	The Highlands – Lochaber	Natural history	website, geology display with simulated caves, caverns and mining scenes, exhibits of crystals, gemstones and fossils
Ullapool Museum		Ullapool	Highland	The Highlands – Ross and Cromarty	Local	website, local history, culture
Urquhart Castle		Drumnadrochit	Highland	The Highlands – Inverness	Historic house	Operated by Historic Scotland, medieval fortress castle ruins, visitor centre exhibits about its history
Waterlines Visitor Centre		Lybster	Highland	The Highlands – Caithness	Maritime	information, local herring fishing industry, geology, wildlife
West Highland Museum		Fort William	Highland	The Highlands – Lochaber	Local	Local history, culture, natural history, geology, archaeology, Highland regiments
Wick Heritage Centre		Wick	Highland	The Highlands – Caithness	Multiple	website, local history, early-20th-century-period rooms, historic photographs, civic regalia, Caithness Glass, Noss Head Lighthouse lens, herring fishing industry, art gallery
Mclean Museum and Art Gallery		Greenock	Inverclyde	Greater Glasgow and Clyde Valley	Multiple	Art, natural history, world cultures, local history, archaeology, industry
Newark Castle		Port Glasgow	Inverclyde	Greater Glasgow and Clyde Valley	Historic house	Operated by Historic Scotland, 15th-century castle
Scottish Fire and Rescue Service Museum and Heritage Centre		Greenock	Inverclyde	Greater Glasgow and Clyde Valley	Fire and rescue	Website The Scottish Fire and Rescue Heritage Museum in Greenock is dedicated to the history of Scotland's fire and rescue service. It houses a wide range of artefacts and stories from the service's long history with displays on the history of firefighting, the development of fire safety in Scotland, and the history of the building.
Arniston House		Temple	Midlothian	Edinburgh and Lothians	Historic house	18th-century Georgian mansion was designed by William Adam
National Mining Museum Scotland		Newtongrange	Midlothian	Edinburgh and Lothians	Mining	website, Victorian colliery and underground coal mine
Vogrie House		Vogrie Country Park	Midlothian	Edinburgh and Lothians	Historic house	19th-century Victorian baronial mansion
Ballindalloch Castle		Craigellachie	Moray	The Highlands	Historic house	
Brodie Castle		Forres	Moray	The Highlands	Historic house	Operated by the National Trust for Scotland, 19th-century Scottish Baronial mansion, fine art, antique furniture, porcelain
Buckie & District Heritage Centre		Buckie	Moray	The Highlands	Local	website, local history, maritime heritage
Burghead Visitor Centre		Burghead	Moray	The Highlands	Local	website, site of an important Pictish hill fort, local history
Elgin Museum (Moray)		Elgin	Moray	The Highlands	Multiple	website, local history, fossils, Pictish stones, Roman artifacts, archaeology, art, butterflies, eggs and shells
Findhorn Heritage Centre & Icehouse		Findhorn	Moray	The Highlands	Multiple	website, local history, fishing industry, marine environment, natural history, historic icehouse
Fochabers Folk Museum		Fochabers	Moray	The Highlands	Local	website, local and social history, collection of gigs and carriages, reconstructed schoolroom and history of Alexander Milne
Lossiemouth Fisheries & Community Museum		Lossiemouth	Moray	The Highlands	Local	information, maritime heritage, fishing, local history
Moray Art Centre		Findhorn	Moray	The Highlands	Art	website
Moray Motor Museum		Elgin	Moray	The Highlands	Automotive	website, veteran, vintage, classic cars, motorcycles, model cars, memorabilia
River Findhorn Heritage Centre		Forres	Moray	The Highlands	Multiple	website, natural history, geology and impact of the River Findhorn; Alexander Stewart, Earl of Buchan; model croft house
Tomintoul Museum		Tomintoul	Moray	The Highlands	Local	website, local history, culture, reconstructed crofter's kitchen and village blacksmith's shop, natural history
Brodick Castle		Brodick	North Ayrshire	Ayrshire and Arran	Historic house	Operated by the National Trust for Scotland, castle with eclectic collection of paintings, furniture, porcelain and silver, located on the Isle of Arran
Isle of Arran Heritage Museum		Brodick	North Ayrshire	Ayrshire and Arran	Open-air	website, located on the Isle of Arran, buildings include a croft and smiddy, farmhouse, cottage, bothy, milk house, laundry, stable, coach house and harness room with exhibits of island agriculture, social history, archaeology and geology
Irvine Burns Museum		Irvine	North Ayrshire	Ayrshire and Arran	Biographical	website, artefacts and memorabilia about poet Robert Burns
Kilwinning Abbey Tower		Kilwinning	North Ayrshire	Ayrshire and Arran	Local	Local and abbey history exhibits in the remaining tower of a medieval abbey
Largs Museum		Largs	North Ayrshire	Ayrshire and Arran	Local	website, local history
Mother Lodge of Scotland Museum			North Ayrshire	Ayrshire and Arran	Masonic	Historic lodge and Masonic artefacts
Museum of Ayrshire Country Life and Costume		Kilwinning	North Ayrshire	Ayrshire and Arran	Multiple	Historic Dalgarven watermill, museum with displays of rural life and trades including ploughing, threshing, harvesting and the village smithy, period room displays, costume collection
Museum of the Cumbraes		Millport	North Ayrshire	Ayrshire and Arran	Local	information, information, island history, archaeology, culture, maritime heritage
North Ayrshire Museum		Saltcoats	North Ayrshire	Ayrshire and Arran	Local	information, information, local history, archaeology, costume, transport, popular culture, maritime heritage
Scottish Maritime Museum		Irvine	North Ayrshire	Ayrshire and Arran	Maritime	website based in the Victorian linthouse and Irvine harbourside, contains Scottish maritime collections and large ships such as the MV Spartan
Vennel Gallery		Irvine	North Ayrshire	Ayrshire and Arran	Art	information, gallery in the former flax mill where poet Robert Burns worked, included his lodging house
Vikingar		Largs	North Ayrshire	Ayrshire and Arran	History	website, information, multi-media and living presentation of Viking history in Scotland
West Kilbride Museum		West Kilbride	North Ayrshire	Ayrshire and Arran	Local	website, local history, art
Cumbernauld Museum		Cumbernauld	North Lanarkshire	Greater Glasgow and Clyde Valley	Local	information, local history
Kilsyth's Heritage		Kilsyth	North Lanarkshire	Greater Glasgow and Clyde Valley	Local	information, local history
North Lanarkshire Heritage Centre		Motherwell	North Lanarkshire	Greater Glasgow and Clyde Valley	Local	Multimedia display of local history, industry, Roman era, domestic life using talking figures and interactive interpretation
Summerlee, Museum of Scottish Industrial Life		Motherwell	North Lanarkshire	Greater Glasgow and Clyde Valley	Industry	Industry, technology, social impact of the Industrial Revolution, transportation and electric tramway, recreated mine and miners' cottages
Barony Mills		Birsay	Orkney	Orkney	Mill	website, 19th-century watermill
Bishop's Palace		Kirkwall	Orkney	Orkney	Historic house	Operated by Historic Scotland, remains of a medieval castle
Broch of Gurness		Mainland	Orkney	Orkney	Archaeology	Operated by Historic Scotland, excavated Iron Age broch village and artefacts
Corrigall Farm Museum		Harray	Orkney	Orkney	Agriculture	website 19th-century-period farmhouse and outbuildings, with peat fire, livestock, horse-drawn agriculture equipment
Earl's Palace		Kirkwall	Orkney	Orkney	Historic house	Operated by Historic Scotland, remains of a 17th-century palace
Hackness Martello Tower and Battery		South Walls	Orkney	Orkney	Military	Operated by Historic Scotland, Napoleonic War-era fort and battery
Kirbuster Farm Museum		Birsay	Orkney	Orkney	Historic house	website 19th-century farmhouse and outbuildings, with peat-fired central hearth, stone beds and collection of farm tools
Longhope Lifeboat Museum		Brims	Orkney	Orkney	Maritime	website History of the Longhope lifeboat station and crew
Maeshowe Chambered Cairn		South Walls	Orkney	Orkney	Archaeology	Operated by Historic Scotland, Neolithic chambered cairn and passage grave, features Viking graffiti runes
Orkney Fossil and Heritage Centre		Burray	Orkney	Orkney	Geological	website Fossil and geological exhibits on the local area
Orkney Museum		Kirkwall	Orkney	Orkney	Local	website, also known as the Tankerness House Museum, period rooms, local history, archaeology, Picts and Vikings
Orkney Wireless Museum		Kirkwall	Orkney	Orkney	Technology	website Collection of radio and wartime communications equipment, strategic and military importance of Orkney during World War II, history of radar
Pier Arts Centre		Stromness	Orkney	Orkney	Art	website Contemporary art gallery and museum, contains fine art collection of Margaret Gardiner
Sanday Heritage Centre		Sanday	Orkney	Orkney	Local	website Local history of the island of Sanday
Scapa Flow Museum		Lyness	Orkney	Orkney	Military	website history of the naval anchorage in World Wars I and II, island history
Skaill House		Sandwick	Orkney	Orkney	Historic house	website, 17th-century house with 1950s period furnishings on site dating back to the Iron Age
Skara Brae		Bay of Skaill	Orkney	Orkney	Archaeology	Operated by Historic Scotland, excavated stone-built Neolithic settlement
Stromness Museum		Stromness	Orkney	Orkney	Multiple	website, maritime and natural history, local history
Westray Heritage Centre		Pierowall	Orkney	Orkney	Local	website Local history and archeology of the island of Westray, contains the neolithic Westray Stone
An Lanntair		Stornoway	Outer Hebrides	Argyll, the Isles, Loch Lomond, Stirling and Trossachs	Art	Arts centre with gallery
Museum nan Eilean		Stornoway	Outer Hebrides	Argyll, the Isles, Loch Lomond, Stirling and Trossachs	Local	Website; archaeology, social, domestic and economic history of the Western Isles
Taigh Chearsabhagh Museum & Arts Centre		Lochmaddy	Outer Hebrides	Argyll, the Isles, Loch Lomond, Stirling and Trossachs	Multiple	Website, local history, culture, art
Kildonan Museum		Kildonan, South Uist	Outer Hebrides	Argyll, the Isles, Loch Lomond, Stirling and Trossachs	Multiple	Website; local archaeology, social, domestic and economic history of South Uist, including a documents archive, photo collections, arts and craftwork
Atholl Country Life Museum		Blair Atholl	Perth and Kinross	Perthshire	Local	website, local history, agriculture, social history
Atholl Palace Museum		Pitlochry	Perth and Kinross	Perthshire	Medical	website, history of the Victorian spa hotel and the Hydropathic movement
Black Watch Regimental Museum		Perth	Perth and Kinross	Perthshire	Military	Located in Balhousie Castle, regimental uniforms, weapons, medals, regalia, artefacts, memorabilia
Birnam Arts		Dunkeld	Perth and Kinross	Perthshire	Multiple	Arts and community centre, features permanent exhibit on author Beatrix Potter, changing exhibits of art, photography and culture
Blair Castle		Blair Atholl	Perth and Kinross	Perthshire	Historic house	Home of the Clan Murray family, collections of fine pictures and furniture, arms and armour, porcelain, embroidery and lace, Masonic regalia, Jacobite relics
Castle Menzies		Weem	Perth and Kinross	Perthshire	Historic house	Ancestral seat of the Clan Menzies, restored 16th-century castle
Clan Donnachaidh Museum		Blair Atholl	Perth and Kinross	Perthshire	Ethnic	website, gift shop and Clan Donnachaidh history
Dunkeld Cathedral		Dunkeld	Perth and Kinross	Perthshire	Religious	Medieval cathedral, includes the Chapter House Museum with relics from monastic and medieval times and local history exhibits
Elcho Castle			Perth and Kinross	Perthshire	Historic house	Operated by Historic Scotland, 16th-century fortified mansion with three projecting towers
Huntingtower Castle		Huntingtower	Perth and Kinross	Perthshire	Historic house	Operated by Historic Scotland, 15th- to 18th-century tower house
Lochleven Castle			Perth and Kinross	Perthshire	Historic house	Operated by Historic Scotland, remains of a medieval castle, located on an island in Loch Leven
Meigle Sculptured Stone Museum		Meigle	Perth and Kinross	Perthshire	Religious	Carved Pictish stones
Michael Bruce Museum		Kinnesswood	Perth and Kinross	Perthshire	Historic house	website, information, birthplace cottage of 18th-century poet Michael Bruce
Museum of Abernethy		Abernethy	Perth and Kinross	Perthshire	Local	website, local history, culture
Perth Art Gallery		Perth	Perth and Kinross	Perthshire	Multiple	Art, local history, natural history, social history, ethnology, decorative arts including Perthshire glass and silver
Scone Palace		Scone	Perth and Kinross	Perthshire	Historic house	Early-19th-century Georgian Gothic style castle, state rooms feature collections of furniture, ceramics, ivories, and clocks
Scottish Crannog Centre		Kenmore	Perth and Kinross	Perthshire	Archaeology	website, accurate full-size reconstruction of an Iron Age crannog (ancient loch-dwelling) and artefacts
Coats Observatory		Paisley	Renfrewshire	Greater Glasgow and Clyde Valley	Science	Observatory with astronomical equipment and displays, weather and earthquake recording equipment
Paisley Museum		Paisley	Renfrewshire	Greater Glasgow and Clyde Valley	Multiple	website, local history, fine and decorative art, natural history, Ancient Egyptian artefacts, textiles, industry
Renfrew Museum		Renfrew	Renfrewshire	Greater Glasgow and Clyde Valley	Local	website, local history, culture
Sma Shot Cottages		Paisley	Renfrewshire	Greater Glasgow and Clyde Valley	Industry	website, portrays two weaver's workshops and cottages, one in the late 18th century and one in the mid-19th century
Paisley Thread Mill Museum		Paisley	Renfrewshire	Greater Glasgow and Clyde Valley	Industry	website local textile industry and textile collections
Weaver's Cottage, Renfrewshire		Kilbarchan	Renfrewshire	Greater Glasgow and Clyde Valley	Industry	website, operated by the National Trust for Scotland, 18th-century-period weaver's cottage with original working looms and spinning wheels
Borders Textile Towerhouse		Hawick	Scottish Borders	Scottish Borders	Textile	website, costumes and fashion, area textile industries, textile arts and heritage
Coldstream Museum		Coldstream	Scottish Borders	Scottish Borders	Local	website, local history, Coldstream Guards exhibit, art exhibits
Duns Exhibition Room		Duns	Scottish Borders	Scottish Borders	Local	website, located in the Duns Library, local history and art exhibits
Eyemouth Museum		Eyemouth	Scottish Borders	Scottish Borders	Local	website, local history, culture, maritime heritage
Halliwell's House Museum		Selkirk	Scottish Borders	Scottish Borders	Multiple	website, recreated historic house and ironworker's shop, art, contemporary crafts and local history exhibits
Harestanes Countryside Visitor Centre		Ancrum	Scottish Borders	Scottish Borders	Multiple	website, park with programs and exhibits of art, nature
Hawick Museum		Hawick	Scottish Borders	Scottish Borders	Multiple	website, art, local history and culture, natural history, archaeology, displays on motorcycle champions Jimmie Guthrie and Steve Hislop, period schoolroom
Jedburgh Castle Jail and Museum		Jedburgh	Scottish Borders	Scottish Borders	Prison	1820s period prison and local history displays
Jim Clark Motorsport Museum		Duns	Scottish Borders	Scottish Borders	Sports	website, exploring the life and career of motor racing champion Jim Clark
John Buchan Museum		Peebles	Scottish Borders	Scottish Borders	Biographical	website, life of John Buchan, author of The Thirty-Nine Steps and Governor General of Canada
Mary Queen of Scots' Visitor Centre		Jedburgh	Scottish Borders	Scottish Borders	Biographical	website, 16th-century tower house with artefacts and exhibits about the life of Mary, Queen of Scots
Melrose Abbey		Melrose	Scottish Borders	Scottish Borders	Religious	Operated by Historic Scotland, remains of a large medieval abbey
Abbotsford		Galashiels	Scottish Borders	Scottish Borders	Historic House	Website Home of Sir Walter Scott, chronicles the life and works of the notable Scottish author.
Old Gala House		Galashiels	Scottish Borders	Scottish Borders	Local	Local history, art gallery, history of the house, culture
Paxton House		Paxton	Scottish Borders	Scottish Borders	Historic house	18th-century country house, features gallery of paintings from the National Galleries of Scotland
Robert Smail's Printing Works		Innerleithen	Scottish Borders	Scottish Borders	Media	Operated by the National Trust for Scotland, historic print shop with printing press
St Ronan's Wells Visitor Centre		Innerleithen	Scottish Borders	Scottish Borders	Local	website, local history, spa town history, connections with Scottish writers Sir Walter Scott and James Hogg
Sir Walter Scott's Courtroom		Selkirk	Scottish Borders	Scottish Borders	Local	website, 19th-century Sheriff Court where author Sir Walter Scott dispensed justice to the people of Selkirkshire, exhibits on his life and works, as well as local poet and author James Hogg, explorer Mungo Park, local history and culture
Thirlestane Castle		Lauder	Scottish Borders	Scottish Borders	Historic house	Mansion castle with paintings, furniture, porcelain, historic toys, Victorian kitchen, gardens
Trimontium Heritage Centre		Melrose	Scottish Borders	Scottish Borders	Archaeology	website, artefacts from the excavated Roman fort Trimontium
Tweeddale Museum and Gallery		Peebles	Scottish Borders	Scottish Borders	Multiple	Art, local history
Bayanne House		Yell	Shetland	Shetland	Local	website, local history, crafts
Böd of Gremista		Lerwick	Shetland	Shetland	Maritime	website Restored 18th-century Shetland fishing booth with displays of fishing and local businessman Arthur Anderson, also houses the Shetland Textile Working Museum
Bressay Heritage Centre		Bressay	Shetland	Shetland	Local	website, local history, culture
The Cabin Museum, Shetland		Vidlin	Shetland	Shetland	Military	website World War II artefacts and memorabilia, wartime life in Shetland
Croft House Museum		Boddam	Shetland	Shetland	Historic house	website, mid-19th-century croft cottage,
Fetlar Interpretive Centre		Fetlar	Shetland	Shetland	Local	website, local history, culture
George Waterston Memorial Centre and Museum		Fair Isle	Shetland	Shetland	Multiple	Local history, natural history, art, archaeology, costumes and textiles, industry, transportation, maritime heritage
Hoswick Visitor Centre		Hoswick	Shetland	Shetland	Local	website local history, collection of old radios, fishing equipment, looms
Jarlshof Prehistoric and Norse Settlement		Sumburgh	Shetland	Shetland	Archaeology	Operated by Historic Scotland, excavated site with Bronze Age, Iron Age, Pictish and Viking-age ruins, exhibits on the site's history, settlers and artefacts
Old Haa Museum		Burravoe	Shetland	Shetland	Local	website The Old Haa is a museum, garden and tearoom in the island of Yell in Shetland. The museum has a collection of historic objects, and an archive alongside a programme of temporary exhibitions on contemporary arts and crafts. The archive has a large sound and photographic collection, including over 16,000 images.
Old Scatness		Dunrossness	Shetland	Shetland	Archaeology	Costumed guided tours of the excavated mediaeval, Viking, Pictish, and Bronze Age remains, replica Iron Age and Pictish buildings, crafts demonstrations
Quendale Water Mill		Dunrossness	Shetland	Shetland	Mill	website, restored 19th-century water mill with local history and agriculture exhibits
Scalloway Museum		Scalloway	Shetland	Shetland	Local	website, local history, culture
Shetland Museum and Archives		Lerwick	Shetland	Shetland	Multiple	website Local history, maritime, social history and a nationally significant textile collection
Tangwick Haa Museum		Tangwick	Shetland	Shetland	Local	website local history, culture, social history
Unst Boat Haven		Unst	Shetland	Shetland	Maritime	website collection of over 20 wooden boats, fishing gear, equipment, photographs
Unst Heritage Centre		Unst	Shetland	Shetland	Local	website, local history, archaeology, crafts, culture
Weisdale Mill		Weisdale	Shetland	Shetland	Art	19th-century watermill, now a visual and applied art gallery operated by Shetland Arts
Bachelors Club		Tarbolton	South Ayrshire	Ayrshire and Arran	Historic house	website, operated by the National Trust for Scotland, 17th-century thatched house where poet Robert Burns formed a debating club
Burns Cottage		Alloway	South Ayrshire	Ayrshire and Arran	Historic house	18th-century birthplace of poet Robert Burns, part of the Burns National Heritage Park
Burns National Heritage Park		Alloway	South Ayrshire	Ayrshire and Arran	Biographical	website, operated by the National Trust for Scotland, important sites associated with poet Robert Burns, planned museum to include the new Robert Burns Birthplace Museum
Blairquhan Castle		Maybole	South Ayrshire	Ayrshire and Arran	Historic house	Regency-era castle and gardens
Crossraguel Abbey		Maybole	South Ayrshire	Ayrshire and Arran	Religious	Operated by Historic Scotland, remains of a medieval abbey
Culzean Castle		Maybole	South Ayrshire	Ayrshire and Arran	Historic house	Operated by the National Trust for Scotland, 18th-century stately house castle designed by Robert Adam
Dundonald Castle		Dundonald	South Ayrshire	Ayrshire and Arran	Historic house	Remains of a 14th-century royal fortified tower house built for Robert II on his accession to the throne of Scotland
Maclaurin Art Gallery		Ayr	South Ayrshire	Ayrshire and Arran	Art	website, classic and contemporary art
McKechnie Institute		Ayr	South Ayrshire	Ayrshire and Arran	Local	website, local history and artefacts
Rozelle House Galleries		Ayr	South Ayrshire	Ayrshire and Arran	Art	website, also features the Ayrshire Yeomanry Museum
Souter Johnnie's Cottage		Kirkoswald	South Ayrshire	Ayrshire and Arran	Historic house	website, operated by the National Trust for Scotland, thatched cottage containing shoe-making tools and Robert Burns-related artefacts
Tam O'Shanter Experience		Alloway	South Ayrshire	Ayrshire and Arran	Literary	website, part of the Burns National Heritage Park, multimedia presentation of Robert Burns' poem Tam o' Shanter
Biggar Gasworks		Biggar	South Lanarkshire	Greater Glasgow and Clyde Valley	Industry	website, preserved gasworks
Bothwell Castle		Bothwell	South Lanarkshire	Greater Glasgow and Clyde Valley	Historic house	Operated by Historic Scotland, remains of a medieval castle
Brownsbank Cottage		Biggar	South Lanarkshire	Greater Glasgow and Clyde Valley	Historic house	website, operated by the Biggar Museum Trust, open by appointment, home of poet Hugh MacDiarmid
David Livingstone Birthplace Museum		Blantyre	South Lanarkshire	Greater Glasgow and Clyde Valley	Biographical	Birthplace of Scottish icon David Livingstone, featuring stories and objects from 19th century Southern Africa, Scotland, and beyond. Exploring colonialism, slavery, empire, science, and the natural world.
Biggar & Upper Clydesdale Museum		Biggar	South Lanarkshire	Greater Glasgow and Clyde Valley	History	website, operated by the Biggar Museum Trust, 14,000 years of history of Upper Clydesdale, late-19th- and early-20th-century-period shops and businesses, including a grocer, printer, bootmaker, bank, chemist
Hunter House Museum		East Kilbride	South Lanarkshire	Greater Glasgow and Clyde Valley	Historic house	Childhood home of two 18th-century medical pioneers, William and John Hunter, exhibits on their lives and medical work
John Hastie Museum		Strathaven	South Lanarkshire	Greater Glasgow and Clyde Valley	Local	website, information, local history, culture, textile industry
Lanark Museum		Lanark	South Lanarkshire	Greater Glasgow and Clyde Valley	Local	website, local history, culture, industry, William Wallace, King Robert the Bruce
Leadhills Miners Library		Leadhills	South Lanarkshire	Greater Glasgow and Clyde Valley	Local	website The oldest subscription library in the British Isles, includes objects from local area and mines and the library collection
Little Sparta		Dunsyre	South Lanarkshire	Greater Glasgow and Clyde Valley	Sculpture park	website The garden of artist and poet Ian Hamilton Finlay, includes over 275 artworks by the artist, created in collaboration with numerous craftsmen and women
Low Parks Museum		Hamilton	South Lanarkshire	Greater Glasgow and Clyde Valley	Local	website, local history, culture, Cameronian (Scottish Rifles) Regiment, agriculture, textiles, mining, Victorian kitchen
National Museum of Rural Life		East Kilbride	South Lanarkshire	Greater Glasgow and Clyde Valley	Agriculture	Formerly the Museum of Scottish Country Life, 1950s working farm, exhibits of rural room settings and oil paintings, agriculture models and machinery
New Lanark		New Lanark	South Lanarkshire	Greater Glasgow and Clyde Valley	Open-air	Restored 19th-century textile mill village
Argyll and Sutherland Highlanders Regimental Museum		Stirling	Stirling	Argyll, the Isles, Loch Lomond, Stirling and Trossachs	Military	Located in Stirling Castle, includes uniforms, weapons, medals, dioramas, regimental regalia and memorabilia
Argyll's Lodging		Stirling	Stirling	Argyll, the Isles, Loch Lomond, Stirling and Trossachs	Historic house	Operated by Historic Scotland, 17th-century townhouse adjacent to and included with admission to Stirling Castle
Bannockburn Heritage Centre		Cambuskenneth	Stirling	Argyll, the Isles, Loch Lomond, Stirling and Trossachs	Religious	Operated by the National Trust for Scotland, history and site of a significant Scottish victory in the 14th-century Wars of Scottish Independence
Cambuskenneth Abbey		Cambuskenneth	Stirling	Argyll, the Isles, Loch Lomond, Stirling and Trossachs	Religious	Operated by Historic Scotland, remains of a medieval Augustinian monastery
Doune Castle		Doune	Stirling	Argyll, the Isles, Loch Lomond, Stirling and Trossachs	Historic house	Operated by Historic Scotland, late-14th-century courtyard castle, used in the film Monty Python and the Holy Grail
Dunblane Museum		Dunblane	Stirling	Argyll, the Isles, Loch Lomond, Stirling and Trossachs	Local	website, local history, history and artefacts of Dunblane Cathedral
Inchmahome Priory		Inchmahome	Stirling	Argyll, the Isles, Loch Lomond, Stirling and Trossachs	Religious	Operated by Historic Scotland, remains of a medieval priory
Moirlanich Longhouse		Killin	Stirling	Argyll, the Isles, Loch Lomond, Stirling and Trossachs	Historic house	Operated by the National Trust for Scotland, preserved 19th-century cruck frame cottage
National Wallace Monument		Stirling	Stirling	Argyll, the Isles, Loch Lomond, Stirling and Trossachs	History	Tower monument with exhibits about 13th-century Scottish hero William Wallace
Stirling Castle		Stirling	Stirling	Argyll, the Isles, Loch Lomond, Stirling and Trossachs	Historic house	Operated by Historic Scotland, royal castle and fortress, includes Argyll and Sutherland Highlanders Regimental Museum and Argyll's Lodging
Stirling Old Town Jail		Stirling	Stirling	Argyll, the Isles, Loch Lomond, Stirling and Trossachs	Prison	website, costumed guided tours and portrayals of the Victorian-era prison
Stirling Smith Museum and Art Gallery		Stirling	Stirling	Argyll, the Isles, Loch Lomond, Stirling and Trossachs	Multiple	Art, local history, social history, ethnography, women's history, natural history
Backdoor Gallery		Dalmuir	West Dunbartonshire	Argyll, the Isles, Loch Lomond, Stirling and Trossachs	Art	website, art gallery of the Dalmuir Library
Clydebank Museum		Clydebank	West Dunbartonshire	Argyll, the Isles, Loch Lomond, Stirling and Trossachs	Local	Local history, culture, shipbuilding industry, collection of sewing machines
Motoring Heritage Centre		Alexandria	West Dunbartonshire	Greater Glasgow and Clyde Valley	Automotive	website, vintage and classic cars, memorabilia
Scottish Maritime Museum		Dumbarton	West Dunbartonshire	Greater Glasgow and Clyde Valley	Maritime	website, site of the Denny Ship Model Experiment Tank, contains model ships and details of the Denny Brothers, builders of the famous Cutty-Sark
Titan Clydebank		Clydebank	West Dunbartonshire	Argyll, the Isles, Loch Lomond, Stirling and Trossachs	Technology	150 feet (46 m) high cantilever crane used in the lifting of heavy equipment during the fitting-out of battleships and ocean liners
Bennie Museum		Bathgate	West Lothian	Edinburgh and Lothians	Local	website, local history
Cairnpapple Hill		Linlithgow	West Lothian	Edinburgh and Lothians	Archaeology	Operated by Historic Scotland, excavated Neolithic hill with reconstructed graves and visitor centre
Hopetoun House		near South Queensferry	West Lothian	Edinburgh and Lothians	Historic house	Website. Originally constructed as a stately Georgian home in the 18th century, Hopetoun House contains a collection which tells its story as the ancestral home of the Hope family.
House of the Binns		Linlithgow	West Lothian	Edinburgh and Lothians	Historic house	Operated by the National Trust for Scotland, 17th-century house with mid-18th and early-19th-century additions, collection of porcelain, paintings and furniture, parklands
Linlithgow Canal Centre		Linlithgow	West Lothian	Edinburgh and Lothians	Transportation	Website. Linlithgow Canal Museum recounts the history, construction and life around the Edinburgh and Glasgow Union Canal. On display are tools and equipment from the canals as well as model boats.
Linlithgow Palace		Linlithgow	West Lothian	Edinburgh and Lothians	Historic house	Website. Operated by Historic Scotland, ruins of a 15th-century manor palace, which was once a residence of the Stewarts and birthplace of Mary Queen of Scots.
Linlithgow Museum		Linlithgow	West Lothian	Edinburgh and Lothians	Local	Formerly the Linlithgow Story at Annet House Museum, the new Linlithgow Museum opened in Spring 2019 in the upper floor of the Partnership Centre, High Street, Linlithgow, featuring three galleries and a community space. Run by Linlithgow Heritage Trust.

== Defunct museums ==
- Abbott House, Dunfermline, closed in 2015
- Angus Folk Museum, Glamis, closed in 2017 due to structural issues, collections moved to House of Dun
- Archaeolink Prehistory Park, Oyne, Aberdeenshire, closed in 2011
- Alyth Museum, Alyth. Closed by Culture Perth and Kinross in 2024.
- Birkhill Fireclay Mine
- Brander Museum, Huntly
- The Big Idea, Irvine, North Ayrshire, closed in 2003
- Carnegie Inverurie Museum, Inverurie
- Dunaskin Heritage Centre, Dalmellington
- The Falconer Museum, Forres. Closed in 2022 by Moray Council.
- The Fergusson Gallery, Perth. The collection was permanently moved to Perth Art Gallery
- Garlogie Mill Power House, Garlogie
- Glasgow Museum of Transport, closed in 2010, collections moving to the Riverside Museum
- Glover House, closed in 2006
- Heatherbank Museum of Social Work, Glasgow Caledonian University, closed in 2004, collections now online only
- Inveraray Maritime Heritage Museum, closed in 2017 after damage to pier and removal of Aortic Penguin puffer boat.
- Inverkeithing Museum
- Jane Welsh Carlyle House, Haddington, East Lothian
- King's Museum, Aberdeen. Part of University of Aberdeen. Closed during COVID 19 Pandemic.
- Lochwinnoch Community Museum
- Marischal Museum, Aberdeen, closed in 2008, collection items now on display in the King's Museum.
- Musselburgh Doll Museum, closed in 2014
- National Museum of Costume, New Abbey, closed in 2013. Items from the costume collection are now on display in the Art and Design galleries of the National Museum of Scotland.
- Newhaven Heritage Museum, Edinburgh, closed in 2007
- Peter Anson Gallery, Buckie, Moray
- Peterhead Maritime Heritage Centre, Peterhead, closed in 2010
- Pictavia Visitor Centre, Brechin, closed 2014.
- Pittencrieff House Museum, Dunfermline, collections now on display in the Dunfermline Carnegie Library and Galleries
- Springburn Museum, Springburn, Glasgow
- Weaver's Cottage, Airdrie, North Lanarkshire
- World of Boats, Eyemouth, Owners Eyemouth International Sailing Craft Association (EISCA) entered liquidation in June 2017 and the collection was sold at auction in July 2017.

== See also ==
- Museums Galleries Scotland for a list of over 450 museums and galleries around Scotland
- Historic Environment Scotland
- National Trust for Scotland
  - List of National Trust for Scotland properties
- Tourist attractions in Scotland
