= Marischal Museum =

Former museum in Aberdeen, Scotland

Coordinates: 57.14973°N 2.09625°W

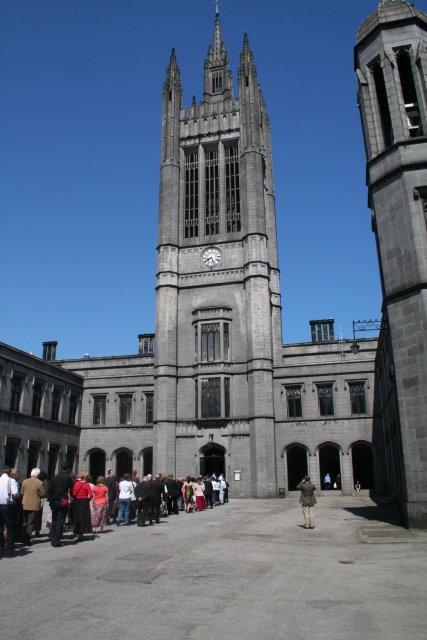
- The entrance to the Marischal Museum, at the rear part of Marischal College, seen prior to restoration

- Location within Scotland
- Established: 1907
- Dissolved: July 2008
- Location: Aberdeen, Scotland
- Owner: University of Aberdeen
- Website: web.archive.org/web/20180414172418/https://www.abdn.ac.uk/museums/exhibitions/marischal-museum.php

Marischal Museum was a museum in Aberdeen, Scotland, specialising in anthropology and artifacts from cultures around the world. The museum was a part of the University of Aberdeen, situated at Marischal College, a grand neo-gothic building said to be the second-largest granite building in the world, displaying collections owned by the university. The museum was closed to the public in 2008.

== History ==
The museum was proposed in 1899 by Sir William MacGregor, and opened in 1907. It was established and curated by Professor Robert William Reid (who was also Regius Professor of Anatomy), who did so until he retired in 1938.

=== Notable collections ===
The museum most notably housed examples of Egyptian and Classical antiquities (including mummies), non-Western ethnography and pieces relating to Scottish prehistory and numismatics. The collections are part of the University of Aberdeen's museum collections which were recognised as being of national significance by the Scottish Government.

=== Closure ===
The museum has been closed since July 2008 due to renovation work at Marischal College. Although part of Marischal College re-opened after redevelopment in Summer 2011 as the corporate headquarters of Aberdeen City Council, the museum remains closed to the public.

To allow the public to continue to view exhibits from its collections, in April 2011 the University of Aberdeen opened King's Museum, a small museum (much smaller than Marischal Museum) located in the Old Aberdeen Town House.

In mid 2021, early plans for re-opening the museum in "some capacity" were floated.
