= List of listed buildings in Aberdeen/2 =

This is a list of listed buildings in Aberdeen, Scotland.

== List ==
Name	Location	Date listed	Geo-coordinates	Notes	Category	LB number	Image
Morningfield Road And King's Gate, Morningfield Hospital, Including Porter's Lodge, Gatepiers And Boundary Walls			57°08′48″N 2°08′15″W		C(S)	46160	Upload Photo
59 Riverside Drive, Deeford, Including Ancillary Structure, Gatepiers And Boundary Walls			57°07′44″N 2°06′56″W		B	46482	Upload Photo
Duthie Park, Temperance Drinking Fountain, Including Urns			57°07′53″N 2°06′22″W		C(S)	46785	Upload another image See more images
17-29 (Odd Numbers) Ferryhill Place, Including Gatepiers And Boundary Walls			57°08′12″N 2°06′11″W		B	46786	Upload Photo
20-30(Even Numbers) Ferryhill Place, Including Gatepiers And Boundary Walls			57°08′14″N 2°06′12″W		B	46787	Upload Photo
111-119 (Odd Numbers) Great Southern Road And 89 Murray Terrace, Including Boundary Walls			57°07′57″N 2°06′29″W		C(S)	46791	Upload Photo
182 Market Street			57°08′33″N 2°05′33″W		C(S)	46792	Upload Photo
Railway Viaduct Over River Dee At Ferryhill Junction			57°07′47″N 2°05′45″W		C(S)	46800	Upload another image See more images
248 And 250 Rosemount Place, Including Boundary Walls			57°08′59″N 2°07′16″W		C(S)	46986	Upload Photo
33-39 (Odd Numbers) Belgrave Terrace, Including Boundary Walls			57°08′51″N 2°07′07″W		C(S)	47455	Upload Photo
12 Carden Place, Including Boundary Walls			57°08′42″N 2°07′08″W		C(S)	47461	Upload Photo
3 Hamilton Place, Hamilton Lodge, Including Boundary Walls			57°08′54″N 2°07′22″W		C(S)	47483	Upload Photo
8 And 10 Hamilton Place, Including Boundary Walls			57°08′55″N 2°07′24″W		C(S)	47486	Upload Photo
60 Hamilton Place, Including Boundary Walls			57°08′53″N 2°07′34″W		C(S)	47490	Upload Photo
Skene Street At Rose Street, Melville Court (Former Melville Church)			57°08′46″N 2°06′47″W		C(S)	47495	Upload Photo
14 And 16 Westfield Terrace, Including Boundary Walls			57°08′50″N 2°07′21″W		C(S)	47502	Upload Photo
Albyn Place, Albyn Cottage (Originally On Albyn Lane), Including Gatepiers And Boundary Walls, To Rear Of 1 Albyn Place			57°08′32″N 2°06′48″W		C(S)	47911	Upload Photo
114 Anderson Drive, Ataraxia, Including Gatepiers And Boundary Walls			57°08′29″N 2°08′33″W		C(S)	47917	Upload Photo
28 Forest Road, Including Gatepiers And Boundary Walls			57°08′38″N 2°08′06″W		B	47925	Upload Photo
211-229 (Odd Numbers) Great Western Road, Eldon Terrace, Including Boundary Walls			57°08′12″N 2°07′16″W		C(S)	48514	Upload Photo
403 And 405 Great Western Road At Granville Place, Including Boundary Walls			57°08′00″N 2°07′51″W		C(S)	48517	Upload Photo
34 Claremont Street, Nazareth House, Including Chapel, Entrance Lodge, Mortuary Chapel, Ancillary Structures, Gates, Gatepiers, Boundary Walls And Railings			57°08′22″N 2°07′12″W		C(S)	48522	Upload Photo
Gerrard Street Baptist Church (Former United Free Church) Including Church Hall And Railings			57°09′12″N 2°06′08″W		B	49192	Upload another image
Gallowgate, Voluntary Services Aberdeen			57°09′05″N 2°05′53″W		C(S)	50053	Upload Photo
Kaimhill Road, Kaimhill Funeral Home (Formerly Kaimhill Crematorium) Including Memorial Garden, Boundary Walls, Gatepiers And Gates			57°07′29″N 2°07′53″W		B	50178	Upload Photo
32-52 (Even Nos) Bridge Street And 19-25 (Odd Nos) Crown Terrace			57°08′40″N 2°06′04″W		B	50622	Upload Photo
Footdee, Nos 8, 9, 10, 11, 12, 13, 14 And 15 North Square			57°08′38″N 2°04′16″W		C(S)	50939	Upload Photo
Footdee, No 28 North Square			57°08′37″N 2°04′21″W		C(S)	50940	Upload Photo
26-38 (Even Nos) Union Street, Esslemont And Macintosh Department Store			57°08′51″N 2°05′46″W		C(S)	50959	Upload Photo
Justice Mill Lane And Holburn Street, Ventilator			57°08′31″N 2°06′44″W		C(S)	45663	Upload Photo
Mid Stocket Road, Oakbank School, Governor's House			57°08′58″N 2°08′27″W		C(S)	45665	Upload Photo
70 Rubislaw Den North, Selsden, Including Gatepiers And Boundary Walls			57°08′40″N 2°08′33″W		B	20784	Upload Photo
72 Rubislaw Den North, Including Gatepiers And Boundary Walls			57°08′40″N 2°08′34″W		B	20785	Upload Photo
5 And 7 Rubislaw Den South At Spademill Road, Including Gatepiers And Boundary Walls			57°08′33″N 2°08′07″W		C(S)	20789	Upload Photo
22 Rubislaw Den South, Including Gatepiers And Boundary Walls			57°08′35″N 2°08′15″W		C(S)	20802	Upload Photo
66 Rubislaw Den South, Including Gatepiers And Boundary Walls			57°08′33″N 2°08′41″W		B	20820	Upload Photo
Eday Road Woodend Hospital, Main Building			57°08′50″N 2°10′18″W		B	20826	Upload Photo
Eday Road Woodend Hospital Westholme			57°08′47″N 2°10′23″W		B	20829	Upload Photo
1-5 (Odd Nos) St Nicholas Street			57°08′50″N 2°05′53″W		C(S)	20686	Upload Photo
42-44 Union Terrace, 3 Skene Terrace And 26 North Silver Street, Union Hall			57°08′51″N 2°06′22″W		B	20691	Upload Photo
43 Forest Road At Carlton Place, Including Gatepiers And Boundary Walls			57°08′41″N 2°08′05″W		B	20699	Upload Photo
14 And 16 Forest Road At Rubislaw Den South, Including Gatepiers And Boundary Walls			57°08′33″N 2°08′02″W		C(S)	20700	Upload Photo
49 And 51 Queen's Road, Including Gatepiers And Boundary Walls			57°08′27″N 2°08′07″W		C(S)	20728	Upload Photo
52 And 54 Queen's Road, Including Gatepiers And Boundary Walls			57°08′30″N 2°08′08″W		B	20741	Upload Photo
66 And 68 Queen's Road, Including Gatepiers And Boundary Walls			57°08′29″N 2°08′13″W		C(S)	20746	Upload Photo
108 Queen's Road, And Royfold Crescent			57°08′24″N 2°08′39″W		C(S)	20756	Upload Photo
114 Queen's Road			57°08′23″N 2°08′42″W		B	20758	Upload Photo
5, 5A And 5B Rubislaw Den North, Including Gatepiers And Boundary Walls			57°08′40″N 2°08′10″W		C(S)	20761	Upload Photo
2 And 4 Rubislaw Den North At Forest Road, Including Boundary Walls			57°08′41″N 2°08′08″W		C(S)	20768	Upload Photo
1-4 (Inclusive Numbers), 5, 5A, 6-8 (Inclusive Numbers), 9A, 9B, 10A, 10B, 10C, 11 And 11A Queen's Gardens, Off Queen's Road, Including Gatepiers, Railings And Boundary Walls			57°08′35″N 2°07′41″W		B	20636	Upload Photo
Kepplestone House 179 Queen's Road			57°08′18″N 2°08′59″W		B	20639	Upload Photo
12 Exchange Street			57°08′45″N 2°05′51″W		C(S)	20659	Upload Photo
20-24 (Even Nos) Guild Street, St Magnus Court, Including 19-23 (Odd Nos) Stirling Street And 22-28 (Even Nos) Exchange Street And 2 Imperial Place			57°08′43″N 2°05′49″W		C(S)	20662	Upload Photo
78 And 80 Guild Street, The Station Hotel			57°08′41″N 2°05′55″W		B	20663	Upload Photo
19 Correction Wynd, Commercial Building At Corner Of St Nicholas Lane			57°08′49″N 2°05′56″W		B	20681	Upload Photo
3-13 (Inclusive Numbers) South Crown Street, Including Boundary Walls			57°08′13″N 2°06′02″W		C(S)	20616	Upload Photo
Stirling Street, Trinity Street And Carmelite Lane, Carmelite Hotel			57°08′44″N 2°05′52″W		B	20619	Upload Photo
31 And 37-49 (Odd Numbers) Argyll Place, Including Boundary Walls			57°09′03″N 2°07′29″W		B	20623	Upload Photo
88 Fountainhall Road At Hamilton Place, Including Gates, Gatepiers And Boundary Walls			57°08′49″N 2°07′45″W		C(S)	20632	Upload Photo
32 Westburn Road, Asylum Lodge			57°09′12″N 2°06′52″W		C(S)	20599	Upload another image
Wrights' And Coopers' Place (House 3; Old Number 5)			57°09′59″N 2°06′06″W		B	20601	Upload Photo
Rosemount Viaduct, His Majesty's Theatre			57°08′53″N 2°06′18″W		A	20605	Upload another image
1-7 Abbotsford Place (Inclusive Numbers), Including Boundary Walls			57°08′17″N 2°06′11″W		C(S)	20608	Upload Photo
Union Street, 257,259			57°08′40″N 2°06′21″W		B	20537	Upload Photo
82-106 (Even Nos) Union Street			57°08′49″N 2°05′54″W		C(S)	20554	Upload Photo
158-164 (Even Nos) Union Street			57°08′44″N 2°06′15″W		B	20563	Upload Photo
6 And 8 Upperkirkgate			57°08′57″N 2°05′53″W		B	20578	Upload Photo
78-82 (Even Nos) St Clement Street, 25-31 (Odd Nos) York Place And 26-32 (Even Nos) Wellington Street			57°08′44″N 2°04′48″W		B	20477	Upload Photo
St. Machar Drive, 80 Old Aberdeen			57°10′01″N 2°05′59″W		B	20481	Upload Photo
North Silver Street 27, 29 And 33 Skene Terrace			57°08′50″N 2°06′24″W		C(S)	20490	Upload Photo
Spital, 49			57°09′31″N 2°06′00″W		B	20509	Upload Photo
118-122 (Even Nos) King Street			57°09′03″N 2°05′37″W		B	20408	Upload Photo
142 King Street			57°09′04″N 2°05′36″W		C(S)	20412	Upload Photo
5-9 (Odd Nos) Marischal Street			57°08′52″N 2°05′35″W		B	20423	Upload Photo
29-33 (Odd Nos) Marischal Street			57°08′51″N 2°05′34″W		B	20427	Upload Photo
49-53 (Odd Nos) Marischal Street			57°08′48″N 2°05′31″W		C(S)	20431	Upload Photo
55, 57 Marischal Street			57°08′48″N 2°05′30″W		B	20432	Upload Photo
28-32 (Even Nos) Marischal Street			57°08′50″N 2°05′35″W		B	20436	Upload Photo
41 And 42 Regent Quay			57°08′48″N 2°05′26″W		B	20463	Upload Photo
76, 77 And 78 Regent Quay			57°08′48″N 2°05′16″W		C(S)	20468	Upload Photo
Golden Square, 10, 11, 12			57°08′47″N 2°06′19″W		B	20325	Upload Photo
90 And 92 Hamilton Place, Including Gatepiers And Boundary Walls			57°08′50″N 2°07′44″W		A	20342	Upload another image
High Street, 25, (West Side)			57°09′54″N 2°06′08″W		B	20350	Upload Photo
High Street, 65, (West Side) And 2 Thom's Place, Old Aberdeen			57°09′57″N 2°06′08″W		B	20358	Upload Photo
High Street, 111, 113 (West Side) Old Aberdeen			57°10′01″N 2°06′09″W		B	20366	Upload Photo
High Street, 70 (East Side) Old Aberdeen			57°09′57″N 2°06′07″W		B	20370	Upload Photo
Old Aberdeen, High Street, Shed Immediately To North Of Number 70			57°09′58″N 2°06′07″W		C(S)	20371	Upload Photo
High Street, 90 (East Side) Old Aberdeen			57°10′00″N 2°06′08″W		B	20373	Upload Photo
High Street, 96 (East Side) Old Aberdeen			57°10′00″N 2°06′07″W		A	20374	Upload another image See more images
Huntly Street, 23, 25, 27			57°08′42″N 2°06′24″W		C(S)	20380	Upload Photo
1-7 (Odd Nos) Justice Street, Including Pend To Chapel Court			57°08′55″N 2°05′14″W		B	20384	Upload Photo
77-97 (Odd Nos) King Street			57°09′01″N 2°05′39″W		B	20389	Upload Photo
159-173 (Odd Nos) King Street			57°09′05″N 2°05′40″W		C(S)	20392	Upload Photo
36-48 (Even Nos) King Street			57°08′58″N 2°05′36″W		B	20400	Upload Photo
Golden Square, 1, 2, 3			57°08′44″N 2°06′16″W		B	20322	Upload Photo
College Bounds, 10, 12 (East Side) Old Aberdeen			57°09′43″N 2°06′05″W		B	20224	Upload Photo
College Bounds, 14 (East Side) Old Aberdeen			57°09′43″N 2°06′05″W		B	20225	Upload Photo
College Bounds, 18 (East Side) Old Aberdeen			57°09′44″N 2°06′05″W		B	20226	Upload Photo
College Bounds, 42 (East Side) Old Aberdeen			57°09′46″N 2°06′06″W		B	20233	Upload Photo
College Bounds, 44, 46 (East Side) Old Aberdeen			57°09′47″N 2°06′06″W		B	20234	Upload Photo
Crown Street, Former Trinity Uf Church			57°08′37″N 2°06′10″W		C(S)	20239	Upload Photo
Crown Street 111-119 And 9 St. Mary's Place			57°08′33″N 2°06′05″W		B	20245	Upload Photo
8-10 (Even Nos) Crown Street With 1-3 (Odd Nos) Langstane Place (Including The Star And Garter Ph)			57°08′41″N 2°06′14″W		B	20247	Upload Photo
77 Dee Street			57°08′31″N 2°06′09″W		C(S)	20265	Upload Photo
9 And 10 Devanha Terrace, Including Boundary Walls And Railings Enclosing Garden Across Road Opposite Front Elevation			57°08′14″N 2°06′00″W		C(S)	20269	Upload Photo
Don Street, 25 (West Side) Old Aberdeen			57°10′04″N 2°06′06″W		C(S)	20277	Upload Photo
Don Street, 43 (West Side) Old Aberdeen			57°10′05″N 2°06′03″W		B	20279	Upload Photo
Don Street, 18 (East Side) Old Aberdeen			57°10′03″N 2°06′06″W		B	20287	Upload Photo
Don Street, 28 (East Side) Old Aberdeen			57°10′04″N 2°06′05″W		C(S)	20289	Upload Photo
1 And 2 Carden Terrace, Including Boundary Walls			57°08′41″N 2°07′04″W		C(S)	20158	Upload Photo
5 And 6 Carden Terrace, Including Boundary Walls			57°08′40″N 2°07′08″W		C(S)	20161	Upload Photo
19-23 (Inclusive Nos) Castle Street			57°08′55″N 2°05′33″W		B	20167	Upload Photo
42-44 (Inclusive Nos) Castle Street			57°08′53″N 2°05′33″W		C(S)	20170	Upload Photo
55, 56 And 57 Castle Street			57°08′51″N 2°05′38″W		B	20175	Upload Photo
Chanonry, 13 Boundary Walls			57°10′08″N 2°06′09″W		B	20193	Upload Photo
College Bounds, 1 (West Side) Old Aberdeen			57°09′42″N 2°06′05″W		B	20206	Upload Photo
College Bounds, 29 (West Side) Old Aberdeen			57°09′46″N 2°06′07″W		B	20215	Upload Photo
College Bounds (West Side) Walls And Gates Powis Lodge			57°09′50″N 2°06′09″W		B	20219	Upload another image See more images
34 Albyn Place, Including Gatepiers And Boundary Walls			57°08′34″N 2°07′24″W		B	20123	Upload Photo
Bon Accord Street, 56, 58			57°08′31″N 2°06′19″W		B	20147	Upload Photo
Bon Accord Street, 64-68 (Even Nos)			57°08′30″N 2°06′18″W		C(S)	20149	Upload Photo
Skene Street And Esslemont Avenue, Aberdeen Grammar School			57°08′49″N 2°06′53″W		B	20084	Upload another image See more images
Esslemont Avenue At Rosemount Place And Belgrave Terrace, Rosemount Community Education Centre (Formerly Rosemount School), Including Boundary Walls			57°08′58″N 2°07′02″W		B	20091	Upload Photo
Ashgrove House, 49 Beattie Avenue			57°09′33″N 2°07′25″W		B	20097	Upload Photo
12 And 14 Devanha Gardens, Devanha House, Including Piers And Boundary Walls			57°08′10″N 2°06′08″W		A	20098	Upload another image
Old Aberdeen Town House, High Street, Old Aberdeen			57°10′02″N 2°06′08″W		A	19992	Upload another image
Public Library, Rosemount Viaduct			57°08′53″N 2°06′21″W		C(S)	19993	Upload another image See more images
Aberdeen Royal Infirmary Woolmanhill			57°08′57″N 2°06′20″W		A	19995	Upload another image
Gordon, Rev. Charles, St. Peter's R.C. School, Nelson Street			57°09′17″N 2°05′49″W		B	20008	Upload Photo
March Stone No. 60 In Froghall Road Outside Granite Works Of Charles Mcdonald Ltd. And Opposite No. 26			57°09′26″N 2°06′11″W		B	20040	Upload another image
March Stone Cr At Rear Of Foot Pavement On South-West Side Of Jack's Brae About 60 Yards South East Of Northfield Place			57°08′54″N 2°06′42″W		B	20048	Upload Photo
St. Peter's Cemetery, Moir Of Scotstoun Mausoleum			57°09′36″N 2°05′57″W		C(S)	20061	Upload Photo
Stonehaven Road And Anderson Drive South, Bridge Of Dee, Over River Dee, Including Sundial			57°07′22″N 2°07′08″W		A	20068	Upload another image See more images
Riverside Drive, Ruthrieston Pack Bridge Over Ruthrieston Burn			57°07′33″N 2°07′05″W		B	20071	Upload another image See more images
Victoria Bridge Over River Dee, At Market Street And Victoria Road			57°08′24″N 2°05′22″W		B	20072	Upload another image See more images
Craigiebuckler Church (C. Of S.), Springfield Road			57°08′16″N 2°09′18″W		B	19938	Upload Photo
St. Machar's Cathedral, Chanonry			57°10′12″N 2°06′08″W		A	19957	Upload another image
St. Mary's (R. C.) Cathedral, Presbytery And Halls, 16-20 Huntly Street			57°08′43″N 2°06′23″W		B	19962	Upload Photo
Belmont Street, Former West St Nicholas Kirk House			57°08′48″N 2°06′03″W		B	19970	Upload Photo
St. Peter's Court 191 Victoria Road, Torry			57°08′13″N 2°04′57″W		B	19972	Upload Photo
Clifton Manor 352 Clifton Road Woodside			57°10′13″N 2°07′41″W		B	19975	Upload Photo
Schoolhill And Blackfriars Street, Art Gallery Including War Memorial And Cowdray Hall, Robert Gordon's College Archway And Former Gray's School Of Art			57°08′53″N 2°06′10″W		A	19978	Upload another image
25 Fonthill Terrace, The Kessocks, Including Boundary Wall			57°08′10″N 2°06′35″W		B	46479	Upload Photo
Hardgate At Strawberry Bank Gardens, The Hardgate Well			57°08′33″N 2°06′32″W		C(S)	46520	Upload Photo
Duthie Park, Bowling Pavilion			57°07′51″N 2°06′02″W		C(S)	46778	Upload Photo
62 And 64 Polmuir Road, Including Steps And Boundary Wall			57°07′59″N 2°06′11″W		C(S)	46799	Upload Photo
Rosemount Place And Loanhead Terrace, Rosemount Parish Church Celebration Centre (Church Of Scotland), Including Hall			57°09′00″N 2°06′58″W		C(S)	46985	Upload Photo
222 And 224 Westburn Road, Including Boundary Walls And Railings			57°09′10″N 2°07′42″W		C(S)	46991	Upload Photo
Mid Stocket Road And Gordondale Road, Mile-End Primary School, Including Servitor's House, Gates, Gatepiers, Boundary Walls And Railings			57°08′56″N 2°07′54″W		C(S)	46994	Upload Photo

== Key ==
The scheme for classifying buildings in Scotland is:

- Category A: "buildings of national or international importance, either architectural or historic; or fine, little-altered examples of some particular period, style or building type."
- Category B: "buildings of regional or more than local importance; or major examples of some particular period, style or building type, which may have been altered."
- Category C: "buildings of local importance; lesser examples of any period, style, or building type, as originally constructed or moderately altered; and simple traditional buildings which group well with other listed buildings."

In March 2016 there were 47,288 listed buildings in Scotland. Of these, 8% were Category A, and 50% were Category B, with the remaining 42% being Category C.

== See also ==
- List of listed buildings in Aberdeen
