= Strathnaver Museum =

Scottish museum

- Established: 1976
- Coordinates: 58.529330591087174°N 4.2093467693099145°W

Strathnaver Museum is located in Bettyhill, Sutherland, Scotland. It is a fully accredited volunteer-run independent museum which first opened in 1976. It explores the history of north west Sutherland through the context of the Highland Clearances. The Clan Mackay Centre is located on the 1st floor of the main museum building.

== Origins ==
The former parish church became redundant in the 1950s when the congregation moved to the Church of Scotland building in Bettyhill. The community led by Historian and broadcaster Dr Ian Grimble developed the idea to create a museum for the district.

The Church of Scotland transferred the building to the community for a peppercorn sum in May 1962. In what must have been one of the earliest community asset transfers in Scotland.

The community set about building a collection of artefacts and developing the building to be opened as a museum. The museum opened to the public in 1976.

The group achieved museum registration in 1994 and became fully accredited under the museum accreditation scheme in 2013.

== The Building ==
Strathnaver Museum is located in the regionally important B listed former parish Church of Scotland. The church was built in 1774 replacing a former church, the site having been one of ecclesiastical interest for at least 1,000 years. The Pictish Farr Stone (c.850AD) can be found at the west gable of the building, alongside 3 early grave markers.

The original pulpit dominates the main room in the museum and is fronted by a reader's desk. The panelled and dated backboard initialled MGM for Master George Munro, minister 1754-79. Revd George Munro's tomb can be found in the graveyard which surrounds the museum.

In 1882 the interior was reduced in size by the removal of the galleries and the insertion of party walls. The congregation fell due to the impact of the Great Disruption, when many of the congregation, joined the Free Church of Scotland established in 1843. The effect of emigration, as a consequence of the Highland Clearances, also led to a decimation of the congregation.

Rev David Mackenzie was minister of Farr during the time of the Sutherland Clearances, and as a Gaelic speaker he was tasked by Sutherland Estate to read eviction notices to the evicted tenants. Initially supportive of the improvements being driven by the Countess and Marquess of Sutherland he changed his opinion as a consequence of the lack of provisions being made for the people who were removed. Rev Mackenzie joined the Free Church in 1843.

In 2021 the museum undertook a major refurbishment to secure the future of the historic building and the collection it contains. Funded by Natural and Cultural Fund, National Lottery Heritage Fund, SSE, Highlands and Islands Enterprise, Dounreay, Museum Galleries Scotland, Caithness and North Sutherland Fund, The Wolfson Foundation, and Garfield Weston Foundation.

The museum was sympathetically refurbished and a new building created to house some of the larger agricultural and fishing exhibits. The refurbished museum and new annex building relaunched on 13th May 2023.

== The Collection ==
Strathnaver Museum contains an eclectic collection of artefacts exploring the history of the area from pre-history through to the modern day. The collection includes an intact Bronze Age burial beaker, early 19th century croft house display, tools, agricultural and fishing exhibits, including the gruesome dog skin buoy, militaria, Clan Mackay memorabilia, and contemporary art.
