= Museum Accreditation in the UK =

UK system for accrediting museums

Museum Accreditation in the UK is a process whereby a museum is recognised as meeting best standards in the field in terms of governance and management, collections care and management, and information and services provided to users.

== History ==
The scheme emerged from the museum sector. The scheme was established in 1988 as the Registration Scheme. It was rebranded the Accreditation Standard in 2005.

The Accreditation Standard and guidance for museums were reviewed and updated in 2018–19. There was another review in 2023–24.

=== Covid-19 ===
During the COVID-19 pandemic, the Accreditation Scheme was paused from 1 April 2020 and accredited status extended.

== Requirements ==
Three areas of standards must be met to become accredited: organisational health, collections, and users and their experiences. Within each area are more specific requirements.

=== Organisation ===
- The organisation must have good governance and management
- There must be a plan for the future and evidence of sufficient resources to deliver this plan
- Risks must be assessed and managed.

=== Collections ===
- Collections must be held and developed
- There must be usable and useful information about collections
- Collections must be cared for and conserved. (Note: Brittni Bradford has observed that accreditation requirements for emergency planning for collections care do not make reference to the Hague Convention or require mitigation of risks posed by armed conflict.)

=== Users ===
- The organisation must be accessible to the public
- It must show evidence of understanding and developing audiences
- It must engage with users and seek to improve their experiences.

== Process ==
Most museums are required to submit an initial eligibility questionnaire for assessment. A local team makes an initial assessment and submits recommendations to the accreditation manager of the relevant national body (Arts Council England (ACE), Museums Galleries Scotland (MGS), Northern Ireland Museums Council, or the Welsh Government). If the body decide to grant approval, the museum is classed as "Working Towards Accreditation" and must submit a full application demonstrating compliance with the three required areas within three years.

In Scotland, museums must either subscribe to MGS or pay a fee for accreditation. Museums in Scotland but covered by the National Heritage (Scotland) Act 1985 receive accreditation from Arts Council England.

Museums are accredited fully for five years and then must demonstrate that they continue to meet standards on a returns schedule.

== Organising bodies ==
The Accreditation Scheme is managed by ACE, MGS, Northern Ireland Museums Council, and the Welsh Government.

From 2014, Hadrian Ellory-van Dekker was appointed chair of the committee.

== Recognised museums ==
About 1800 of the around 2500 museums in the UK are accredited, up from 1304 in 2017. 250 museums in Scotland are Accredited.

Glasgow Women's Library is the only UK accredited museum dedicated to women's history.

== Consequences ==
Museums may apply for accreditation to gain prestige, advice, access to funding or other resources. Losing accreditation can lead to reputational harm and reduced access to funding and resources.

=== Funding ===
Museums do not need to be accredited to apply for Museum and Gallery Exhibitions Tax Relief. However, several funding schemes, including those from Art Fund, the Royal Society, and Arts Council England, do require museums to be accredited, in the process of becoming accredited, or to justify why not.

Museums including the Museum of Croydon and Northampton Museum lost accredited status for selling parts of their collections to raise funds. This made them ineligible for some funding streams.

=== Networking ===
Accredited museums are part of a UK network. When Bury Art Museum lost accreditation in 2005 due to the sale of a Lowry painting, it was excluded from British networks. After a successful international touring program, the museum was reaccredited in 2014.

=== Collections ===
Accredited museums are able to apply to the Treasure Trove Unit to apply for ownership of significant archaeological finds.

Museum accreditation can limit what can be done with collections in terms of engagement, in order to meet professional standards.

=== Loans and touring exhibitions ===
Becoming accredited enables museums to host touring exhibitions. British museums that are accredited may not be able to loan artefacts to museums that are not accredited.

=== Impact on the sector ===
Jeffrey Abt has suggested that accreditation was part of a trend toward professionalisation and the emergence of the public museum.

== 2025 review ==
In 2025, director of museums and cultural property for ACE, Emmie Kell, announced that there would be a review of accreditation. Kell spoke of the challenging financial situation the sector faced. Accreditation will remain open during the review.

== See also ==
- The Institute of Conservation (ICON)
- Museum Accreditation in America
