= Old Aberdeen =

Area of Aberdeen, Scotland

Coordinates: 57.1648°N 2.1024°W

Old Aberdeen: Scottish Gaelic: Seann Obar Dheathain; Scots: Auld Aiberdeen
- Arms of Old Aberdeen

- Location within the Aberdeen City council area Location within Scotland
- OS grid reference: NJ939082
- Council area: Aberdeen City
- Lieutenancy area: Aberdeen
- Country: Scotland
- Sovereign state: United Kingdom
- Post town: ABERDEEN
- Postcode district: AB24
- Dialling code: 01224
- Police: Scotland
- Fire: Scottish
- Ambulance: Scottish
- UK Parliament: Aberdeen North
- Scottish Parliament: Aberdeen Central
- Website: oldaberdeen.org.uk

Old Aberdeen is part of Aberdeen in Scotland. Old Aberdeen was originally a separate burgh, which was erected into a burgh of barony on 26 December 1489. It was incorporated into adjacent Aberdeen by the Aberdeen Corporation Act 1891 (54 & 55 Vict. c. cxxiv). It retains the status of a community council area.

The town's motto is "concordia res parvae crescunt" ("through harmony, small things increase").

== Location ==
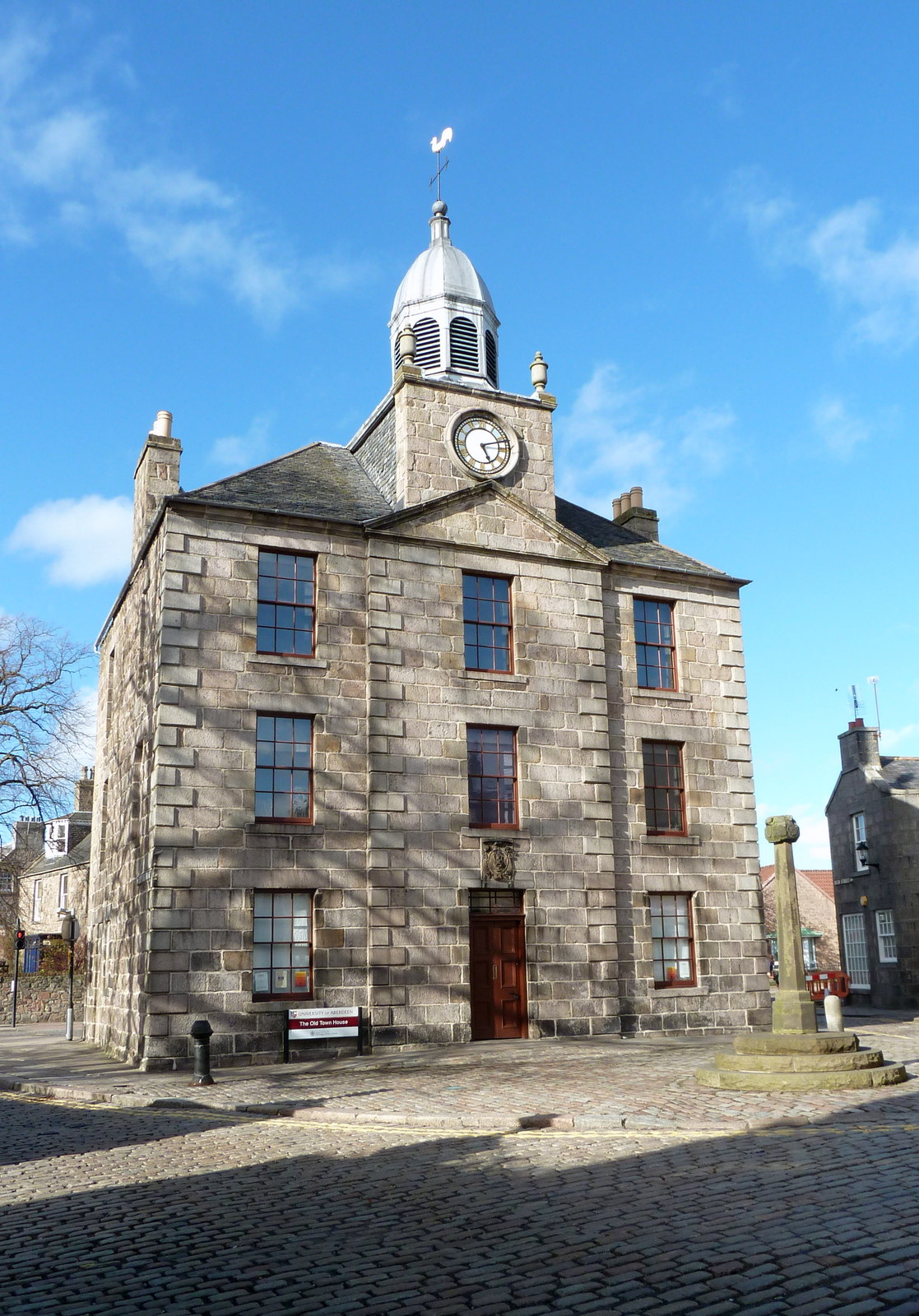
The Old Town House

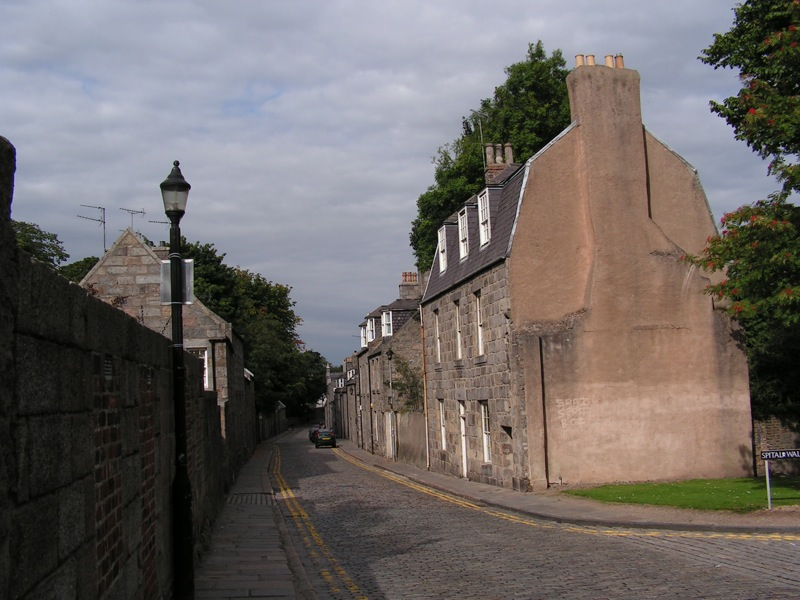
College Bounds, Old Aberdeen

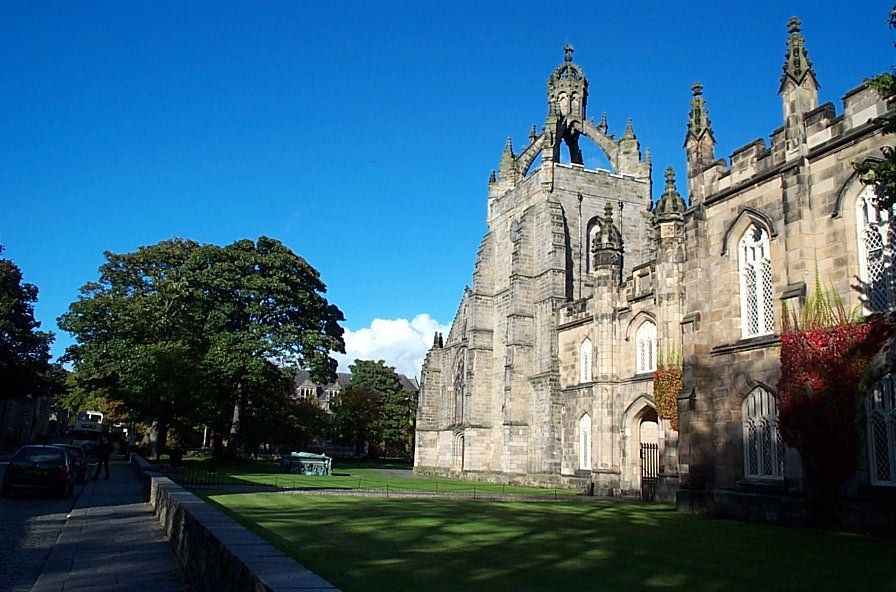
King's College, High Street, Old Aberdeen

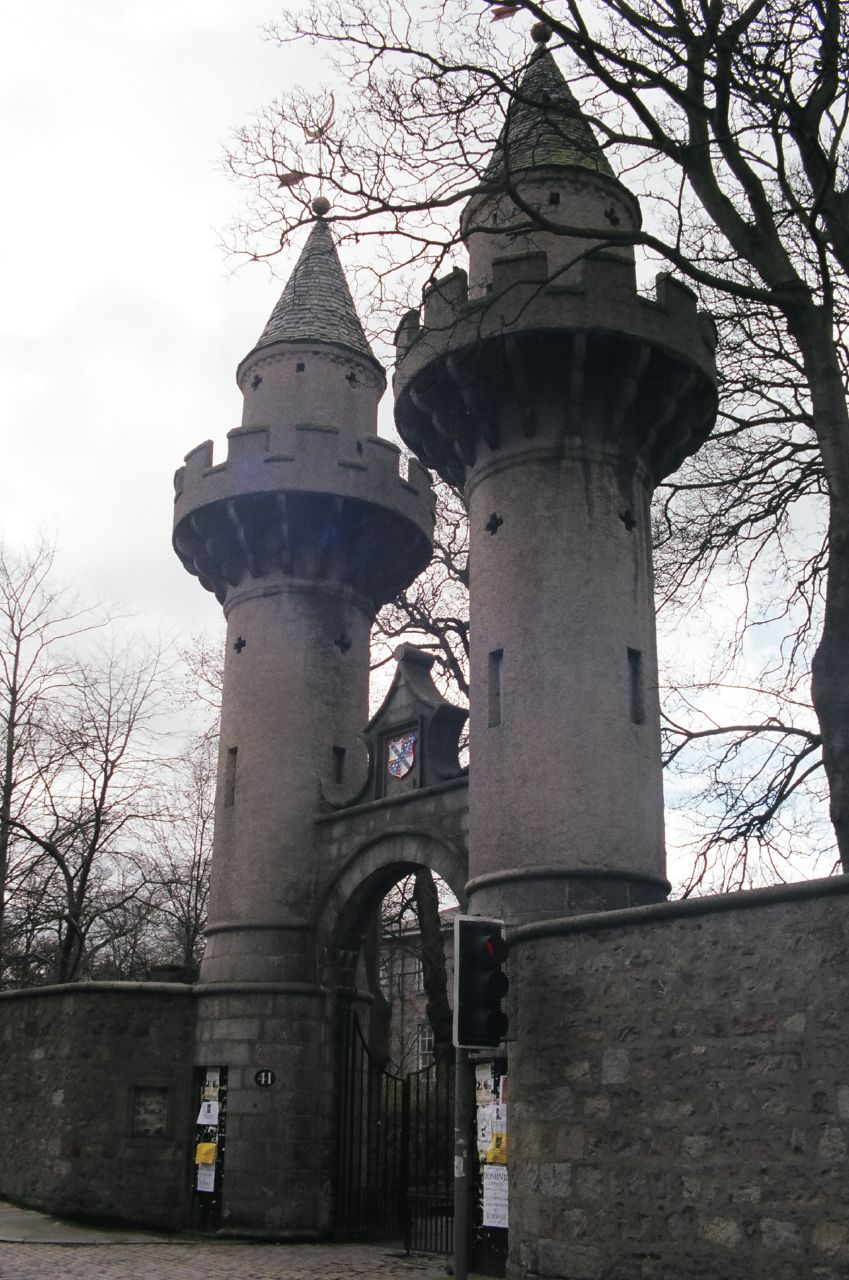
Powis Gates

Located to the north of Aberdeen city centre, Old Aberdeen was for a long time fairly isolated at the edge of the city, being followed to the north by the River Don, Seaton Park and the small Brig o' Balgownie hamlet. Since the 1960s, and the North Sea oil boom of the 1970s, however, housing development has surrounded the area, in particular with the nearby Tillydrone development.

== History ==
Old Aberdeen was an important political, ecclesiastical and cultural centre since the Late Middle Ages. It was distinct from the more commercial New Aberdeen and they remained separate cities until 1891. In the 1630s the Covenanters challenged the Doctors of Aberdeen by holding a meeting in Muchalls Castle and responding to certain letters issued by the doctors, thus setting the stage for the first battle of the Bishops' Wars, when William Keith, 7th Earl Marischal and the Marquess of Montrose led a Covenanter army of 9,000 men over the Causey Mounth to attack forces at the Bridge of Dee, effectively gaining control of Old Aberdeen.

== Character and land use ==
The central part of the old town is a conservation area rich in historical buildings, some dating to the Middle Ages, and many vernacular buildings of the 17th-early 19th centuries built in the locally ubiquitous grey granite. A notable feature of the later buildings is the early use of hand-made bricks to build up gables, top garden walls, etc.; this use of brick being rare elsewhere in Scotland before the late 19th century. A number of the streets remain paved with stone setts. There are also several university buildings from the late 20th century.

Old Aberdeen is effectively the main campus of the University of Aberdeen. There are also residential and commercial properties, but many of these are owned by the university or owned by the staff and students of the university. Additionally the area includes a small police station, a pub, a bakery, and until recently its own Post Office. To the north of the university lies St Machar's Cathedral, whose medieval ecclesiastical buildings formed the original Old Aberdeen before the University arrived in 1495.

Major historic buildings in Old Aberdeen include: the late 15th century King's College Chapel, one of two surviving Scottish medieval churches with open "crown" spires, and which has the largest surviving collection of medieval woodcarving in any Scottish building; St Machar's Cathedral itself; the recently restored Old Town House (early 18th century); and the Brig o' Balgownie (14th century), now pedestrianised, and which is a contender for the title of Scotland's oldest surviving bridge.

== Governance ==
Old Aberdeen is now fully incorporated into the Aberdeen City council area, with its local authority as Aberdeen City Council. Old Aberdeen remains a community council area within the city. For elections to Aberdeen City Council, Old Aberdeen forms part of the 'Tillydrone/ Seaton/Old Aberdeen' electoral ward, which elects three councillors. These are currently Jim Noble, Alex McLellan (both SNP), and Ross Grant (Labour)

For elections to the House of Commons in the Parliament of the United Kingdom, Old Aberdeen forms part of the Aberdeen North constituency. The current Member of Parliament (MP) for Aberdeen North is Kirsty Blackman. For elections to the Scottish Parliament, it elects a constituency member as part of the Aberdeen Central constituency. The current Member of the Scottish Parliament for Aberdeen Central is Kevin Stewart.

== Landmarks ==
=== King's College and Old Aberdeen campus ===
The iconic and renowned buildings of King's College are perhaps the dominant structures of Old Aberdeen. The College itself now finds itself surrounded by the wider Old Aberdeen campus of the University of Aberdeen which, since the decline of Marischal College, is now the main focal point of the university. The area boasts two museums, King's Museum, which features changing exhibitions from the stores of the University and the Zoology Museum, home to the natural history collection belonging to the University.

=== The Old Town House ===
The Old Town House was the original home of the Burgh's local government, completed in 1789. It was originally the centrepoint for trading in Old Aberdeen (still discernible in the widening of the street to accommodate trading booths), and the mercat cross (head late medieval, shaft more recent) stands outside it. The building is built of granite and is of restrained but elegant early Georgian design, with a fine cupola above the façade. It was acquired by the university in recent years, and was renovated in 2005. The Old Town House now houses King's Museum.

=== St Machar's Cathedral ===
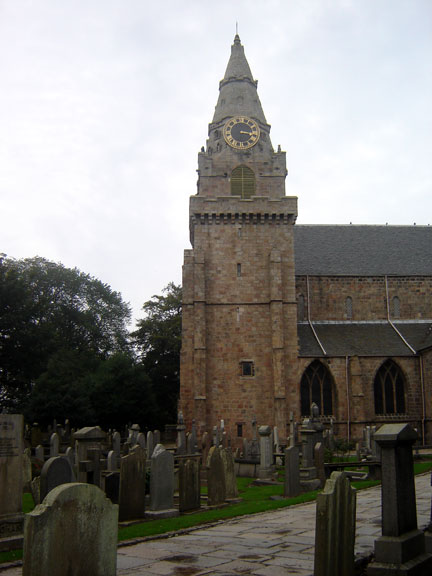
St Machar's Cathedral

The Cathedral Church of St Machar is the high kirk of Aberdeen and following the Reformation lies in the hands of the Church of Scotland.

=== Cruickshank Botanic Gardens ===
The Cruickshank Botanic Gardens were gifted to the University of Aberdeen and opened in 1898. The gardens are set over 11 acres (45,000 m^{2}) and are accessible to the public for no charge.

=== The Powis Gates ===
Just south of King's College and across the High Street lie the Powis Gates, an impressive and imposing archway with a Near Eastern influence demonstrated in its 'minaret' towers. These were erected in 1834 by Hugh Fraser Leslie of Powis, the owner of an estate which formerly lay behind them. The Fraser Leslie Arms are visible on the obverse of the arch, with a shield on the reverse showing the bust of three black men - a link to the family's involvement in a grant of freedom made to their slaves in Jamaica (or possibly impaled arms celebrating a marriage between a member of the Leslie family and a member of the Moir of Scotstoun family). The entrance now leads to the University's Crombie-Johnston and King's Postgraduate Halls of Residence.

=== Seaton Park ===
To the north boundary of Old Aberdeen lies Seaton Park, one of the city's largest open spaces. The park itself lies on the banks of the River Don. It is set over twenty-seven hectares and was purchased by the city for public use in 1947.

== Gallery ==
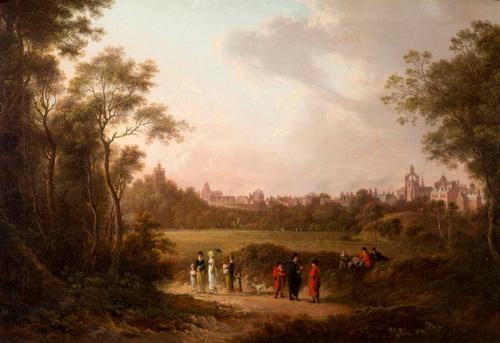
Alexander Nasmyth, Old Aberdeen, c.1808

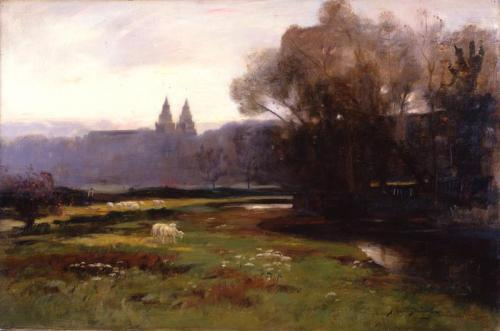
James Coutts Michie, Old Aberdeen From The South West, c.1875–1899

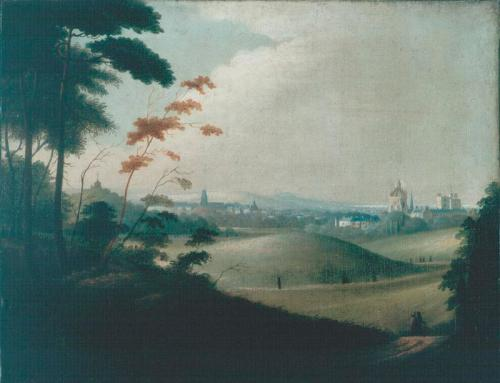
William Mosman, Old Aberdeen, c.1725–1749

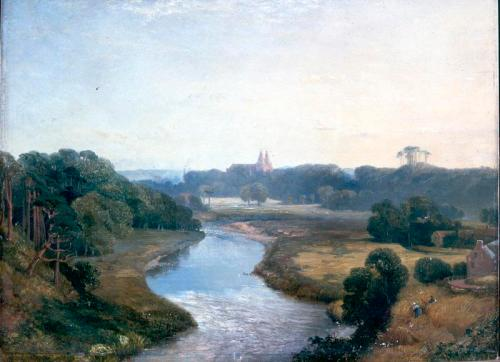
James Cassie, View of St Machar's from the River Don
