= King's Museum =

University museum in Aberdeen, Scotland

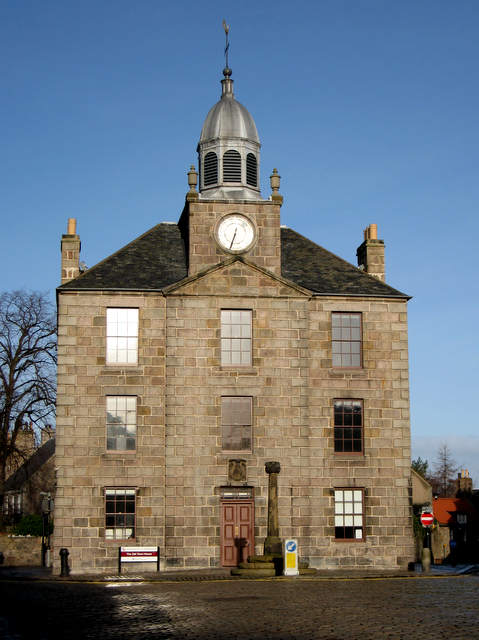
- The Old Town House
- Established: 2011
- Location: Aberdeen, Scotland
- Website: https://www.abdn.ac.uk/museums/exhibitions/kings-museum-586.php

King's Museum was a small university museum operated by the University of Aberdeen and located in the Old Town House in Old Aberdeen, Scotland.

== History ==
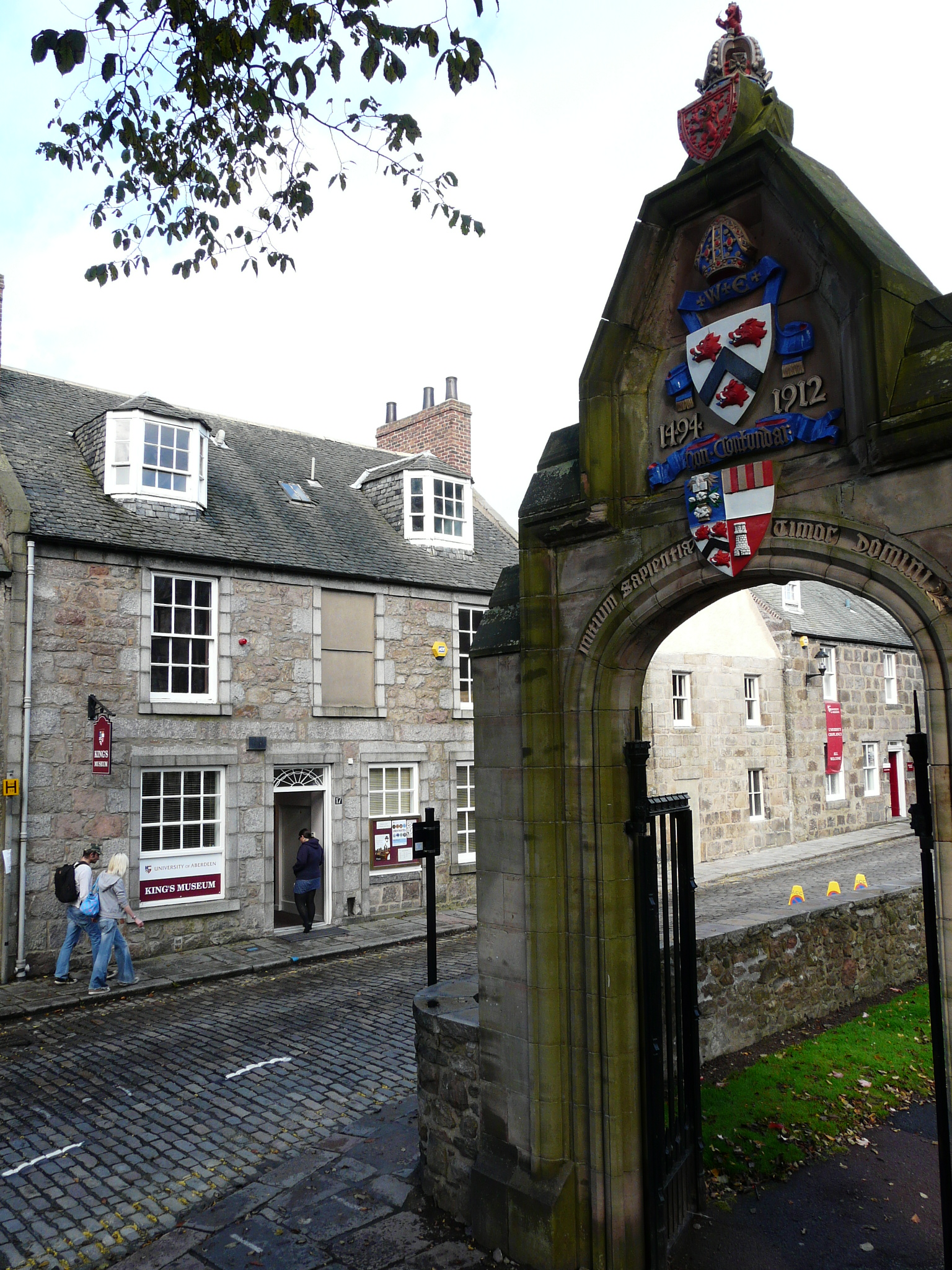
Former premises at No. 17 High Street

The University of Aberdeen's museum collections are among the largest and most important in Scotland, having been granted the status of a Recognised Collection of National Significance by Museums Galleries Scotland. The collections were originally established in King's College in 1727. They were later housed at the Marischal College building. Following the closure of the Marischal Museum in July 2008, a dedicated public museum opened at No. 17 High Street in April 2011, although the collections themselves remained at Marischal College. The public museum was relocated to the Old Town House in the High Street in 2013. The museum hosted a number of temporary exhibitions featuring a rotation of items taken from the collection at Marischal College.

The King's Museum closed in March 2020 during the Covid-19 pandemic, initially to support the public health response to the pandemic in the city of Aberdeen. Plans were floated to reopen the museum in 2022, and the Old Town House, Old Aberdeen was renovated during this time.

== Schools Service ==
The museum ran a schools service for primary school classes in the Aberdeen City council area and Aberdeenshire. Workshops were offered on a variety of topics, and all workshops linked in with the Scottish Curriculum for Excellence.

== Events ==
The museum ran an evening lecture series on Tuesdays throughout the university term time, and also participated in national and international events, such as the annual "Night at the Museums" event, part of the ICOM European Night of Museums and Museums Galleries Scotland's Festival of Museums.
