= Bettyhill =

Coordinates: 58.53°N 4.22°W

Bettyhill: Scottish Gaelic: Am Blàran Odhar
- Location within the Sutherland area
- OS grid reference: NC706618
- Council area: Highland
- Lieutenancy area: Sutherland
- Country: Scotland
- Sovereign state: United Kingdom
- Post town: THURSO
- Postcode district: KW14
- Dialling code: 01641
- Police: Scotland
- Fire: Scottish
- Ambulance: Scottish
- UK Parliament: Caithness, Sutherland and Easter Ross
- Scottish Parliament: Caithness, Sutherland and Ross

Bettyhill (Scottish Gaelic: Am Blàran Odhar) is a village in the parish of Farr, on the north coast of Scotland.

Bettyhill lies on the A836 road 32 miles (51 km) west of Thurso and 12 miles (19 km) from Tongue. It lies 5 miles (8 km) from the village of Skerray; its former fishing port was called Navermouth. To the east is Crask. It has a population of 576.

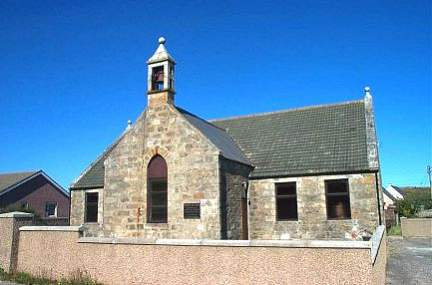
The Free Church at Bettyhill

Bettyhill's principal attractions are the expanse of Torrisdale Bay, the Strathnaver Museum and salmon fishing on the River Naver. The whole of the north-western highlands (Assynt to Cape Wrath, Loch Shin to Strath Halladale and Reay) was known as "Mackay Country" from the 13th century.

== Economy ==
The craft shop serves fish and chips on a Friday and Saturday night, as well as having a cafe ('The Cafe at Bettyhill') which is currently open seven days a week during summer months.

The Bettyhill Hotel contains the Eilean Neave restaurant. The Farr Bay Inn, built in 1819, was formerly the manse and is now a listed building. It has recently come under new management and was refurbished in 2009.

== Community Facilities ==
=== School and Leisure Centre ===
Adjoining Farr High School is the North Coast Leisure Centre which comprises a leisure pool, gym, spa and sauna and is open for public use.

=== Museum ===
The Strathnaver Museum is in the village based in the former parish church. The Strathnaver Museum, probably better known as "The Mackay Museum", has an upstairs, older & larger section devoted to the ancient Clan Mackay.

== Sports ==
Bettyhill holds an annual football competition called the Guy Cup. Teams from nearby northern areas come to compete for the trophy. This annual gathering is held in remembrance of Philip Mackay (nicknamed "Guy") who died in an oil rig accident. The medals and trophy are usually held by Guy's mother Phyllis Mackay.

== Notable people ==
- Charles MacIvor, skier
- Martin Rennie, football manager
