= Old Town House, Old Aberdeen =

Municipal building in Aberdeen, Scotland

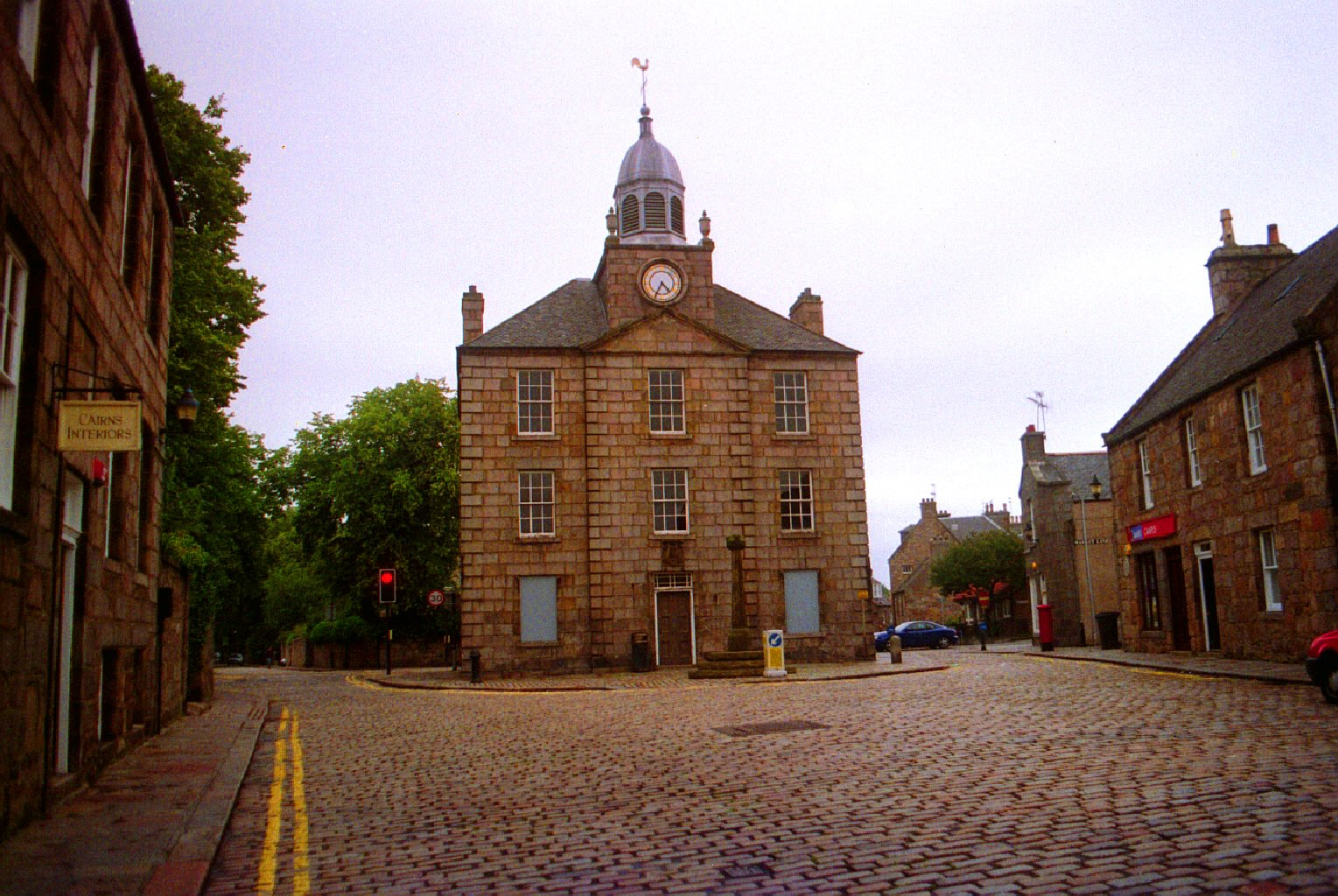
- Old Town House

- Shown in Aberdeen
- 57.1671°N 2.1022°W
- Location: High Street, Old Aberdeen

History
- Built: 1789

Site notes
- Architect: George Jaffrey
- Architectural style: Georgian style

Listed Building – Category A
- Official name: Old Aberdeen Town House, High Street, Old Aberdeen
- Designated: 12 January 1967
- Reference no.: LB19992

The Old Town House is a municipal building in the High Street in Old Aberdeen, Scotland. The structure, which is now the home of the King's Museum, is a Category A listed building.

== History ==
The burgh council of Old Aberdeen originally met in a room above the south porch of St Machar's Cathedral. After finding this arrangement inadequate, they commissioned a purpose-built town house in the High Street in 1642. It accommodated a school and a weigh-house on the ground floor and a council chamber on the first floor. It was significantly extended to the south by a new structure, which incorporated some prison cells and was surmounted by a clock tower, in 1702. Although a new water supply was added in 1769, the building was very dilapidated by the early 1780s.

Construction of the current building started in February 1788. It was designed by a local architect, George Jaffrey, in the Georgian style, built by Jaffray in granite and was completed in 1789. The design involved a symmetrical main frontage with three bays facing south down the High Street; the central bay, which slightly projected forward, featured a doorway on the ground floor, with sash windows on the first and second floors and a pediment above. Above the doorway there was a panel bearing a coat of arms which had been recovered from the previous building. The outer bays were similarly fenestrated with sash windows on all three floors. At roof level, there was a central clock tower with a square base, incorporating clock faces on all sides, and a belfry above. The bell in the belfry, which had been cast by John Mowat in 1754, was also recovered from the old building. Internally, the principal rooms were some prison cells on the ground floor, an assembly hall on the first floor, and a council chamber and a room for the local masonic lodge on the second floor.

The building continued to serve as the meeting place of the burgh council until Old Aberdeen was annexed by the City of Aberdeen in 1891. It went on to serve as a school and then as a library during the 20th century. The University of Aberdeen acquired the building from Aberdeen City Council on a peppercorn lease in 2001. The masonic lodge, which was still located in the room on the second floor, then relocated to the Old Coach House in Dunbar Street in August 2004, allowing the university to refurbish the whole building, with financial support from the Heritage Lottery Fund, in 2005.

The King's Museum, which accommodates a collection of artefacts originally assembled in King's College from 1727, relocated from No. 17 High Street where it had previously been based, into the old town house in 2013.

== Clock ==
A current clock built by John Black of Aberdeen was installed in 1836.

== See also ==
- List of listed buildings in Aberdeen/2
- List of Category A listed buildings in Aberdeen
