= Museums Galleries Scotland =

Organization

Museums Galleries Scotland (MGS), formerly the Scottish Museums Council, is the National Development Body for the museum sector in Scotland. It offers support to 400 museums and galleries, ranging from small local museums to larger regional and national museums. It is the Scottish partner in the UK Museum Accreditation Scheme.

It acts as the representative for the sector, promoting its work to the public, stakeholders and the Scottish Government. This involves speaking on behalf of the sector and showing that museums and galleries are not only custodians of Scotland's rich and diverse history, but also have a lot to contribute to modern society. Its core work involves supporting and enabling the sector to meet their objectives in a number of ways, including though strategic investment, advice, advocacy and skills development opportunities.

== See also ==
- List of museums in Scotland
