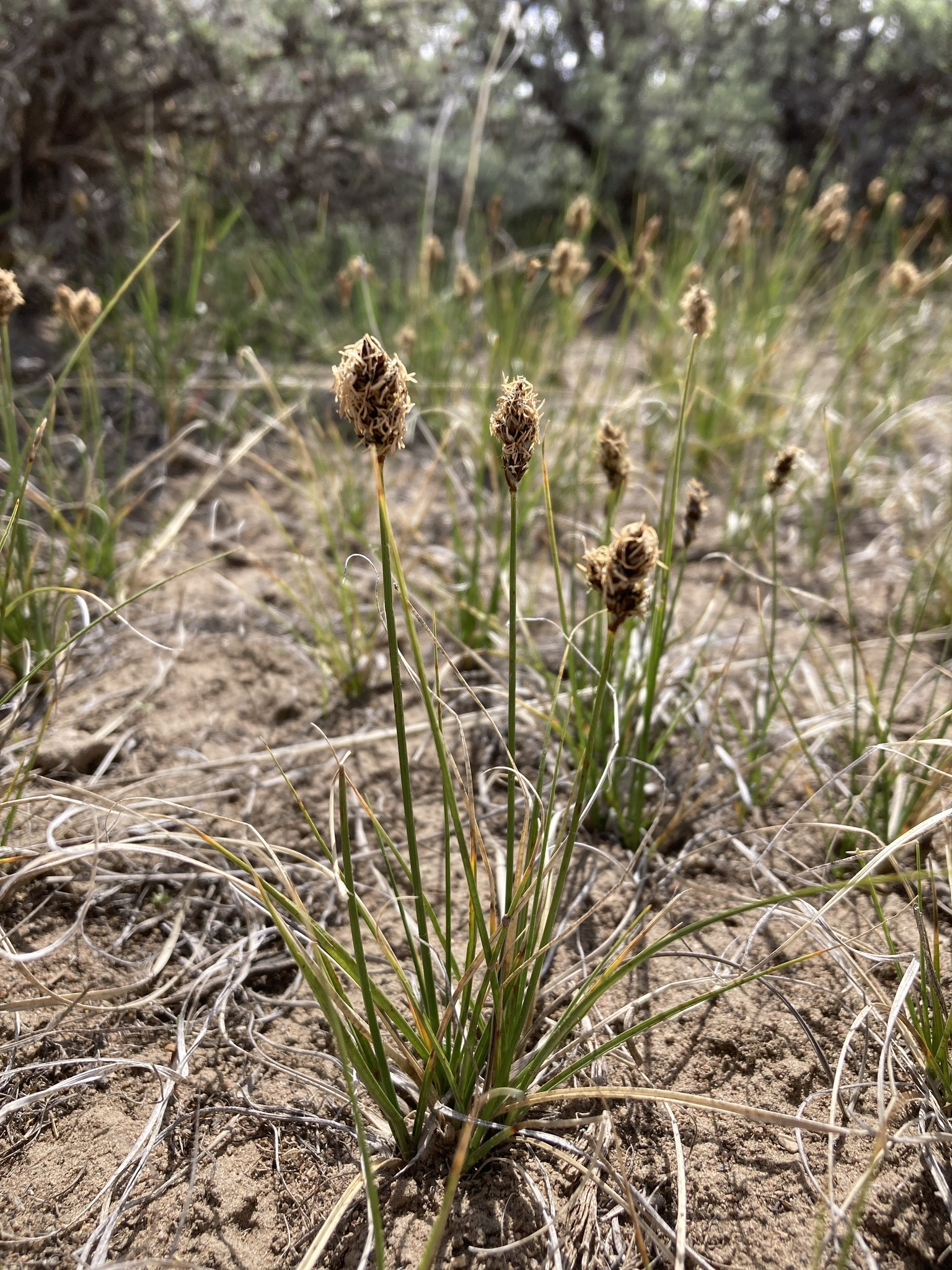
- Rolling sagebrush steppe, Uinta County, Wyoming

Conservation status
- Secure (NatureServe)

Scientific classification
- Kingdom: Plantae
- Clade: Tracheophytes
- Clade: Angiosperms
- Clade: Monocots
- Clade: Commelinids
- Order: Poales
- Family: Cyperaceae
- Genus: Carex
- Subgenus: Carex subg. Vignea
- Species: C. duriuscula

Binomial name
- Carex duriuscula C.A.Mey.

Subspecies
- C. duriuscula subsp. duriuscula; C. duriuscula subsp. rigescens

Synonyms
- Carex eleocharis; Carex rigescens; Carex sohachii; Carex stenophylla var. duriuscula; Vignea duriuscula

= Carex duriuscula =

Plant species in the family

Carex duriuscula, commonly known as needleleaf sedge, is a species of sedge that is native to both North America and Eurasia.

== Description ==
Needleleaf sedge is a herbaceous tuft forming plant. It spreads by brown rhizomes with a thickness of 0.6–1.8 millimeters, which can be quite long. Plants have a large number of small, fibrous roots. Its clums, flowering stems in grass like plants, are three sided at the base, but the corners are blunt and are quite smooth towards the top. They usually measure 10 to 35 centimeters (4 to 14 in) tall, but occasionally are as short as 6 cm (2.4 in). The clums grow from the rhizomes, either singly or a few together.

The leaves are quite narrow, just 0.5–1.5 millimeters wide with an edge that may roll inward or be flat. They are always shorter than the clums and have a slightly rough surface. The base of the leaves have sheaths that are brown to dark-brown in color that disintegrate into fibers.

The inflorescence at the top of a needleleaf sedge clum is 0.7–2 tall and half as wide if it is a pistillate, seed producing, inflorescence. A pistillate glume, the scale like bract under the spikelet, is broadly ovate or elliptic in shape and rusty-brown in color with a glassy, hyaline, white edge and tip.

== Taxonomy ==
Carex duriuscula is classified with the grass like species in the family Cyperaceae in the genus Carex, the true sedges. Within Carex it is further classified in the subgenus named Vignea. This is in turn is classified in section Divisae. A 2012 study of the genetics of Carex species classified in Vignea found that it is most closely related to Carex chordorrhiza and then to Carex douglasii and Carex potosina.

It was scientifically described and named in 1831 by the botanist Carl Anton von Meyer.

=== Subspecies ===
Two subspecies are listed as accepted by Plants of the World Online, World Flora Online, and World Plants. However, a third subspecies named stenophylloides is listed in the Flora of China.

==== Carex duriuscula subsp. duriuscula ====
The autonymic subspecies is distinguished by the inrolled edges of its leaves. This subspecies is the more widespread, growing across temperate Asia and Western North America and on the island of Papua New Guinea.

==== Carex duriuscula subsp. rigescens ====
This subspecies was given its first scientific description in 1884 as Carex stenophylla var. rigescens by Adrien René Franchet. It was described as a species in 1935 by Vitali Iwanowicz Kreczetowicz (1901-1942), but it was reclassified as a subspecies of C. duriuscula in 1990. The leaves of subspecies rigescens are flat.

=== Synonyms ===
Carex duriuscula has 12 synonyms of the species or one of its two accepted subspecies according to POWO.

Table of Synonyms
Name	Year	Rank	Synonym of:	Notes
Carex duriuscula var. interrupta Litv.	1909	variety	subsp. duriuscula	= het.
Carex duriuscula var. tenuispica X.Y.Yuan	1985	variety	subsp. duriuscula	= het.
Carex eleocharis L.H.Bailey	1889	species	subsp. duriuscula	= het.
Carex rigescens (Franch.) V.I.Krecz.	1935	species	subsp. rigescens	≡ hom.
Carex sohachii Ohwi	1942	species	subsp. duriuscula	= het.
Carex stenophylla subsp. eleocharis (L.H.Bailey) Hultén	1942	subspecies	subsp. duriuscula	= het.
Carex stenophylla subsp. rigescens (S.Yun Liang) S.Yun Liang & Y.C.Tang	1990	subspecies	subsp. rigescens	≡ hom.
Carex stenophylla var. duriuscula (C.A.Mey.) Trautv.	1888	variety	C. duriuscula	≡ hom.
Carex stenophylla var. eleocharis (L.H.Bailey) Breitung	1957	variety	subsp. duriuscula	= het.
Carex stenophylla var. humilis Meinsh.	1901	variety	subsp. duriuscula	= het.
Carex stenophylla var. rigescens Franch.	1884	variety	subsp. rigescens	≡ hom.
Vignea duriuscula (C.A.Mey.) Soják	1979	species	C. duriuscula	≡ hom.
Notes: ≡ homotypic synonym; = heterotypic synonym

=== Names ===
The species name, duriuscula, means "somewhat hard". In English it known by the common name needleleaf sedge or needle-leaved sedge. It is also called spikeletrush sedge, spikerush sedge, involute-leaved sedge, low sedge, and narrow-leaved sedge.

== Range and habitat ==
Needleleaf sedge has an extensive range from the eastern parts of European Russia through Siberia and Alaska to the Upper Midwest in the United States. There is also a disjunct population in Irian Jaya, the western part of the island of Papua New Guinea.

In China it is widespread in the north and east, but absent from the southwest and west. It also is found in Mongolia, Korea, and Kazakhstan.

In arctic and subarctic North America the species grows in Alaska and the Yukon and Northwest Territories. It also is native to the four western provinces of Canada, British Columbia, Alberta, Manitoba, and Saskatchewan. In the contiguous United States it is most common in the Rocky Mountain states and the northern states of the Great Plains. This includes Montana, North Dakota, South Dakota, western Minnesota, Wyoming, Nebraska, Colorado, and northern New Mexico. To the east it also is found in widely scattered areas of Iowa, Illinois, Missouri, and Kansas. It is also native to every western state, but only a few counties of each. For example, in California it is it grows only in the great basin province in the White and Inyo Mountains.

Its habitats include dry prairies, sagebrush grasslands, and openings in dry forests. In North America it can grow at elevations of 300–3,300 meters (980–10,830 ft), but in China it usually grows from 200–700 meters (660–2,300 ft) and rarely may be found as low as 100 m (330 ft).

== Ecology ==
In Buryatia, Russia a study of pastures in the Barguzin Valley found that intensive grazing by livestock has caused the steppe pasture to become dominated by needleleaf sedge and fringed sagebrush (Artemisia frigida).
