= Inshlampie Broch =

Broch of Inshlampie
- Location in Sutherland, Scotland
- 58°23′19″N 4°11′53″W
- Type: Broch
- Periods: Iron Age, Roman
- Location: Sutherland

Broch of Inshlampie is an Iron Age broch in Scotland.

== Location ==
Located in Farr, Sutherland, this possible broch is situated in a highly defensible position overlooking the river Naver. Ravines flank Inshalampie to the north and south.

Inshlampie broch is situated in a rich archaeological landscape; Skaill chambered cairn is across the Naver river and a burial ground is situated north of the cairn. Along the Inshlampie burn are hut circles and south of the broch are settlement ruins.

== Description ==
No chambers are visible in the remains of this broch, though it is presumed that the entrance is located on the west-north-west side. The approximate external diameter of this possible broch is 15.5 metres, with an internal diameter of 6.5 metres. In the early 20th century AD the walls were preserved up to a height of 1.2 metres, though this had decreased significantly over time so that by the mid 1980s very little of the broch remained visible.

The remains of other structures were visible on the terraced land between the west side of the broch and the river, and on the east side of the broch was another terrace that may have been bordered by a ditch that was situated across the promontory. Traces of enclosures can be seen to the south and east of the broch mound and there are further traces of a large wall at the foot of the outer slope. Without the current tree cover, the Langdale Broch 4 kilometers to the south-west would be visible.
