= Syre, Scotland =

Coordinates: 58.36405°N 4.23576°W

Syre: Scottish Gaelic: Saghair
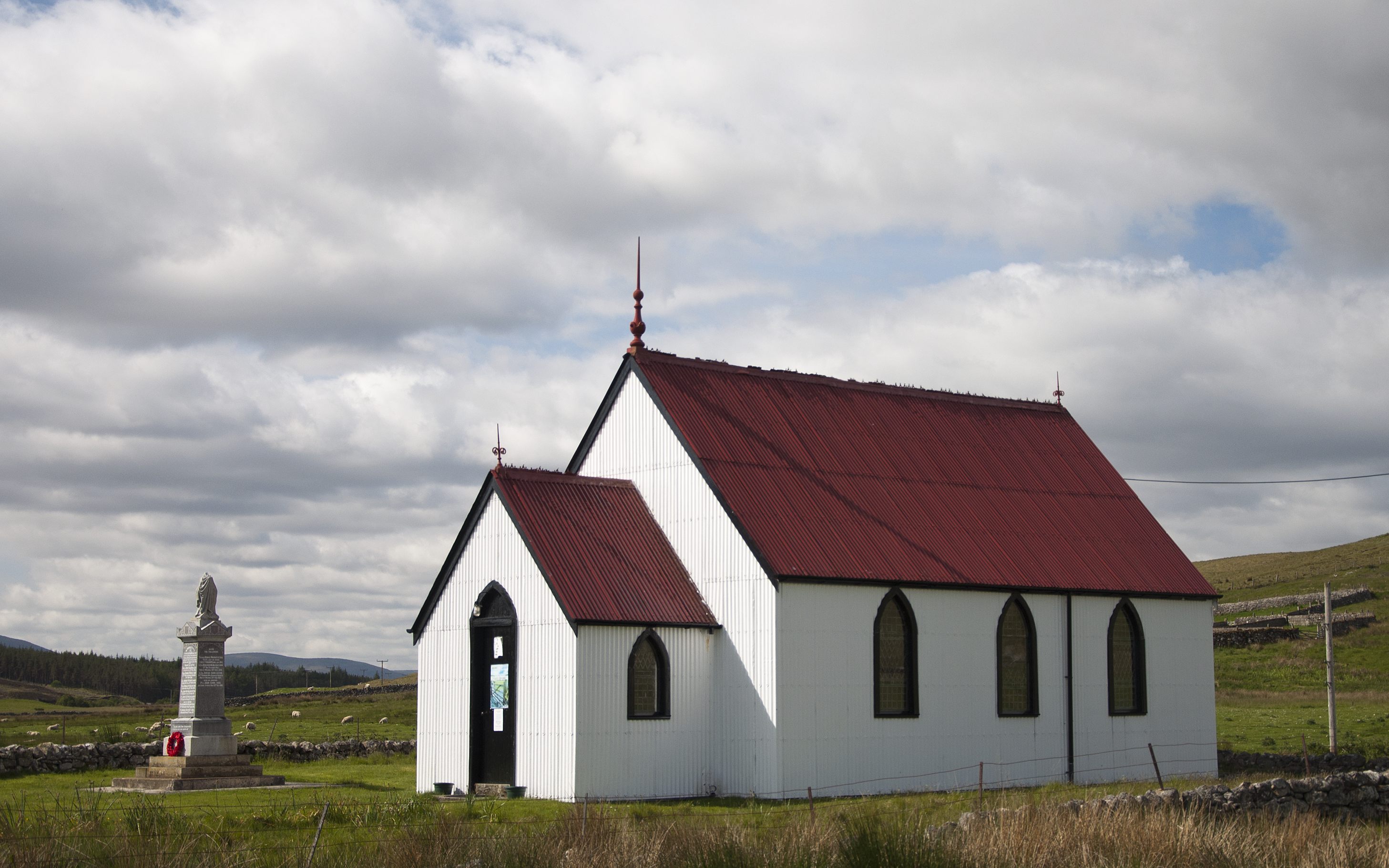
- The 19th century church in Syre

- Location within the Sutherland area
- OS grid reference: NC693439
- Council area: Highland
- Lieutenancy area: Sutherland
- Country: Scotland
- Sovereign state: United Kingdom
- Postcode district: KW11 6

Syre (Scottish Gaelic: Saghair) is a small settlement, located within Strath Naver, Sutherland in the Scottish Highlands.

Notable buildings in Syre include a tin church built in the late 19th century and a farmhouse known as "Patrick Sellar's House". Closeby are the ruins of the clearance village of Rosal.
