= Andy Nisbet =

Scottish mountaineer (1953-2019)

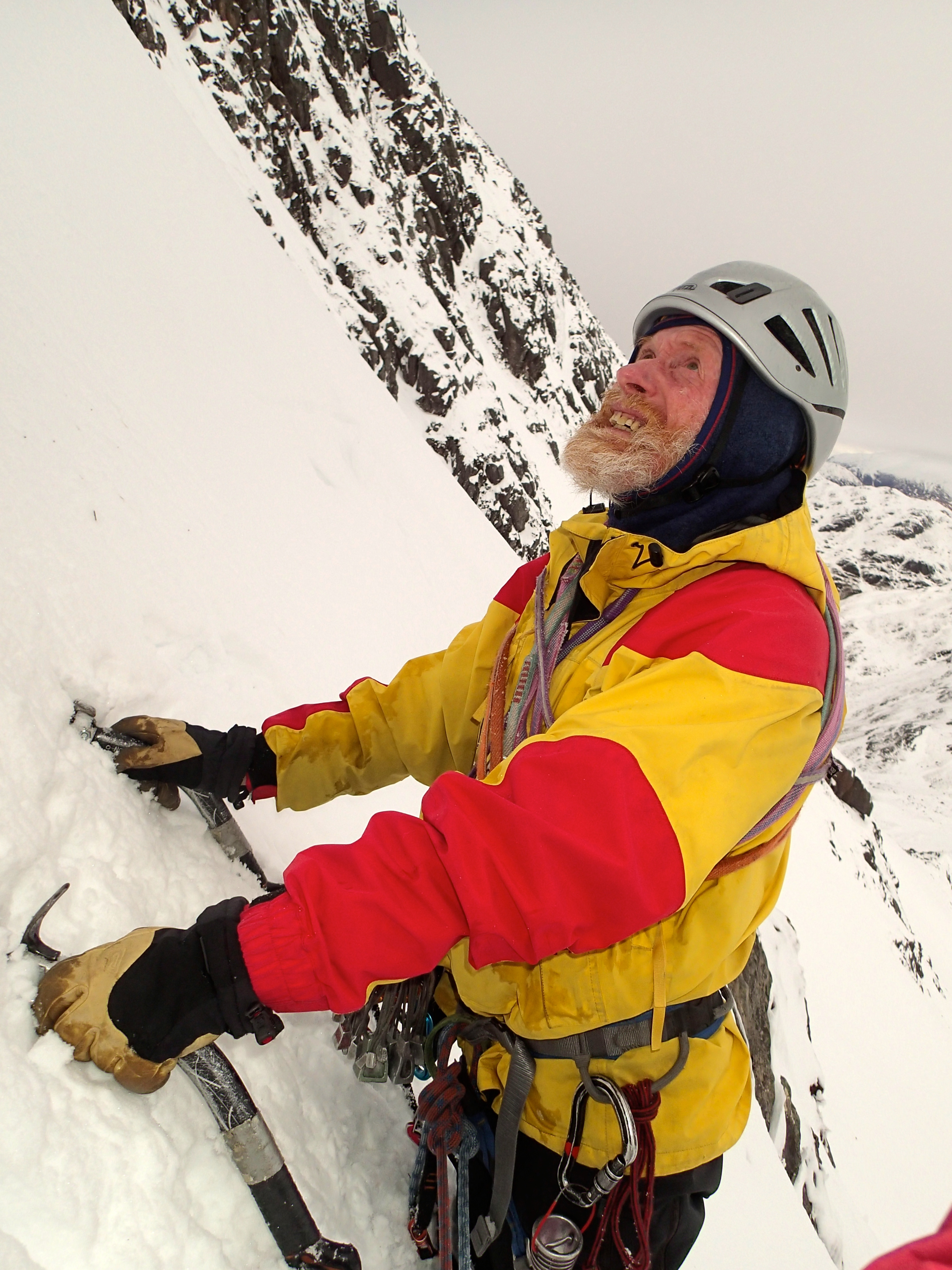

Personal information
- Born: 22 May 1953 Aberdeen, Scotland
- Died: 5 February 2019 (aged 65) Ben Hope, Scotland
- Education: Aberdeen Grammar School University of Aberdeen
- Occupations: mountain guide and instructor

Climbing career
- Type of climber: Scottish winter (mixed snow, rock and ice)
- Known for: new Scottish winter climbing routes; climbing guidebook writer; pioneer of mixed rock and ice climbing

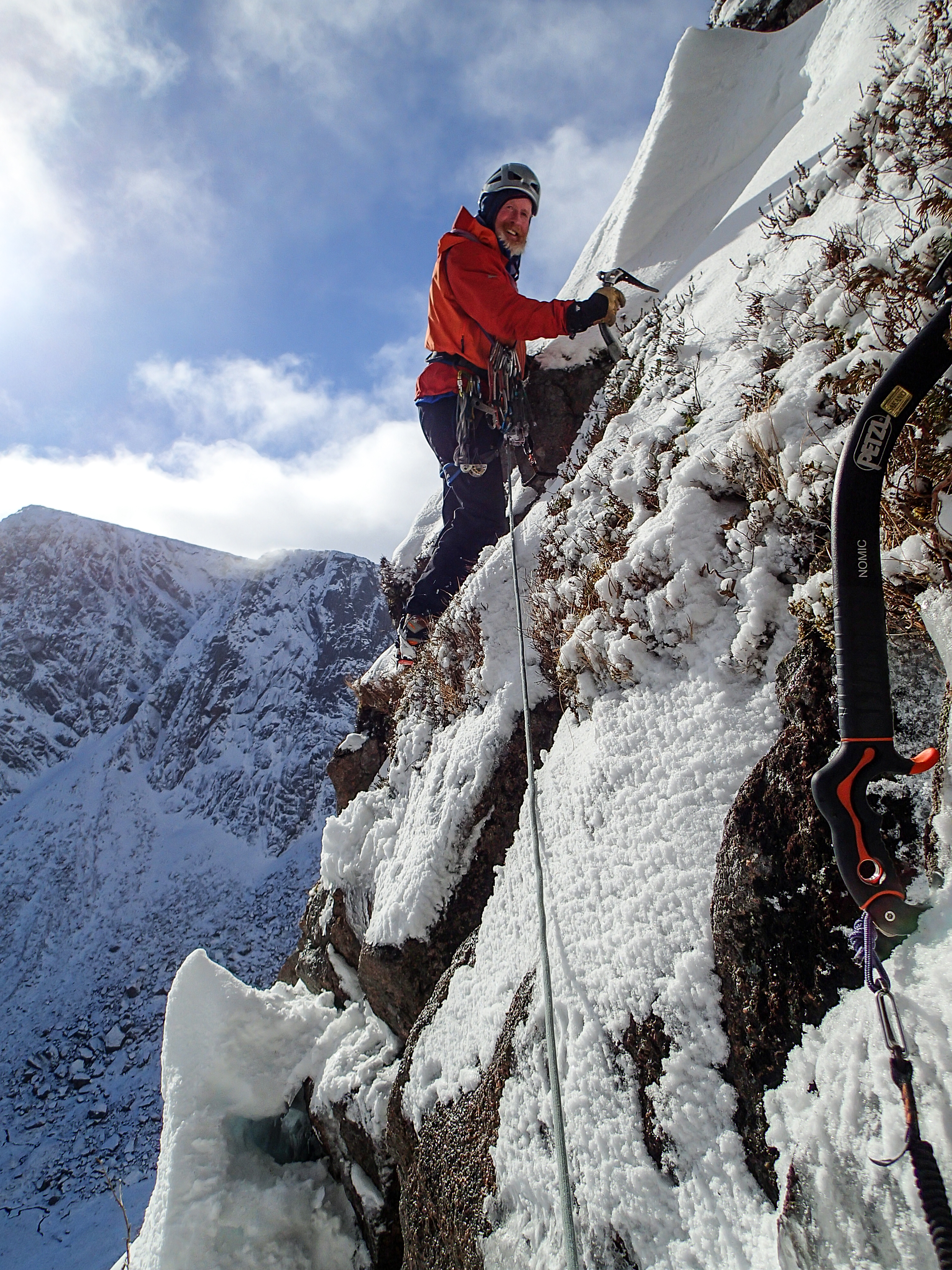
Andy Nisbet on Stag Rocks, March 2016)

Andrew Nisbet (22 May 1953 – 5 February 2019) was a Scottish mountaineer, mountain guide, climbing instructor, and editor of climbing guidebooks. Regarded as a pioneer of mixed rock and ice climbing techniques, he built a 45-year reputation as an innovator by developing over 1,000 new winter climbing routes in Scotland, of which 150 were at Grade V, or above.

Nisbet began hill walking in Aberdeen as a youngster, and was the second youngest person at the time to summit all 280 Scottish Munros. Nicknamed "The Honey Monster", he was married to accomplished climber Gillian Elizabeth Nisbet, with whom he established over 40 routes, until her death in 2006. He died at age 65 in 2019 with friend and climbing partner Steve Perry, whilst attempting a new winter route on Ben Hope.

He was described as "The most experienced winter climber of his generation", and "The most active prolific mountaineer that Scotland has ever produced". He was a president of the Scottish Mountaineering Club, and was awarded the 'Scottish Award for Excellence in Mountain Culture' in 2014.

== Early climbing life ==
Nisbet was introduced to hill-walking by his parents whilst still a primary school child in Aberdeen. This activity was further encouraged when he moved to Aberdeen Grammar School in the 1960s. By the time he was nineteen he had climbed all of the Munros (i.e. all c.280 of the Scottish summits over 3,000 ft (914 m)) and was the second youngest person ever to have climbed them all at that time. It was the need to reach the top of the Inaccessible Pinnacle on Skye as one of his last Munros that led to Nisbet's introduction to rock climbing. When he was 20 he went on a rock climbing course and then a winter climbing course at Glenmore Lodge.

At this time Nisbet was at the University of Aberdeen where he took a degree in biology, followed by a PhD and then three years of post-doctorate hospital work. He gave up work in 1982 to allow him to spend more time climbing, taking short-term jobs to see him through. In 1985 he went on an expedition to Everest led by Mal Duff. Although the expedition was unsuccessful in its attempt on the north east ridge, it led to an offer of seasonal employment at Glenmore Lodge in both summer 1985 and 1986. He continued to work there as an instructor until 2008.

== Legacy ==
Andy Nisbet has been described as a 'pioneer' of winter climbing because of his development in the 1980s of techniques of using modern ice-climbing equipment to climb steep mixed ground of both rock and ice – a process known as 'torqueing'. This led to a significant jump in overall Scottish winter climbing standards, and one which he personally maintained over the next few decades.

Nisbet compiled and edited a number of definitive climbing guidebooks to various regions of the Scottish mountains. He also served a spell as president of the Scottish Mountaineering Club from 2010 to 2012, as well as serving as the 'new routes editor' for the SMC Journal.

Between the 1980s and 2019, Nisbet developed more than a thousand new winter climbing routes in Scotland, and it has been calculated that, of the 600 Scottish winter climbing routes graded at V or more, he was associated with the first ascent of 150 of them, and that his climbing legacy has surpassed that of 1960's Scottish climber Tom Patey. In recent years, he and his climbing partner, Steve Perry, had been developing many new winter climbing routes on Ben Hope, Britain's most northerly Munro.

== Notable ascents ==
=== Selected first winter ascents in Scotland ===
- Vertigo Wall, Creag an Dubh-Loch, Cairngorms (Grade VII, 7) First winter ascent (with aid), December 1977. First free ascent, November 1985.
- Poacher's Fall, Liathach, (Grade V, 5) February 1978.
- Der Riesenwand, Coire nan Fhamhair, Beinn Bhan, (Grade VII, 6) 1980.
- Goliath, Creag an Dubh-Loch, Cairngorms, 1980.
- The Needle, Shelterstone Crag, Cairngorms, (Grade VIII, 8) 1985.
- The Link Face, Black Spout Pinnacle, Lochnagar. (Grade VII,7) 1988.
- Blood, Sweat and Frozen Tears, West Central Wall, Benn Eighe, (Grade VIII, 8) 1993.
- Hot Lips, Garb Choire Mor, Braeriach (Grade VI, 7) 1994.
- Mort, Lochnagar (Grade IX, 9) First winter ascent, January 2000.
- Moss Ghyll, Lower Corrie Lice, Foinaven (Grade IV, 5) February 2003.
- Bell's Direct Route, Black Pinnacle, Coire Bhrochain, Braeriach (Grade V, 6) 2003.

With over 1000 first winter routes to his name, the British Mountaineering Council described Nisbet as "the most active prolific mountaineer that Scotland has ever produced".

=== Beyond Scotland ===
Between 1989 and 2008, Nisbet was employed by Martin Moran as a mountaineering guide on at least five Himalayan mountaineering expeditions, and participated in other Himalayan trips which achieved new routes.

Nisbet was born and lived in Aberdeen. He met his wife to be, Gill, in 1991 whilst he was leading a Himalayan trekking expedition to Ramdung Go. They were married in 1993 and settled in Boat of Garten near Aviemore. As a climbing partnership they established over 40 new mountaineering routes up to E3 on rock, and up to Grade V in winter. His wife died in 2006.

He acquired various nicknames from the climbing community during his life, including 'The Honey Monster' – for his unkempt ginger hair and bearded appearance that resembled the Sugar Puffs mascot – and 'The Droid', some say for his ungainly climbing style, others because he would progress through unconsolidated snow in a machine-like fashion.

== Honours and awards ==
Nisbet was given the 'Scottish Award for Excellence in Mountain Culture' at the 2014 Fort William Mountain Festival.

== Death ==
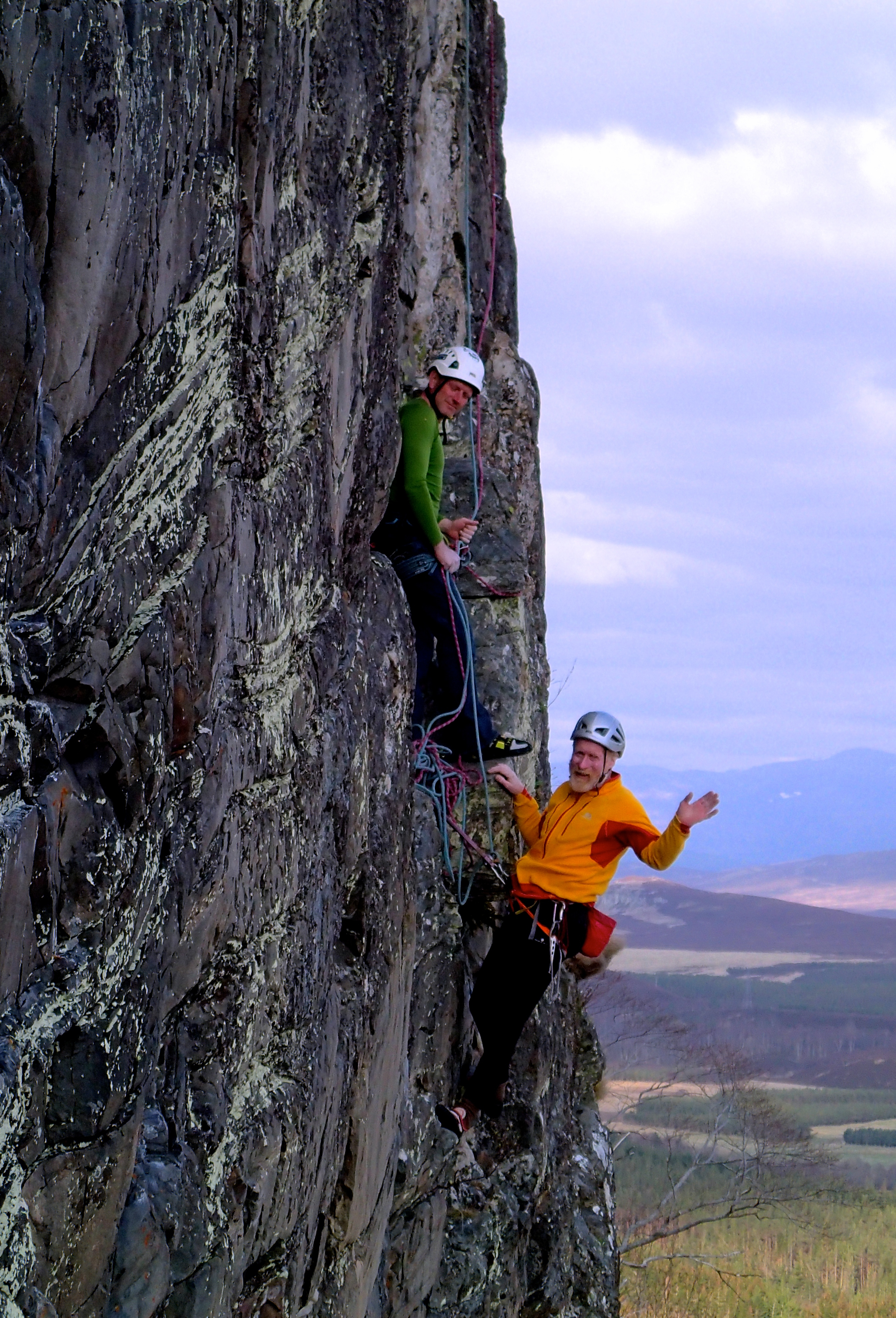
Climbing partners: Steve Perry and Andy Nisbet on Strapadicktaemi, Creag Dubh, Newtonmore, 2015.

Nisbet was killed in a winter mountaineering accident on Scotland's most northerly Munro, Ben Hope, on 5 February 2019. His body, together with that of fellow experienced climber Steve Perry, was recovered by Assynt Mountain Rescue Team from the north-west side of the mountain. They were developing new winter climbing routes on the mountain. They were believed to have completed a new route and were roped together whilst moving across the upper reaches of the mountain. Nisbet was described by one RAF mountain rescue team leader speaking after his death as "the most experienced winter climber of his generation... who had set new standards for mountaineering. Together, the two men had built up a formidable partnership in mapping new climbing routes."

== Selected publications ==
- The Cairngorms, Andy Nisbet, Allen Fyffe, Simon Richardson, Wilson Moir, John Lyall (eds), Scottish Mountaineering Club Climbers' Guide, Scottish Mountaineering Club (2007) ISBN 9780907521969
- Highland Outcrops South, Andy Nisbet (ed.), Scottish Mountaineering Club Climbers' Guide, Scottish Mountaineering Trust, May 2016 ISBN 9781907233227
- Northern Highlands North, Andy Nisbet (ed.), 2004 ISBN 0 907521 80 0
- Northern Highlands South, Andy Nisbet (ed.), Scottish Mountaineering Club Climbers' Guide, Scottish Mountaineering Trust, 2007 ISBN 9780907521976
- Scottish Rock Climbs, Andrew Nisbet (ed.), Scottish Mountaineering Club Climbers' Guide, Scottish Mountaineering Trust, 2005 ISBN 9780907521860
- Scottish Sport Climbs, Andy Nisbet (ed.), Scottish Mountaineering Club, 2013 ISBN 9781907233159
- Scottish Winter Climbs, Andrew Nisbet, Rab Anderson (eds), Scottish Mountaineering Trust, 1996 ISBN 0907521479
- Scottish Winter Climbs, Andrew Nisbet, Rab Anderson, Simon Richardson (eds), Scottish Mountaineering Trust, 2008 ISBN 9780907521983

== See also ==
- Dave MacLeod, leading Scottish climber of the 2000s
