= Rosal, Sutherland =

Coordinates: 58°20′41″N 4°14′34″W

Rosal
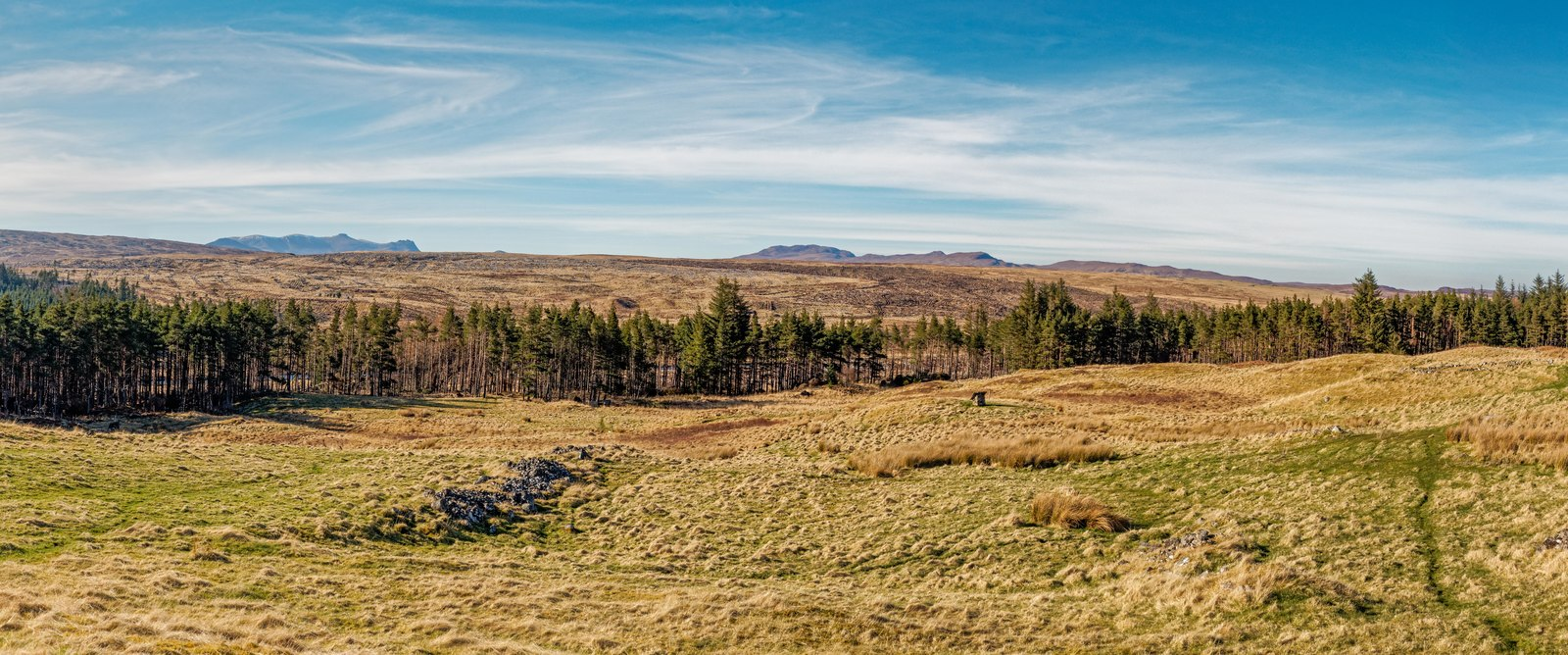
- Site of the Rosal Township

- Location within the Highland council area
- Council area: Highland
- Country: Scotland
- Sovereign state: United Kingdom

Rosal was a township in Strathnaver, Sutherland, in the Scottish Highlands that was deserted after its residents were evicted during the Highland Clearances of the early 19th century.

== Town ==
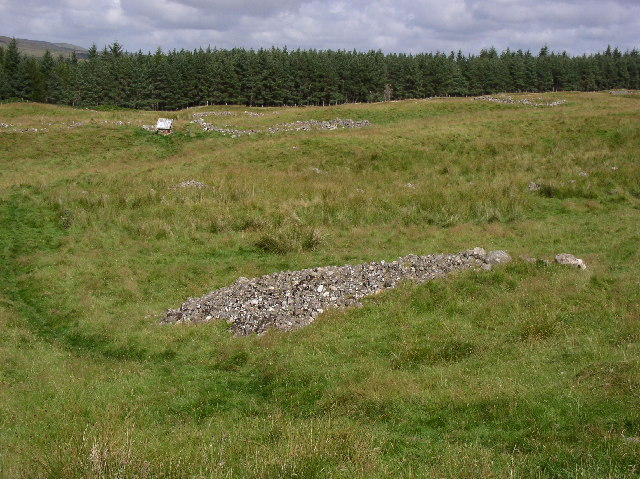
Ruins of the souterrain in Rosal

Rosal consists of approximately 80 acres (32 ha), enclosed by a ring dyke on the east side the River Naver, across a bridge from Syre. Written records of the settlement go back to 1269, but an iron age souterrain was found in the middle of the town, suggesting that it had been occupied for much longer.

Before the clearance it was the largest of 49 townships in Strathnaver. An archeological survey conducted in 1962 found the remains of 70 buildings including longhouses, byre dwellings, barns, outhouses and corn-drying kilns.

== Clearance ==
In 1813 Patrick Sellar, a factor (land manager) to Elizabeth Leveson-Gower, Duchess of Sutherland, obtained the lease for a "new sheep farm" which consisted of many townships in Strathnaver, and the existing tenants were told that they would have to leave their homes and the farmland that provided their livelihood.

The residents did organise a competing bid for the tenancy, but they were not successful.

Rosal became completely deserted by 1818.

== Legacy ==
Rosal is well known in part because one of the evicted residents, Donald MacLeod, wrote a series of letters about his experiences to the Edinburgh Chronicle newspaper in 1840, which were published as a book titled Gloomy Memories. A cairn was built across the river from Rosal in memory of MacLeod known as the Gloomy Memories Memorial.

In 1962, Horace Fairhurst, an archeologist from Glasgow University conducted an excavation at Rosal; three years later in 1965 the site was declared a historic monument. It is currently owned and maintained by Forestry and Land Scotland, and is a tourist attraction with wooden walkways erected for visitors.

== See also ==
- List of clearance settlements in Scotland
