= Strathmore, Sutherland =

Valley in Sutherland, Scotland

Coordinates: 58.371°N 4.639°W

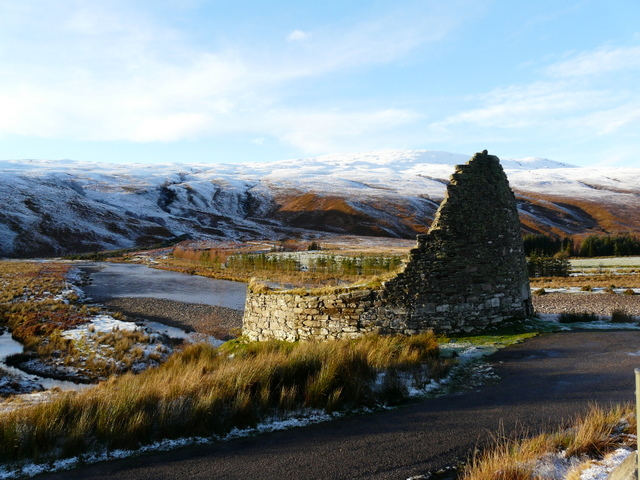
Dun Dornaigil Broch in Strathmore

Strathmore (Scottish Gaelic: An Srath Mòr) is a strath or wide valley in Sutherland in northern Scotland. The strath is in the parish of Durness to the south-east of Loch Eriboll. It runs north–south and has a minor road running alongside the Strathmore River which flows along the valley floor northwards into Loch Hope. Ben Hope is to the east.

Strathmore is best known for being the birthplace of the Scottish Gaelic poet, Rob Donn at Aultnacaillich and for Dun Dornaigil, an Iron Age broch standing up to 6.7 metres (22 ft) high. The strath is sparsely populated, the area having been cleared of most settlement in the early 19th century.

Strathmore lies at the western edge of the Ben Hope Site of Special Scientific Interest. The Strathmore river is a salmon and trout fishery and provides spawning grounds for both fish.
