= List of clearance settlements in Scotland =

This article is a list of any town, village, hamlet and settlements in Scotland, that were cleared during the 18th and 19th centuries as part of the Highland Clearances. The Clearances were a complex series of events occurring over more than a hundred years.

== Areas ==
- Assistiant, Sutherland (1812)
- Strathnaver, Sutherland (1814-1819)

== Villages ==
- Arichonan, Argyll
- Badbea, Caithness
- Loch Duntelchaig, Inverness-shire
- Peanmeanach, Lochaber
- Aoineadh Mòr (Inniemore), Morven
- Auliston, Morven
- Achanlochy, Sutherland
- Ceannabeinne, Sutherland
- Clyne, Sutherland, 1812
- Grummore, Sutherland
- Glencalvie, Sutherland
- Kildonan, Sutherland, 1812
- Lairg, Sutherland
- Poulouriscaig, Sutherland
- Rosal, Sutherland
- Strathbrora, Sutherland
- Glenelg, Lochalsh, 1849
- Carnoch, Ross and Cromarty

== Islands ==
- Berneray, North Uist.
- Riasg Buidhe, Isle of Colonsay
- Ormaig, Ulva Isle of Mull
- Crackaig, Isle of Mull
- Gualacholish, Isle of Mull
- Shiaba, Isle of Mull
- Hallaig, Isle of Raasay
- Screapadal, Isle of Raasay
- Stiomrabhaig, Isle of Lewis
- Boreraig, Isle of Skye
- Dalavil, Isle of Skye
- Lorgill, Isle of Skye
- Keppoch, Isle of Skye
- Suisnish, Isle of Skye
- Tusdale, Isle of Skye
- Fuaigh Mòr, Outer Hebrides
- Quandale, Rousay
- Westness, Rousay
