= Altnaharra =

Hamlet in the Highlands, Scotland

Coordinates: 58.28°N 4.45°W

Altnaharra: Scottish Gaelic: Allt na h-Eirbhe
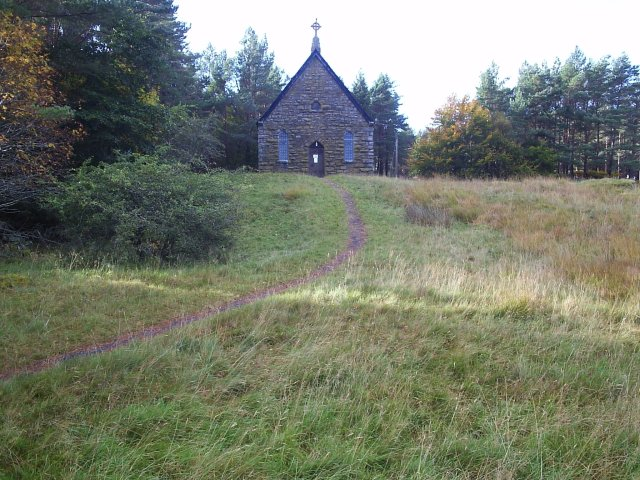
- Altnaharra Church

- Location within the Sutherland area
- OS grid reference: NC567352
  - Edinburgh: 168 mi (270 km)
  - London: 498 mi (801 km)
- Council area: Highland
- Lieutenancy area: Sutherland
- Country: Scotland
- Sovereign state: United Kingdom
- Post town: LAIRG
- Postcode district: IV27
- Dialling code: 01549
- Police: Scotland
- Fire: Scottish
- Ambulance: Scottish
- UK Parliament: Caithness, Sutherland and Easter Ross
- Scottish Parliament: Caithness, Sutherland and Ross

Altnaharra (Scottish Gaelic: Allt na h-Eirbhe) is a small hamlet in Sutherland in the Highland region of northern Scotland. The hamlet is on the A836 road, close to its junction with the B873. The nearest villages are Lairg and Tongue. Lochs in the area include Loch Naver and Loch Eriboll.

The name Altnaharra is derived from the Scottish Gaelic Allt na h-Eirbhe, meaning Stream at the boundary wall. This is named after a stream that flows through the hamlet.

Altnaharra is one of only two British locations where the string sedge plant can be found. The area north of the hamlet has been designated a site of special scientific interest for its internationally important range of wetland vegetation.

== Buildings ==
Altnaharra is famous for the Altnaharra Hotel, which opened in 1820 and quickly became a popular place for anglers to stay while visiting nearby lochs. The hotel was also popular with mountain climbers; it generally closes for winter and re-opens in March. Ben Hope and Ben Klibreck are two mountains in the immediate area of the hamlet.

Altnaharra parish church was built between 1854 and 1857 by Hugh Mackay as a Free Church. It subsequently became part of the Church of Scotland, but no regular services are presently conducted in the building. Altnaharra is now part of the parish of Altnaharra and Farr, served by the church at Strathnaver.

== Climate ==
Altnaharra has a Met Office weather station. The village's northerly latitude and inland location mean that in winter, it is often featured in the daily weather extremes in the United Kingdom. It is unusual in that the coldest month of the year is normally December. On 30 December 1995, the UK's lowest recorded temperature −27.2 °C (−17.0 °F) was measured there. This matched recordings at Braemar in the Grampians on 11 February 1895 and on 10 January 1982. In a Parliamentary debate on the Spring Statement on 23 March 2022, local MP Jamie Stone said, "The village of Altnaharra in my constituency is the coldest place in the UK every single winter."

On 20 March 2009, it was recorded as the warmest place in the UK, at 18.5 °C (65.3 °F), which was the station's warmest recorded March temperature and possibly the first time the station had recorded the warmest UK temperature. The station also reported the equal warmest national temperature of 12.3 °C (54.1 °F), with Tain on 20 January 2020. On 19 June 2020, the station had both the warmest temperature, 22.2 °C (72.0 °F), and the coldest temperature, 7.6 °C (45.7 °F), reported anywhere in the United Kingdom on that day. The March 2009 temperature was beaten on 25 March 2017 when the station recorded 19.7 °C (67.5 °F). Also on 26 May 2017, the station recorded its highest May temperature of 28.0 °C (82.4 °F), beating the previous 27.4 °C (81.3 °F) recorded on 27 May 2012. On 8 January 2010, the temperature dipped to −22.3 °C (−8.1 °F), the coldest temperature recorded in the UK since 1995. On 3 November 2015 the warmest November temperature of 16.1 °C (61.0 °F) was reached, followed by 15.6 °C (60.1 °F) on 17 December 2015 being the warmest December temperature on record at the weather station. On 25 January 2016, the highest January temperature of 13.9 °C (57.0 °F) was reached, being surpassed on 28 January 2024. On 24 September 2020, Altnaharra reported −5.0 °C (23.0 °F) which was the lowest reported September temperature at this station, as well as being the coldest in the UK since 1997.

Altnaharra has an oceanic climate (Cfb) with short, mild summers and long, cool winters. Precipitation occurs regularly year round.

Climate data for Altnaharra (81 m or 266 ft asl, averages 1991–2020)
Month	Jan	Feb	Mar	Apr	May	Jun	Jul	Aug	Sep	Oct	Nov	Dec	Year
Record high °C (°F)	16.8 (62.2)	13.6 (56.5)	19.7 (67.5)	24.5 (76.1)	28.0 (82.4)	28.4 (83.1)	30.1 (86.2)	29.2 (84.6)	25.3 (77.5)	21.7 (71.1)	16.1 (61.0)	15.6 (60.1)	30.1 (86.2)
Mean daily maximum °C (°F)	6.5 (43.7)	7.0 (44.6)	8.6 (47.5)	11.4 (52.5)	14.3 (57.7)	16.2 (61.2)	18.0 (64.4)	17.8 (64.0)	15.9 (60.6)	12.3 (54.1)	8.9 (48.0)	6.5 (43.7)	12.0 (53.6)
Daily mean °C (°F)	3.1 (37.6)	3.3 (37.9)	4.7 (40.5)	6.9 (44.4)	9.2 (48.6)	11.8 (53.2)	13.8 (56.8)	13.6 (56.5)	11.6 (52.9)	8.5 (47.3)	5.3 (41.5)	2.9 (37.2)	7.9 (46.2)
Mean daily minimum °C (°F)	−0.3 (31.5)	−0.5 (31.1)	0.8 (33.4)	2.4 (36.3)	4.2 (39.6)	7.4 (45.3)	9.6 (49.3)	9.3 (48.7)	7.3 (45.1)	4.7 (40.5)	1.8 (35.2)	−0.6 (30.9)	3.9 (39.0)
Record low °C (°F)	−22.3 (−8.1)	−25.0 (−13.0)	−21.7 (−7.1)	−10.0 (14.0)	−6.4 (20.5)	−3.1 (26.4)	−1.0 (30.2)	−2.0 (28.4)	−5.0 (23.0)	−9.7 (14.5)	−22.1 (−7.8)	−27.2 (−17.0)	−27.2 (−17.0)
Average precipitation mm (inches)	139.9 (5.51)	110.8 (4.36)	99.1 (3.90)	76.4 (3.01)	71.7 (2.82)	63.0 (2.48)	62.4 (2.46)	75.1 (2.96)	92.3 (3.63)	130.9 (5.15)	128.9 (5.07)	136.1 (5.36)	1,186.4 (46.71)
Average precipitation days (≥ 1.0 mm)	19.8	17.9	17.8	15.1	13.9	13.0	13.0	14.2	14.9	18.8	19.0	19.3	196.6
Mean monthly sunshine hours	28.8	61.1	107.5	132.3	171.9	128.4	128.6	122.3	101.7	71.5	37.9	20.3	1,112.2
Source 1: Met Office
Source 2: En.tutiempo

== Notable people ==
- Linda Norgrove (1974–2010), kidnapped by the Taliban in Afghanistan, and killed by a US grenade during a rescue effort, was born in Altnaharra.
