= Highland Railway Loch Class =

Class of 18 British 4-4-0 locomotives

Highland Railway Loch or B class
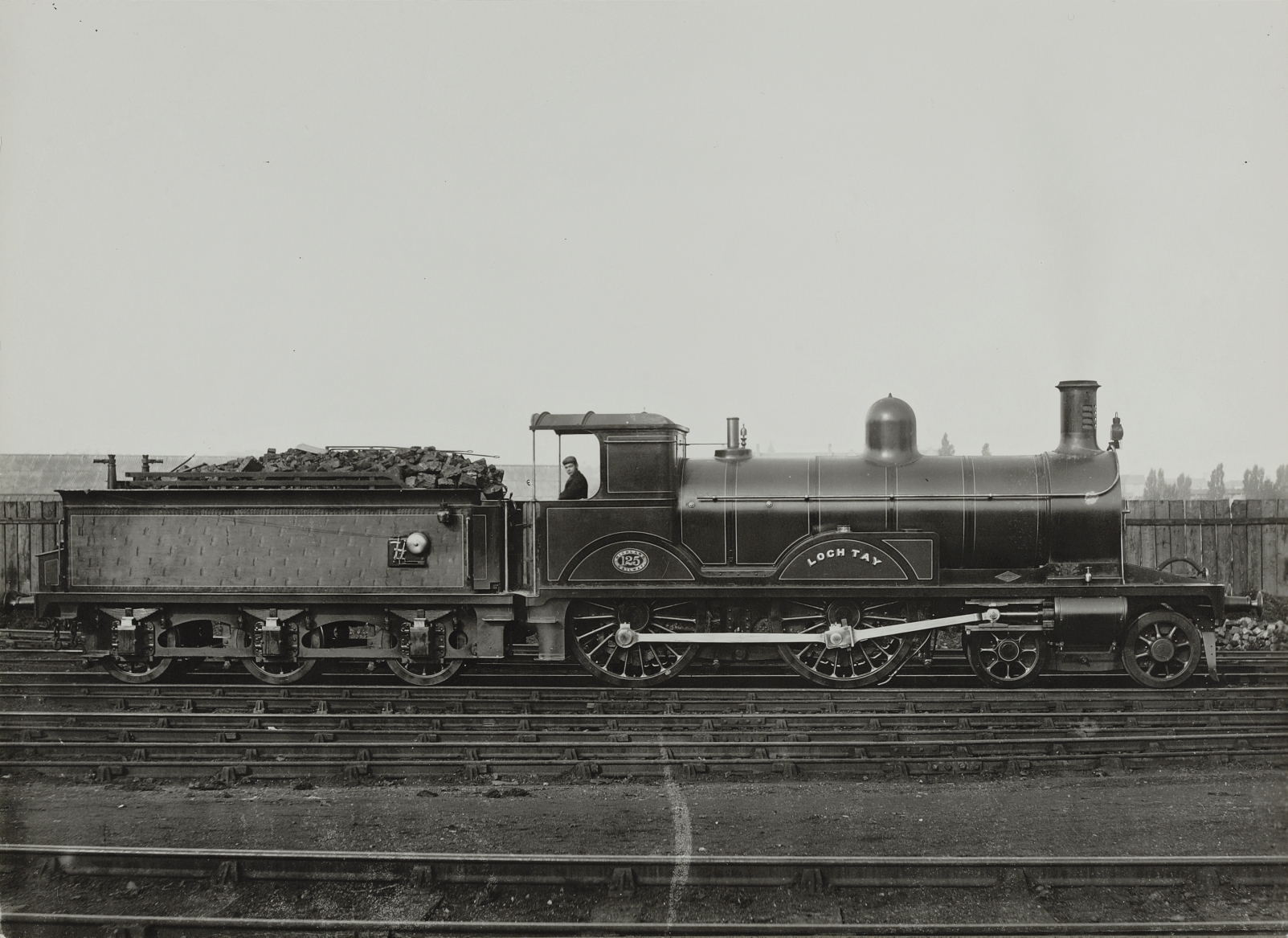
- Highland Railway 125 Loch Tay
Type and origin
- Power type: Steam
- Designer: David Jones
- Builder: Dübs & Co. (15); North British Locomotive (3)
- Serial number: Dübs:3392–3406; NBL: 21456–21458
- Build date: 1896 (15), 1917 (3)
- Total produced: 18
Specifications
- Configuration
  - Whyte: 4-4-0
  - UIC: 2′B n2
- Gauge: 4 ft 8 1/2 in (1,435 mm)
- Leading dia.: 3 ft 3 in (0.991 m)
- Driver dia.: 6 ft 3 1/2 in (1.918 m)
- Loco weight: 54 long tons 10 cwt (122,100 lb or 55.4 t)
- Water cap.: 3,000 imp gal (14,000 L; 3,600 US gal)
- Boiler: 4 ft 4 7/8 in (1.34 m) diameter
- Boiler pressure: 175 lbf/in^{2} (1.21 MPa)
- Heating surface: 1,295 sq ft (120.3 m^{2})
- Cylinders: Two, outside
- Cylinder size: 19 in × 24 in (483 mm × 610 mm)
- Valve gear: Allan
- Valve type: New: piston valves Rebuilt: Balanced slide valves
Performance figures
- Tractive effort: 17,070 lbf (75.93 kN)
Career
- Operators: Highland Railway → LMS → BR
- Class: HR: Loch; B (from 1901)
- Power class: LMS: 2P
- Withdrawn: 1930–1950
- Disposition: All scrapped

The Highland Railway Loch class locomotives were large 4-4-0s normally used north of Inverness. They were introduced in 1896, to the design of David Jones. Fifteen were built by Dübs and Company in Glasgow, all going into traffic between July and September 1896. Three more were built in 1917 by Dübs' successor, the North British Locomotive Company (NBL).

== Design ==
They had the typical Jones appearance with outside cylinders, domed cab roof, louvred chimney, but, as with the Jones Goods class 4-6-0, the Allan style front framing was dispensed with. Allan valve gear was still used.

Despite an interval of over twenty years between the first and second batches, there were few changes in design for the second batch. The boiler tubes were of steel instead of copper; a Westinghouse brake pump was fitted in front of the right-hand side of the cab; and there was an increase in tender water capacity from 3,000 imperial gallons (14,000 L) to 3,100 imperial gallons (14,000 L).

== Numbering ==
Built by Dübs in 1896

| HR number | Name | LMS number | Withdrawn | Notes |
|---|---|---|---|---|
| 119 | Loch Insh | 14379 | 1948 | Name removed in 1944; reinstated in 1946. BR allocated number 54379 never carried |
| 120 | Loch Ness | 14380 | 1940 | |
| 121 | Loch Ericht | 14381 | 1940 | |
| 122 | Loch Moy | 14382 | 1940 | |
| 123 | Loch an Dorb | 14383 | 1934 | |
| 124 | Loch Laggan | 14384 | 1938 | |
| 125 | Loch Tay | 14385 | 1950 | BR allocated number 54385 never carried |
| 126 | Loch Tummel | 14386 | 1938 | |
| 127 | Loch Garry | 14387 | 1930 | |
| 128 | Loch Luichart | 14388 | 1930 | |
| 129 | Loch Maree | 14389 | 1931 | |
| 130 | Loch Fannich | 14390 | 1937 | |
| 131 | Loch Shin | 14391 | 1941 | |
| 132 | Loch Naver | 14392 | 1947 | |
| 133 | Loch Laoghal | 14393 | 1934 | Renamed Loch Laochal at unknown date |

Built by NBL in 1917

| HR number | Name | LMS number | Withdrawn | Notes |
|---|---|---|---|---|
| 70 | Loch Ashie | 14394 | 1936 | |
| 71 | Loch Garve | 14395 | 1935 | |
| 72 | Loch Ruthven | 14396 | 1934 | |

These were needed primarily for the increased traffic on the Kyle line where they were the heaviest locomotives permitted. This period was when the initial traffic of the United States effort in World War I was flowing, and much was brought to the west coast of Scotland in an effort to reduce the effect of the U-boat menace. The trains ran from Kyle to Invergordon so it was a wholly HR traffic.

== Transfer to LMS ==
They passed to the London, Midland and Scottish Railway (LMS) in 1923. The LMS classified them '2P'. Withdrawal occurred from 1930 onwards.

== Transfer to BR ==
Only two survived into British Railways (BR) ownership in 1948. Neither received their allocated BR number before being withdrawn in 1948 ('Loch Insh') and 1950 ('Loch Tay').
