= Rob Donn =

Scottish Gaelic poet

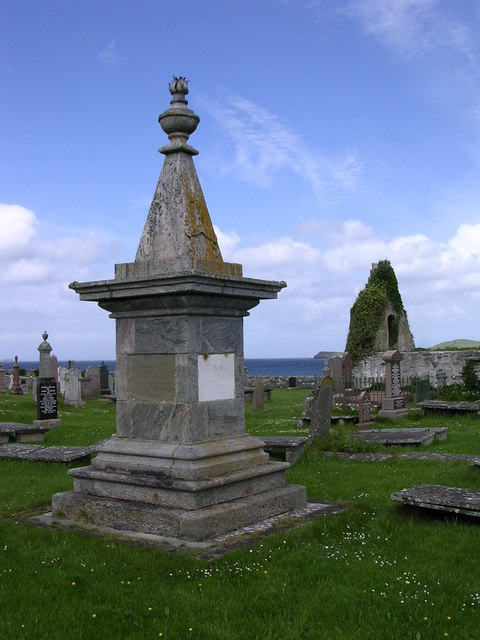
Rob Donn Mackay monument, Balnakeil graveyard, with inscriptions in Gaelic, English, Greek and Latin. Erected 1827.

Rob Donn (Brown-haired Rob) (1714–1778) was a Scottish Gaelic poet from Sutherland. It is generally assumed that his name was Robert Mackay (MacAoidh), but this has been disputed, so he is sometimes referred to as "Rob Donn MacAoidh".

== Biography ==
Born at Allt na Caillich in Strathmore, Sutherland, Rob Donn was the son of Donald Donn, a small farmer. While his surname, whether Mackay or Calder, continues to be debated, he is never referred to in the Highlands except as Rob Donn.

At an early age, his wit and intelligence attracted attention and, at the age of seven or eight, he was taken into the employment of local cattle drover John Mackay of Musal.

He remained illiterate and never learnt to speak English, but was strongly influenced by the poetry of Alexander Pope, which he heard in translation into Gaelic by the local Church of Scotland minister, the Rev. Murdo MacDonald.

Rob Donn's life coincided with three Jacobite Rebellions: in 1715 (when he was only one year old), in 1719 and in 1745.

His own poetical abilities were picked up on very early by Iain MacEachainn MacAoidh, the Clan Mackay tacksman of Strathmore, who would patronise the former cattle drover.

According to Derick Thomson, Iain Mac Eachainn, "was both Rob Donn's employer and his friend, sharing a love of hunting, poetry, and humanity."

Clan Mackay sided with the House of Hanover during the Jacobite rising of 1745. Despite this, the Mackays were included in the repression of Gaelic culture that followed the defeat of the Jacobite clans at the Battle of Culloden in 1746. In Òran Nan Casagan Dubha ("The Song of the Black Cassocks"), Rob Donn's outraged response to the Dress Act 1746, the Bard denounced the banning of Highland clothing and mocked the Lowland dress replacing it. Rob Donn considered the Act to be so insulting that he urged Clan Mackay to change its allegiance from King George II to Prince Charles Edward Stuart.

When Robb Donn's patron, Ian Mac Eachainn, died in 1757, Rob Donn praised the Tacksman in poetry, in a way normally reserved for members of the Scottish nobility. However, Rob Donn made an extremely, "uncharacteristic choice", for the writer of an elegy or work of praise poetry in Scottish Gaelic literature. Rob Donn underlined his praise of Iain Mac Eachainn, "by referring to the shortcomings of others... of his class. Here is a tacksman who is not simply concerned to gather wealth, but who is ready to share it with the needy. Robb Donn turns his elegy into a social document, in what is a highly refreshing way at this period."

In 1759, Rob Donn enlisted in the Sutherland Fencibles during the Seven Years' War. After being demobilized following the end of hostilities in 1763, Rob Donn entered the service of Donald Mackay, 4th Lord Reay as a cattleman. Rob Donn, however, considered threshing the corn to feed the cattle he tended as beneath his dignity and employed a substitute to do the threshing in his place. This did not find favor with the estate Factor and Rob Donn was accordingly dismissed.

After his dismissal, Rob Donn resided at Auchmore and Sango until 1770, when Colonel Hugh Mackay, the son of his former employer, became estate factor to Lord Reay and brought Rob Donn back into the Chief's employment. Robb Donn remained on the Chief's estate until his death in 1778.

Both Lord Reay and the Rev. Murdo MacDonald were great influences on Rob Donn, and were celebrated in his poetry.

== Collection of his poems ==
Although sometimes moralistic, Rob Donn's poetry sometimes also contained bawdy images, which were bowdlerised by later collectors; especially by Presbyterian ministers, who were major figures at the time in collecting and publishing Scottish Gaelic literature from the oral tradition, while also similarly censoring it. A major exception, however, was the Rev. John Thomson, who succeeded Murdo MacDonald as minister of the parish of Durness, and who allowed his daughter to transcribe Rob Donn's works uncensored and from the Bard's own dictation.

Later editors and collectors were not always so kind, in other ways. For example, Rob's Strathnaver dialect was sometimes deliberately rewritten into a more standardised form of Scottish Gaelic, which destroyed certain of the effects and rhythms.

In a diary entry 22 February, 1898, the iconic 19th century Gaelic poet Fr. Allan MacDonald wrote, "Read Rob Donn for vocabulary purposes. His vocabulary is more valuable than his poetry. His subjects are often enough coarse and treated coarsely. His reputation is greater than his merits. I should never dream of comparing him with W. Ross or Alasdair. Even Alein Dall is superior to him in rhyme, rhythm, and humour... Took up W. Ross and read pieces. His vocabulary has not so many strange words as Rob Donn's Reay Country Gaelic... He makes you feel with him and for him. Pity for the language that he died so young."
