= Loch Hope =

Lake in Highland, Scotland

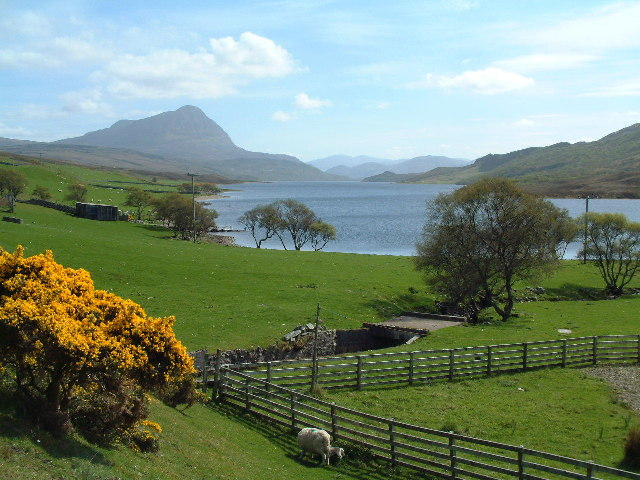

- Location within Sutherland
- Location: Scotland
- Coordinates: 58.45169830°N 4.63755031°W
- Primary inflows: Strathmore River
- Primary outflows: River Hope
- Basin countries: United Kingdom
- Surface area: 7 km^{2} (2.7 sq mi)
- Surface elevation: 3.4 metres (11 ft)
- Frozen: Occasionally parts will freeze

Loch Hope is a fresh-water loch in the Durness parish in Sutherland in the Highland Council Area in northern Scotland. It is oriented north-south, and is about 10 km long, and on average about 1 km wide. The A838 road skirts its northern end at the small settlement of Hope. The loch is an occasional tourist destination for the area around it. Its outflow, the River Hope, becomes tidal immediately below the settlement of Hope. However, many tourists pass through the area (mostly without stopping) as the A838 is part of the popular North Coast 500 route.

== Geography ==
=== Rivers ===
The outflow from the loch is the 1.25 mile (2 km) River Hope, which reaches the sea at the entrance to Loch Eriboll. The inflow is the Strathmore river. This river has a wide catchment area, with a maze of tributaries and temporary brooks and streams in this mountainous area.

=== Mountains ===
The most prominent mountain in the area is Ben Hope, which has an altitude 928 metres and is the most northerly Munro, near the southern end of the loch.

== Settlements ==
Settlements in the area are few and tiny.

=== Hope ===
Hope is the only remotely notable settlement on the loch, and is in itself named after it. It is at the northern outflow of the loch, at the head of the River Hope. There are seven archaeological sites within the settlement and an additional two hut circles just north of the village. The riverside around it is full of weirs, and the settlement has a very small permanent population but is by far the largest of the very few populated settlements on the loch. There is a small enclosure in the settlement and many paths on the other side of the river bank to Hope; there is a ferryman's house on the riverside.

==== Hope Lodge ====
Hope Lodge, built as a shooting lodge, is Scotland's most expensive hotel as of June 2026. It is owned and operated by Wildland Ltd. Hope Lodge was designed in 1878 by William Fowler for the Duke of Sutherland and is a category B listed building.

=== Other places ===
The following places are not notable. For example Braesgill is a single building at grid reference 475571.

==== Lochside ====
Like most places in Scotland unimaginatively called Lochside, Lochside is on the lochside of Loch hope. It is located just east of the loch on the small stream that is Allt na Raipe and within Lochside there's a sheepfold. There are 2 archaeological sites in Lochside. Aside from the road around the Loch, there's only a couple small trails by the settlement. There are some cottages within Lochside.

==== Braesgill ====
A smaller settlement halfway down the loch, Braesgill is yet another farmstead located along the lochside of loch hope. It is named after the river it sits on that flows into Loch Hope it is home to 3 archaeological sites including a simple hut circle. Braesgill has been listed by Ordnance Survey since 1871 in Sutherland Volume 12 although it now ceases to appear on their maps.

==== Merkan ====
Merkan is a mostly lost settlement just south of Braesgill, it too is named after the river it sits on but also a nearby small peak with the same name. It has been depicted by Ordnance Survey maps since 1878. It's located just west of the lochside road and a very small carved path links the remains of a building to it. It has an alternate name, Meirgeach.

==== Muiseal ====
Muiseal is another small farmstead, just south of the Loch. It has listings on Openstreetmap and OS and is labelled as a hamlet. It's far more well known than most of the other settlements. Muiseal is surprisingly home to no archaeological sites however two are just south of it. Muiseal is a reference point for many trails and mountains in the area and the brook Allt An Muiseal runs through it giving it its name. It is 11 metres above sea level, there is a parking lot within it to provide for some of the trails in the area, 1 of which goes to Ben Hope. There's another small track which leads to the Strathmore river and on the other side of the river there's a labelled place called Luib Bhan. Finally there's 2 roofed buildings within Muiseal.

==== Arnaboll ====
Arnaboll is a now abandoned farmstead on the other side of Loch Hope, named after a river and hill with the same name. It consists of an intact building and a prehistoric Hut circle. To add to this there's one archaeological site within Arnaboll.

==== Alltnacaillich ====
Alltnacaillich is one of few places near the loch to get a google maps listing. It is a permanently inhabited hamlet on the Strathmore River Just south of Muiseal. There are 7 archaeological sites within Alltnacaillich. There is a sort of central area of the settlement with housing and trails leaving out of it, all this is atop Allt na Caillich a river where the river is named off of unoriginally. Some of these trails lead to peaks and mountains, but most go west towards the Strathmore where there are links to prehistoric sites, a homestead, graveyard and a nature reserve. Alltnacaillich is also home to a bridge over the Strathmore and a burnt mound and nearby there's Don Dornaigil. Despite there being residents there is no form of hotel or lodge in Alltnacaillich. The hamlet has etymology as it means the burn of the ould woman which was actually the naming of the aforementioned river.

==== Moine House ====
Moine house or Moin House is located east of the loch. It has 3 archaeological sites in the area and is near the banks of another loch, Loch Nam Meur Liath which in itself is near to a larger loch, Loch Maovalley which flows into Loch Hope. It consists of one derelict building and a couple trails. It was built as a place of refuge for people travelling on the nearly built road across the area, now the A838 and has lost its roof. The house was also permanently inhabited and due to its importance in helping travelers, it became a marked point on many different maps. Moine means Gaelic for Moss and the house was inhabited by many notable families some of which would have as many as 8 people. The now archaeological site now has a car park for visitors.
