= Robert Munro (folklorist) =

Scottish minister and folklorist

Rev Robert Munro FRSE FSA (born 26 April 1853) was a Scottish minister of the Free Church of Scotland, remembered as a folklorist and contributor to Encyclopedia Britannica. He wrote extensively on archaeological subjects.

== Life ==
He was born at Mudale House in Strathnaver in Sutherland on 26 April 1853, the son of Hugh Munro and Christina Mackay. He was educated at Strathy School. He then studied divinity at the University of St Andrews, graduating BD and MA, then undergoing further training at New College, Edinburgh.

In 1878 he was appointed minister of the Free Church in Old Kilpatrick in Dunbartonshire.

In 1889 he was elected a fellow of the Royal Society of Edinburgh. His proposers were Hugh Macmillan, William Jolly, Robert Flint, and Alexander Buchan. He resigned from the Society in 1901.

In 1900 he was one of the many members of the Free Church of Scotland who merged with the United Presbyterian Church of Scotland to create the United Free Church of Scotland and he served the latter for the final years of his life.

In 1912 he was living at Barclay manse in Old Kilpatrick.

== Family ==
He claimed descent from the Munroes of Foulis.

In 1884 he married Mary Morison.
