= Langdale Broch =

Iron Age broch in Scotland

- Location in Highlands, Scotland
- 58°22′25″N 4°14′08″W
- Type: Broch
- Periods: Iron Age, Roman
- Location: Sutherland

Lanndale Broch is an Iron Age broch in Sutherland, Scotland.

== Location ==
The broch is located next to Langdale Burn, a quarter mile from the River Naver. It stands on a steep, conical, rock knoll with a more shallow slope on the upstream side. Access is described as "simple and easy going. There is a wooden stile by the road, and from there walking is easy all the way to the broch. From the stile, follow the stone wall around the farm, then cut across to the left hand side of the gate and follow the track to the broch."

== Description ==
There is an entrance on the west, facing upstream. The entrance is about 4.58 m (15 ft) long and 91 cm (3 ft) wide at the outer end. This broch may have had two doors in its entrance passage. The broch is full of debris so that the inner and outer wallfaces are mostly obscured.

The interior is roughly 9.15 m (30 ft) around and the walls are 4.58 m (15 ft) thick at the entrance and 4.88-5.19 m (16–17 ft) on the south side. The external diameter is about 18.91 m (62 ft).

There is a strong suspicion that the mound on which the broch sits is artificial and may even be the remains of a chambered cairn.
