= Loch Naver =

- Loch Nabhair
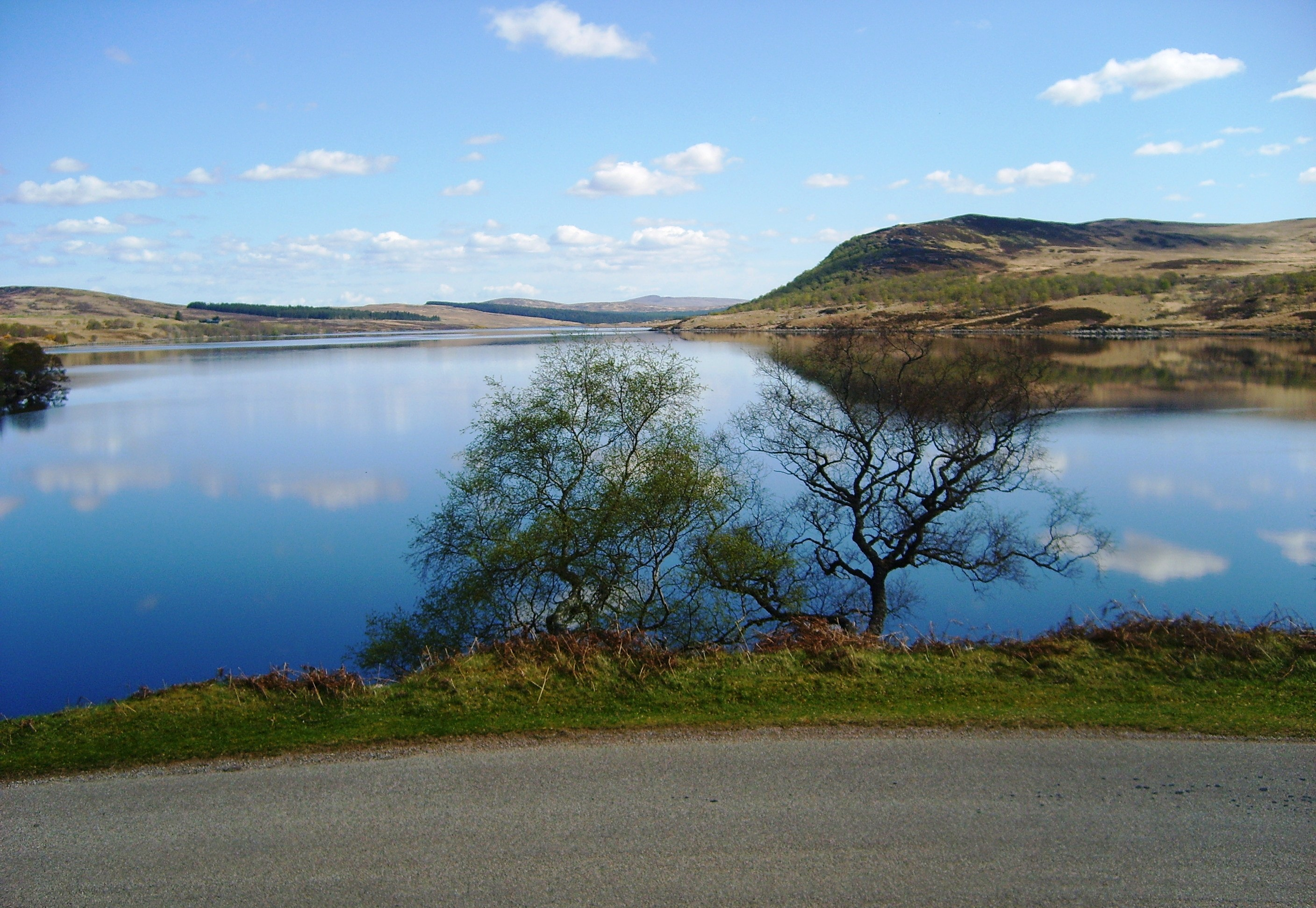
- View across Loch Naver

- Location within Sutherland
- Location: Scotland
- Coordinates: 58.297°N 4.359°W
- Type: Loch
- Primary inflows: River Mudale, River Vagastie
- Primary outflows: River Naver
- Basin countries: United Kingdom
- Max. length: 9.7 kilometres (6.0 mi)
- Surface elevation: 75 metres (246 ft)
- Islands: 1
- Settlements: Altnaharra, Klibreck, Reidhackaistell, Dailmallhart

Loch Naver (Scottish Gaelic: Loch Nabhair) is a loch in the Farr parish in Sutherland in the Highland council area of northern Scotland. It is situated upon the B873 main road. Upon the loch are also the settlements of Kilbreck, Redhackaistelll and Dailmallhart. Additionally Altnaharra and Achanaes are nearby. Fishing is very popular on Loch Naver and the River Naver.

== Geography ==
The Loch is nearly 10 kilometres long but only 200–600 metres across depending on Location, Loch Naver stretches out East-West and water flows eastward from the River Mudale and Loch Staonsaid to the River Naver and Loch Hope.

=== Inflows and outflows ===
The Primary inflows of Loch Naver are the River Mudale and the River Vagastie while the primary outflow is the River Naver. Other inflows include:

- Grummore Burn
- Allt Gruama Beag
- Allt a' Choire Bhuidhe
- Allt a' Chnoic Leith
- Allt Ach' a' Chuil
- Allt Ruigh na Sealbhaig
- Allt Creagach
- Kilbreck Burn

== Fishing ==
Fishing is very common not only in Loch Naver but also in the River Naver, as it is a top place to catch trout. The Stathnaver area is often referred to as one of the best areas for fishing in the country. People wishing to stay in the area have choice with there being a caravan park on the Loch as well as lodges in Alltnaharra and Syre.
