= Stiomrabhaig =

- Abandoned crofter's village
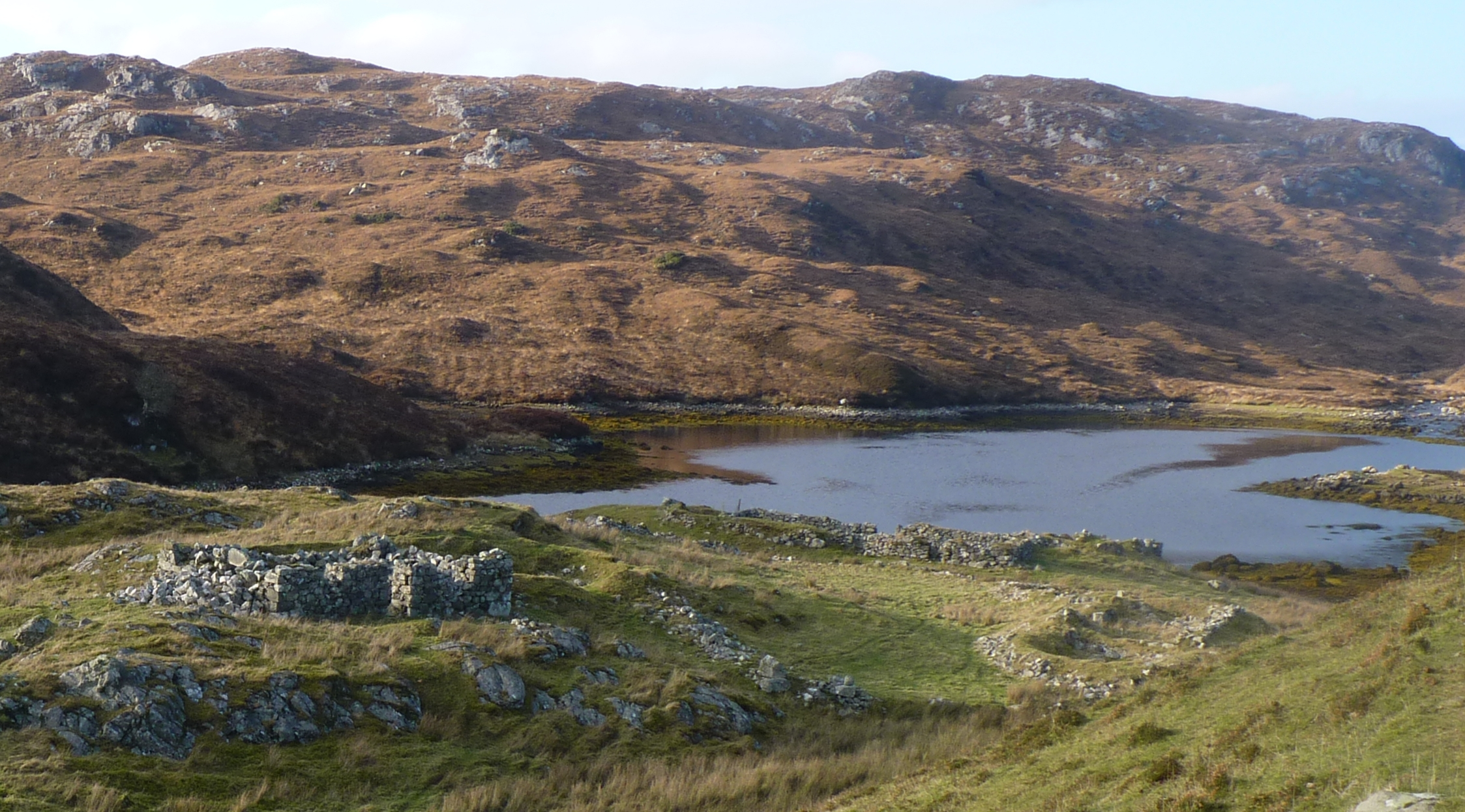
- The abandoned township of Stiomrabhaigh looking North West

- Location within Lewis
- Coordinates: 58.014213°N 6.493649°W
- Country: Scotland

Stiomrabhaig is an abandoned crofter's village on the Isle of Lewis in the Outer Hebrides.

== History ==
The United Kingdom Census 1851 shows that the village consisted of 16 dwellings and supported a population of 81. By 1858 there were none. Clearances had been well underway in the area during the first half of the 19th century; many of them brutal and uncaring. The residents of Stiomrabhaigh were better placed than most having leases directly with the land owner but when these expired they accepted an offer of crofts in Leumrabhagh.

Lewis was relatively prosperous right up until World War I, which put an end to the herring trade with Russia and Eastern Europe, and in spite of the clearances the increasing population put pressure on land. There were numerous requests to resettle Stiomrabhaigh all of which were resisted by the landowners and it was not until 1921 when Lord Leverhulme abandoned his ambitious plan for Lewis that crofters returned to the township. Even the resettlement was marked with tragedy as two young men were drowned while transporting household goods from Calbost.

These settlers were never officially recognized as crofters by the government; they received no help and no road was built to the township. Given the difficulties of living without facilities over the next twenty years a number of the families drifted back to Leumrabhagh. At the start of World War II only two families remained and by the end of the 1940s Stiomrabhaigh was once again deserted.

== Today ==
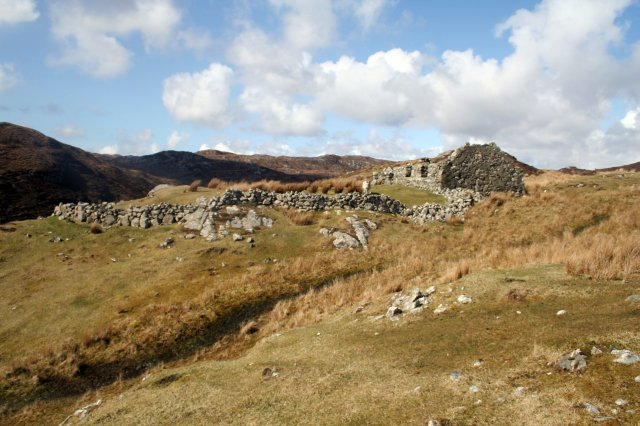
Ruined blackhouse at Stiomrabhaig

Today there is much of the township to be seen; its ruined buildings, lazy beds and field walls standing in isolation between the moor and the sea.
