= Fort William Mountain Festival =

The Fort William Mountain Festival is an annual festival of mountain culture held in Fort William, Scotland.
