= Dun Dornaigil =

Tower in Highland, Scotland, UK

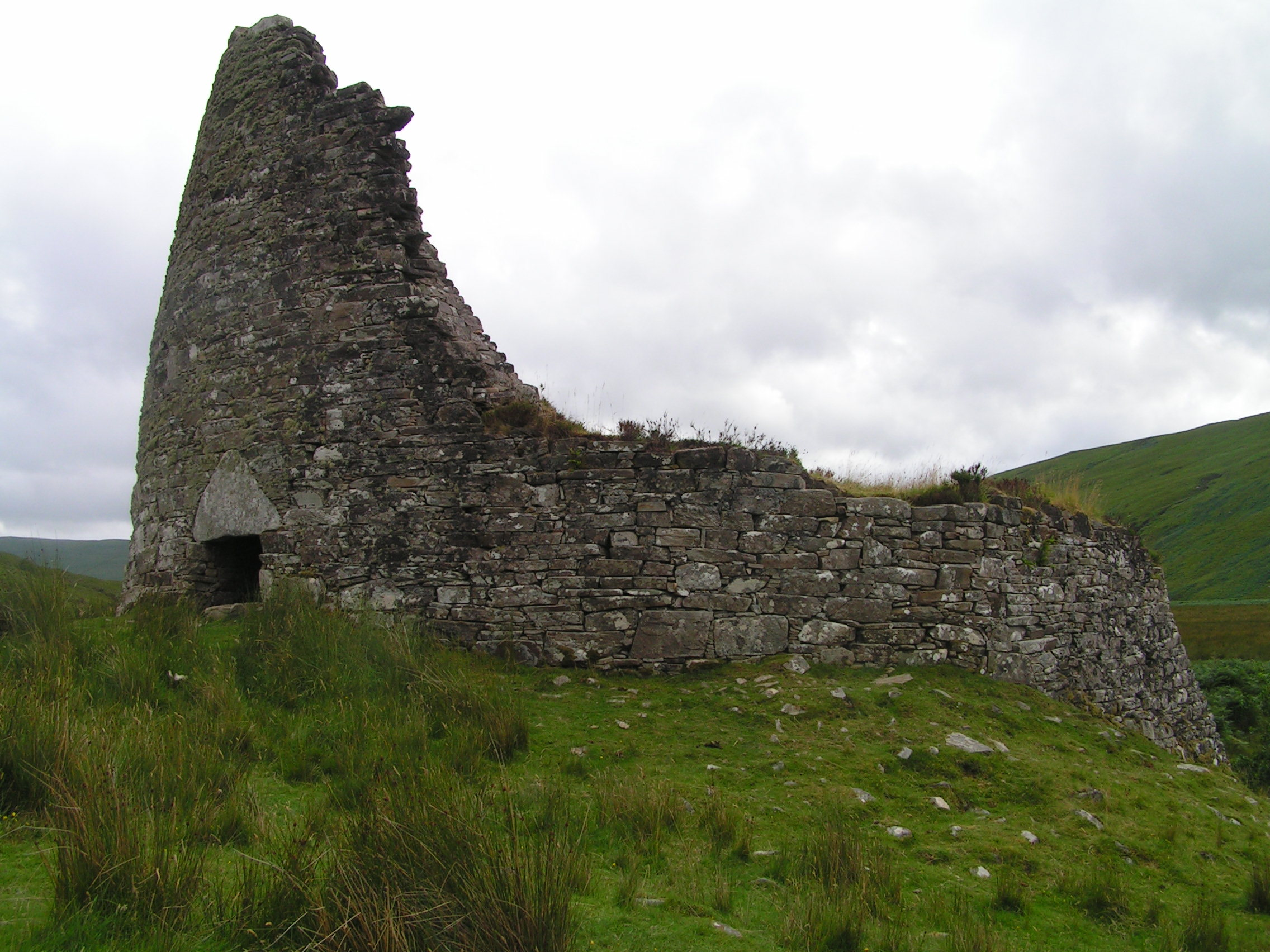
- Dun Dornaigil

- Location within Highland
- 58°22′00.00″N 004°38′19.05″W
- Type: Broch
- Periods: Iron Age
- Location: Scottish Highlands

Site notes
- Owner: Historic Scotland

Dun Dornaigil is an Iron Age broch in Sutherland in the Scottish Highlands (grid reference NC45714501). It is in Strathmore on the eastern bank of the Strathmore River. It is under the care of Historic Environment Scotland. The interior has been filled and is now inaccessible.

== Location ==
Dun Dornaigil is located next to the Strathmore River, south of Ben Hope. Under the care of Historic Environment Scotland, it has limited parking space and an information board for visitors.

== Description ==
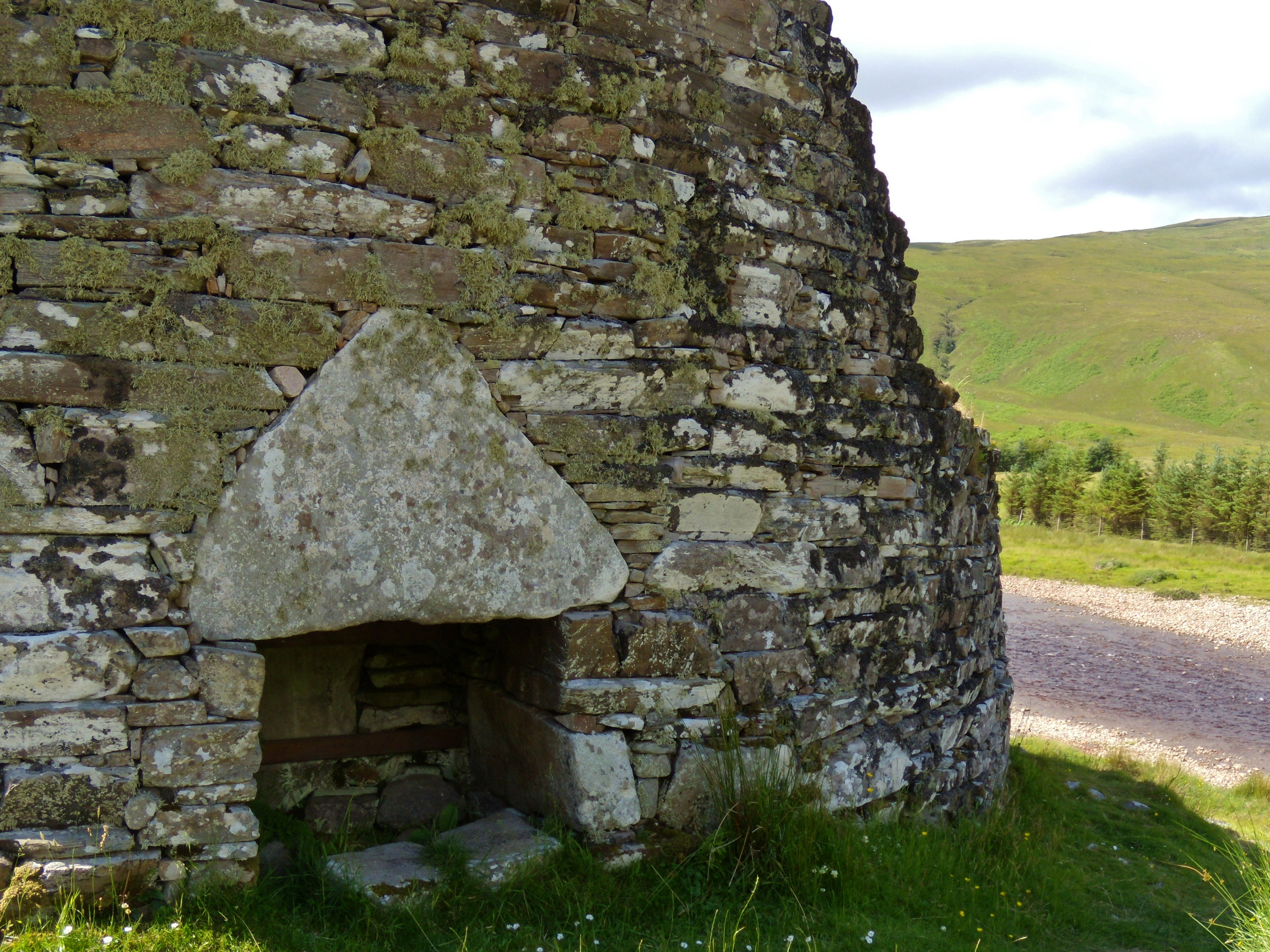
Doorway with a massive triangular lintel

The broch has an external diameter of about 14.5 metres. The walls of Dun Dornaigil generally survive from 2 to 3 metres around the circumference of the broch, but above the doorway they rise to nearly 7 metres. The entrance is on the northeast side but is filled with debris. There is a massive triangular lintel over the entrance which measures 1.4 metres along the base, and 0.9 metres in height. The interior of the broch is still filled with collapsed rubble from the upper levels and is therefore not accessible.
