= Ben Klibreck =

Mountain in Scotland

Coordinates: 58.235835°N 4.409435°W

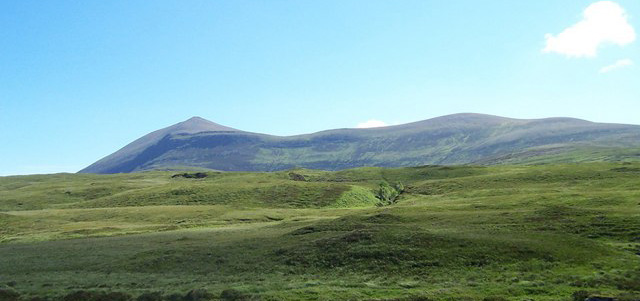
- Ben Klibreck from Strath Vagastie

Highest point
- Elevation: 962 m (3,156 ft)
- Prominence: 818 m (2,684 ft)Ranked 32nd in British Isles
- Listing: Munro, Marilyn

Naming
- Native name: Scottish Gaelic: Beinn Chlìbric
- English translation: "hill of the speckled cliff"
- Pronunciation: Scottish Gaelic: [peɲ ˈxliːpɾʲɪkʲ]

Geography
- Location: Highland, Scotland
- Parent range: Northwest Highlands
- OS grid: NC585299
- Topo map: OS Landranger 16, OS Explorer 443

Ben Klibreck (Scottish Gaelic: Beinn Chlìbric) is a Scottish mountain located in central Sutherland. It is an isolated mountain, rising above a large area of moorland. The highest point, Meall nan Con (the mound of the dogs), rises to 962 metres (3,156 ft) elevation and is therefore the second most northerly Munro after Ben Hope (Beinn Hòb). The western side of the hill is a fairly uniform steep, heathery slope, while the eastern side has a series of large, grassy corries and has been described as having more character.

Numerous ascents of Ben Klibreck are possible. It can be climbed from Crask to the south or Altnaharra to the north, but the easiest and most popular route is from the A836 to the west, by way of Loch nan Uan and up steep slopes to the summit ridge, which is then followed to the summit.

Ben Kilbreck and the land surrounding it are designated a Site of Special Scientific Interest (SSSI) by NatureScot due to its geological features, alpine heathland, blanket bog, lochs and woodland.
