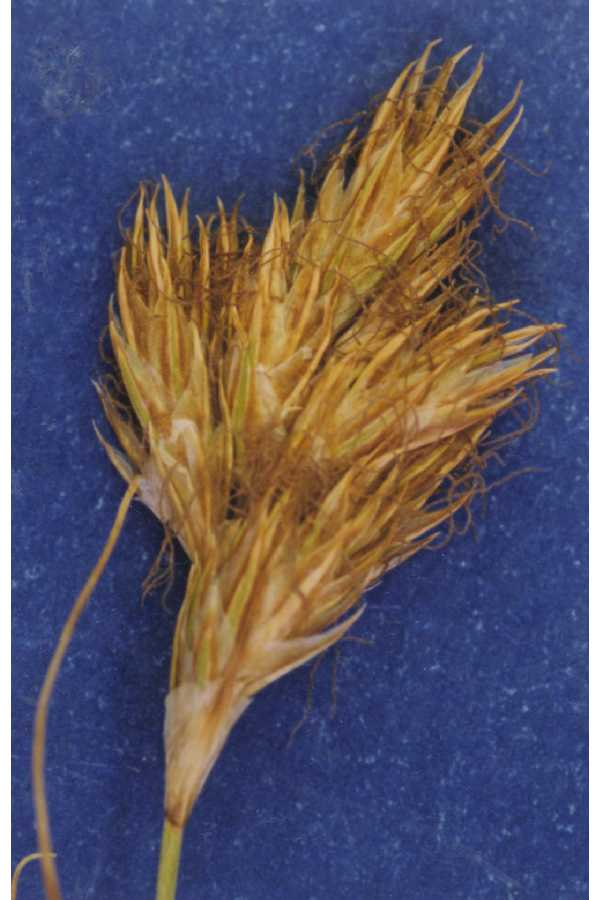

Scientific classification
- Kingdom: Plantae
- Clade: Tracheophytes
- Clade: Angiosperms
- Clade: Monocots
- Clade: Commelinids
- Order: Poales
- Family: Cyperaceae
- Genus: Carex
- Species: C. douglasii

Binomial name
- Carex douglasii Boott

= Carex douglasii =

Species of grass-like plant

Carex douglasii is a species of sedge known by the common name Douglas' sedge.

== Distribution ==
It is native to much of western North America, including the western Canadian provinces, the western United States, and Baja California. It grows in dry, wet, and seasonally moist habitat, from prairie and grassland to marshes. It is tolerant of sandy and alkaline substrates.

== Description ==
Carex douglasii is a sedge producing triangular stems up to about 40 centimeters high from thin rhizomes. The leaves are thick but narrow and sometimes rolled. The plant is dioecious, with male and female flowers occurring on different individuals. The pistillate inflorescence is distinctive, with female flowers bearing long, protruding, persistent stigmas that tangle together into a wide mass.
