= Strathnaver =

River valley in northern Scotland

River Naver
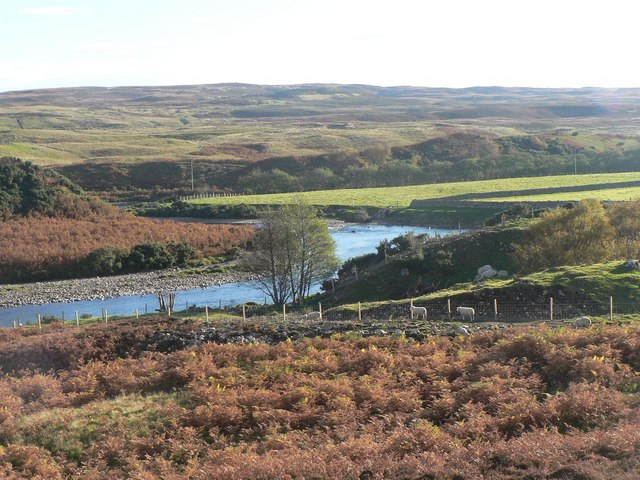
- River Naver near Achargary

Location
- Country: Scotland

Physical characteristics
- Source
  - location: Loch Naver
  - coordinates: 58°18′42″N 4°16′58″W
- Mouth
  - location: Bettyhill
  - coordinates: 58°31′44″N 4°14′22″W
- Length: 29 km (18 mi)

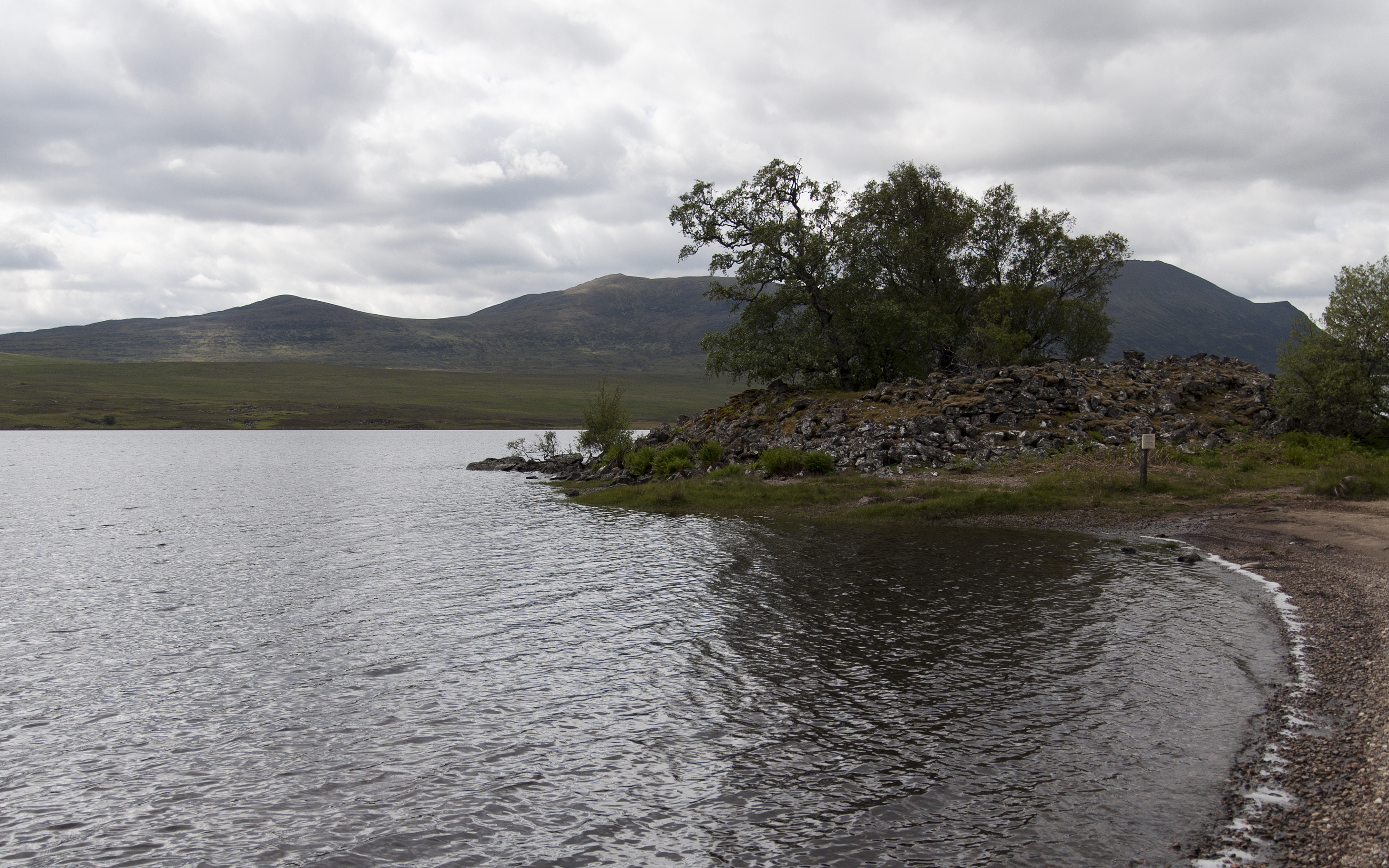
The Grummore Broch

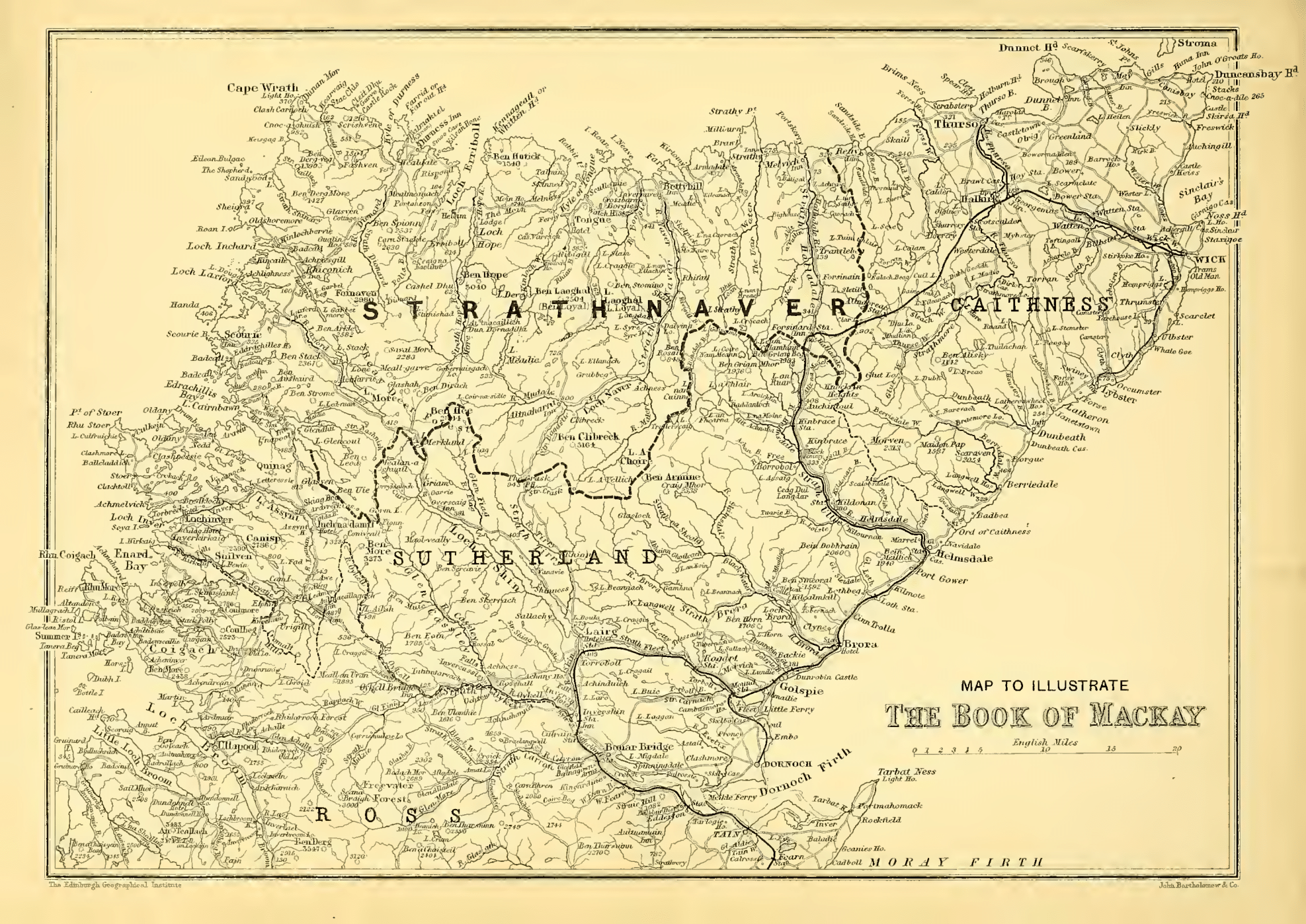
Territory of the Clan Mackay that was known as Strathnaver, in relation to Sutherland and Caithness; the boundary is marked with a dashed line

Strathnaver or Strath Naver (Scottish Gaelic: Srath Nabhair) is the fertile strath of the River Naver, a famous salmon river that flows from Loch Naver to the north coast of Scotland. The term has a broader use as the name of an ancient province also known as the Mackay Country (Scottish Gaelic: Dùthaich MhicAoidh), once controlled by the Clan Mackay and extending over most of northwest Sutherland.

== Geography ==
Loch Naver lies at the head of the strath, in the shadow of Ben Klibreck. The loch is 10 km (6 mi) long and 33 m (108 ft) deep. The Altnaharra Hotel at the western end of the loch has been used by anglers since the early 19th century. The loch is fed by two rivers (Mudale and Vagastie) and several burns. Just below the loch, the Naver is joined by the River Mallart coming down from Loch Choire. It then flows through the Naver Forest and under the road bridge at Syre. The Langdale Burn and Carnachy Burn are other major tributaries as the strath widens out and flows into the sea at Bettyhill.

Most of Strathnaver lies in the ecclesiastical and former civil parish of Farr, named after a village on the coast northeast of Bettyhill, where the former parish church now houses the Strathnaver Museum. Today it is administered as part of the Highland Council area.

== History ==
The Nabaros is mentioned by the Greek writer Ptolemy in the 2nd century and is shown on his map. The name may derive from nabh, an Indo-European root meaning "cloud". There is evidence of Neolithic settlements in the strath, including a "village" on the raised beach opposite Bettyhill.

There are several brochs in the strath and on the hills on either side, including one by Loch Naver at Grummore dating to between 100BC and 100AD.

By the eleventh century, the Norwegian family who ruled Orkney were Earls of Caithness and extended their control into Strathnaver. In the late 12th century, Earl Harald Maddadsson was defeated at the battle at Dalharrold, where the River Naver issues from the loch, by the Norse King of the Hebrides, Rognvald Godrodarson, with a combined force of Irish and Hebrideans. Harald was driven down the strath to the coast, and escaped to Orkney. The Orkneyinga Saga says however that Harold stayed in Orkney, and this location of the battle rests solely on tradition.

Clan Mackay now came to prominence; in 1408, Angus Dubh Mackay attained power. After the Battle of Dingwall in 1411, he married Elizabeth Macdonald, sister of Donald Macdonald, Lord of the Isles. By 1427, the Mackay was important enough to be one of the chiefs summoned to a parliament in Inverness, where they were arrested by the treachery of James I. At that time he had 4000 men under his command according to the Scotichronicon; such power led to his nickname of Enneas-en-Imprissi or "Angus the Absolute".

The Earls of Sutherland contested control of Strathnaver with the Mackays for centuries; in 1230, the courtesy title Lord Strathnaver was created for the heir to the Sutherland earldom. The two families usually took opposing sides; for example, in 1554, the Regent Mary of Guise paid expenses incurred by the 11th Earl of Sutherland to arrest Iye Mackay and bring him to Edinburgh. In 1578, John Robson and Alexander Gordon, 12th Earl of Sutherland fought the men of Strathnaver led by the Mackays in the battle of Creag-Drumi-Doun, up on Druim Chuibhe opposite Bettyhill.

By the middle of the 17th century, their attempts to compete with the more powerful Sutherlands meant the Mackays were under severe financial strain. Despite being devout Presbyterians and Covenanters, they were Royalists during the Wars of the Three Kingdoms, in part because the Sutherlands were on the opposite side. However, they continued to decline in influence relative to the Sutherlands who purchased the last of their Scottish estates from Lord Reay in 1829. The Scottish general Hugh Mackay settled in the Netherlands in the 1670s and this branch ultimately became hereditary Chiefs of Clan Mackay, holding the titles of Lord Reay in the Scottish peerage and Lord of Ophemert and Zennewijnen in the Netherlands.

Strathnaver, like many places in the Highlands, was involved in the Highland Clearances, with the eviction of tenants to allow the creation of large sheep farms. These generated a higher rental income to the Sutherland Estate than the mixed farms that existed in the inland areas of the strath before clearance. A second objective of clearance was to overcome the recurrent years of famine that afflicted the region. (Note: 1803 was a famine year for Strathnaver, and the timing of this event contributed to the decision to clear the inland areas)

The displaced tenants were offered crofts, with some shared grazing, in the coastal regions. The intention was that many would earn a living from fishing, as well as obtaining some subsistence from crops and a few cattle. The people evicted resented this change as a loss of status from farmer to crofter, but this was not understood by the estate when they started implementing their plans in Strathnaver in 1814. (Note: In June 1819, Frances Suther (the factor who replaced Sellar and Young) commented to James Loch, the Sutherland Estate Commissioner: "....indeed I have lately found out that the people in the Hills all considered themselves farmers and took it as a degradation to be compared to Labourers and Fishermen.")

The first clearances in Strathnaver involved only 28 families (an estimated 140 people). (Note: This number may be an underestimate as the source of the information is the Sutherland Estate records. These do not include details of the residents who were sub-tenants. William Chisholm is an example of one of these.) Eviction notices were given in December 1813 by Patrick Sellar, the estate factor. (Note: Sellar's position is variously described as factor or under-factor. He had a joint position with William Young, who was the senior of the two in this joint role.) The notices took effect on Whitsun 1814. (Note: 29 May in 1814, the seventh Sunday after Easter) Events were complicated by two things. Firstly, Sellar had successfully bid for the lease of the sheep farm that the clearance would create. Secondly, the laying out of the land for the new crofts had been seriously delayed, so displaced tenants had little time to prepare for their removal. Nevertheless, some departed before the appointed day, whilst others waited for the eviction party's arrival.

As was normal practice, the roof timbers of cleared houses were destroyed to prevent re-occupation after the eviction party had left. On 13 June 1814, this was done by burning in the case of Badinloskin, the house occupied by William Chisholm. Accounts vary, but it is possible that his elderly and bedridden mother-in-law was still in the house when it was set on fire. In James Hunter's understanding of events, Sellar ordered her to be immediately carried out as soon as he realised what was happening. The old lady died 6 days later. Eric Richards suggests that the old woman was carried to an outbuilding before the house was destroyed. Whatever the facts of the matter, Sellar was charged with culpable homicide and arson, in respect of this incident and others during this clearance. The charges were brought by Robert Mackid, the Sheriff Depute, driven by the enmity he held for Sellar for catching him poaching. As the trial approached, the Sutherland estate was reluctant to assist Sellar in his defence, distancing themselves from their employee. He was acquitted of all charges at his trial in 1816. The estate were hugely relieved, taking this as a justification of their clearance activity. (Robert Mackid had to leave the county to rebuild his career elsewhere, providing Sellar with a grovelling letter of apology and confession before he left.) Nevertheless, Sellar and William Young were dismissed and replaced by Francis Suther, working under the direction of James Loch. Sellar remained as the tenant of the new sheep farm in Strathnaver, Rhiloisk.

A much larger clearance was undertaken in Strathnaver under the factorship of Suther in 1819 involving 236 families (approximately 1,180 people). Loch was anxious to move quickly whilst cattle prices were high and there was a good demand for leases of sheep farms. After Sellar's trial the estate was concerned about the risk of bad publicity. However, Suther, despite precise instructions to the contrary, used fire to destroy cleared houses. This came after a spell of dry weather, in which the turf and stone walls of the houses had dried out, so that the turf in the walls ignited, adding to the blaze of the thatch and roof timbers. Multiplied over the large number of properties that were cleared, this made a horrific impression on those who observed it. The public relations disaster that Loch had wished to avoid now followed, with the Observer newspaper running the headline: "the Devastation of Sutherland". 1819 became known as "the year of the burnings" (bliadhna na losgaidh). (Note: The journalist and popular author John Prebble, in his book published in 1963, attributes the term "the year of the burnings" to 1814. This appears to be an error, but as Prebble's book was widely read, this has been copied into many of the minor populist works on the subject. The account of Donald MacLeod, who claims to have been an eye-witness to the Sutherland Clearances, though it does not use the term "year of the burnings", strongly suggests that historian James Hunter's interpretation of the phrase is correct.) (Note: Loch severely admonished Suther for using fire in making the houses uninhabitable. Suther defended his actions by explaining how cleared tenants in Kildonan had rebuilt their houses as soon as the eviction parties had left. Loch accepted that this did happen when houses were cleared, but did not rescind the prohibition of burning houses from which tenants had been evicted.)

The result of this clearance activity was the transformation of the strath from traditional semi-subsistence agriculture to sheep farming. (Note: Benjamin Meredith, a surveyor hired by the Sutherland Estate prior to clearance, reported that Strathnaver's climate was sufficient to grow cereal crops (comparing this to the land around Golspie, on Sutherland's southeast facing coast). He stated that the principle produce were black cattle, garrons, sheep and goats. The cattle were the main emphasis of agricultural activity and generated the larger part of the money that was in circulation. The "most industrious" of the residents would migrate south for employment during the spring and summer. John Henderson, another who advised the estate at this time, estimated the population at 2,000 people, made up of 338 families living in 60 or more communities. He estimated the total number of breeding cattle in the strath at 4,000.) In later years the Highland Clearances were re-examined, notably by the Napier Commission, who published their report in 1884. One outcome of this was the creation of the Congested Districts Board (CDB) in 1897, tasked with alleviating the problems of the over-crowded crofting communities created by clearance. This coincided with Patrick Sellar's grandson deciding not to continue with the tenancy in Strathnaver. After protracted negotiations, the CDB were able to buy North Syre in 1901 and lay it out into 29 substantial crofts, creating the present-day landscape.

== Natural history ==
The River Naver is designated a Special Area of Conservation due to its importance for Atlantic salmon (Salmo salar), and Freshwater pearl mussels (Margaritifera margaritifera). At one time there was a significant pearl fishery on both the Naver and Mallart.

The River Naver and its major tributary, the River Mallart, are designated a Special Area of Conservation (SAC) and a Site of Special Scientific Interest (SSSI). This designation is primarily due to the rivers' internationally important populations of Atlantic salmon (Salmo salar) and Freshwater pearl mussels (Margaritifera margaritifera).

The river system is particularly important as it represents the northern extreme of the freshwater pearl mussel's range in the United Kingdom. The mussel populations in the Naver and Mallart are considered high-quality, with evidence of numerous juveniles present, indicating a functional, successfully recruiting population. The survival of this Critically Endangered species is intrinsically linked to the salmon population, as the mussel's life cycle requires them to spend their larval stage (known as glochidia) attached harmlessly to the gills of young salmon and trout before settling into the riverbed.

As adults, the mussels are filter feeders, removing particles from the water column and contributing significantly to the river's clean, well-oxygenated water quality. Although historical records confirm that there was a significant pearl fishery on both the Naver and Mallart, conservation efforts have been implemented to mitigate threats like illegal pearl fishing and pollution run-off, which are critical to the species' future survival. The River Naver also supports a high-quality Atlantic salmon population that is representative of the species' northerly range in the UK. Due to the cooler ambient water temperature, the salmon parr (juveniles) develop slower and smolting (migrating to sea) at an older age. These fish often return as large, multi sea-winter salmon, though the full range of life-history types—including grilse, spring, and summer salmon—are all present.nThe river is also notable for being relatively free from flow modifications, allowing for unhindered fish migration.

== Notable people ==
- Rob Donn (1714–1778) local poet and highly important figure in post-Culloden Scottish Gaelic literature.
- Rev Robert Munro, minister, folklorist and contributor to Encyclopædia Britannica, was born in Strathnaver in 1853 and raised there.

== Tourism ==
The river has long enjoyed a reputation as a productive salmon river. The area is marketed to non-fishermen as "Mackay Country".

The B873 road runs along the west side of the strath from Altnaharra, alongside Loch Naver, to Syre, from whence the B871 continues to a junction with the A836 a few miles south of Bettyhill. These roads, together with an unclassified road running south from the east end of the Invernaver bridge through Skelpick, connect the Strathnaver Trail of historic sites.

== See also ==
- Highland Railway Loch Class - Number 132 of this class of railway engines was named Loch Naver
- RMS Strathnaver
