= Ben Hope =

Scottish mountain

Coordinates: 58.41355°N 4.60874°W

- Beinn Hòb
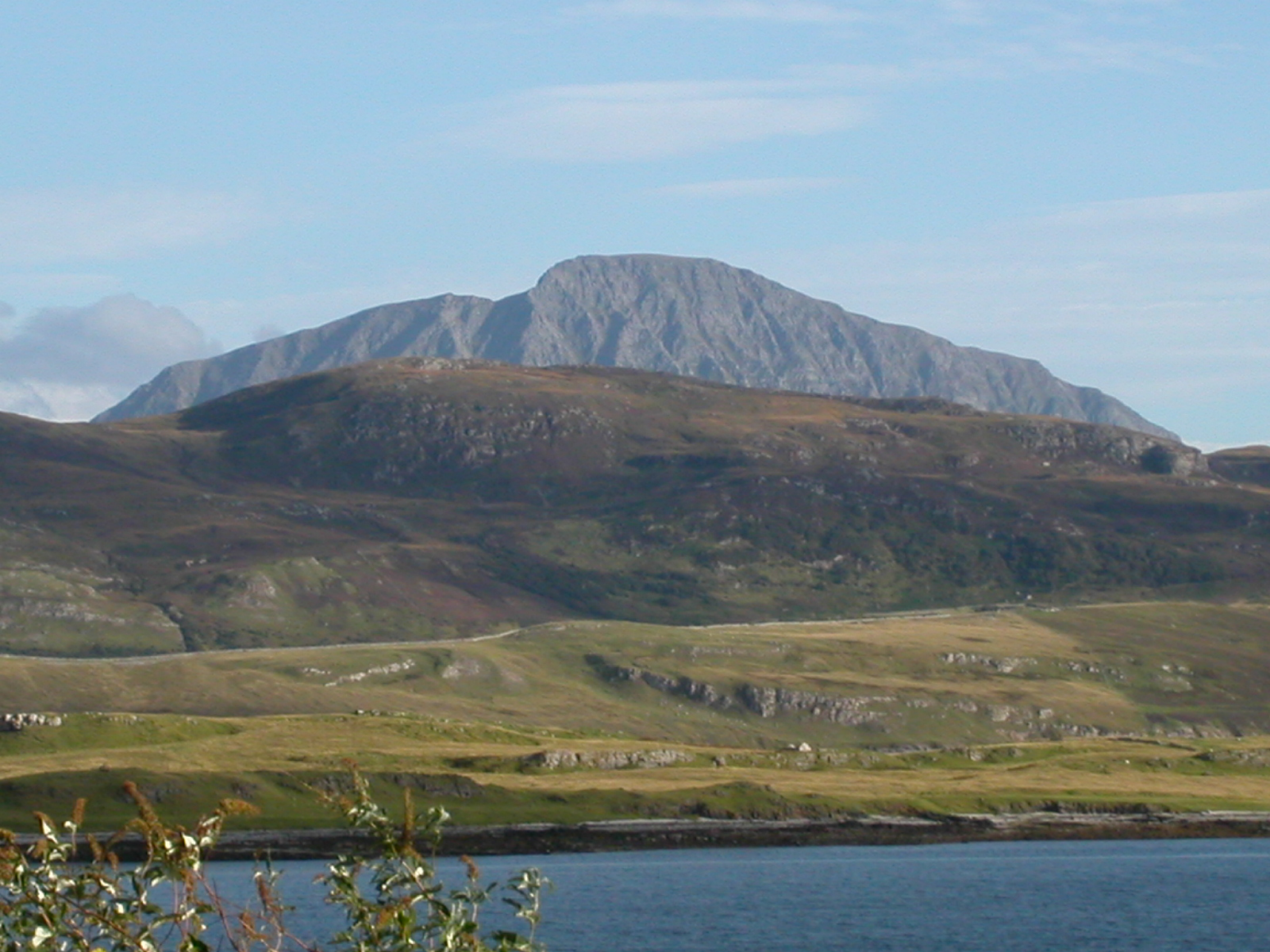
- Ben Hope from the west shore of Loch Eriboll

Highest point
- Elevation: 927 m (3,041 ft)
- Prominence: 772 m (2,533 ft)
- Parent peak: Ben Klibreck
- Listing: Munro, Marilyn

Naming
- English translation: mountain of the bay
- Language of name: Scottish Gaelic and Norse
- Pronunciation: Scottish Gaelic: [peɲ ˈhɔːp]

Geography
- Location: Sutherland, Scotland
- OS grid: NC477502
- Topo map: OS Landranger 9

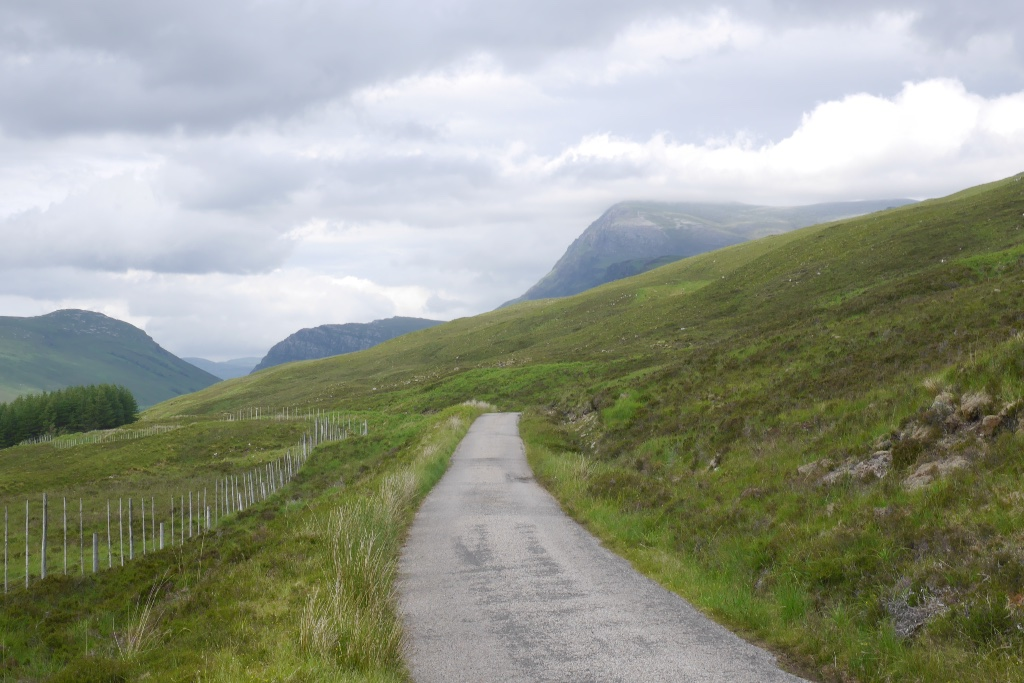
Cloud over Ben Hope from Hope Road, Strath More.

Ben Hope (Scottish Gaelic: Beinn Hòb) is a mountain in northern Scotland. It is the most northerly Munro, standing alone in the Flow Country (a region of bumpy, peat-covered moorland) south-east of Loch Hope in Sutherland. The mountain is a roughly triangular wedge, with a great crag on the west, with two lower shoulders to the south and northeast. Alpine flowers are abundant in season, although the ground is very rocky. The mountain of Ben Hope is situated within the Ben Hope Site of Special Scientific Interest (SSSI). The SSSI has been designated by NatureScot due to its geological features, upland habits and plant species present.

The Aetherius Society considers it to be one of its 19 holy mountains.

== Ascent ==
The principal route to the summit starts in Strathmore, to the west of the mountain, where there is parking off a small road. The route lies along the Allt-na-caillich burn which flows down through a gap in the west-facing crags. The route is steep, but well marked with occasional cairns and not exposed. There is little available scrambling.

Approach from the east is rare, as there is a wide expanse of heather-covered moorland with no roads in that direction. Approach from the north is not possible for walkers, as there is no path between the crags.

The view from the summit includes the Pentland Firth, Loch Eriboll and the nearby mountains of Arkle and Foinaven. The Orkney Islands are visible on a clear day.

Just south of the Allt-na-caillich burn on the Strathmore road is the Dùn Dornaigil Broch.

== See also ==
- Highlands of Scotland
- Andy Nisbet
