= Dalhalvaig =

Coordinates: 58.46424°N 3.90514°W

Dalhalvaig: Scottish Gaelic: Dail Healabhaig
- Location within the Sutherland area
- OS grid reference: NC889544
- Council area: Highland
- Lieutenancy area: Sutherland
- Country: Scotland
- Sovereign state: United Kingdom
- Postcode district: KW13 6
- Police: Scotland
- Fire: Scottish
- Ambulance: Scottish

Dalhavaig across Halladale River from above Nhare

Dalhalvaig (Scottish Gaelic: Dail Healabhaig) is a small crofting village, located in the right bank of the River Halladale in the Scottish council area of Highland.

Dalhalvaig was originally in the parish of Reay, which itself was partly in the county of Caithness and partly in the county of Sutherland. However, in 1891 the parish boundaries changed so that the portion of the parish of Reay that was in Sutherland was disjointed and became part of the parish of Farr in Sutherland and therefore Dalhalvaig is today situated in the parish of Farr, county of Sutherland.

The A897 road runs past the village, with the villages of Croick, Trantlemore and Trantlebeg in the south, and the Melvich to the north.
