= Strath Halladale =

Coordinates: 58.465°N 3.901°W

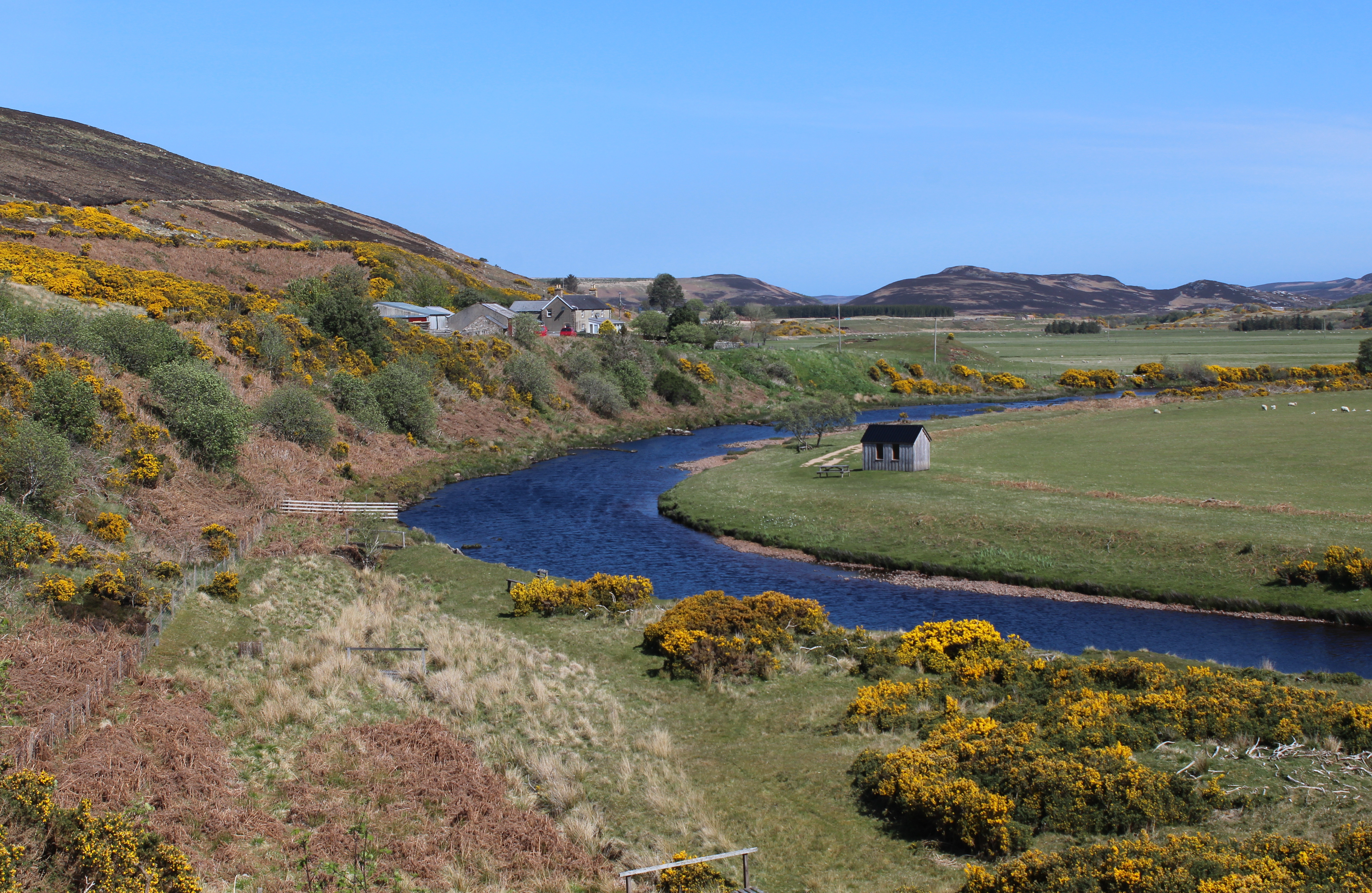
Bighouse, Strath Halladale

Strath Halladale is a strath in the traditional county of Sutherland in the north of Scotland down which the Halladale River flows to enter the Atlantic Ocean at Melvich Bay. It is followed by the A897 road between Forsinard and just short of Melvich where it joins the A836 north coast road, just east of Halladale Bridge, the lowest road crossing of the river. The headwaters of the river gather within The Flows National Nature Reserve and head northwest towards Forsinard. The flow is soon joined by the left bank tributaries of the Catsack and Ewe burns. The main tributary is the left-bank River Dyke or Abhainn Bheag which joins just south of the twin settlements of Trantlemore and Trantlebeg on the west and eastern sides of the valley respectively. There are a large number of broch ruins within Strath Halladale.
