= Farr, Sutherland =

Coordinates: 58.53775°N 4.19703°W

Farr: Scottish Gaelic: Fàrr
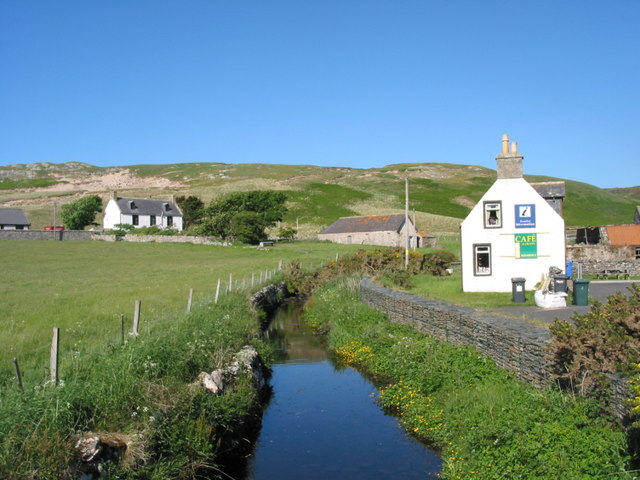
- Farr at Far Bay

- Location within the Sutherland area
- OS grid reference: NC721631
- Council area: Highland
- Lieutenancy area: Sutherland
- Country: Scotland
- Sovereign state: United Kingdom
- Post town: Bettyhill
- Postcode district: KW14 7
- Police: Scotland
- Fire: Scottish
- Ambulance: Scottish

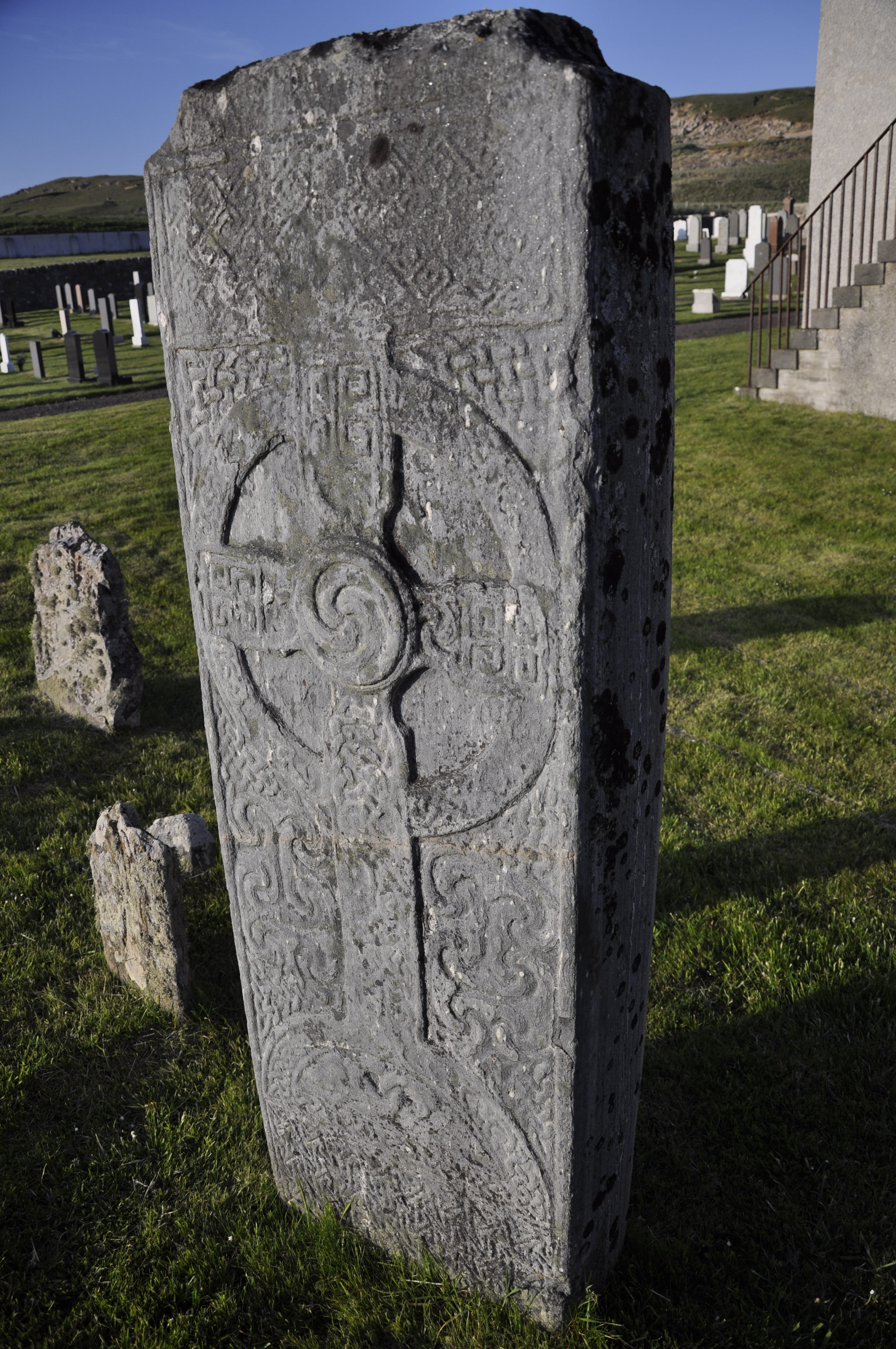
The Farr Stone at the graveyard of the Farr Parish Church, now the Strathnaver Museum

Farr (Scottish Gaelic: Fàrr) is a parish in the county of Sutherland in the Scottish council area of Highland. The parish also includes a small hamlet named Farr. The village of Bettyhill lies less than 1 mile (1.6 kilometres) to the west of the hamlet along the A836 road.

== Parish of Farr ==
=== Villages and hamlets ===
The Parish of Farr is defined by the community council areas of 1) Bettyhill, Strathnaver and Altnaharra, 2) Strathy and Armadale and 3) Melvich (including Portskerra, Strath Halladale as far as Forsinard).Villages and hamlets within the parish of Farr include:

- Achiemore
- Achina
- Altnaharra
- Armadale
- Aultiphurst
- Balnacraig
- Bettyhill
- Farr (the hamlet)
- Lednagullin
- Melvich
- Strathnaver
- Swordly
- Upper Bighouse

== Fishing ==
The Annual Reports of the Fishery Board for Scotland provide an insight into the state of fishing from Kirtomy and Farr in the years before the First World War. The catch typically consisted of cod and lobsters.

Fishery Statistics

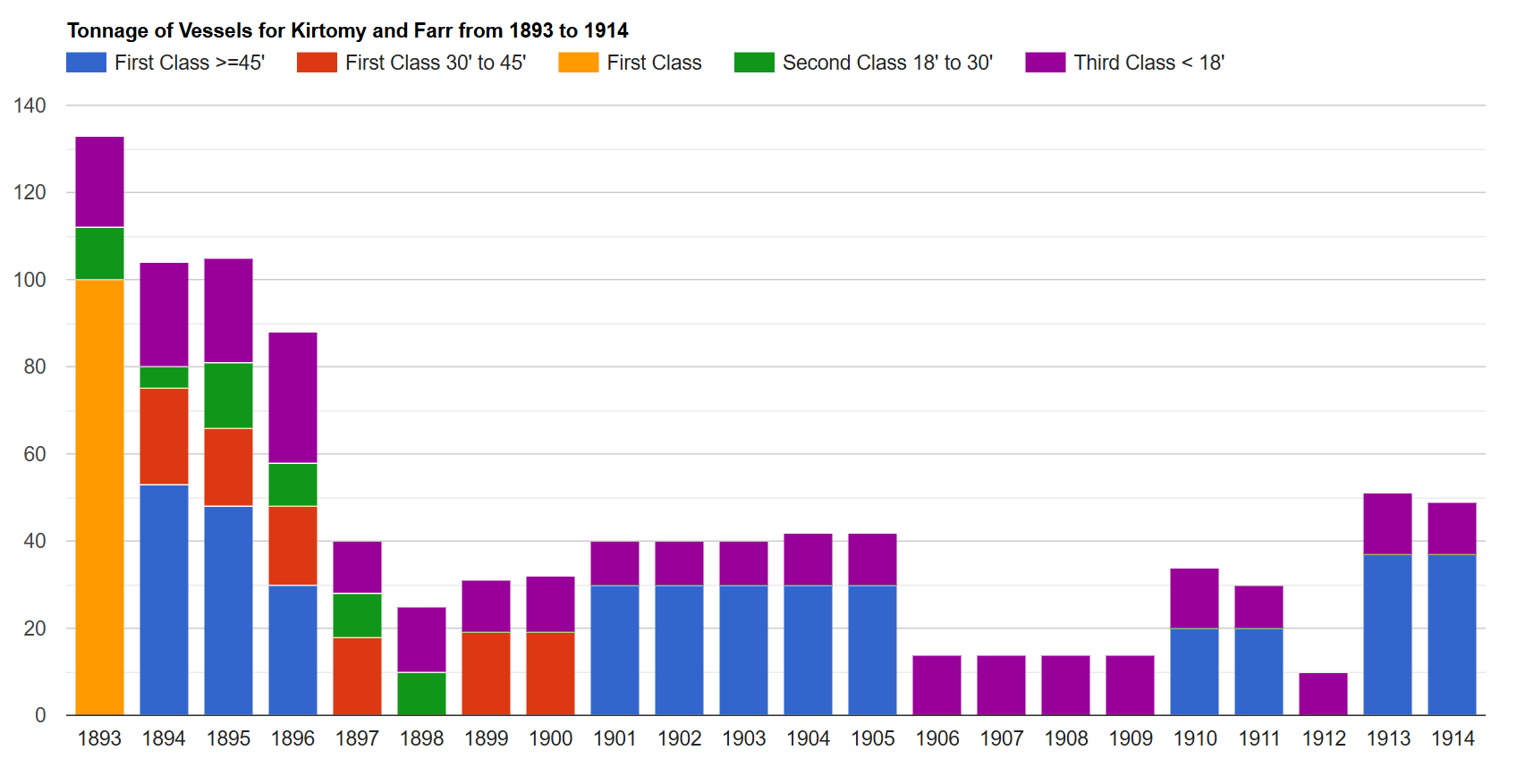
Tonnage of vessels

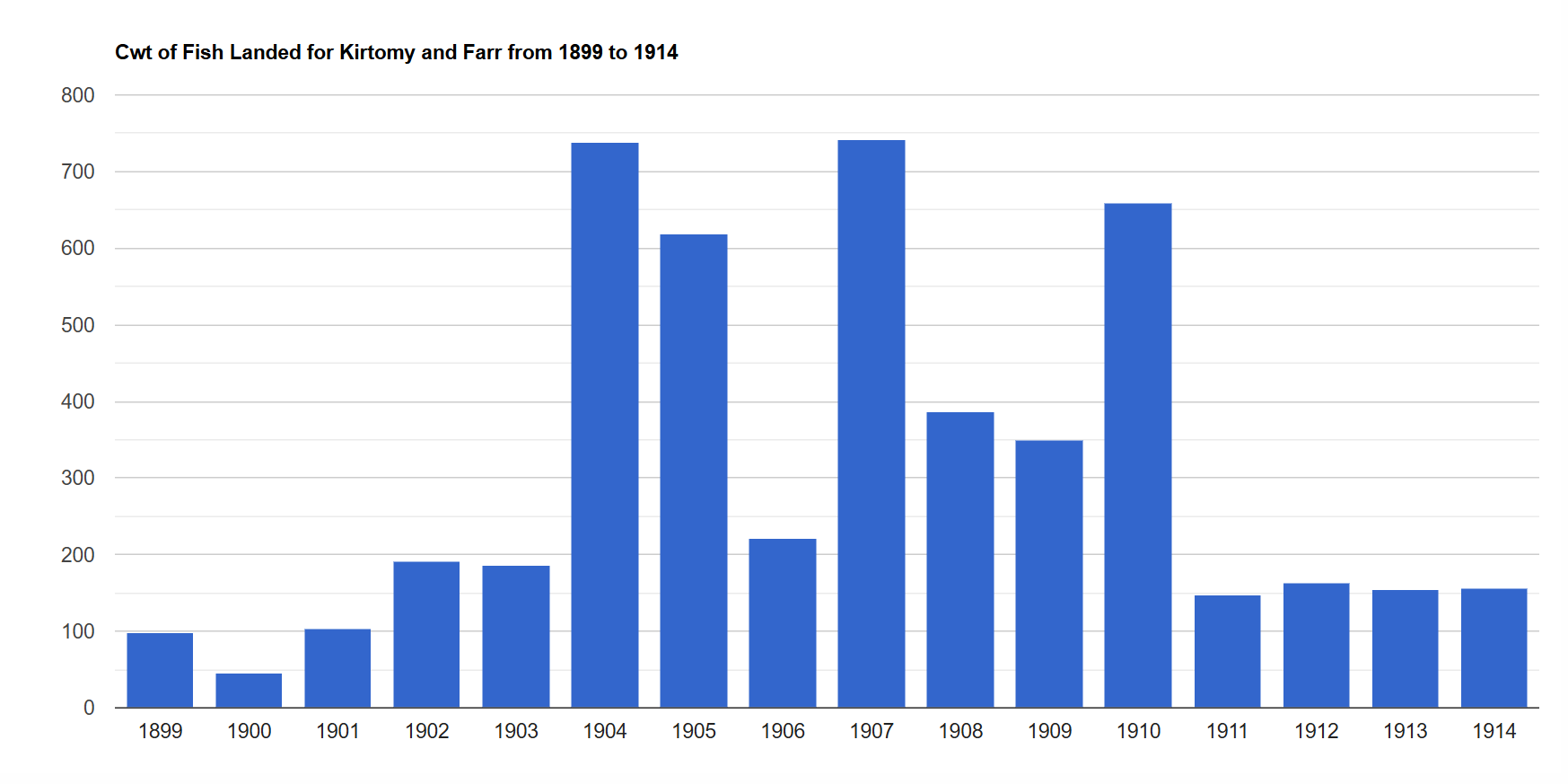
Cwt of fish landed

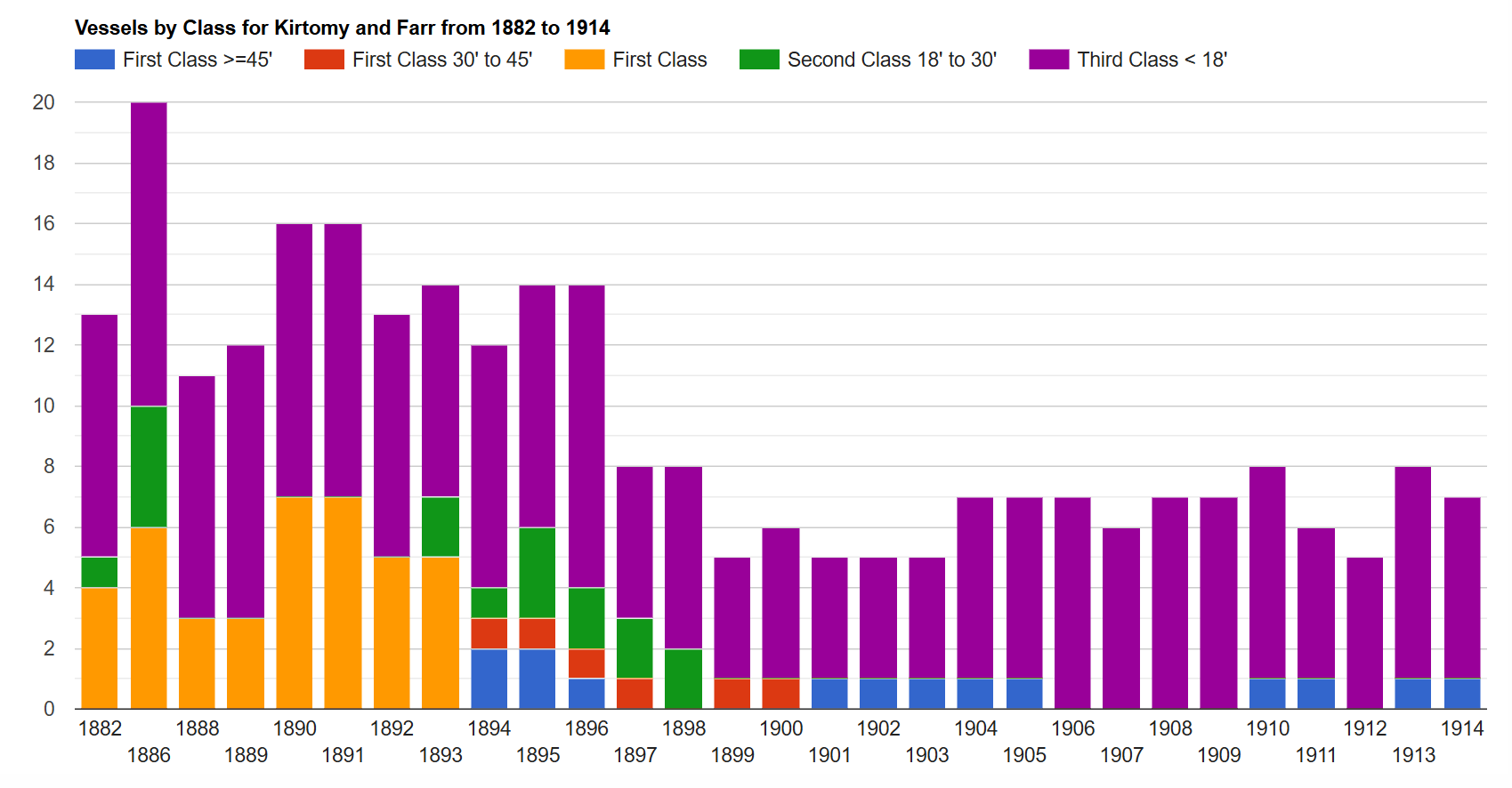
Vessels by class

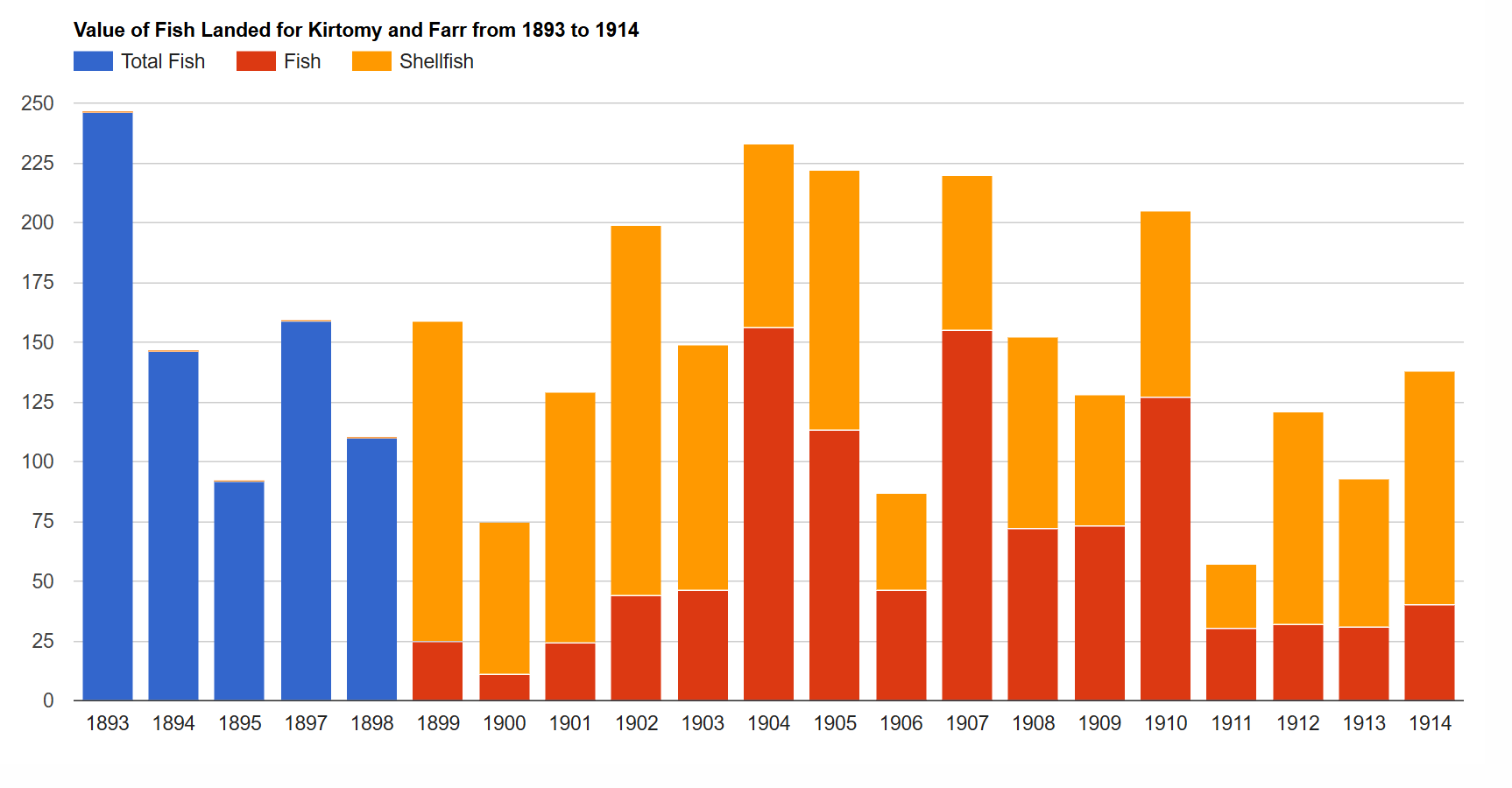
Value (£) of fish landed

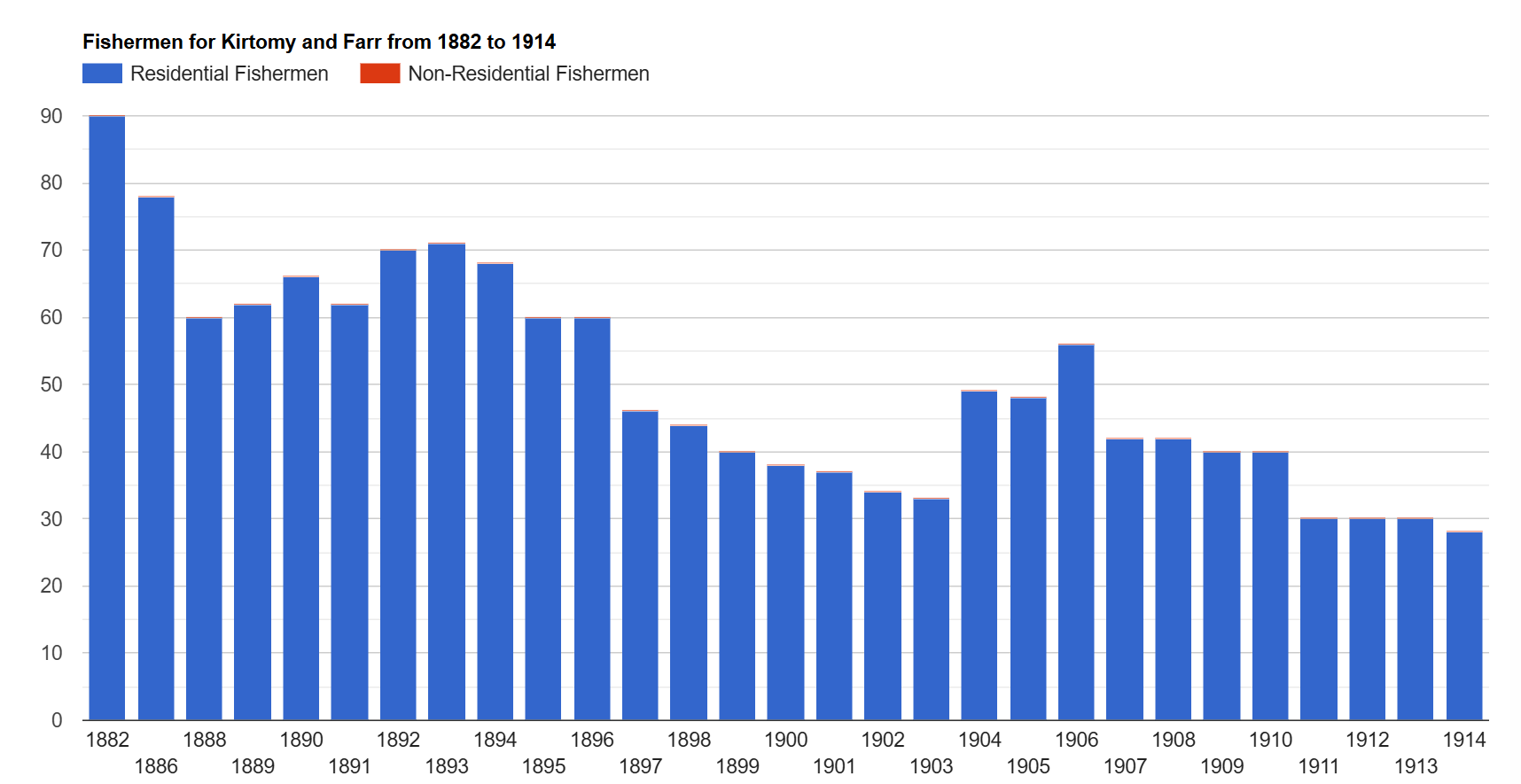
Fishermen

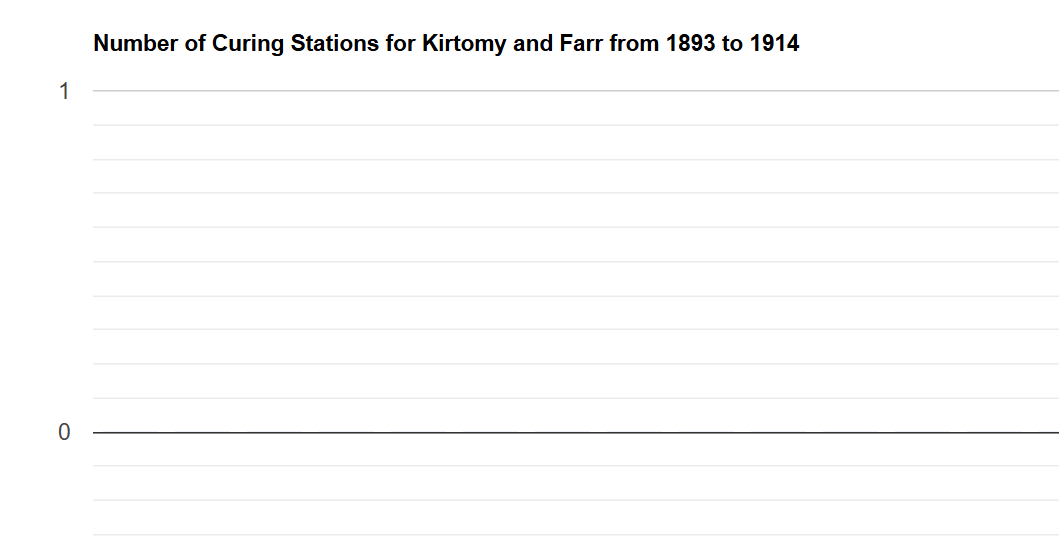
Placeholder - no curing stations
