= Kildonan =

Kildonan may refer to the following places:

== Canada ==
=== In Winnipeg ===
- East Kildonan
- North Kildonan
- West Kildonan
- Old Kildonan
- Kildonan (electoral district), a defunct provincial electoral district in Manitoba

=== Other places in Canada ===
- Kildonan, British Columbia, a locality near Alberni Inlet, British Columbia
- Kildonan Lake, British Columbia

== Scotland ==
- Kildonan, Skye, a location in Highland
- Kildonan, Sutherland, a parish containing the village of Helmsdale
  - Kildonan railway station
  - Strath of Kildonan, a valley
- Kildonan, Arran, a village on the island of Arran, North Ayrshire
  - Kildonan Castle
- Kildonan, Isle of South Uist, a crofting township on South Uist in the Outer Hebrides

== Zimbabwe ==
- Kildonan, Zimbabwe, a village in Mashonaland province
