= Achina =

Achina may refer to:

- Achina, Bhiwani, a village in India
- Achina, Anambra, a town in Nigeria
- Achina, Highland, a village in Scotland

== See also ==
- Achin (disambiguation)
