= Strathy =

Coordinates: 58.55°N 4.00°W

Strathy: Scottish Gaelic: Srathaidh
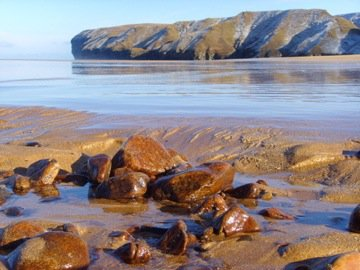
- Strathy

- Location within the Sutherland area
- OS grid reference: NC841650
- Civil parish: Farr
- Council area: Highland
- Lieutenancy area: Sutherland
- Country: Scotland
- Sovereign state: United Kingdom
- Post town: THURSO
- Postcode district: KW14
- Dialling code: 01641
- Police: Scotland
- Fire: Scottish
- Ambulance: Scottish
- UK Parliament: Caithness, Sutherland and Easter Ross
- Scottish Parliament: Caithness, Sutherland and Ross

Strathy (from Scottish Gaelic Srathaidh 'place of the strath') is a scattered community in Sutherland in the Scottish Highlands. The settlement emerged in the late 19th century as the north coast was populated by families forcibly displaced during the Highland Clearances.

Strathy is on the north coast of Scotland, on the A836 road some twenty miles west of Thurso. The village itself includes at least three distinct areas:

- Strathy East (on the right-hand side when passing through the village in the direction of Bettyhill, accessed by two roads leading towards Strathy Beach),
- Strathy West (immediately to the south of Strathy East)
- Strathy Point.

These generally enclose the rest of the village, mainly comprising Steven Terrace. If welcoming signposts are taken to represent the limits of the village, Strathy is contained in these areas. However, some would say that Strathy also takes in the settlement of Baligill to the east, and also Brawl, Aultiphurst and Laidnagullin to the west, essentially the entire community found between the Baligill Burn and the Armadale 'Big' Burn.

The Church of Scotland at Strathy has a prominent position on the approach to the village from the east.

The lighthouse at Strathy Point was built in 1958; it was the first in Scotland to run on electricity, and last built with the intention of being staffed. It ceased to operate in 2012.

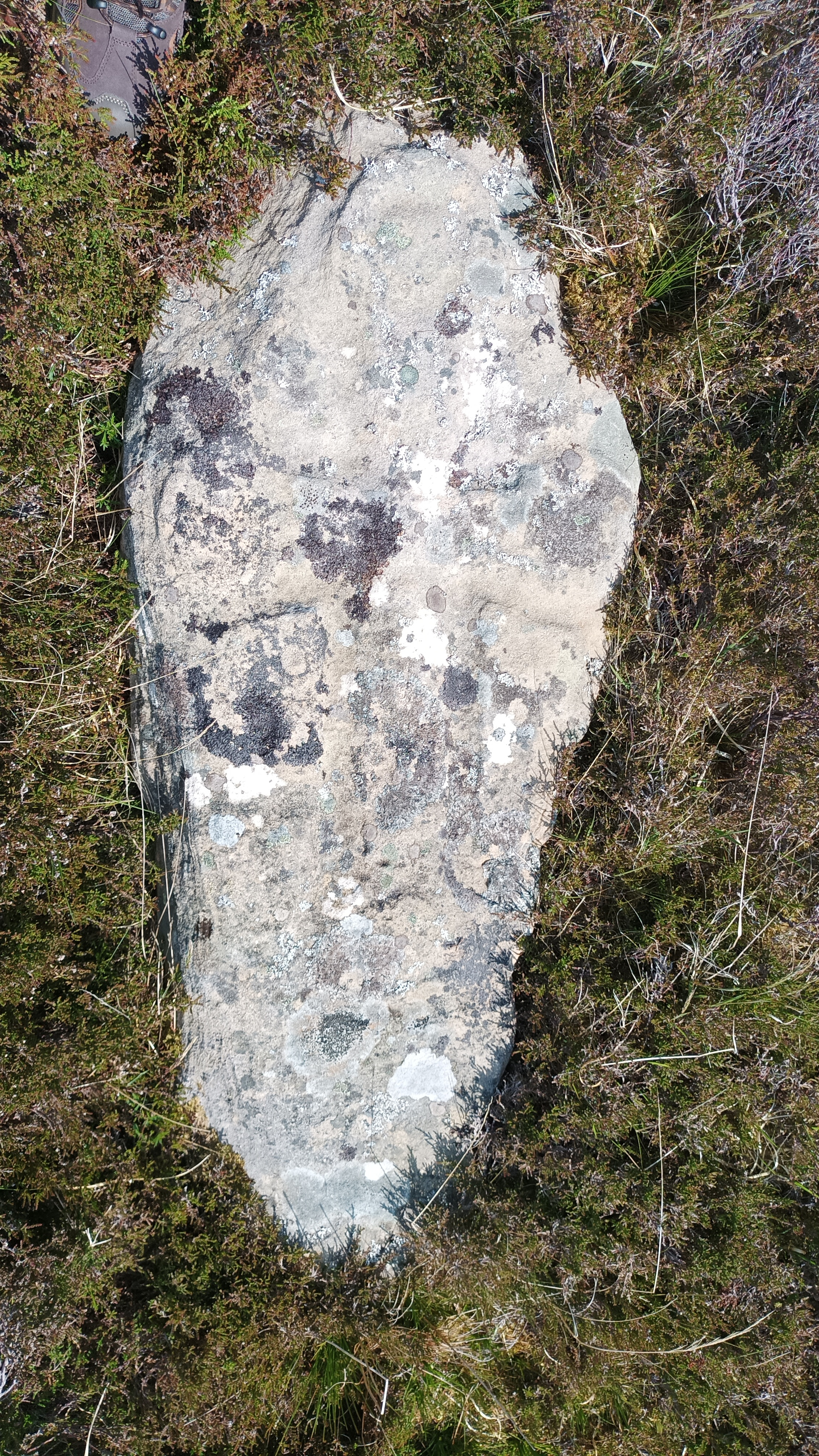
The priest's stone.

In the moorland at the south of the village is a limestone cross called "the priest's stone". It was described by Alexander Munro in 1900 as "absolutely unique among Scottish crosses", in that the deep cups at its four extremeties and centre seem to recall the "cups and rings" characteristic of similar pagan memorials, despite the monument's apparently Christian character. He speculated that it may date from the period of transition between paganism and Christianity in the area around the 7th century, although accepting that the absence of other evidence precluded any certainty. Local legend has it that disturbing the stone will result in a storm. Strathy's village hall contains a replica of the cross.

== Climate ==
Climate data for Strathy East, Elevation: 68 m (223 ft), 1991–2020 normals
Month	Jan	Feb	Mar	Apr	May	Jun	Jul	Aug	Sep	Oct	Nov	Dec	Year
Mean daily maximum °C (°F)	6.5 (43.7)	7.0 (44.6)	8.3 (46.9)	10.5 (50.9)	12.9 (55.2)	14.8 (58.6)	16.8 (62.2)	16.7 (62.1)	15.0 (59.0)	11.9 (53.4)	8.8 (47.8)	6.8 (44.2)	11.4 (52.5)
Daily mean °C (°F)	3.8 (38.8)	4.0 (39.2)	5.1 (41.2)	7.0 (44.6)	9.2 (48.6)	11.5 (52.7)	13.5 (56.3)	13.5 (56.3)	11.8 (53.2)	8.9 (48.0)	6.1 (43.0)	4.1 (39.4)	8.2 (46.8)
Mean daily minimum °C (°F)	1.1 (34.0)	1.1 (34.0)	1.9 (35.4)	3.5 (38.3)	5.3 (41.5)	8.3 (46.9)	10.2 (50.4)	10.3 (50.5)	8.5 (47.3)	6.0 (42.8)	3.4 (38.1)	1.3 (34.3)	5.1 (41.1)
Average precipitation mm (inches)	103.7 (4.08)	81.4 (3.20)	73.8 (2.91)	59.8 (2.35)	62.2 (2.45)	62.0 (2.44)	64.6 (2.54)	78.0 (3.07)	84.9 (3.34)	103.4 (4.07)	108.0 (4.25)	102.6 (4.04)	984.6 (38.76)
Average precipitation days (≥ 1.0 mm)	18.7	16.1	15.4	13.3	12.7	11.9	13.7	13.8	14.8	17.7	18.7	18.1	184.9
Mean monthly sunshine hours	38.6	68.5	103.2	150.7	196.5	150.3	146.3	139.1	112.1	79.2	47.6	30.1	1,262.3
Source: Met Office
