= Achiemore, Strath Halladale =

Coordinates: 58.49542°N 3.8975°W

Achiemore
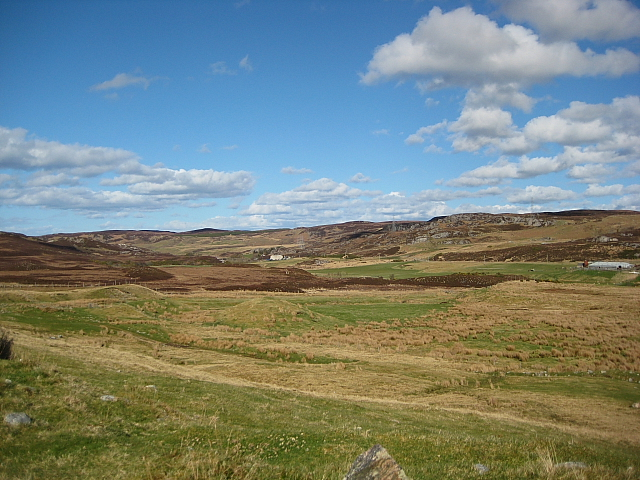
- Near Achiemore, Strath Halladale

- Location within the Sutherland area
- OS grid reference: NC894579
- Council area: Highland
- Lieutenancy area: Sutherland
- Country: Scotland
- Sovereign state: United Kingdom
- Post town: FORSINARD
- Postcode district: KW13
- Dialling code: 01641
- Police: Scotland
- Fire: Scottish
- Ambulance: Scottish
- UK Parliament: Caithness, Sutherland and Easter Ross
- Scottish Parliament: Caithness, Sutherland and Ross

Achiemore is a hamlet in Strath Halladale in Sutherland, in the Highland council area of Scotland. Achiemore is situated to the north of Smigel Burn on the right bank of the Halladale River just beyond where the Allt an Tigh-choinneirnh flows and Upper Bighouse. The village and station of Forsinard is 15 km to the south, and Melvich, on the north coast, is roughly 4.5 miles (7 km) to the north. Culfern is just to the north and contains ruins. The A897 road passes through Achiemore.

Achiemore contains the Strath Halladale Mission Church, a Grade C listed building which is dated to 1845. It is a rectangular rubble church with a long 4-bay elevation facing the A897 to the west. It became a listed building on 7 March 1984.

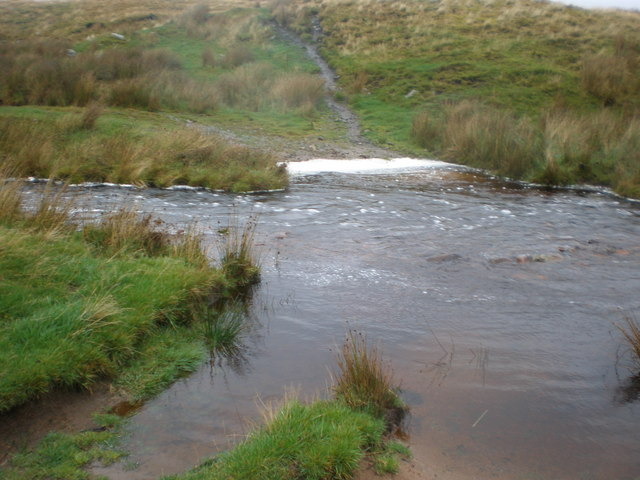
Ford across Allt an Tigh-choinneirnh as it joins the Halldale River, west of Achiemore
