= Swordly =

Coordinates: 58.53744°N 4.17644°W

Swordly: Scottish Gaelic: Suardailigh
- Location within the Sutherland area
- OS grid reference: NC733630
- Council area: Highland
- Lieutenancy area: Sutherland
- Country: Scotland
- Sovereign state: United Kingdom
- Post town: Thurso
- Postcode district: KW14 7
- Police: Scotland
- Fire: Scottish
- Ambulance: Scottish

Swordly (Scottish Gaelic: Suardailigh) is an extremely remote hamlet, located on the Bay of Swordly, on the north coastline of Scotland in Sutherland, Scottish Highlands and is in the Scottish council area of Highland.

The village of Bettyhill is located 2 miles west along the main A836 road. The villages of Farr and Crask lie directly west, and the village of Kirtomy, situated on Kirtomy Bay lies to the east.
