= List of shipwrecks in November 1882 =

The list of shipwrecks in November 1882 includes ships sunk, foundered, grounded, or otherwise lost during November 1882.

== 1 November ==
List of shipwrecks: 1 November 1882
Ship	State	Description
Arragon	United Kingdom	The steamship was wrecked in Fox Bay, Anticosti Island, Quebec, Canada. She was on a voyage from Bristol, Gloucestershire to Montreal, Quebec.
Ellen	United Kingdom	The smack foundered off Cardigan. Her three crew were rescued by the Cardigan Lifeboat John Stuart ( Royal National Lifeboat Institution).

== 2 November ==
List of shipwrecks: 2 November 1882
Ship	State	Description
Caranjah	United Kingdom	The full-rigged ship was damaged by fire at Buenos Aires, Argentina.
Clapeyron	France	The steamship was damaged by fire at Havre de Grâce, Seine-Inférieure.
Czernagora	United Kingdom	The steamship was wrecked at the mouth of the Bojana with some loss of life.
Fanny	Norway	The ship was wrecked at Bilbao, Spain.
Goalpara	India	The steamship was wrecked in the Hooghly River.
Howick	United Kingdom	The steamship was severely damaged by fire at Naples, Italy.
Laurel	United Kingdom	The ship sank at Hull, Yorkshire.
Pres de Mayo	Spain	The ship was wrecked at Bilbao. Her crew were rescued.
Providence	United Kingdom	The ship sank at Hull.
Quorra	United Kingdom	The steamship foundered in the Atlantic Ocean north east of Land's End, Cornwall with the presumed loss of all seventeen crew. She was on a voyage from Bilbao, spain to Bristol, Gloucestershire, according to a message written on a plank that washed up at Portreath, Cornwall.

== 3 November ==
List of shipwrecks: 3 November 1882
Ship	State	Description
Ardanbhan	United Kingdom	The steamship ran aground in Cartsdyke Bay. She was on a voyage from Bilbao, Spain to the Clyde. She was later refloated and taken in to Port Glasgow, Renfrewshire.
Bowfell	United Kingdom	The steamship departed from Troon, Ayrshire for Belfast, County Antrim. Presumed subsequently foundered with the loss of all hands; a boat washed ashore on 5 November.
Chieftain	United Kingdom	The barque was beached at Penarth, Glamorgan. She was on a voyage from Quebec City, Canada to Cardiff, Glamorgan.
Essex	United Kingdom	The ship was driven ashore at Harrington, Cumberland.
Forest Prince	United Kingdom	The ship foundered 20 nautical miles (37 km) off Start Point, Devon. Her five crew were rescued by the steamship Revival (United Kingdom). Forest Prince was on a voyage from Pomaron, Portugal to Bristol, Gloucestershire.
Gulf of Panama	United Kingdom	The steamship ran aground off the north coast of the Netherlands and was wrecked with the loss of 22 of her 27 crew. She was on a voyage from Simonachi, Japan to Bremen, Germany.
Huntress	United Kingdom	The ship was driven ashore at Workington, Cumberland.
Waterloo	United Kingdom	The schooner was driven ashore at Pont-Audemer, Eure, France.

== 4 November ==
List of shipwrecks: 4 November 1882
Ship	State	Description
Agathe	Norway	The barque struck a sunken wreck in Køge Bay. She was on a voyage from New York City, United States to Stettin, Germany. She put in to Copenhagen, Denmark.
Anna	Germany	The schooner was wrecked at "Luce Mirim", Brazil. Her crew were rescued. She was on a voyage from Hamburg to Porto Alegre, Brazil.
Duke of Westminster	United Kingdom	The steamship put in to Malta on fire. She was on a voyage from London to Calcutta, India.
Medea	United Kingdom	The steamship was driven ashore at Camber Coastguard Station, Sussex. Sixteen of her crew were taken off by the Rye Lifeboat, her captain remaining onboard. Medea was on a voyage from Honfleur, Manche, France to Sunderland, County Durham.
Westella	United Kingdom	The steamship was driven ashore at Lytham St. Annes, Lancashire. She was on a voyage from Liverpool to Cardiff, Glamorgan. She was refloated on 14 November and taken in to Liverpool, Lancashire.
Winchelsea Lifeboat	Royal National Lifeboat Institution	The lifeboat capsized twice whilst going to the assistance of the steamship Medea (United Kingdom) with the loss of a crew member.

== 5 November ==
List of shipwrecks: 5 November 1882
Ship	State	Description
Agra	Norway	The barque was driven ashore and sank at Dragør.
Alert	United Kingdom	The tender collided with the tug Great Emperor (United Kingdom) in the River Mersey and was severely damaged.
Rydall Hall	United Kingdom	The steamship was driven ashore at Holyhead, Anglesey. She was on a voyage from Liverpool, Lancashire to Kurrachee, India. She was refloated with the assistance of four tugs.

== 6 November ==
List of shipwrecks: 6 November 1882
Ship	State	Description
Alexander	Sweden	The steamship ran aground and sank at Sandhamn.
Glenrath	United Kingdom	The steamship ran ashore at Suez, Egypt. She was on a voyage from Samarang, Netherlands East Indies to Port Said, Egypt.
Isis	United States	The steamship sank in Lake George in a gale. Three crew were killed.
Jane and Elizabeth	United Kingdom	The smack was driven ashore and wrecked near Portreath, Cornwall with the loss of all hands.
Lagos	United Kingdom	The steamship was driven ashore at Torekov, Sweden. She was on a voyage from Hull, Yorkshire to Riga, Russia.
Sunbeam	United Kingdom	The lighter sank off Dunoon, Argyllshire with the loss of a crew member. She was on a voyage from Toward, Argyllshire to Greenock, Renfrewshire.

== 7 November ==
List of shipwrecks: 7 November 1882
Ship	State	Description
Argo	United Kingdom	The ship was wrecked. She was on a voyage from Riga, Russia to Burghhead, Moray.
Captain McClintock	United Kingdom	The steamship ran ashore on Burial Island, County Down. She was on a voyage from Ardrossan, Ayrshire to Dublin. She was refloated.
Coral Queen	United Kingdom	The steamship ran aground at Redcar, Yorkshire. She was on a voyage from Gothenburg, Sweden to Hartlepool, County Durham. She was refloated.
Delata	Russia	The schooner was driven ashore and wrecked at Lemvig, Denmark. She was on a voyage from Hull, Yorkshire to Malmö, Sweden.
Friedrich Ludvig	Germany	The ship was driven ashore at Torekov, Sweden. She was on a voyage from a Scottish port to Stettin.
Hullfield	Norway	The brig was driven ashore and wrecked at Lemvig, Denmark. She was on a voyage from Kragerø to Dieppe, Seine-Inférieure, France.

== 8 November ==
List of shipwrecks: 8 November 1882
Ship	State	Description
Ella	Germany	The full-rigged ship foundered in the Atlantic Ocean. Her 33 crew took to three boats; five crew in one boat were rescued by the barque North American (Norway). Those in the other two boats were reported missing. Ella was on a voyage from New York City, United States to Bremen.
Vivid	United Kingdom	The lugger collided with the lugger Young Alfred (United Kingdom) and sank off Lowestoft, Suffolk.

== 9 November ==
List of shipwrecks: 9 November 1882
Ship	State	Description
Maria Josephine	United Kingdom	The brigantine ran aground on the Lemon Sand, in the North Sea and sank with the loss of three of her crew. Survivors were rescued by a smack She was on a voyage from South Shields, County Durham to Whitstable, Kent.

== 11 November ==
List of shipwrecks: 11 November 1882
Ship	State	Description
Austral	United Kingdom	Austral The ship sank at her mooring in Neutral Bay, off Kirribilli Point in Sydney Harbour, New South Wales. Five crew were killed in the incident. The ship was raised and sailed to Glasgow, Renfrewshire for refit.

== 13 November ==
List of shipwrecks: 13 November 1882
Ship	State	Description
Charles Phillips	United Kingdom	The smack was driven ashore at Gore Point, near Porlock, Somerset. She broke up the next day.
two crewmen and two passengers	survived, and her cargo of provisions, dry goods, and firewood was salvaged, but she was deemed a total loss.	The schooner dragged her anchor and was blown against a steep bluff on the coast of Chernabura Island, Shumagin Islands, Department of Alaska(54°47′N 159°33′W), tearing a hole in her side. All four people aboard
Heather Bell	United Kingdom	The ship collided with Vesuvius (United Kingdom) in the River Mersey and was severely damaged. Heather Bell was on a voyage from Larne, County Antrim to Liverpool, Lancashire. She completed her voyage.
Trebiskin	United Kingdom	The ship was run into by the schooner Annie (United Kingdom) at Padstow, Cornwall and was severely damaged.
Westphalia, and an unnamed vessel	Germany; Flag unknown	The steamship Westphalia collided with another steamship in the English Channel 15 nautical miles (28 km) south of Beachy Head, Sussex, United Kingdom and was severely damaged. Westphalia was on a voyage from New York City, United States to Hamburg. She put in to Portsmouth, Hampshire, United Kingdom, where her 70 passengers were landed. The other steamship sank with the loss of all hands.
135	Russia	The schooner was driven ashore on Anholt, Denmark. She was on a voyage from Tayport, Fife, United Kingdom to Pärnu. She was refloated and taken in to Helsingør, Denmark in a leaky condition.

== 14 November ==
List of shipwrecks: 14 November 1882
Ship	State	Description
Alecta	United Kingdom	The steamship struck rocks and sank in the English Channel off Cape Levi, France. Her crew were rescued. She was on a voyage from Dover, Kent to Bristol, Gloucestershire.
Amalia and Hedwig	Germany	The barque collided with Columbia (Flag unknown) at off Le Verdon-sur-Mer, Gironde, France and was severely damaged. Amalia and Hedwig was on a voyage from Bordeaux, Gironde to Newport, Monmouthshire, United Kingdom.
Burton	Norway	The ship was wrecked on the Holm Sand, in the North Sea off the coast of Suffolk, United Kingdom. Her eight crew were rescued by the Lowestoft Lifeboat. She was on a voyage from "Solnesund" to Sheerness, Kent, United Kingdom.

== 15 November ==
List of shipwrecks: 15 November 1882
Ship	State	Description
Dahomey	United Kingdom	The brigantine foundered off Margate, Kent while bound for Oporto. The captain, his wife and the four crew were landed at Margate.
Rudolph	United Kingdom	The ship ran aground on the Pye Sand, in the North Sea off the coast of Essex. She was on a voyage from Rønne, Denmark to Ipswich, Suffolk. She was refloated with assistance on 20 November and was assisted in to Harwich, Essex the next day by the smack Aufait and the yawls Angler and Reward (all United Kingdom).
Sophie and Amalie	Denmark	The ship departed from Iceland for Copenhagen. No further trace, reported missing.

== 16 November ==
List of shipwrecks: 16 November 1882
Ship	State	Description
Elizabeth	United Kingdom	The schooner was wrecked on Ramsey Island, Pembrokeshire with the loss of all hands. She was on a voyage from Portmadoc, Caernarfonshire to Cardiff, Glamorgan.
Florist	United Kingdom	The ship was abandoned 4 nautical miles (7.4 km) north east of the Cardigan Bay Lighstship ( Trinity House) with the loss of three of her six crew. Survivors were rescued by the steamship George Moore (United Kingdom). Florist was on a voyage from Cardiff to Belfast, County Antrim.
James and Elizabeth	United Kingdom	The smack capsized and was driven ashore at Hell's Mouth, Cornwall.
Karl and Ericht	Netherlands	The schooner capsized 1 nautical mile (1.9 km) off the Mouse Lightship ( Trinity House) with the loss of her captain. Four survivors were rescued by the steamship Indus (United Kingdom). Karl and Ericht was on a voyage from Stettin, Germany to London, United Kingdom
Nerissa	Germany	The steamship collided with the steam collier Harvest Queen in the River Thames at Tilbury, Essex, United Kingdom and was severely damaged. Nerissa was beached. She was on a voyage from Hamburg to London.
Quayside	United Kingdom	The brig was abandoned off Great Yarmouth, Norfolk. Her crew were rescued by the Great Yarmouth Lifeboat. She was on a voyage from South Shields, County Durham to Sheerness, Kent.
Santas	Sweden	The ship was abandoned in the North Sea. Her seven crew were rescued by the barque Johannes (Norway). Santas was on a voyage from Pärnu, Russia to Schiedam, South Holland, Netherlands.
Santos	United Kingdom	The ship was wrecked. Her crew survived.
St. Marthe	United Kingdom	The smack was driven ashore at St Issey, Cornwall.
Susan and Elizabeth	United Kingdom	The schooner was wrecked on the Western Spit, in St Ives Bay. Her crew were rescued by rocket apparatus.
Venus	United Kingdom	The schooner foundered in the Atlantic Ocean 190 nautical miles (350 km) south west of The Lizard, Cornwall with the loss of five of her eight crew. Survivors were rescued by Daphne (Sweden). Venus was on a voyage from Savannah, Georgia, United States to Falmouth, Cornwall.
Winton	United Kingdom	The steamship foundered 30 nautical miles (56 km) north of Ouessant, Finistère, France. The crew took to two whaleboats which capsized at the entrance to the port of Argenton, Finistère with the loss of 27 lives. One man survived. Winton was on a voyage from Odesa, Russia to Rotterdam, South Holland.
Hayle Lifeboat	Royal National Lifeboat Institution	The lifeboat capsizes whilst going to the assistance of a brig. Her crew survived.
Unnamed	United Kingdom	The brig sank near St Ives Head, Cornwall, while attempting a run for one of St Ives beaches. All hands were lost.
Unnamed	United Kingdom	The ship was driven ashore and wrecked at Hayle, Cornwall. Her crew were rescued.
Unnamed	Flag unknown	The ship was driven ashore near the Godrevy Lighthouse, Cornwall.
Unnamed	United States	The barge was run down by a steamboat and sank at New York City with the loss of seven lives.

== 18 November ==
List of shipwrecks: 18 November 1882
Ship	State	Description
Condor	Russia	The barque hit the Vorses, on the outer part of The Manacles, Cornwall, United Kingdom and fell on her portside. The captain, first mate and nine crew put off in the ship's boat for the shore leaving five onboard, who were rescued by two local cutters, just before the masts fell leaving all of the vessel underwater.

== 19 November ==
List of shipwrecks: 19 November 1882
Ship	State	Description
Lamershagen	Germany	The ship was driven ashore at Pwlldu Bay, Glamorgan, United Kingdom. All twenty-one people on board survived. She was on a voyage from Hamburg to Swansea, Glamorgan. Lamershagen broke in two the next day.

== 20 November ==
List of shipwrecks: 20 November 1882
Ship	State	Description
Dazzler	United Kingdom	The tug was driven ashore at Rosslare, County Wexford. Her six crew were rescued by the Wexford Lifeboat.
Isabellas	United Kingdom	The schooner was run into by Annie Sophia (United Kingdom) at Whitstable, Kent and was severely damaged.

== 21 November ==
List of shipwrecks: 21 November 1882
Ship	State	Description
Annie	United Kingdom	The ship was wrecked at Audierne, Finistère, France. She was on a voyage from Cardiff, Glamorgan to Mauritius.
Wearmouth	United Kingdom	The steamship was wrecked in the Magdalen Islands, Nova Scotia, Canada with the loss of sixteen of the twenty people on board. She was on a voyage from Quebec City, Canada to London.

== 23 November ==
List of shipwrecks: 23 November 1882
Ship	State	Description
Drounengen	Norway	The barque was wrecked at the mouth of the River Shannon. She was on a voyage from Glasgow, Renfrewshire, United Kingdom to New York City, United States.

== 24 November ==
List of shipwrecks: 24 November 1882
Ship	State	Description
Belted Will	United Kingdom	The barque was driven ashore and severely damaged at Ascension Island. She was on a voyage from Manila, Spanish East Indies to London. She was refloated and taken in to harbour.
James W Barber	Belgium	The steamship was wrecked near Cape Finisterre, Spain.

== 25 November ==
List of shipwrecks: 25 November 1882
Ship	State	Description
Bombay	India	The tug collided with Thalatta (United Kingdom) and sank at the Sand Heads. Her crew survived.
Catherine Morgan	United Kingdom	The schooner foundered off the Varne Lightvessel ( Trinity House). Her crew were rescued. She was on a voyage from South Shields, County Durham to Plymouth, Devon.
Shakespeare	United Kingdom	The full-rigged ship was wrecked on Inaccessible Island, Tristan da Cunha. All on board survived. She was on a voyage from Cardiff, Glamorgan to Calcutta, India.

== 26 November ==
List of shipwrecks: 26 November 1882
Ship	State	Description
Bruno	Germany	The brig foundered at sea. Her crew were rescued. She was on a voyage from Newcastle upon Tyne, Northumberland, United Kingdom to Stettin.
Cambronne	France	The steamship was run into by the steamship Marion (United Kingdom) off Lundy Island, Devon, United Kingdom and sank with the loss of fourteen of her eighteen crew. Cambronne was on a voyage from Cardiff, Glamorgan, United Kingdom to Havre de Grâce, Seine-Inférieure.
Elizabeth Dougall	United Kingdom	The ship departed from the River Tyne for Caldera, Chile. No further trace, reported missing.

== 27 November ==
List of shipwrecks: 27 November 1882
Ship	State	Description
Roumania	United Kingdom	The ship was abandoned in the Atlantic Ocean. Her eighteen crew were rescued by the steamship Phoenecian (United Kingdom). Roumania was on a voyage from Quebec City, Canada to Liverpool, Lancashire.

== 28 November ==
List of shipwrecks: 28 November 1882
Ship	State	Description
Clymene	United Kingdom	The steamship was run into by the steamship Notting Hill (United Kingdom) at Gibraltar and was beached.
Percy	Russia	The brig stranded on the Goodwin Sands, Kent, United Kingdom with the loss of four of her seven crew. Survivors were rescued by the Ramsgate Lifeboat.

== 29 November ==
List of shipwrecks: 29 November 1882
Ship	State	Description
Ellen Rickmers	Germany	The ship collided with the schooner Guide (United Kingdom) and sank 1 nautical mile (1.9 km) off Plymouth, Devon, United Kingdom. All on board were rescued by Guide and a fishing boat.
Jane Cochrane	United Kingdom	The ship ran aground at Cullen, Moray.
St George	United Kingdom	The steamship foundered 25 nautical miles (46 km) off Portreath, Cornwall with the loss of twelve of the nineteen people on board. She was on a voyage from Swansea, Glamorgan to Nantes, Loire-Inférieure, France.

== 30 November ==
List of shipwrecks: 30 November 1882
Ship	State	Description
Barnsley, and St. Donats	United Kingdom	The steamships collided and were both severely damaged. Barnsley was on a voyage from Odesa, Russia to Antwerp, Belgium. She was beached on the Ballastplaat, but was subsequently refloated with assistance. St. Donats was on a voyage from Carloforte, Sardinia, Italy to Antwerp.
Cedar Grove	United Kingdom	The steamship was wrecked at Cape Canso, Nova Scotia, Canada. All 33 people on board took to three boats, but five of them were lost. Cedar Grove was on a voyage from London to Halifax, Nova Scotia.
Folger	United States	The schooner was wrecked in Lake Michigan with the loss of all nine crew.
Martha	United Kingdom	The ship departed from Newport, Monmouthshire for New Ross, County Wexford. No further trace, reported missing.

== Unknown date ==
List of shipwrecks: Unknown date in November 1882
Ship	State	Description
Acastus	United Kingdom	The ship parted her anchors in the Swin and probably went ashore on the sands with the loss of ten crew, who were nearly all married women.
Althea	United Kingdom	The brig was driven ashore at Musquash, New Brunswick, Canada. She was on a voyage from Saint John, New Brunswick to Youghal, County Cork.
Andrea	Italy	The barque ran aground on the Balg Sand, in the North Sea. She was on a voyage from Bremen, Germany to Cardiff, Glamorgan, United Kingdom. She was refloated and towed in to the Nieuwe Diep.
Anne Beal	United Kingdom	The ship foundered off the Azores. Her ten crew survived.
Avon	United Kingdom	The ship was lost in a gale. The crew were mostly made up of married women.
Cavalier	United Kingdom	The ship ran aground at Findhorn, Moray. She was on a voyage from Christiania, Norway to Dingwall, Ross-shire. She was later refloated, and resumed her voyage on 15 November.
Cekrops	Denmark	The schooner was abandoned at sea. Her crew were rescued. She was on a voyage from Dysart, Fife, United Kingdom to Fredrikshavn.
Collingwood	United States	The schooner was wrecked in Lake Michigan with the loss of four of her seven crew.
Edwin	United Kingdom	The steamship was driven ashore at Dunkirk, Nord, France. She was on a voyage from Bombay, India to Dunkirk. She was refloated and taken in to Dunkirk.
Eliza Smeed	United Kingdom	The barque was driven ashore at Cape Egmont, Prince Edward Island, Canada.
Ernest	France	The barque was abandoned at sea before 13 November.
Exact	(United Kingdom of Great Britain and Ireland) Guernsey	The ship foundered in the North Sea before 17 November. A boat with the corpse of a crew member inside came ashore on Vlieland, Friesland, Netherlands on that date.
Fatfield	United Kingdom	The steamship collided with another vessel in the River Thames and was beached at Dagenham, Essex.
Fjerde November	Norway	The ship was abandoned in the North Sea.
Gloriana	United Kingdom	The tug was driven ashore and wrecked at Kildonan Castle, Isle of Arran. Her crew survived.
Gustav Friedrich Focking	Germany	The ship was driven ashore. She was on a voyage from Liverpool, Lancashire, United Kingdom to Danzig. She was refloated and taken in to Danzig.
Hercules	Norway	The barque was wrecked at Sundsvall, Sweden with some loss of life. She was on a voyage from Piteå, Sweden to East Hartlepool, County Durham, United Kingdom.
Highflyer	United Kingdom	The ship was abandoned in the Atlantic Ocean. Her crew were rescued. She was on a voyage from Saint John's, Newfoundland Colony to Naples, Italy.
Ischia	United Kingdom	The steamship was wrecked in the Straits of Babel Maadeb north west of Perim, Aden Settlement. Her crew were rescued by the steamship Stilrio (Flag unknown). Ischia was on a voyage from Bombay to Liverpool.
Jane and Susan	United Kingdom	The ship was driven ashore and wrecked at Nash Point, Glamorgan. She was on a voyage from the Dunraven Castle, Glamorgan to Bristol, Gloucestershire.
Katland	Norway	The brig was driven ashore at Great Yarmouth, Norfolk, United Kingdom. Her crew were rescued. She was on a voyage from Härnösand, Sweden to Caen, Calvados, France.
Mexico	Germany	The steamship was driven ashore. She was on a voyage from "Neumuchlen" to Danzig. She was refloated and taken in to Danzig, where she arrived on 4 November.
Navarre	France	The steamship was driven ashore near "Carry", Bouches-du-Rhône before 24 November. She was on a voyage from the River Plate to Marseille, Bouches-du-Rhône.
Naworth	United Kingdom	The barque ran aground off Bahía Blanca, Argentina and was damaged. She was on a voyage from Glasgow, Renfrewshire to Buenos Aires, Argentina. She was refloated with the assistance of an Argentinian Navy man-of-war.
Ocean Bride	United Kingdom	The schooner was driven ashore at Granville, Manche, France. She was on a voyage from Swansea, Glamorgan to Granville.
P. Caland	Netherlands	The steamship was driven ashore at Vlissingen, Zeeland. She was on a voyage from New York City, United States to Rotterdam, South Holland, Netherlands.
Petroslana	Austria-Hungary	The barque was wrecked off Milford Haven, Pembrokeshire, United Kingdom with the loss of all twelve crew. She was on a voyage from Cardiff, Glamorgan to Pola.
Speranza	Italy	The ship was wrecked near Famagusta, Cyprus.
Thomasino	Spain	The brig was driven ashore at the Pointe La Coubre, Charente-Inférieure, France with the loss of three of her twelve crew.
Tonette	Norway	The brig was driven ashore on Öland, Sweden. She was on a voyage from Vyborg, Grand Duchy of Finland to Sunderland, County Durham, United Kingdom. She was refloated and taken in to Copenhagen, Denmark.
Uller	Norway	The schooner was abandoned at sea before 6 November. Her crew were rescued. She was on a voyage from Fredrikstadt to Brussels, West Flanders, Belgium.
Widgeon	United Kingdom	The ship was driven ashore at Pakefield, Suffolk. Her crew were rescued. She was on a voyage from Chatham, Kent to Warkworth, Northumberland.
Witzel	United States	The tug exploded and was destroyed while racing another tug near Racine, Wisconsin. Her owner and two engineers were killed.
W J Taylor	United Kingdom	The steamship was in a collision in the River Thames off Rotherhithe, Surrey.
Unnamed	Germany	The barque went ashore on the Gunfleet Sands, in the North Sea off the coast of Essex.
Unnamed	Spain	A vessel foundered in a gale and was found floating bottom up near Gibraltar. John Marychurch (Flag unknown) rescued five crew.
Unnamed	United Kingdom	The pilot boat foundered off Burntisland, Fife with the loss of all five people on board.
