= Achin =

Achin may refer to:

- Achin District, in Nangarhar Province, Afghanistan
- A previous name of Aceh, Indonesia
- Middle name of Hans Litten (1903–1938), German lawyer
- Nancy Achin Sullivan (1959-2022), American politician

== See also ==
- Achina (disambiguation)
