= Aultiphurst =

Coordinates: 58.56258°N 4.05553°W

- Location within the Sutherland area
- Population: 3
- OS grid reference: NC805656
- Council area: Highland
- Lieutenancy area: Sutherland
- Country: Scotland
- Sovereign state: United Kingdom
- Post town: Thurso
- Postcode district: KW14
- Dialling code: 01641
- Police: Scotland
- Fire: Scottish
- Ambulance: Scottish
- UK Parliament: Caithness, Sutherland and Easter Ross
- Scottish Parliament: Caithness, Sutherland and Ross

Aultiphurst (Scottish Gaelic: Allt a' Phuirt), in Strathy, Sutherland, is a village in the Scottish Highlands

The name Aultiphurst is a misspelling of Allt a' Phuirt, which is Gaelic meaning a "stream" (ullt) of the (a), port (phuirt).

Aultiphurst was settled as a clearance village mostly from the Naver Highland clearances. During the 19th century, more than 30 people worked several crofts belonging to the Mackays. Given its location exposed to occasional fierce winds from the Arctic, it is poor cropland, and has traditionally been used for grazing sheep, mostly Texels and Cheviot breeds.

The land around Aultiphurst is part of the Strathy Point and Laidnagullin common grazings. This is managed by the grazings committee and is owned by the Scottish Department of Agriculture.

The crofts at Aultiphurst are named "Armadale croft 12, 11, 10, 9 and 8" on the old titles. All the crofts in Aultiphurst and Brawl were associated previously with Armadale. Sheep regularly drown in the wettest parts of the surrounding bogland. Aultiphurst accepts occasional overnight campers.

Aultiphurst is in the Scottish council area of Highland.

== See also ==
- Badbea, clearance village in Caithness
