= Crask =

Coordinates: 58.531°N 4.197°W

Crask: Scottish Gaelic: An Crasg / A' Chrasg
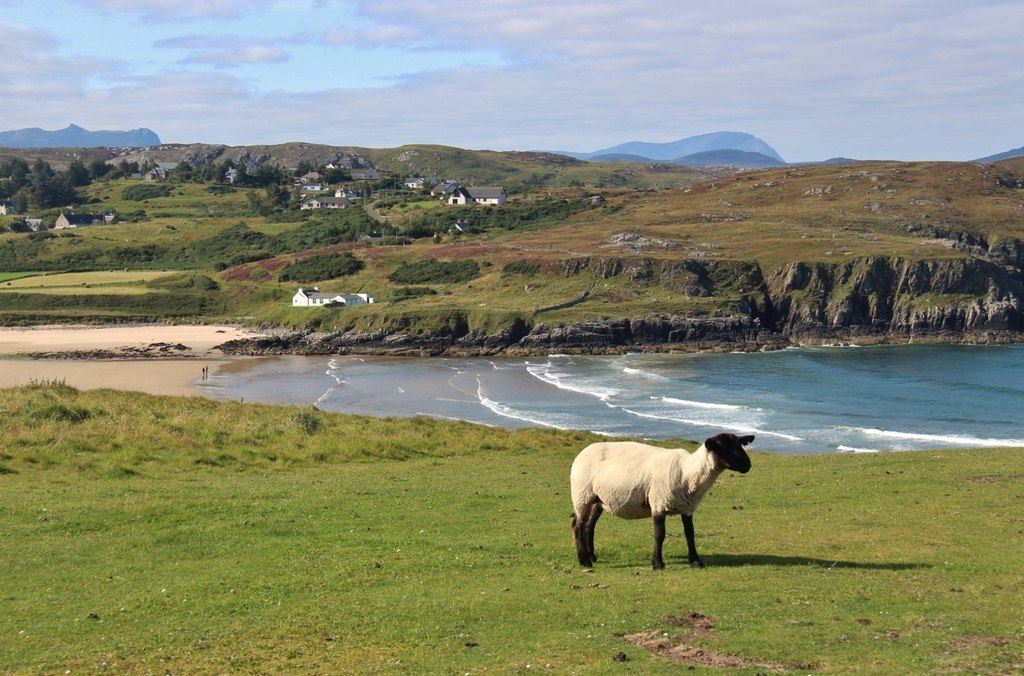
- A view of Farr Bay looking from Crask.

- Location within the Sutherland area
- OS grid reference: NC721625
- Council area: Highland
- Lieutenancy area: Sutherland
- Country: Scotland
- Sovereign state: United Kingdom
- Post town: Bettyhill
- Postcode district: KW14 7
- Police: Scotland
- Fire: Scottish
- Ambulance: Scottish

Crask, n Scottish Gaelic, crask is derived from crasg (or a' chrasg), meaning a "crossing," "crossing place," or "pass". This includes places like The Crask Inn, in Sutherland.

Also, Crask is a small remote hamlet, situated on Farr Bay in the Scottish Highlands, on the shore of northern Sutherland in the Scottish council area of Highland.

The village of Bettyhill lies less than one mile (1.6 km) to the west along the A836 road. The village of Farr is situated immediately to the east. It is the fictional setting on the West coast of Scotland, used in John Buchan's novel John Macnab.

The area is primarily used for farming and agriculture, with a few remote farms.
