= Donnán of Eigg =

Gaelic priest

Saint Donnán of Eigg
- Born: Probably in Ireland
- Died: 17 April, A.D. 617; Eigg
- Feast: 17 April
- Patronage: Eigg

Saint Donnán of Eigg (also known as Donan; died 17 April 617) was a Gaelic priest, likely from Ireland, who attempted to introduce Christianity to the Picts of northwestern Scotland during the Early Middle Ages. Donnán is the patron saint of Eigg, the island in the Inner Hebrides where he was killed.

The Martyrology of Donegal, compiled by Michael O'Clery in the 17th century, records the manner of his death:

"Donnan, of Ega, Abbott. Ega [Eigg] is the name of an island in which he was, after his coming from Érin [Ireland]. And there came robbers of the sea on a certain time to the island when he was celebrating Mass. He requested of them not to kill him until he should have the mass said, and they gave him this respite; and he was afterwards beheaded and fifty-two of his monks along with him. And all their names are in a certain old book of the old books of Erin, A.D.616."

Another tradition states that a pagan Pictish queen had him and 150 others burnt. He is thought to be buried at Kildonan, on the Isle of Arran. Saint Donnán's feast day is 17 April.

The Hiberno-Latin account in the Book of Leinster says: 'Eigg is the name of a spring in Aldasain. And there Donnán and his community suffered martyrdom. This is how it came about. A rich woman used to dwell there before the coming of Donnán and her flocks grazed there. On account of the ill-feeling she had towards Donnán and his community, she persuaded a number of bandits to kill him. When these bandits arrived in Eigg, they found them chanting their psalms in the oratory and they could not kill them there. Donnán however said to his community: 'Let us go into the refectory so that these men may be able to kill us there where we do our living according to the demands of the body; since as long as we remain where we have done our all to please God, we cannot die, but where we have served the body, we may pay the price of the body.' In this way, therefore, they were killed in their refectory on the eve of Easter. Fifty-four others died together alongside Donnán'.

== Places bearing his name ==
- Eilean Donnáin, Loch Alsh
- Kildonan, Isle of Arran
- Kildonnan, Eigg (site of his monastery - excavated in 2012)
- Kildonan, Sutherland
- Kildonan Drive, Thornwood, Glasgow
- Kildonnan, Kilpheder Parish, South Uist
- Kildonnan, Little Loch Broom, Wester Ross
- Kildonnen, Lynedate, Loch Snizort, Skye
- Seipeil Dhonnáin, Kishorn
- St. Donnan's Chapel, Little Bernera, Lewis
- Saint-Donan, Brittany, France
- East Kildonan, Winnipeg, Manitoba, Canada
- West Kildonan, Winnipeg, Manitoba, Canada
- Kildonan, British Columbia, Canada

At least eleven Scottish churches are named for Saint Donnán.

== See also ==
- Celtic Christianity
- Columba
- Hiberno-Scottish mission
- Eigg
