= Badbea =

Coordinates: 58.159°N 3.551°W

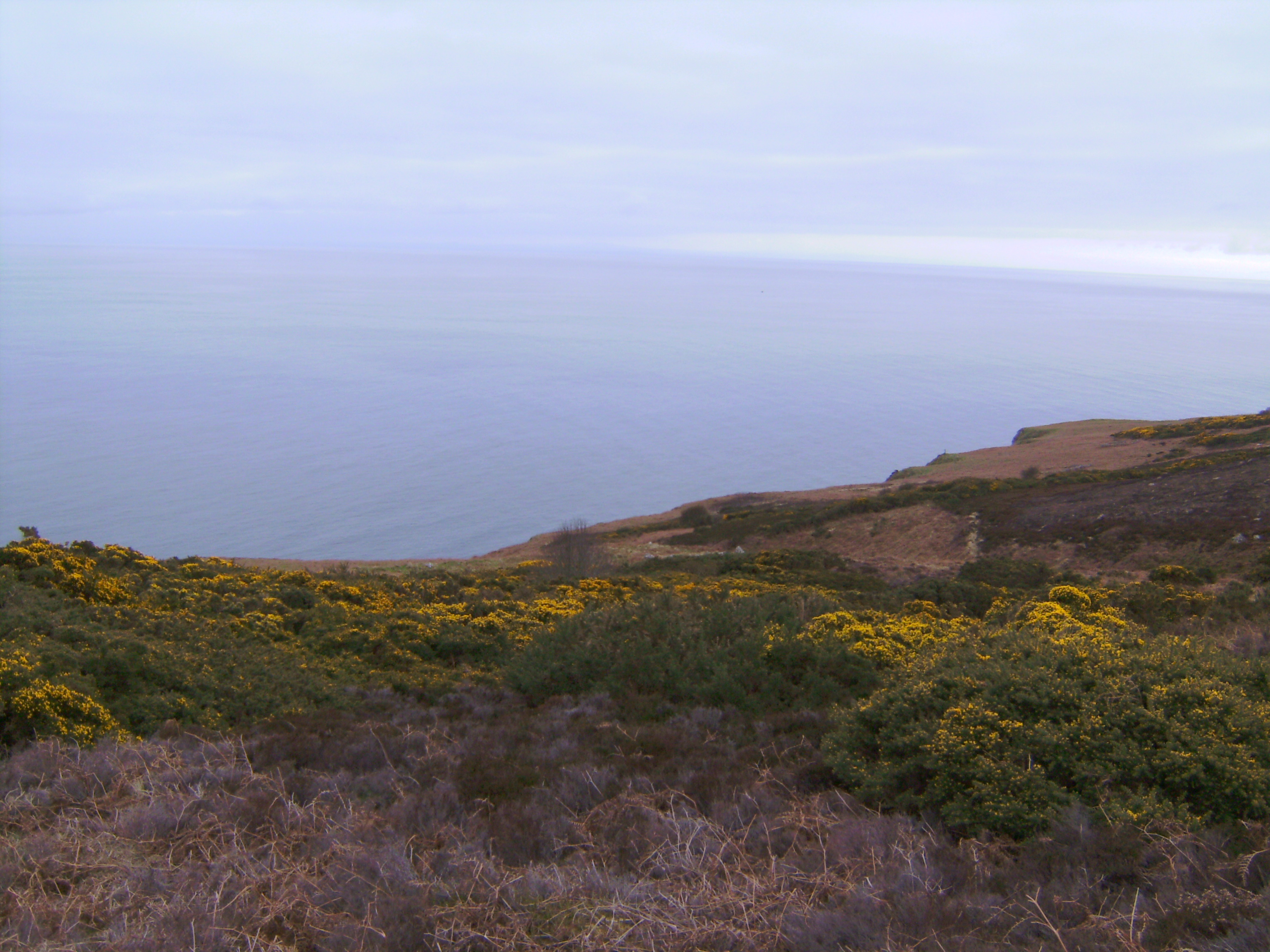
- A view of Badbea

- Location within the Caithness area
- OS grid reference: ND086196
- Council area: Highland
- Lieutenancy area: Caithness
- Country: Scotland
- Sovereign state: United Kingdom
- Police: Scotland
- Fire: Scottish
- Ambulance: Scottish

Badbea (pronounced bad-bay) is a former clearance village perched on the steep slopes above the cliff tops of Berriedale on the east coast of Caithness, Scotland. Situated around 5 miles (8 km) north of Helmsdale, the village was newly settled in the 18th and 19th centuries by families evicted from their homes when the straths of Langwell, Ousdale and Berriedale were cleared for the establishment of sheep farms. Some 28 evicted families resettled in the community.

The last resident left the village in 1911 and a monument was erected by the son of former inhabitant, Alexander Robert Sutherland, who had emigrated to New Zealand in 1839. Today, the ruins of the village are preserved as a tourist attraction and memorial to the Highland Clearances.

== Geography ==
Badbea is accessed by a footpath from a lay-by on the A9 road near Ousdale. The dwellings have all fallen into ruin, and little remains, other than a few drystone walls, although the outlines of the buildings and the remains of the crop fields are still visible. There is signage by the lay-by and around the village, which gives visitors an insight into the lives of the former inhabitants and the history of the site.

== History ==
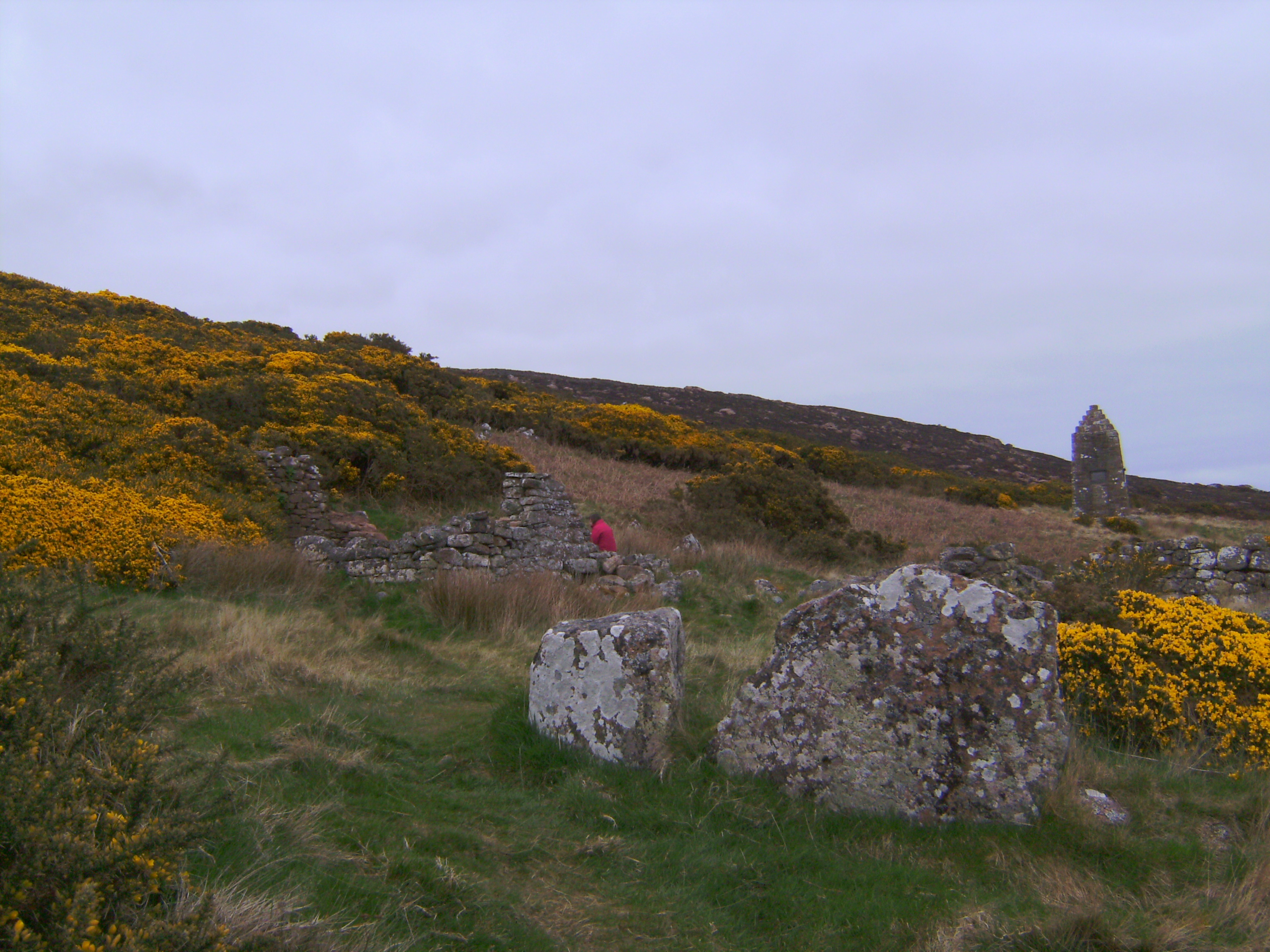
Ruins of the Badbea longhouses with the 1911 monument in the background

Toward the end of the 18th century tenant farmers were evicted from their homes across the Scottish Highlands to make way for sheep farming. From 1792 onwards, displaced families began to arrive in Badbea, a small area of rough, steeply sloping land, squeezed between the high drystone wall of the sheep enclosures and the precipitous cliffs of Berriedale above the North Sea. Many of the families were from nearby Ousdale, where landowner Sir John Sinclair of Ulbster had evicted them from their crofts in order to introduce sheep. Others came from the villages of Auchencraig, on the Langwell Estate and Kildonan. When the families arrived they were given small plots to farm, but had to clear the land, hack out the plots from the steep slopes, and build their own houses from the stones they found. In 1814 the estate was sold to James Home, by which time there were 80 inhabitants. During the late 19th century the main employment of herring fishing was discontinued by the then Laird, Donald Home, in favour of salmon fishing and the population declined as the families moved away to seek a better life. One of the inhabitants, Alexander Sutherland, had emigrated to New Zealand as early as 1838.

== Daily life ==
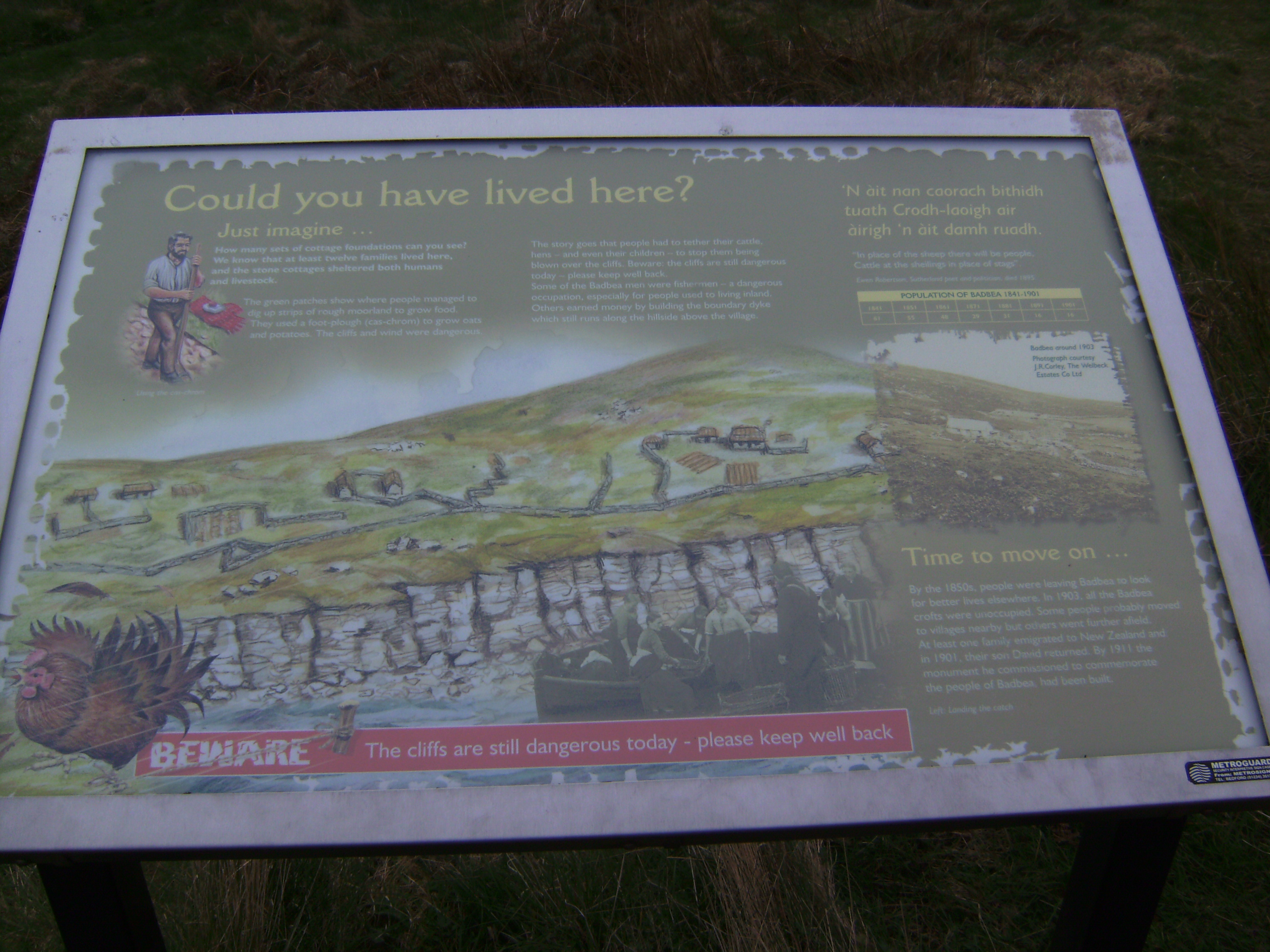
Badbea information signage

The plots of land, or crofts, had room for a longhouse with a byre at one end, outbuildings, and a kitchen garden or kailyard. The rest of the available land could only support some small vegetable plots and a few cows, pigs and chickens for each family; fresh water came from a nearby spring. There was only one horse in the village and no plough, so a chaib (a kind of spade) was used to plough the soil and the harrow was pulled by a man. Each house had its own spinning wheel, and all the women learned to spin and card. The men mainly worked as herring fishermen from nearby Berriedale and the women gutted the fish that were caught. While the women worked, their livestock, and even their children, were tethered to rocks or posts to prevent them from being blown over the cliffs or into the sea by the fierce winds. At the height of the herring industry there was plenty of food, even for the widowed families, but fishing was a dangerous occupation, especially for men who were used to working on the land.

== John Sutherland ==
The leader, preacher and doctor was John Sutherland (1789-1864), who was said to own the only watch in the village Sutherland was born at Ousdale to a tenant farmer before the clearances and had one brother, who died at Waterloo, and some sisters. His father died at an early age, Sutherland was left to raise his sisters on his own and, because of his family responsibilities, he never married. As the nearest church was some miles away, Sutherland, who was a pious man, opened his house to others on the Sabbath and preached to anyone who came. Sutherland, who was a gifted speaker, corresponded by letter with many members of the Church and became well known as the preacher "John Badbea", one of the most notable of the spiritual elite of the Caithness Church of Scotland who were known as "The Men" of Caithness. He was said to have performed many public duties for the church and made many friends across Caithness and Sutherland. In June 1855, at the age of 66, he wrote to an admirer in Glasgow who occasionally sent him monetary gifts, saying: "...I long to hear of my friend’s widow, Mrs G. Keith. Did she arrive safe in New Zealand with her dear little ones? This is a weary and dreary wilderness. 'The mirth of the land is gone'. Everything is out of order..." Sutherland died at the age of 75 and was buried at Berriedale at a funeral attended by several hundred mourners, many of whom had travelled long distances to pay their last respects.

== Monument ==
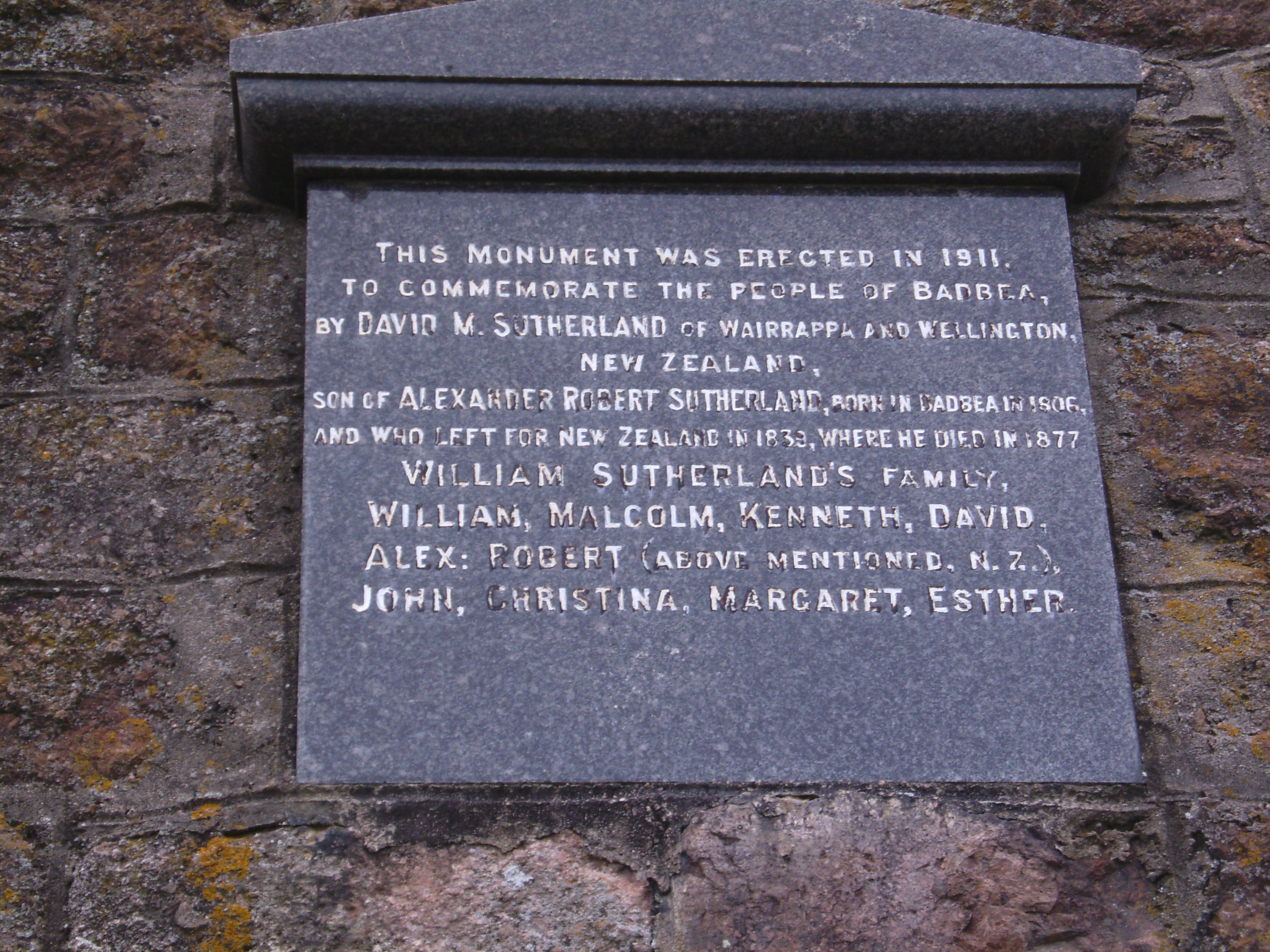
Inscription on the Badbea monument

The last inhabitant left the village in 1911 and in the following year, David Sutherland, the son of the New Zealand emigrant, Alexander Robert Sutherland, erected a monument, built from the stones of John Sutherland's home, in memory of his father and the people of Badbea.

== See also ==
Aultiphurst - former Highland clearance village.
