= Kildonan Castle =

Coordinates: 55°26′34″N 5°6′20″W

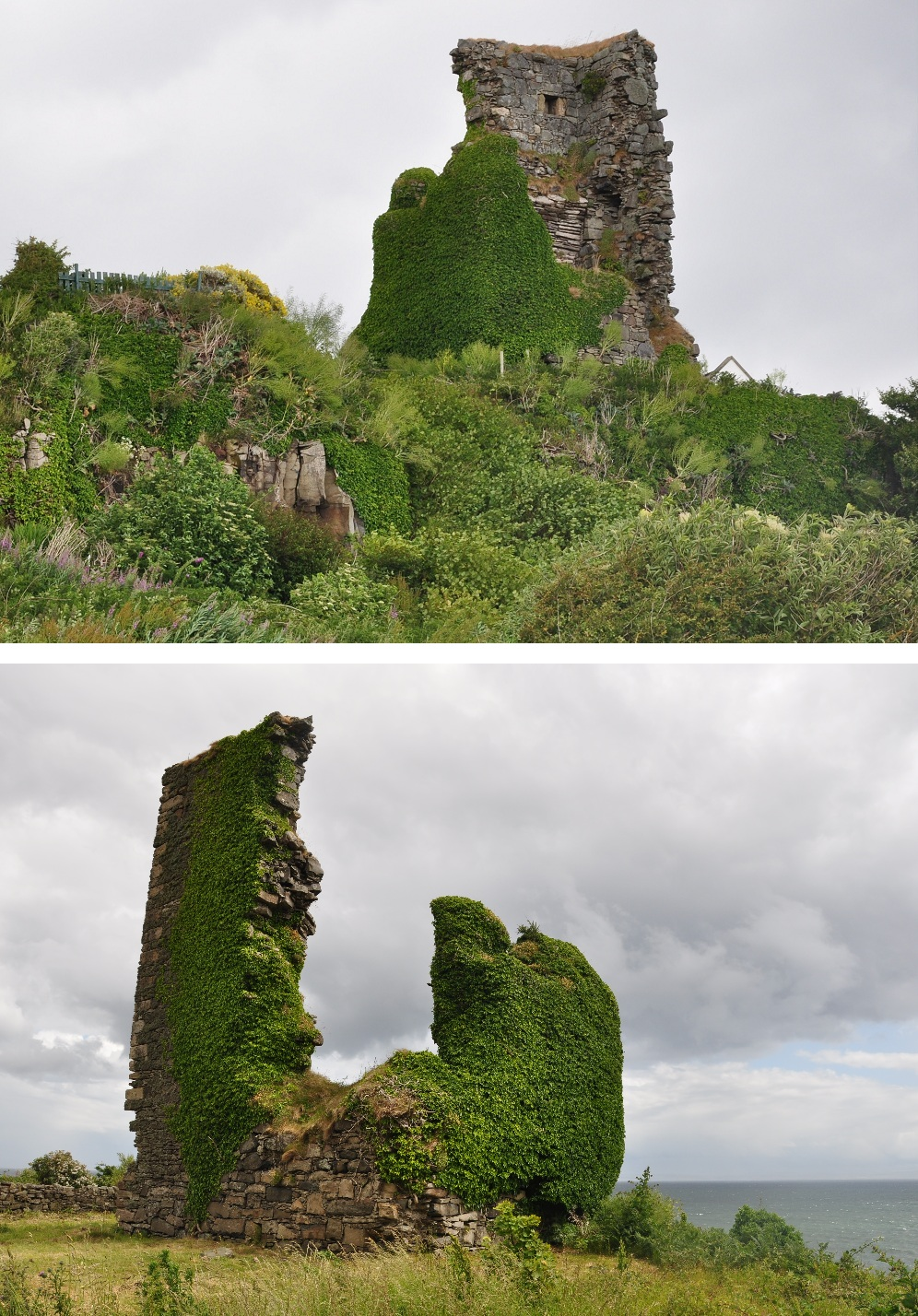
Kildonan Castle

Kildonan Castle stands in the small village of Kildonan on the southern coast of the Isle of Arran in Scotland. The castle's name is derived from the name of a former resident, Saint Donan, who is said to be buried on the island.

It was built in the 13th century by the MacDonalds, the Lords of the Isles. The castle stands on the cliffs, overlooking the island of Pladda and the entrance to the Firth of Clyde. It was built to defend against enemies attacking through the Firth.

It was used as a hunting lodge by the Kings of Scotland, including Robert III, when the island belonged to the crown. The castle became the property of the Earls of Arran in 1544.
