= Kildonan, British Columbia =

Unincorporated community in British Columbia, Canada

Coordinates: 49°00′00″N 125°00′00″W

Kildonan
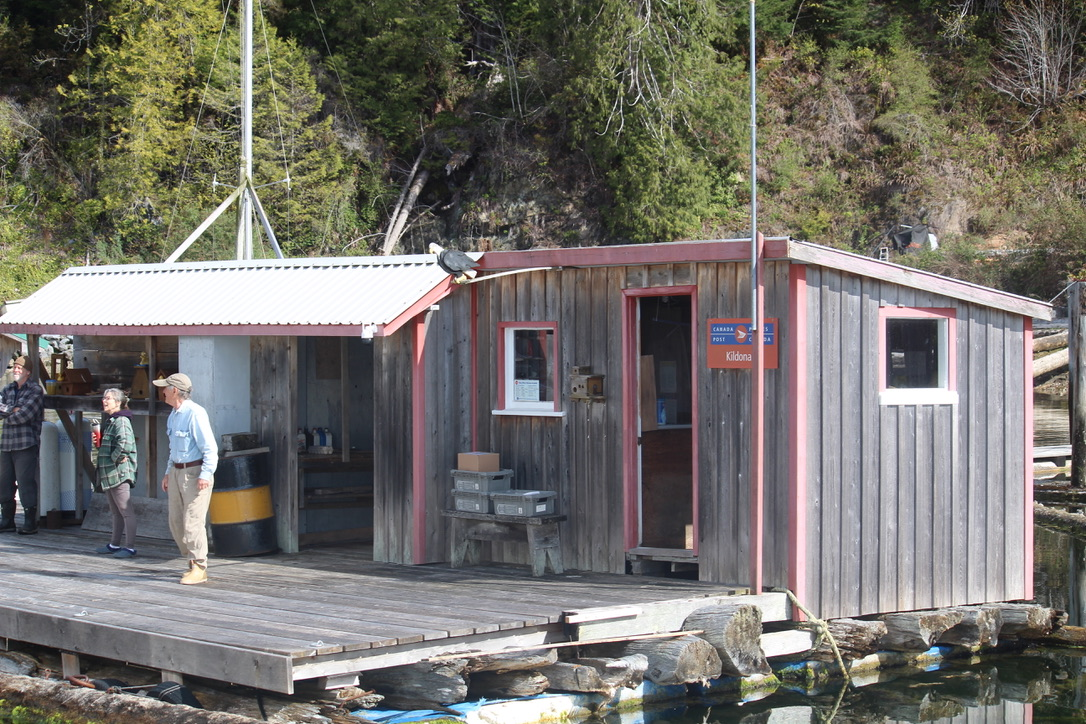
- Kildonan Post Office
- Interactive map of Kildonan
- Country: Canada
- Province: British Columbia
- Regional district: Alberni-Clayoquot
- Time zone: UTC-8 (PST)
  - Summer (DST): UTC-7 (PDT)

Kildonan is an unincorporated community in the Alberni Inlet-Barkley Sound region of the west coast of southern Vancouver Island, British Columbia. The former steamboat landing and ferry dock is on the east shore of Uchuchklesit Inlet, which branches northwest of the lower reaches of Alberni Inlet. Adjacent to Pacific Rim National Park Reserve, the locality is by road and ferry about 120 kilometres (75 mi) southwest of Port Alberni.

== Cannery ==
In 1903, captains Macdonald and Terman established the Alberni Packing Co. Creating the first cannery on the west coast of Vancouver Island, the company erected the Uchucklesaht Cannery on pilings. Purchased by Wallace Bros. Packing in 1906, or soon after, owners, Peter and John Wallace, renamed the cannery after their Scottish hometown of Kildonan. Reorganized as Wallace Fisheries in 1911, the company began a complete rebuild, and added a large cold storage in 1913. Such expansions increased the demand for seasonal workers, and the accommodation of bunkhouses for single men and cottages for families.

In 1919, when Wallace Fisheries approached W.H. Barker, manager of British Columbia Packers Limited (BC Packers) - to take over their Kildonan, Strathcona, Caxton, Quatsino and Naden Harbour canneries - his lack of interest in the latter two (because they were exclusively designed for pink and chum salmon) scuttled any deal.

In 1925, pilchards suddenly appeared in abundance along the coast, leading to a three-year fishing boom. That year, the cannery installed a Hiller Reduction Unit for manufacturing oil and fertilizer from this species. BC Packers completed a deal for all the Wallace canneries the next year, or soon after. In 1928, BC Packers and Gosse Packing merged, and Gosse's former San-Mateo Cannery closed. The latter machinery and equipment came to Kildonan, which augmented the existing dry-salting of chum salmon and herring for the Japanese and Chinese markets with salmon canning and freezing herring for halibut bait. The additional capacity proved sufficient for all their requirements. The reduction and dry-salting operations proved very profitable. However, that year, the pilchard migrated far out into the ocean, requiring larger fishing boats.

The Great Depression slashed production, leaving only a few major canneries like Kildonan and Nootka operating on the west coast. During the 1937–1941 drive to unionize the Vancouver Island canneries, the leading edge of the organization campaign was based at Kildonan. Albacore tuna was canned at the site after 1939. The next year, a new manager's house was built.

Liquefaction during the 1946 Vancouver Island earthquake extensively damaged the wharf and cannery buildings. That year, operations largely closed, when catches were sent to the company's Imperial Cannery at Steveston. The reduction plant continued during the herring season until 1960, and the ice plant for a further two years. The deteriorated buildings were torn down and burnt in 1962. Only the wharf and manager's house were spared. The remaining machinery was salvaged.

In 1965, the property was sold, but blackberry bushes soon overran the site. Nowadays, remnants of piles and concrete piers protrude from the shoreline.

== Community ==
D.M. Arbuthnot was the inaugural postmaster 1912–1912, A general store operated. Numbering around 100 in the late 1910s (possibly an overestimate), permanent residents reduced to 50 during the 1920s and 1930s. However, the seasonal cannery workers boosted the total population to about 300 during this whole period. The 1946 cannery closure shrank these numbers, reducing further on the 1960 reduction plant closure. By this time, the store had become a shadow of its former self, closing a few years later. By 1967, only two families remained as permanent residents at the cannery location. The former manager's house later became the Kildonan Lodge. Nowadays, the ferry drops off and collects mail three times weekly at the floating post office. The post office hours are limited to two days a week.

== Transportation ==
By the late 1910s, Kildonan was a port of call on the three times monthly Victoria–Port Alice Canadian Pacific Railway (CP) coastal steamboat run, which remained largely unchanged until the early 1950s. From the 1930s, the summer schedule was every 5 days. During the 1950s, the terminal moved south to Chamiss Bay. In July 1958, CP withdrew the west coast route.

From the 1910s, a three-times weekly launch also operated from Port Alberni. In 1946, the Barkley Sound Transportation Co. was formed. The three-times weekly run was Port Alberni–Franklin River–Kildonan–Bamfield–south shore of Barkley Sound–Port Alberni. In 1955, the company replaced the MV Unchuck I with the MV Unchuck II on the Kildonan–Sarita–Bamfield run. From 1959, the government subsidized this essential service.

Nowadays, Lady Rose Marine Services operates the three times weekly Port Alberni–Kildonan–Bamfield–Port Alberni run. The MV Frances Barkley and MV Lady Rose sail this passenger/mail/freight route, which also stops at intermediate float homes to make pickups and deliveries.

== See also ==
- List of canneries in British Columbia
