= Upper Bighouse =

Coordinates: 58.49326°N 3.9083°W

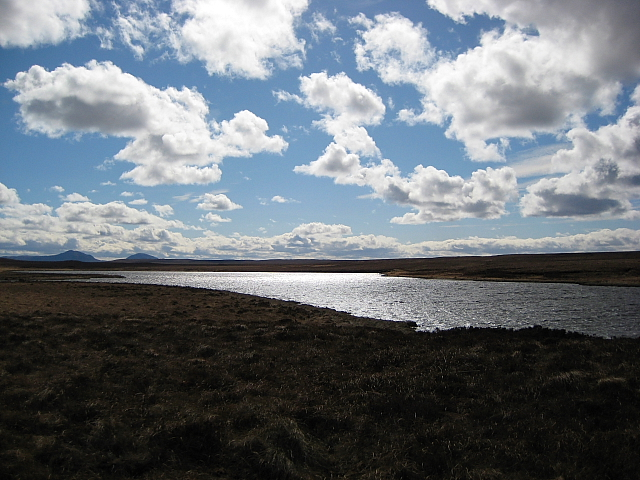
- Loch nan Gall Looking roughly south along the loch, Ben Griam Beg and Ben Griam Mor on the horizon.

- Location within the Sutherland area
- OS grid reference: NC888635
- Council area: Highland
- Country: Scotland
- Sovereign state: United Kingdom
- Post town: Thurso
- Postcode district: KW13 6
- Police: Scotland
- Fire: Scottish
- Ambulance: Scottish

Upper Bighouse is a remote linear crofting township, which lies on the west bank of the Halladale River in the former county of Sutherland. It is now in the Highland council area.

Upper Bighouse is located 4 miles south of Melvich.
