= Trantlemore =

Coordinates: 58.45155°N 3.90076°W

Trantlemore: Scottish Gaelic: Tranntail Mòr
- Location within the Sutherland area
- OS grid reference: NC891530
- Council area: Highland
- Lieutenancy area: Sutherland
- Country: Scotland
- Sovereign state: United Kingdom
- Post town: Forsinard
- Postcode district: KW13 6
- Police: Scotland
- Fire: Scottish
- Ambulance: Scottish

Trantlemore (Scottish Gaelic: Tranntail Mòr) is a small remote linear crofting township, lying on the left bank of the River Halladale, in Eastern Sutherland, Scottish Highlands and is in the Scottish council area of Highland.

The A897 road runs past Trantlemore.
