= Kildonan Lake =

Lake in British Columbia, Canada

- Location within Vancouver Island
- Location: Vancouver Island, British Columbia
- Coordinates: 49°02′00″N 124°58′00″W
- Lake type: Natural lake
- Basin countries: Canada

Kildonan Lake is a lake located on Vancouver Island as an expansion of Cass Creek, north east of Uchucklesit Inlet.

== See also ==
- List of lakes of British Columbia
