= Trantlebeg =

Coordinates: 58.45341°N 3.89323°W

Trantlebeg: Scottish Gaelic: Tranntail Beag
- Location within the Sutherland area
- OS grid reference: NC898532
- Council area: Highland
- Lieutenancy area: Sutherland
- Country: Scotland
- Sovereign state: United Kingdom
- Postcode district: KW13 6
- Police: Scotland
- Fire: Scottish
- Ambulance: Scottish

Trantlebeg (Scottish Gaelic: Tranntail Beag) is a small village east of the Halladale River in Forsinard, east Sutherland, Scottish Highlands and is in the Scottish council area of Highland.

The village of Croick lies less than 1 mile, directly north, along the A897 road.
