= Achina, Bhiwani =

Achina
- Village
- Map showing Achina in Haryana, India Achina (India)
- Coordinates: 28.63°N 76.39°E
- Country: India
- State: Haryana

Achina is a village in the Charkhi Dadri district of the Indian state of Haryana. Part of Hisar Division, it is located 32 kilometres (20 mi) south east of the district headquarters Bhiwani, 12 kilometres (7.5 mi) from Dadri-I and 271 kilometres (168 mi) from the state capital Chandigarh. Its Pin code is 127307 and postal head office is Achina. Nearby villages include Bass (2 km), Jhinjhar (4 km), Morwala (4 km), Bigowa (5 km) and Ranila (5 km).For political representational purposes the village is part of Dadri Assembly constituency and the Bhiwani-Mahendragarh Lok Sabha constituency.
