= Kildonan, Arran =

Coordinates: 55.441°N 5.111°W

Kildonan: Scottish Gaelic: Cill Donnain
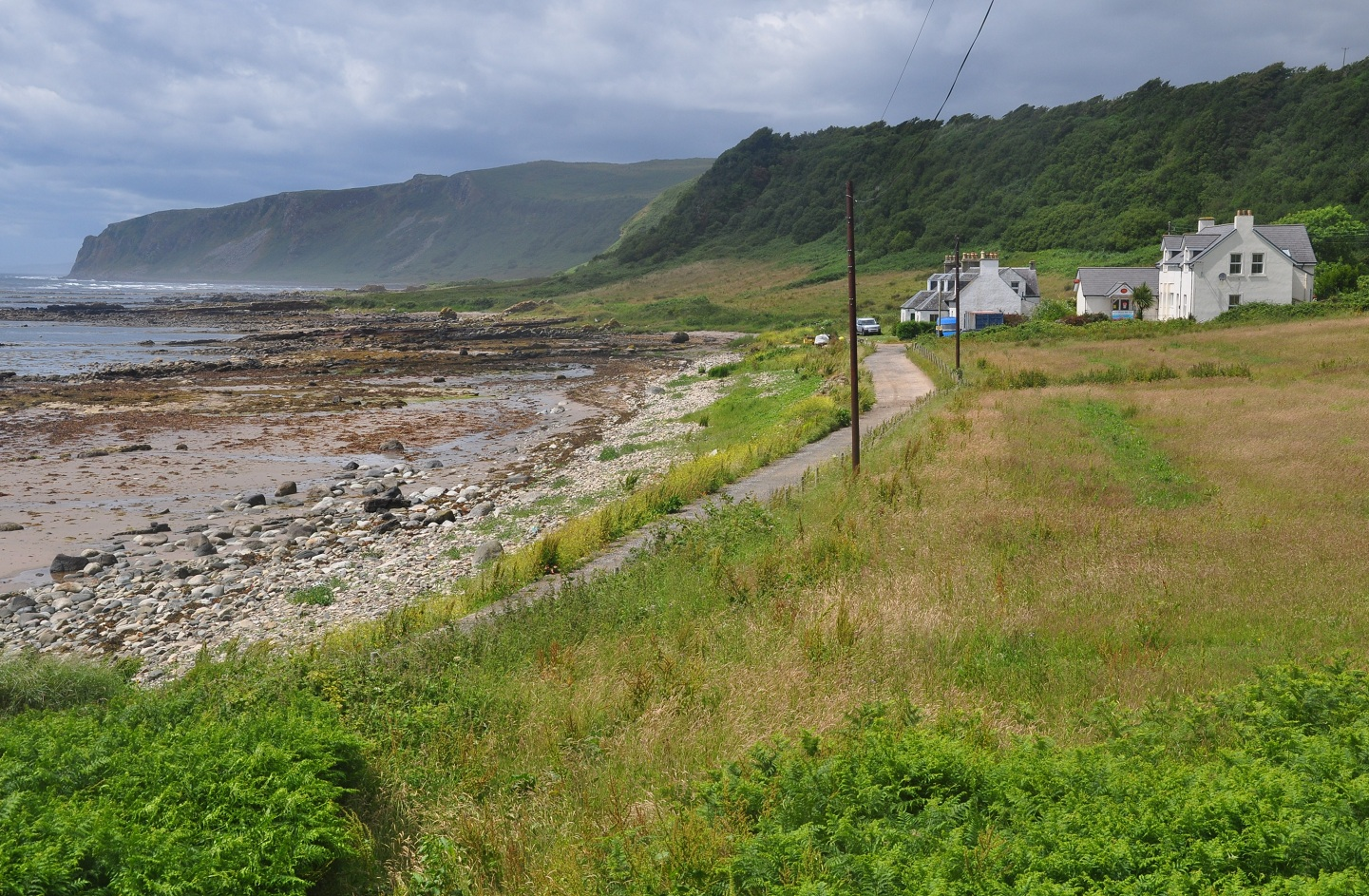
- The western end of Kildonan with the Post Office and Bennan Head

- Location within North Ayrshire
- OS grid reference: NS032207
- Civil parish: Kilmory
- Council area: North Ayrshire
- Lieutenancy area: Ayrshire and Arran
- Country: Scotland
- Sovereign state: United Kingdom
- Post town: ISLE OF ARRAN
- Postcode district: KA27
- Dialling code: 01770
- Police: Scotland
- Fire: Scottish
- Ambulance: Scottish
- UK Parliament: North Ayrshire and Arran
- Scottish Parliament: Cunninghame North

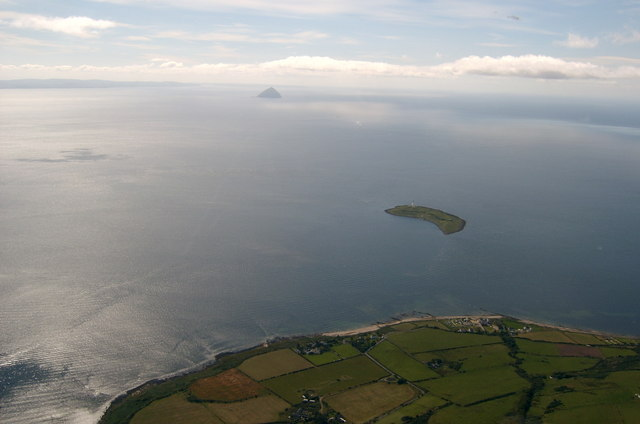
View over southern Arran with Kildonan and its beach clearly visible, Pladda and Ailsa Craig beyond in the Firth of Clyde

Kildonan (Scottish Gaelic: Cill Donnain) is a village on the south coast of the Isle of Arran in the Firth of Clyde, Scotland. The village is within the parish of Kilmory.

== History ==
The name Kildonan derives from Saint Donan who is reputedly buried in the village. Early life in the village revolved around Kildonan Castle (sometimes referred to as Kildonan Tower). Once a royal seat, the castle passed hands between various Scottish nobles, before latterly belonging to the Hamilton family in 1544, by which time they were the Earls of Arran. The Tower was later sacked and burnt by the Earl of Sussex around 1558. Ruined remains of the building are still in existence.

The first church built in Kildonan was The Free Church. It could accommodate 700 people. Eventually the United Free Church gained favour in the village around the turn of the 20th century, but services continued in the Free Church until it closed in 1940.

Drimla lodge is a listed 19th century house with Brazilian linked architecture.

== Geography ==
Kildonan is situated on the southern coast of the Isle of Arran. There is a large sandy beach the length of the village, which is unusual for the geology of Arran where rocky beaches are far more common.

== Community ==
The modern village originated from a few small buildings in the district, with the majority of local people engaged in farming. Overlooking the smaller islands of Pladda and Ailsa Craig in the far distance, Kildonan is a small but thriving community, with amenities in the village including the village hall, which opened in 1915.

=== School ===
There was a primary school in the village, but numbers on the roll declined so much it was shut in 1968. The School Houses are now available as holiday rental cottages. Schoolchildren from the village now attend the primary school in Whiting Bay, which is a few miles north, being ferried there and back each day by bus.

== Economy ==
There is now only one hotel in the village, the Kildonan Hotel. The Breadalbane Hotel was closed in 2009 and partly demolished. A village shop, coupled with a B&B, also closed. The Post Office, located in the shop, is still open. A smaller version of the shop opened in the Kildonan Hotel. The Southbank Farm park, towards Kilmory, is no longer open to the public, but there is now a woodturning studio based at the farm.

Kildonan was previously the site of the only coastguard station on Arran, but this was closed in 1981 when operations were transferred to Lamlash.
