= A897 road =

Road in Scotland

Coordinates: 58.3112°N 3.91328°W

A897

Major junctions
- South end: Helmsdale (ND155601)
- A9 A836
- North end: Melvich (NC898631)

Location
- Country: United Kingdom
- Constituent country: Scotland

Road network
- Roads in the United Kingdom; Motorways; A and B road zones

The A897 single track road is entirely within the Highland council area of Scotland. It runs generally north from the A9 at Helmsdale to the A836 near Halladale Bridge, east of Melvich. The road passes through or near Kildonan, Kinbrace and Forsinard, and has a junction with the B871 at Kinbrace. It also passes through Achiemore.

Helmsdale is on the east-facing North Sea coast of Britain. Melvich is about 40 miles (64 km) away, on the north-facing Atlantic coast. Apart from half a mile (1 km) or so within Helmsdale, the entire road is single track.

Between Helmsdale and Kinbrace the road is in Strath Ullie (known also as Strath of Kildonan). The River Ullie (known also as the River Helmsdale) reaches the sea at Helmsdale. Between Forsinard and Halladale Bridge the road is in Strath Halladale. The River Halladale reaches the sea near Melvich.

In 2016 the road was declared the quietest A road in Britain.
