= Achina, Highland =

Coordinates: 58.50°N 04.23°W

Achina
- Location within the Sutherland area
- OS grid reference: NC7060
- Council area: Highland
- Lieutenancy area: Sutherland
- Country: Scotland
- Sovereign state: United Kingdom
- Police: Scotland
- Fire: Scottish
- Ambulance: Scottish
- UK Parliament: Caithness, Sutherland and Easter Ross
- Scottish Parliament: Caithness, Sutherland and Ross

Achina is a village in Highland, Scotland.
