= Lednagullin =

Coordinates: 58.55128°N 4.05592°W

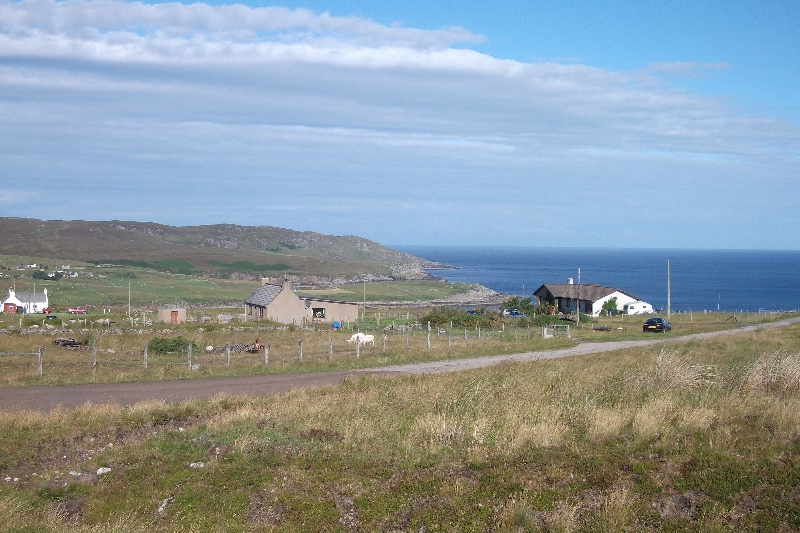
- Lednagullin, Sutherland, looking towards Armadale Bay

- Location within the Sutherland area
- OS grid reference: NC804644
- Council area: Highland
- Lieutenancy area: Sutherland
- Country: Scotland
- Sovereign state: United Kingdom
- Postcode district: KW14 7
- Police: Scotland
- Fire: Scottish
- Ambulance: Scottish

Lednagullin is a village on the south east shore of Armadale Bay in Sutherland, Scottish Highlands and is in the Scottish council area of Highland.
