= Melvich =

Coordinates: 58.55°N 3.92°W

Melvich: Scottish Gaelic: A' Mhealbhaich
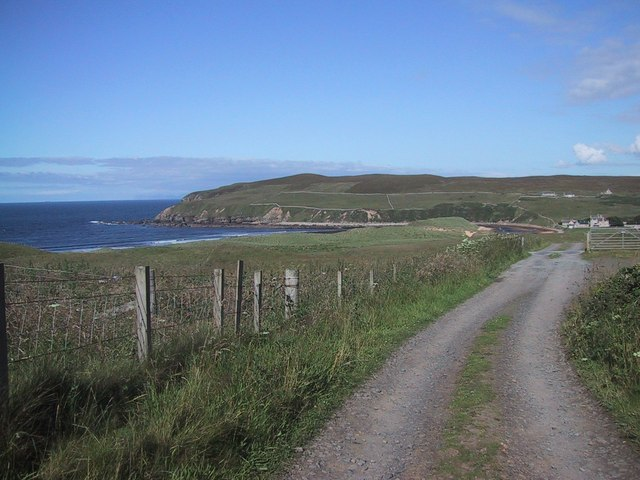
- Track to the beach at Melvich

- Location within the Sutherland area
- OS grid reference: NC8864
- Council area: Highland
- Lieutenancy area: Sutherland
- Country: Scotland
- Sovereign state: United Kingdom
- Post town: THURSO
- Postcode district: KW14
- Dialling code: 01641
- Police: Scotland
- Fire: Scottish
- Ambulance: Scottish
- UK Parliament: Caithness, Sutherland and Easter Ross
- Scottish Parliament: Caithness, Sutherland and Ross

Melvich (from Norse Mel Vik – "sand dune bay" – rendered into Scottish Gaelic: A' Mhealbhaich) is a village in the county of Sutherland on the north coast of Scotland. It is situated on the A836 road, near the mouth of the River Halladale. It has a successful Gaelic choir. The A897 road which runs from Helmsdale, through the Strath of Kildonan and past Kinbrace, terminates at Melvich.

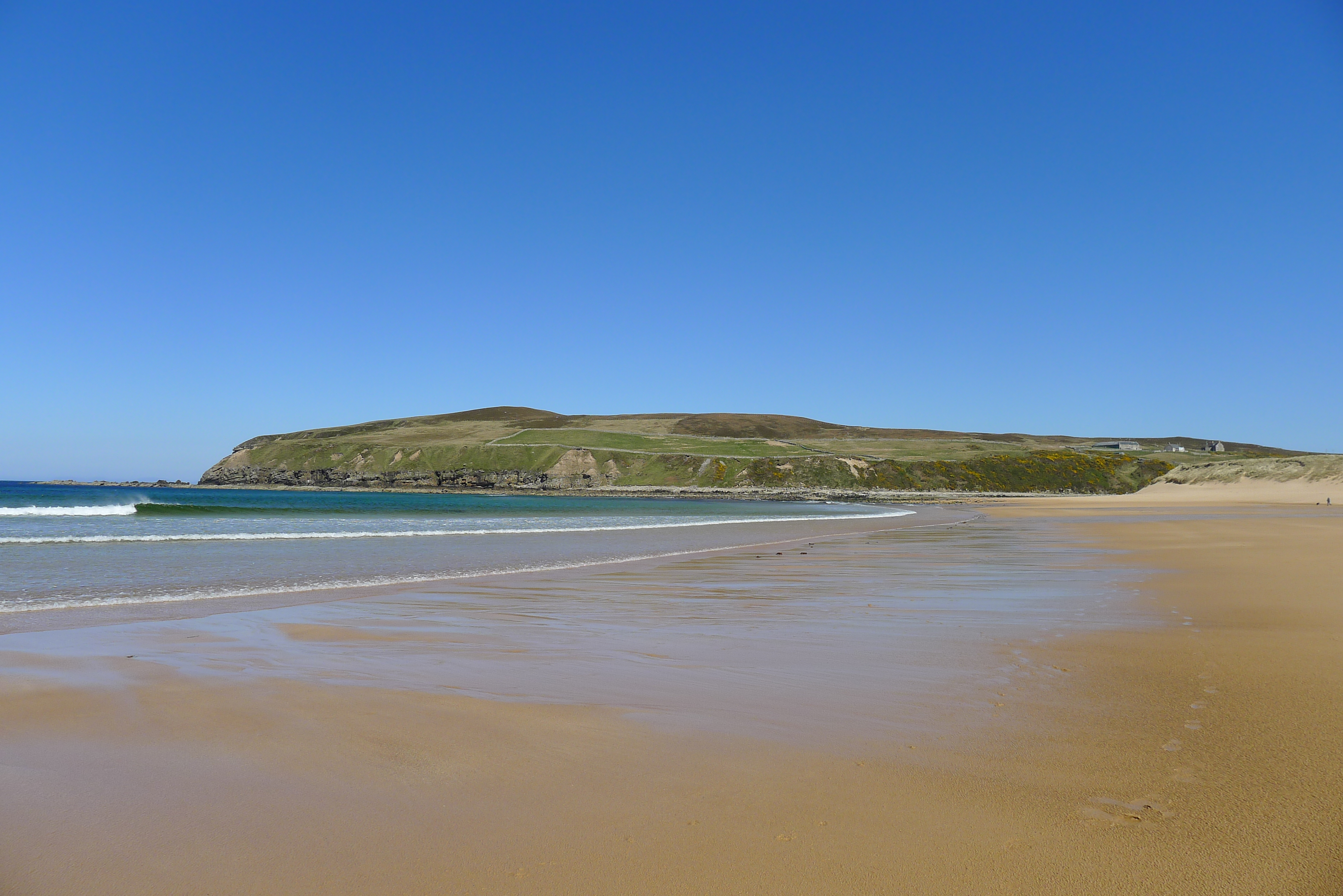
