= Kilphedir =

Coordinates: 58.14355°N 3.72293°W

Kilphedir: Scottish Gaelic: Cill Pheadair
- Location within the Sutherland area
- OS grid reference: NC986184
- Council area: Highland
- Lieutenancy area: Sutherland
- Country: Scotland
- Sovereign state: United Kingdom
- Post town: Helmsdale
- Postcode district: KW8 6
- Police: Scotland
- Fire: Scottish
- Ambulance: Scottish

Kilphedir (from Scottish Gaelic Cill Pheadair 'Peter's church') is a small remote settlement, which sits in the Strath Ullie valley (known also as Strath of Kildonan) in Helmsdale, Sutherland, east coast of the Scottish Highlands and is in the Scottish council area of Highland.

The River Helmsdale flows past Kilphedir following the A897 road.
