= Loch Rimsdale =

- Location within Sutherland
- Location: Scotland
- Coordinates: 58.2902°N 4.1536°W
- Primary inflows: Rimsdale Burn, Allt Lon A Chuil, Allt an Loin Tharsuinn
- Primary outflows: Loch Nan Clar, River Helmsdale
- Basin countries: United Kingdom
- Surface area: 3.3 km squared (1.3 square miles)
- Surface elevation: 121 metres (397 ft)
- Islands: Rubha Geal
- Settlements: Rimsdale, Gearnsary, Truderscaig, Bad an Leathaid

Loch Rimsdale is a loch in the Farr parish in Sutherland in the Highland Council Area of northern Scotland. It is located near the B871 main road. There are no settlements directly on the loch however the hamlet of Gearnsary and the Farmstead of Rimsdale are very nearby. The loch is used as both a reservoir and as one of few salmon fishery areas in Highland.

== Geography ==
The loch is over three miles across being long and thin but is also adjacent to Loch Nan Clar from which it is separated by a small channel. The only outflow of the Loch is Loch Nan Clar, which leads to the river Helmsdale but as for inflow there is many small streams that flow into Loch Rimsdale. Most importantly there is the appropriately named Rimsdale Burn which gets water all the way from Loch Sgeireach which is surprising as much of the outflow from that loch goes directly to Loch Nan Clar. Much of the other inflow into the Rimsdale burn however is from dozens of tiny brooks and streams most of which are unnamed which create a web of waterways around the mountains. Some of the water comes all the way from the peak of Beinn a' Mhadaidh while much of the other water flows from Alltan Peallach and its smaller unnamed tributaries some of which bring water from Loch Nan Faoileag. Adjacent to the Rimsdale burn, there is Allt Lon A Chuil which brings plenty of water from Green Loch and Loch Rosail. From there water flows further north to Palm Loch and to Creag nan Laogh. By Palm loch is the Mackay Country Landmark which is also where the inflow crosses back under the B871. Loch Nan Foileag also brings water into Allt Lon A Chuil as well as Loch Molach and on some occasions water from Rhifail Loch which usually flows into the River Naver and then the Atlantic Ocean, flows south into Loch Molach. Further North there is the tributary Allt Bothan Uisge-beatha which is named after Cnoc Bothan Uisge-beatha, the peak where its water comes from. A large area of small brooks and tributaries is beyond that and the outflow comes even further beyond. From Loch Feusaige which both gets its water from the peak with the same name as well as from Turn Loch Hill. Water also flows in from Ceann Garbh and through another tributary which is called Allt Rivigill however it also flows south towards the River Naver. Around this stream is the source of the River Helmsdale. Directly south of these two main rivers there is a couple unnamed brooks that flow directly into the Loch. The Allt Seabhag brings in water from the east near Sron an Eireannach in the Naver Forest on the west side there is Allt Achadh an Daraich which brings water from Cnoc Bad na Fainne. Further south is the location of the much more important Allt an Loin Tharsuinn which brings in water from Loch Truderscaig and Lochan Dubh. Allt na Beinne brings in water to Loch Truderscaig coming from Preas a' Chamraig and its tributary Allt Crom Allt which gets its water directly from three peaks, Creag Liath, Cnoc a' Chrom-uillt and Creag Dhubh. Coming from the southern end of the loch is the Gearnsary Burn named after the hamlet of Gearnsary, it also flows down to Cnoc A' Chrom-uillt. However its tributaries go much further. Allt Glas gets water from Creag an Alltan Fhearna and is the shortest named brook in the area. Allt na Creag Liath gets water from a peak with the same name and Allt a' Bhealaich gets water from Creag Liath as well but also from Creag an Lochain. The last stream Uidh Lochan na Gaineimh which gets water from a loch of the same name. Lochan na Gaineimh gets its water from Cnocan Liath-bhaid Mhoir.

As for hills and mountains, there is Ben Graim Mor the largest in the area, and there is Sron an Eareannach, Cnoc na h-Uidhe and Cnoc Uidh a' Chlarain to the north and south right by the loch. There is also the Naver Forest nature reserve directly east of Loch Rimsdale.

== Settlements ==
Many settlements are in the catchment area of Loch Rimsdale

=== Rimsdale ===
There is Rimsdale named after the Rimsdale burn which it sits on, it is a small farmstead consisting of two buildings just north of the B871. It is located on a track which separates it from the road, it is labelled as a small locality.

=== Gearnsary ===
Gearnsary or Cearnsary is the most well known of the settlements in the area, it is the only one listed by google maps and also the only one to be listed by the Ordnance Survey. It is located on a mostly private road to the Loch Choire Lodge. There is another very small trail directly in the farmstead. The Gearnsary burn is named after the farmstead although the much smaller Allt Glas is just as close to the farmstead.

=== Truderscaig ===
Truderscaig was once a large settlement located near the banks of Loch Truderscaig, one was named after the other however it is unclear which came first as they were both labelled in the 16th century. Truderscaig was a township between 1590 and 1900 although it was cleared in 1814. It consisted of many buildings many of which still have visible remains today. There is still a very small track that links the settlement and the adjacent loch to the rest of the world however most mapping sites do not list it, it is located just south of Bad an Leathaid.

=== Bad an Leathaid ===
Bad an Leathaid is the smallest, least known locality in the catchment area of Loch Rimsdale, it does not even have a road link. It is named after the mountain it is adjacent to. It is yet another deserted township in this area abandoned with very little archaeological evidence of its existence.

== Tourism ==
This loch as well as the neighbouring lochs of Loch Nan Clar and Loch Badanloch are all decent tourist destinations considering the area around them. Loch Nan Clar has two lodges in its vicinity, the Sheppard's Cottage and the Garvault. Fishing and hiking are all the reasons for tourism, much like almost all other lochs in the area, trout is by far the most common catch however, salmon can be found both here and in the River Helmsdale. Many hiking trains are in the area, many of which follow aforementioned paths and others run in very empty areas across the hills near the loch.

== History ==
Loch Rimsdale, Loch Nan Clar, and Loch Badanloch comprise the ‘three lochs’ reservoir system, created when the water level was raised by the building of the Badanloch Dam in the early 1900s. Prior to this, Loch Rimsdale was recorded on Ordnance Survey maps as Loch nan Cuinne.

There is a fan shaped stone row which consists of a couple dozen average sized stones arranged in four lines on the side of the loch, this is a sign of an abandoned or Lost Settlement.

=== Truderscaig ===
The aforementioned locality of Truderscaig is home to a large amount of archaeological sites, it has a large number of remains of circular huts and rectangular buildings that were all once a part of the thriving township. The smallest is 3x3 metres in size and the largest 28x4 metres.

=== Rimsdale ===
Rimsdale also has plenty of evidence of abandoned buildings, some roofed others unroofed although is a much smaller archaeological site than that of Truderscaig.

=== Bad an Leathaid ===
It is a scheduled monument and a deserted township that consists of three visible linked enclosures that comprise most of the buildings in the area, in total there are five buildings remaining.

== Mining ==
There are several small mineshafts around Loch Rimsdale.
