= Roderick Ross =

Scottish policeman (1865–1943)

Roderick Ross CVO CBE KPM
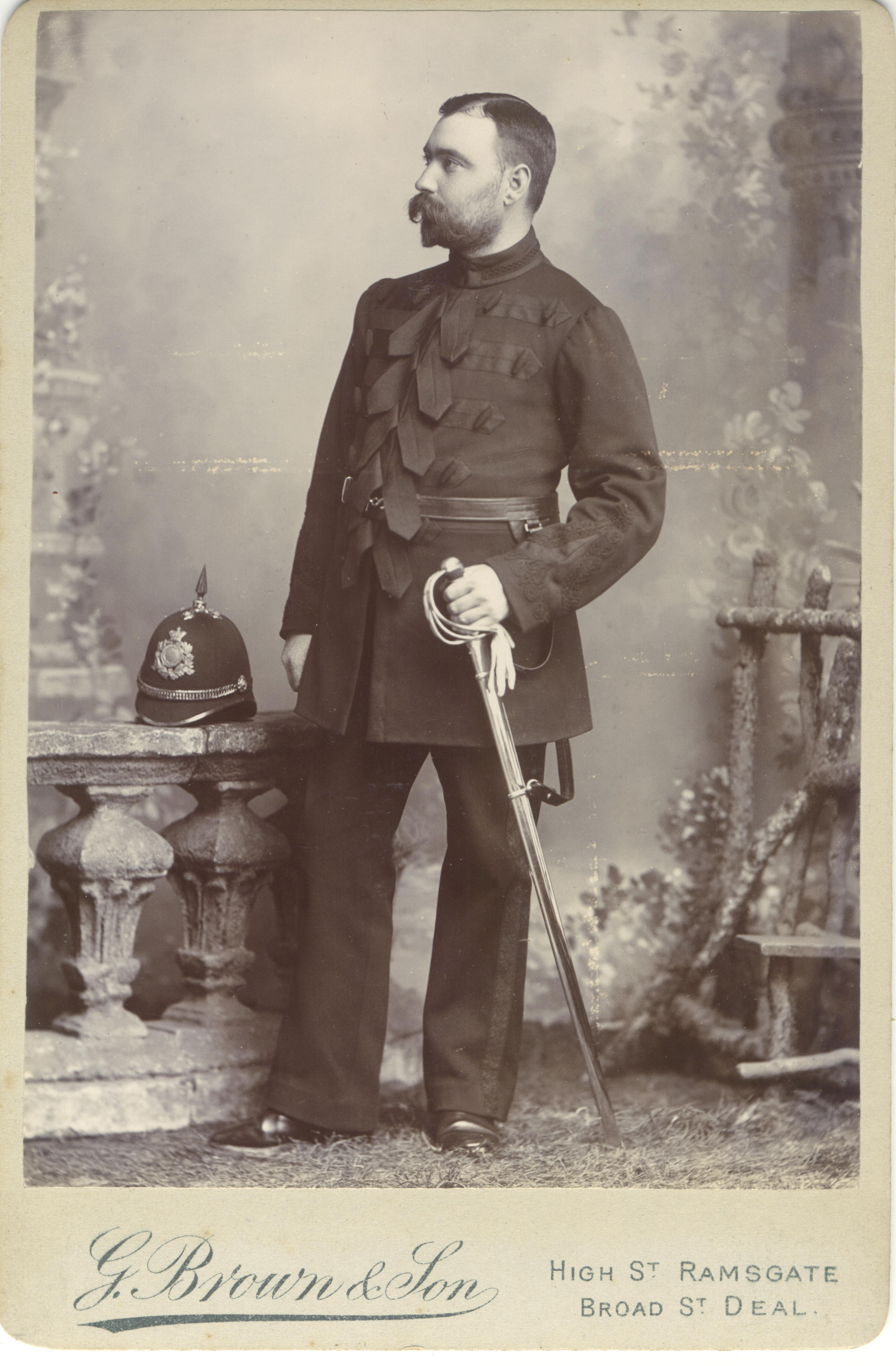
- Ross as Chief Constable of Ramsgate

Chief Constable of Edinburgh City Police
- In office 1900–1935

Chief Constable of Bradford City Police
- In office 1898–1900

Chief Constable of Ramsgate Borough Police
- In office 1894–1898

Personal details
- Born: 24 May 1865 West Helmsdale, Kildonan, Sutherland, Scotland
- Died: 6 March 1943 (aged 77) 19 Great King Street, Edinburgh, Scotland

Roderick Ross CVO CBE KPM (24 May 1865 – 6 March 1943) was Chief Constable of Edinburgh City Police from 1900 to 1935.

== Early life ==
Ross was born in West Helmsdale in the parish of Kildonan, Sutherland, the son of a crofter. His namesake, his grandfather, a Chelsea Pensioner, had been evicted from Kildonan during the Highland Clearances.

Aged 16, he was apprenticed to a Helmsdale tailor, but soon moved to Edinburgh where he was employed by Sir Andrew McDonald, an eminent clothier and later Lord Provost from 1894 to 1897.

== Police career ==
On coming of age at 21 he joined the police. Firstly, the Linlithgow Burgh Police, before moving after a year to Northampton and then Bacup, where he met Robert Peacock. Peacock took him to Kent when he assumed the position of Chief Constable of Canterbury City Police in 1888.

By 1891 Ross was a Sergeant and had married a local Canterbury girl. He left Canterbury in 1891 to go to Ramsgate Borough Police as Inspector. Three years later, when the Chief Constable's post became vacant, such was the ability he had shown and such was the high esteem he had earned, that the watch committee appointed him Chief Constable without advertising the post. He left Ramsgate in 1898 to take up the position of Chief Constable of Bradford, When at Bradford in charge of 354 men he commenced a programme of reform and started the police band. He left two years later to take up the post of Chief Constable of Edinburgh, a post he held from 1900 to 1935. He was succeeded in Bradford by Joseph Farndale.

When appointed the new Chief Constable of Edinburgh he sponsored the re-establishment of the Edinburgh City Police Pipe Band, now known as the Lothian and Borders Police Pipe Band. Prior to his appointment the band had struggled as an occasional ad hoc enterprise. The band wore for many years as its tartan the Ancient Red Ross in his honour, only giving it up shortly after his death and the end of World War II.

Ross introduced police boxes to Edinburgh in 1933. Edinburgh had at the time a population of over 427,000, and an area of over 52,000 acres (210 km^{2}); it was the largest urban police area in Scotland.

He was appointed Member 4th Class of the Royal Victorian Order (MVO) in September 1905, Commander of the Order of the British Empire (CBE) in the 1920 civilian war honours, and Commander of the Royal Victorian Order (CVO) in July 1934. He was awarded the King's Police Medal (KPM) in the 1922 New Year Honours.

== Personal life ==
In 1891 Ross married Elizabeth Mills, the daughter of a Canterbury fruit merchant and former licensed victualler. The couple had thirteen children, the first six born in England. Of the children, one was named after his mentor Sir Robert Peacock and another after his friend Sir Thomas Lipton. Ross bore a remarkable resemblance to King Edward VII.

Ross and two of his sons were Chief Constables at the same time. Donald Angus Ross (born 1896) was Chief Constable of Argyllshire from 1927 to 1961 and Douglas George Ross (born 1897) was Chief Constable of Sutherland from 1933 to 1962.

He retired to Portobello, Edinburgh and died on 6 March 1943 after a short illness in a nursing home at 19 Great King Street, Edinburgh. He is commemorated by a police golfing trophy, the Roderick Ross Challenge Cup, open to serving or retired Chief Officers.
