= Cill Pheadair =

Cill Pheadair, meaning 'Peter's church', may refer to:

- Kilpedder, County Wicklow, Ireland, a village
- Kilphedir, Sutherland, Scotland, a remote settlement
