= West Helmsdale =

Coordinates: 58.11671°N 3.67453°W

- Location within the Sutherland area
- OS grid reference: ND014154
- Council area: Highland
- Lieutenancy area: Sutherland
- Country: Scotland
- Sovereign state: United Kingdom
- Post town: Helmsdale
- Postcode district: KW8 6
- Police: Scotland
- Fire: Scottish
- Ambulance: Scottish

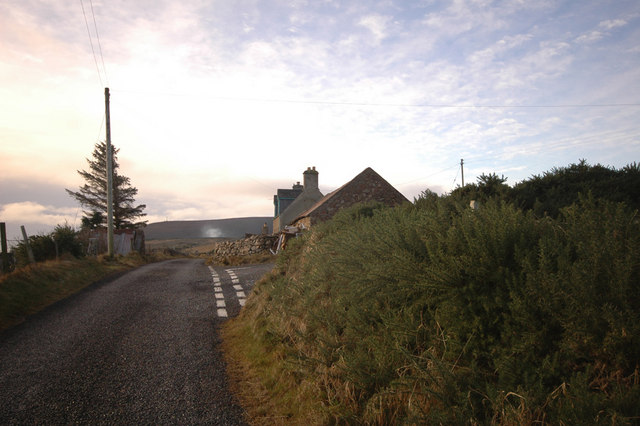
West Helmsdale in 2008

West Helmsdale is a small settlement lying on the right bank of the River Helmsdale, on the east coast of Sutherland, Scottish Highlands and is in the Scottish council area of Highland. The village of Helmsdale lies on the left bank of the River Helmsdale.

== Notable people ==
- Roderick Ross (1865–1943) CVO CBE KPM (1865–1943) was Chief Constable of Edinburgh City Police from 1900 to 1935. Born 24 May 1865 the son of a Crofter whose grandfather (his namesake) a Chelsea Pensioner had been evicted out of Kildonan during the Highland Clearances. Ross was born in West Helmsdale in the parish of Kildonan, Sutherland.
