= Farndale (surname) =

Farndale is a surname, and may refer to:

- Jamie Farndale (born 1994), Scottish rugby union player
- Joseph Farndale (1864–1954), British police officer
- Martin Farndale (1929–2000), British Army officer
- Nigel Farndale (born 1964), British author and journalist

== See also ==
- Farndale in Yorkshire, England
