= Loch Nan Clar =

- Location within Sutherland
- Location: Scotland
- Coordinates: 58.2918°N 4.1182°W
- Primary inflows: Loch Rimsdale, Allt na Cailbe Mor, Allt na Cailbe Beag
- Primary outflows: Loch Badanloch
- Basin countries: United Kingdom
- Surface area: 3.3 Km squared (1.3 square miles)
- Surface elevation: 121 metres (397 ft)
- Islands: Rubha Mor
- Settlements: Garvault, Gearnsary

Loch Nan Clar is a loch in Sutherland in the Highland Council Area of northern Scotland. It is located near the B871 main road, and there is no settlement directly on the lake although the hamlets of Gearnsary and Garvault are very nearby. The loch is used as both a reservoir and as one of few salmon fishery areas in Highland.

== Geography ==
The loch is 1.5 miles (2.4 km) across although it is directly adjacent to Loch Badanloch with the Rhuba Mor island being the only thing to really separate them. It's also adjacent to Loch Rimsdale and they're separated by a small channel. The only outflow of the Loch is Loch Badanloch but as for inflow there's many small streams in addition to Loch Rimsdale. There's Allt Caol, Feith Ghur and Allt Innse-Chomhraig all of which bring water from Ben Graim Mor, the largest mountain near to the lake. Allt na Cailbe Mor flows into the lake bringing water from Garbh Allt which brings water from Threestone Hill and Beinne a' Mhadiadh as well as from the array of streams around Allt a' Chreimh which even reaches Lochan Sgeireach far north. There's also Allt na Cailbe Beag. As for hills and mountains, there's Ben Graim Mor the largest in the area, and there's Sron an Eareannach, Cnoc na h-Uidhe and Cnoc Uidh a' Chlarain to the north and south right by the loch. There's also the Naver Forest nature reserve directly north of Loch Nan Clar.

== Access ==
The B871 as well as a small collection of rural tracks run through the south of the Loch. One runs down to Loch Choire through Gearnsary. Smaller paths link the main one to the banks of Lochan an Alltan Fhearna The other runs further south to Loch na Gaineime. In addition there's a pathway running south from the B871 further west that is the only direct access to the loch. There is also relatively nearby rail access considering the isolated location of Loch Badanloch in the form of Kinbrace railway station however not only is it 7 miles away but it's also only served by 8 trains per day.

== Tourism ==
This loch as well as the neighbouring lochs of Loch Rimsdale and Loch Badanloch are all decent tourist destinations considering the area around them. Loch Nan Clar has two lodges in its vicinity, the Sheppard's Cottage and the Garvault. Fishing and hiking are all the reasons for tourism, much like almost all other lochs in the area, trout is by far the most common catch however, salmon can be found both here and in the River Helmsdale. Many hiking trains are in the area, many of which follow aforementioned paths and others run in very empty areas across the hills near the loch.

== Archaeology ==
Flint implements were found on a "neck of sand" in one area of the loch's shore which has since been reclaimed by the water, it was located between the current shore of the loch and Rubha Mor meaning they were onces linked.

== Mining ==
There are several small mineshafts around Loch Nan Clar.
