= Douglas Ross =

Douglas or Doug Ross may refer to:

- Douglas Ross (Canadian politician) (1883–1961), Canadian politician
- Douglas George Ross (1897–1980), Chief Constable of Sutherland
- Douglas T. Ross (1929–2007), American computer scientist
- Douglas Ross (physicist) (born 1948), British physicist
- Douglas A. Ross (born 1948), Canadian political scientist
- Doug Ross (ice hockey) (1951–2022), American Olympic ice hockey player and coach
- Douglas Ross (Scottish politician) (born 1983), former leader of the Scottish Conservatives, current member of the Scottish parliament and former member of the UK parliament
- Doug Ross, fictional character from the television series ER
