= Joseph Farndale =

Joseph Farndale CBE KPM

Chief Constable of Bradford City Police
- In office 1900–1938

Chief Constable of York City Police
- In office 1897–1900

Personal details
- Born: 1864 Wakefield, West Riding of Yorkshire, England
- Died: 22 February 1954 (aged 89–90)

Joseph Farndale CBE KPM (1864 – 22 February 1954) was a British police officer who served as Chief Constable of Bradford City Police from 1900 to 1938.

Farndale was born in Wakefield and educated at Field House Academy in Aberford. He joined the police at the age of twenty and later became Chief Constable of Margate Borough Police. Leaving Margate he took on the role of chief constable of York City Police in 1897 before moving to Bradford in 1900 to succeed Roderick Ross, who had left for Edinburgh.

He was awarded the King's Police Medal (KPM) in 1914 and appointed Officer of the Order of the British Empire (OBE) in the 1920 civilian war honours and Commander of the Order of the British Empire (CBE) in the 1924 Birthday Honours.
