= Kildonan Gold Rush =

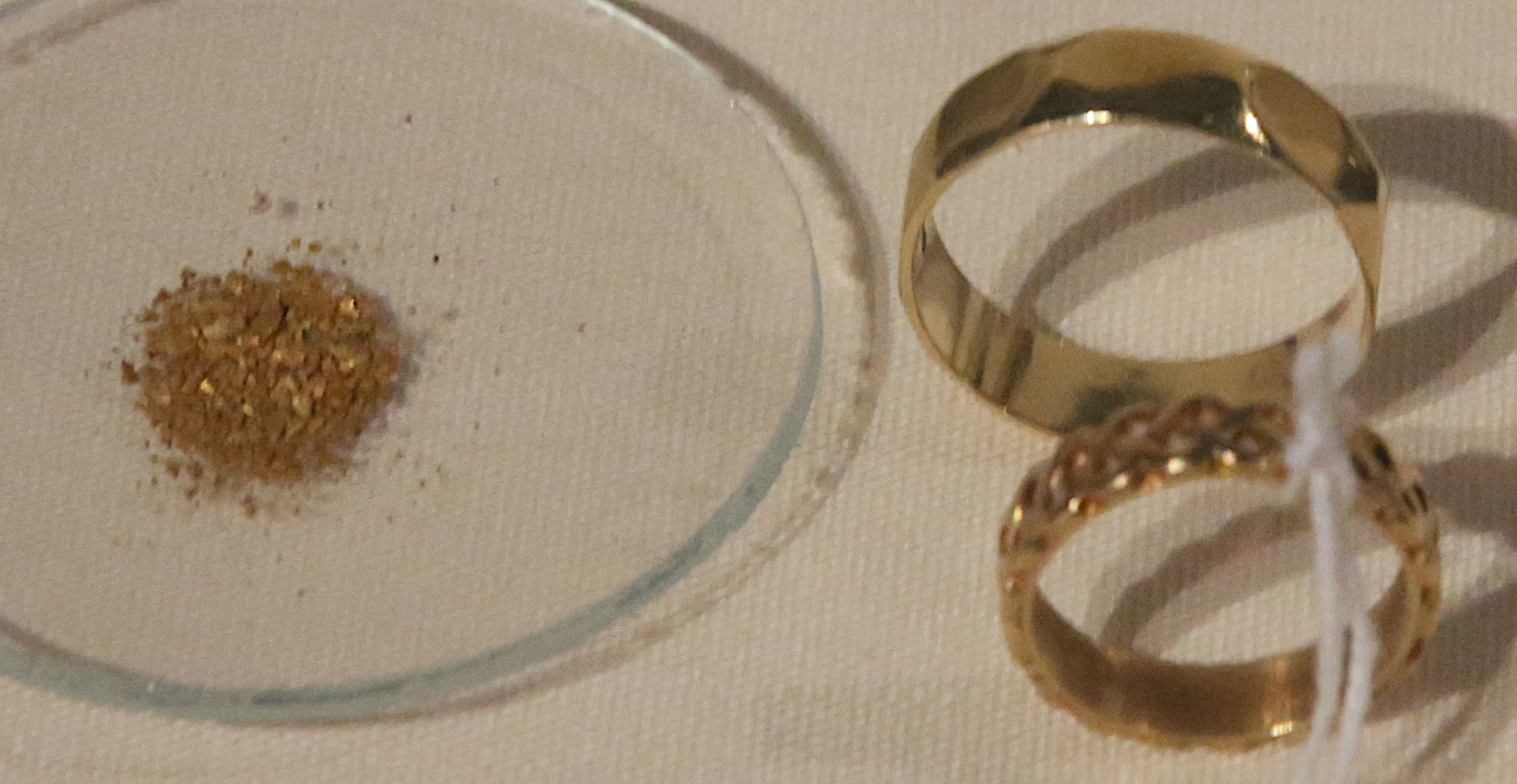
Examples of Kildonan gold in Inverness Museum and Art Gallery

The Kildonan Gold Rush was a gold rush in the Strath of Kildonan, Sutherland, in the Highlands of Scotland in 1869.

Small amounts of gold had long been discovered in the Kildonan area. A nugget with enough material for a ring was discovered in 1818 near the Suisgill and Kildonan burns.

Public interest was sparked, and a gold rush started, following a newspaper announcement late in 1868 of the results of Robert Nelson Gilchrist's more systematic search for gold. A local newspaper stated that gold had been discovered at Kildonan. Gilchrist, a native of Kildonan, had spent 17 years in the goldfields of Australia. On his return home, the Duke of Sutherland gave him permission to pan the gravels of the Helmsdale River, and he prospected all the burns and tributaries. The gold rush proper began in January 1869. At this stage those searching for gold stayed in Helmsdale or more ad hoc accommodation near the Kildonan burn including the old Kildonan Church.

Two small towns, Baile an Or (Scottish Gaelic: Baile an Òir "town of gold") and Carn na Buth (Scottish Gaelic: Càrn nam Bùth "hill of huts"), were built to accommodate the prospectors. However, the gold rush ended by 1870, as the Duke of Sutherland ended it due to a conflict of interest with deer stalkers.
