= List of listed buildings in Kildonan, Highland =

This is a list of listed buildings in the parish of Kildonan in Highland, Scotland.

== List ==
Name	Location	Date Listed	Grid Ref. (Note: Sometimes known as OSGB36, the grid reference (where provided) is based on the British national grid reference system used by the Ordnance Survey. • "Guide to National Grid". Ordnance Survey. • "Get-a-map". Ordnance Survey.)	Geo-coordinates	Notes	LB Number (Note: Historic Environment Scotland assign a unique alphanumeric identifier to each designated site in Scotland, for listed buildings this always begins with "LB", for example "LB12345".)	Image
Navidale House, Garden Walls And Gatepiers				58°07′27″N 3°37′45″W	Category B	12370	Upload Photo
Sutherland House, Sutherland Street	Helmsdale			58°07′04″N 3°39′11″W	Category C(S)	7186	Upload another image
3 Gartymore				58°06′42″N 3°40′35″W	Category B	7202	Upload Photo
Anvil House, Strathnaver Street	Helmsdale			58°07′06″N 3°39′12″W	Category C(S)	7203	Upload another image
Alltanduin, Winnowing Barn				58°12′23″N 4°01′41″W	Category C(S)	45595	Upload Photo
The Customs House And Ancillary Buildings, Including Rear Courtyard Walls, Shore Street	Helmsdale			58°06′55″N 3°38′57″W	Category B	12914	Upload Photo
Helmsdale Railway Station, Footbridge And Signal Box On Platform	Helmsdale			58°07′03″N 3°39′31″W	Category B	7184	Upload another image
Feranich, Sutherland Street	Helmsdale			58°07′03″N 3°39′10″W	Category C(S)	7185	Upload Photo
Kildonan Farm (Former Kildonan Parish Manse)				58°09′49″N 3°51′12″W	Category C(S)	7189	Upload Photo
Kilphedir Bridge Over Allt Cille Pheadair (Burn)				58°08′42″N 3°43′05″W	Category C(S)	7191	Upload Photo
69 and 70, Dunrobin Street	Helmsdale			58°06′56″N 3°38′56″W	Category B	7198	Upload Photo
73, Dunrobin Street	Helmsdale			58°06′56″N 3°38′52″W	Category C(S)	7200	Upload Photo
Helmsdale Harbour, Shore Street, Old House To Rear 11 Shore Street				58°06′55″N 3°39′02″W	Category C(S)	7194	Upload Photo
Ruard And Rear Service Cottage (Former Church Of Scotland Manse), Stafford Street	Helmsdale			58°07′02″N 3°38′56″W	Category B	7199	Upload Photo
The Free Church Manse, Wall And Gate Piers, Stittenham Street	Helmsdale			58°07′08″N 3°39′16″W	Category B	7201	Upload Photo
Helmsdale War Memorial	Helmsdale			58°07′00″N 3°39′23″W	Category C(S)	7196	Upload another image See more images
Logielea, Strathnaver Street	Helmsdale			58°07′06″N 3°39′10″W	Category C(S)	7204	Upload Photo
Kildonan Old Parish Church And Burial Ground				58°09′43″N 3°51′16″W	Category B	7188	Upload Photo
Kildonan Bridge Over River Helmsdale	Kildonan			58°10′14″N 3°52′05″W	Category C(S)	7190	Upload another image
Blar-Mhor (By Achentoul)	Kinbrace			58°16′43″N 3°55′18″W	Category B	7192	Upload another image
Masonic Lodge, Sutherland Street	Helmsdale			58°07′04″N 3°39′12″W	Category C(S)	7187	Upload another image
Old Bridge, Over River Helmsdale	Helmsdale			58°07′00″N 3°39′18″W	Category A	7193	Upload another image See more images
The Bridge Hotel, Bridge Street	Helmsdale			58°07′02″N 3°39′14″W	Category B	7197	Upload another image See more images
Helmsdale Ice House	Helmsdale			58°07′00″N 3°39′21″W	Category B	7195	Upload another image See more images

== Key ==
The scheme for classifying buildings in Scotland is:

- Category A: "buildings of national or international importance, either architectural or historic; or fine, little-altered examples of some particular period, style or building type."
- Category B: "buildings of regional or more than local importance; or major examples of some particular period, style or building type, which may have been altered."
- Category C: "buildings of local importance; lesser examples of any period, style, or building type, as originally constructed or moderately altered; and simple traditional buildings which group well with other listed buildings."

In March 2016 there were 47,288 listed buildings in Scotland. Of these, 8% were Category A, and 50% were Category B, with the remaining 42% being Category C.

== See also ==
- List of listed buildings in Highland
