= Kildonan, Sutherland =

Coordinates: 58.1754°N 3.8639°W

Kildonan
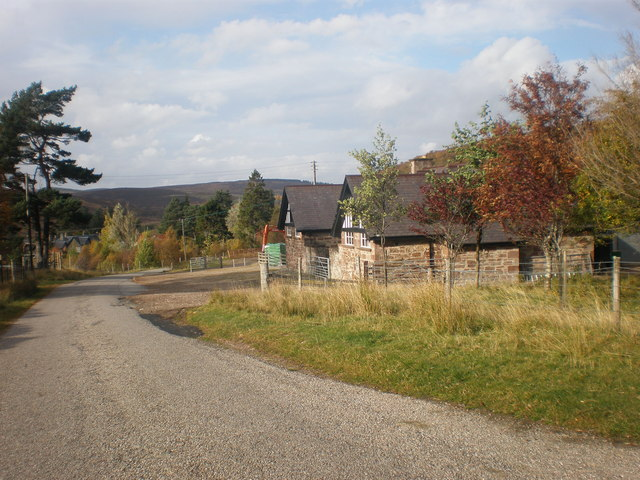

- Location within the Highland council area
- Population: 725 (2011)
- OS grid reference: ND025155
- Civil parish: Kildonan
- Council area: Highland
- Lieutenancy area: Sutherland
- Country: Scotland
- Sovereign state: United Kingdom
- Post town: HELMSDALE
- Police: Scotland
- Fire: Scottish
- Ambulance: Scottish
- UK Parliament: Caithness, Sutherland and Easter Ross
- Scottish Parliament: Caithness, Sutherland and Ross

Kildonan is a parish in Sutherland, in the council area of Highland, Scotland. It is located in the east next to the boundary with Caithness. It has a coast line of about 5 miles, but extends about 25 miles inland. Its main settlement is Helmsdale.

The name means church or chapel of St. Donan in Gaelic.

At the 2011 census, the population of the civil parish was 725 (usually resident population), of which more than 90% were in Helmsdale. Only 4.4% had some knowledge of Gaelic, whereas in 1891 49% were Gaelic speaking.

The area of the parish is 134,532 acres.

The community council area, called Helmsdale, covers Kildonan and a large part of the parish of Loth.

== See also ==
- List of listed buildings in Kildonan, Highland
