= Loch Choire =

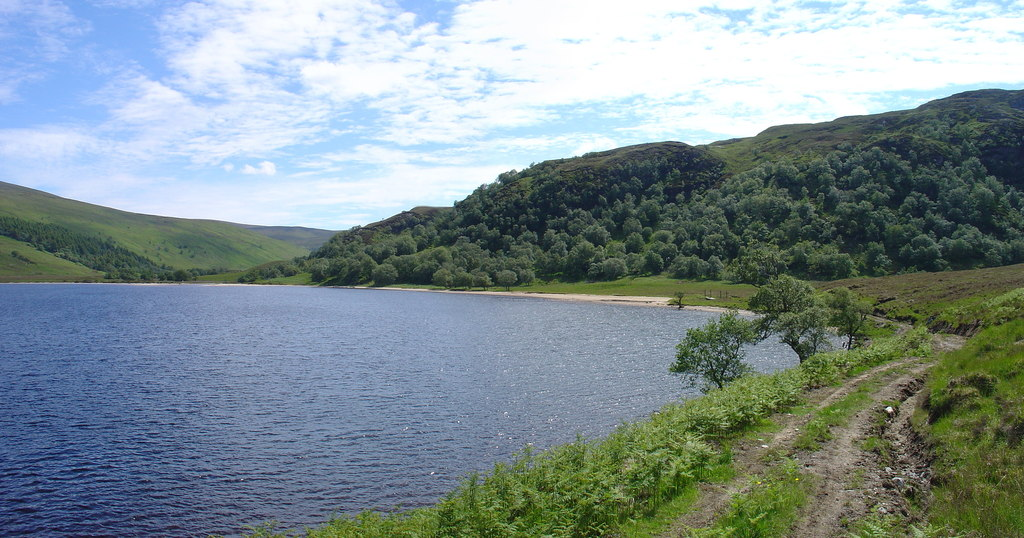

- Location within Sutherland
- Location: Scotland
- Coordinates: 58.2235°N 4.3313°W
- Type: Loch
- Primary inflows: Allt Coire Na Fearna, Loch a' Bhealaich
- Primary outflows: Mallart River
- Basin countries: United Kingdom
- Max. length: 5 kilometres (3.1 mi)
- Surface elevation: 173 metres (568 ft)
- Islands: 1
- Settlements: Loch Choire Lodge, Coire Na Fearna, Alltnaba, Alltalaird

Loch Choire is a loch in Sutherland in the Highland council area of northern Scotland. It is located at the end of a rural street which links the loch and the lodges around it with Badanloch Lodge and the B871 main road.

== History ==
Many old maps of Sutherland show evidence of the existence of Loch Choire from various sources from as far back as the 19th century. This includes maps from 1830, 1882 and 1884. However many older maps didn't show obvious evidence of Loch Choire and those that did didn't give much detail due to the area not having been surveyed much at that time. An example of this can be shown from maps from around 1820. Additionally Ordnance Survey has had the Loch marked and visited since 1961.

== Geography ==
The Primary inflows of Loch Choire are Allt Coire Na Fearna and Loch a' Bhealaich all of which bring in water from the nearby mountains. To the north of Loch Choire is Ben Klibreck, one of the tallest mountains in Sutherland and flowing out of Loch Choire is the Mallart River. Loch Choire has one island located at the eastern end of the loch and the loch is 5 kilometres long and around 700–1000 metres wide. The loch is elevated 173 metres above sea level and has four settlements on it: Loch Choire Lodge, Coire Na Fearna, Alltnaba and Alltalaird.

Allt Coire Na Fearna flows into Loch Choire from the south bringing in water from peaks such as Creag Riabhach na Gheighe, Meall an Fhuarain, Meall na Caillich and Meall a' Bhata. Much of the water flows from these mountains itno Allt Coire Na Fearna through its tributaries: Allt na Caillich and Allt a' Chraisg.

Loch a' Bhealaich is connected to Loch Choire by a very small, unnamed channel which flows downstream a few metres connecting the two lochs. Therefore, Loch a' Bhealaich is elevated slightly higher than Loch Choire.
