= Loch Badanloch =

Lake in northern Scotland

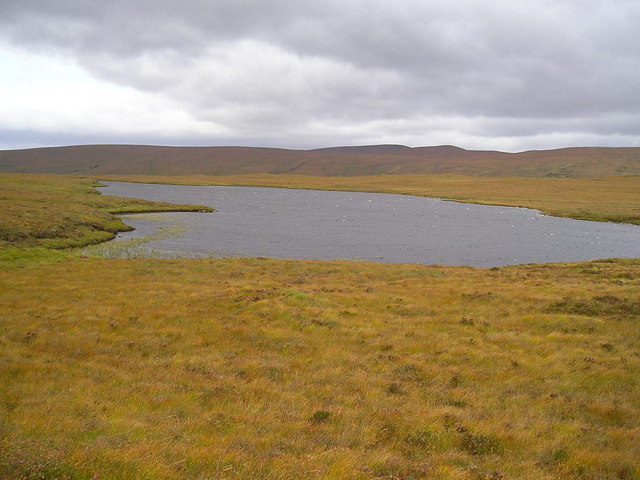

- Location within Sutherland
- Location: Scotland
- Coordinates: 58.2778°N 4.0875°W
- Primary inflows: Loch Nan Clar, Uidh a' chlarain
- Primary outflows: River Helmsdale
- Basin countries: United Kingdom
- Surface elevation: 121 metres (397 ft)
- Islands: Rubha Mor
- Settlements: Badanloch Lodge, Gearnsary

Loch Badanloch is a loch in Sutherland in the Highland Council Area of northern Scotland.

The settlement on the lake is Bandanloch Lodge. The hamlet of Gearnsary is nearby. The loch is used as both a reservoir and as a Highland salmon fishery.

== Geography ==
The loch is 1.5 miles (2.4 km) across and is directly adjacent to the Loch Nan Clar with Rubha Mor island separating them. The Settlement of Bandanloch Lodge is located on the loch. The Garvault is a small lodging located north of the loch. The River Helmsdale flows through the Loch Achnamoine to the North Sea. Flowing in are currents from Loch nan Clar as well as the River Uidh a' Chlarain, which brings in water from the nearby Loch na Gaineime. Many small streams flow into Loch Badanloch such as the Badanloch burn, Allt na Meinne, Allt a' Mhuillin, Caochan Ruadh, Allt nam Meann and many others, some of which come from Loch Nan Clar.

Many named peaks disrupt the horizon, some of which qualify as mountains. On the coasts of the loch includes Cnoc Uidh a' Chlarain and Bandanloch Hill in Badanloch Forest, the source of the Badanloch Burn. Meall an t-Socaich is the tallest peak nearby and the slightly taller Creag an t-Socaich sits by the banks of Loch na Gaineimhe. The nearest mountain is Creag an Alltan Fhearna and just south is the trio of Creag Liath, Creag an Lochain and the tallest one, Cnoc an Liath-Bhaid Mhoir.

== Transport ==
Rail line B871 as well as a small collection of rural tracks run through the south of the Loch. One runs to Loch Choire through Gearnsary. Smaller paths link the main one to the banks of Lochan an Alltan Fhearna The other runs further south to Loch na Gaineime. The closest rail access is Kinbrace railway station.

== Tourism ==
This loch and the neighboring Loch Rimsdale and Loch Nan Clar are tourist destinations. Loch Bandanloch has two nearby lodges, the Sheppard's Cottage and the Garvault. Fishing and hiking compete with other lochs. Trout is the most common catch, while salmon can be found both there and in the River Helmsdale. Many hiking trains are there.

== Badanloch lodge ==
Bandanloch lodge is a settlement with permanent residents. Sheppard's Cottage lodging is there.

== Archaeology ==
Flint implements were found on a "neck of sand" in one area of the loch shore that was reclaimed by the water. It was located between the current shore and Rubha Mor, linking them.
