= Douglas George Ross =

British chief constable

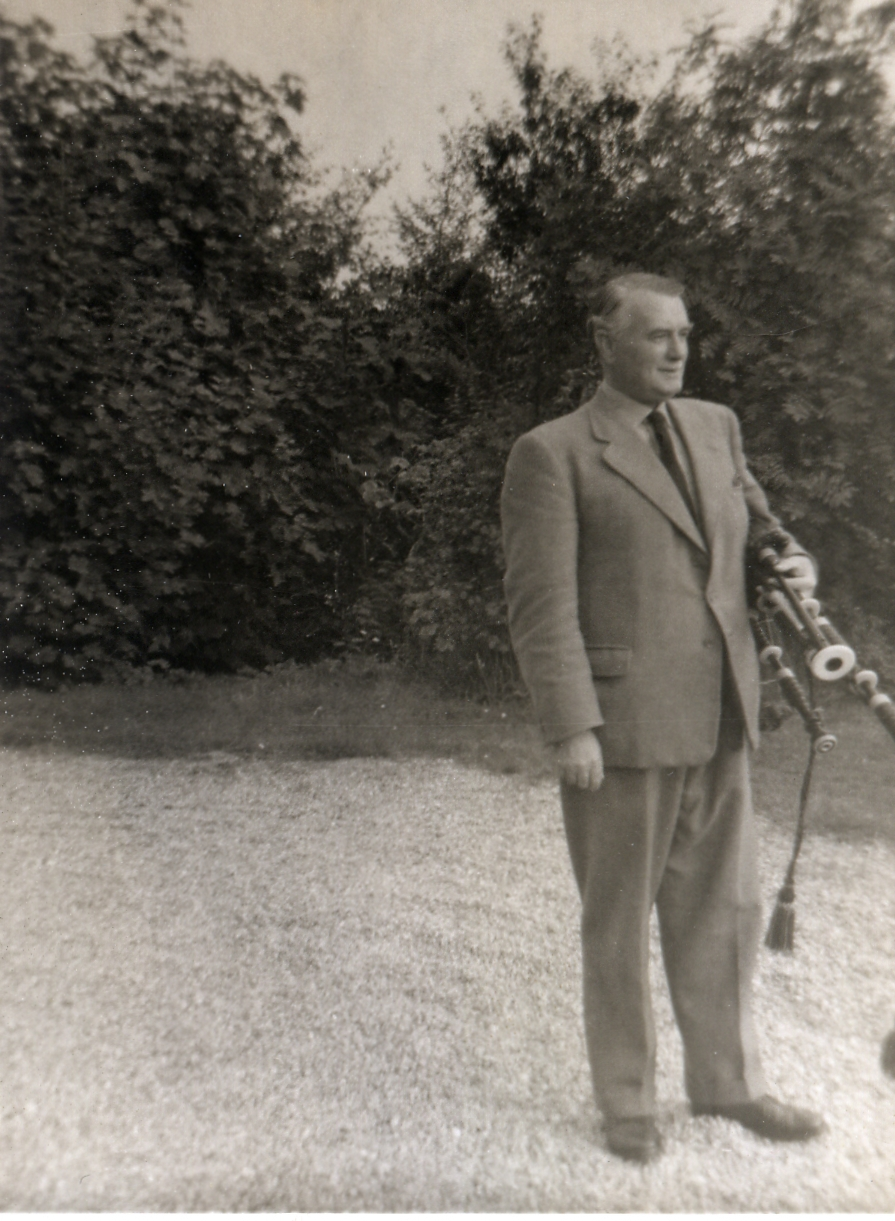
Ross in 1958

Douglas George Ross OBE KPM (6 April 1897 – 1980) was a British police officer who served as Chief Constable of Sutherland from 1933 to 1962.

The son of Roderick Ross, then serving in Canterbury City Police, he was born in Ramsgate, Kent, England. After active service with the Royal Scots between 1915 and 1919, he joined the Manchester City Police in 1920. He then transferred to Edinburgh City Police, of which his father was then Chief Constable, in 1922 and rose through the ranks to Superintendent. He was appointed Chief Constable of Sutherland on 5 May 1933. His starting salary was £400 per annum, which rose by £20 every second year until 1939. He continued as Chief Constable for 29 years, retiring on 5 April 1962, the day before his 65th birthday. He was Sutherland's last but one Chief Constable.

Ross served as Chief Constable at the same time as his father was still Chief Constable of Edinburgh (1900–1935) and his older brother Donald (died 1981) was Chief Constable of Argyllshire (1927–1961). Douglas Ross died in 1980 in Haddington.
