= Loch Achnamoine =

Mountain loch in Scotland

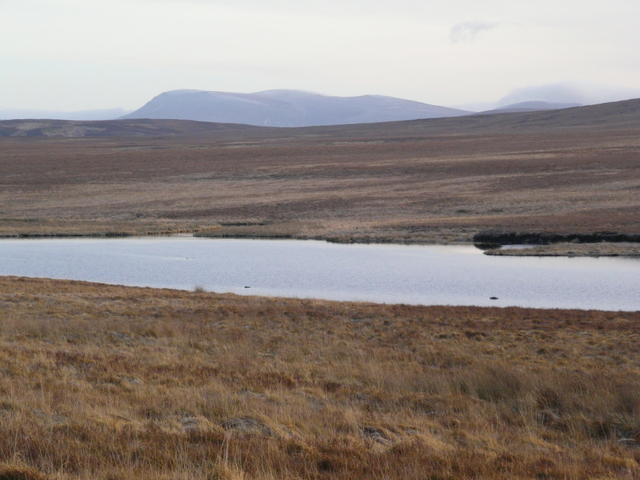
- Loch Achnamoine, from the road on its northern shore

- Location within Scotland
- Location: Scottish Highlands
- Coordinates: 58°15′40″N 4°01′21″W
- Primary outflows: River Helmsdale
- Basin countries: Scotland, United Kingdom
- Max. length: 1.38 km (0.86 mi)
- Max. width: 397 m (1,302 ft)
- Surface elevation: 114.1 m (374 ft)

Loch Achnamoine is a small mountain loch, situated on the River Helmsdale in the Highland council area of Scotland. The nearest settlement to it is Kinbrace, a small village 2.5 miles (4 km) east, along a small country road.

The name derives from the Scottish Gaelic elements "achadh" and "mòine", meaning "Lake of the Peat-field".

Loch Achnamoine is a drift dam, formed from the last glacial period in Scotland. The loch was the site of several biological surveys in the 1990s, identifying several species of xanthidium in its waters
