= Strath of Kildonan =

Valley in Scottish Highlands

Coordinates: 58.156°N 3.845°W

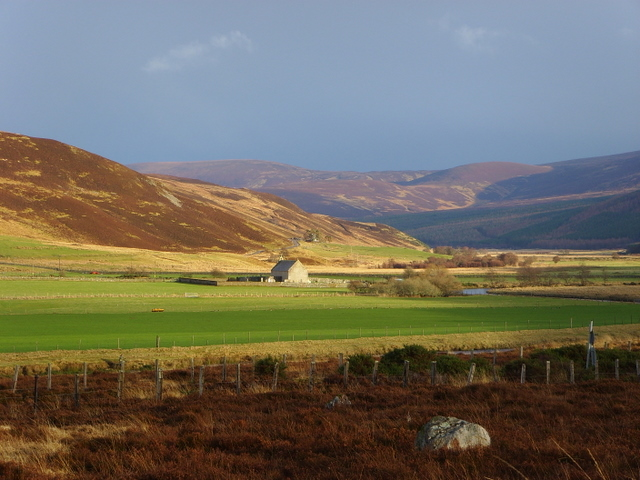
Strath of Kildonan

Strath of Kildonan, also known as Strath Ullie, (Scottish Gaelic: Srath Ilidh), is a strath in Sutherland, in the north of Scotland. It extends in a north-westerly direction from Helmsdale towards Kinbrace.

== History ==
In 1813, during the Highland Clearances, a group of 50-60 men planned an ambush from the settlement of Suisgill in the Strath of Kildonan against a number of men who were employed by the Sutherland Estate in evicting tenants to make way for sheep farming. The estate men who were on horseback were tipped off in advance but were still pursued by the 50-60 men on foot, who as historian James Hunter described, had acted "just as their ancestors had done when launching one of the charges characteristic of clan warfare". Although the men on horseback escaped, another small group who were employed by the Sutherland Estate to carry out evictions as part of the Highland Clearances were caught in the Strath of Kildonan and surrounded by a mob of about 100 people. These Sutherland Estate employees were mostly shepherds and were permitted to leave as long as they did not return and their leader was told not show his face in the Strath of Kildonan again.

In 1869, gold was found in the Strath and was exploited by local crofters and outside prospectors until the enterprise became unprofitable. A following depression in the local economy caused crofters to resume gold digging, which by 1886 brought them into conflict with the Sutherland Estates.

== Geography ==
The River Helmsdale (also known as River Ullie) flows down the strath and into the sea at Helmsdale.

The A897 road runs along the strath, as does the Far North Line, with Kildonan railway station halfway along.
