= Bradford City Police =

Municipal police force in Yorkshire, England

City of Bradford Police

Agency overview
- Formed: 1897
- Dissolved: 1974

Jurisdictional structure
- Operations jurisdiction: Bradford, Yorkshire, England, United Kingdom
- Area: 143 sq mi (370 km^{2})
- Population: 216,495
- Legal jurisdiction: England & Wales
- Governing body: Bradford Corporation
- Constituting instrument: City of Bradford Act 1897
- General nature: Local civilian police

Operational structure
- Headquarters: Bradford City Hall (1897-1974)
- Divisions: 3

Facilities
- Stations: 20

The Bradford City Police (Previously the Bradford Borough Police before 1897) was the municipal police force of the city of Bradford, Yorkshire, England, UK.

== History ==
Bradford Borough Charter was granted in 1847, and Bradford Corporation acquired all the statutory powers from the old Municipal Corporation. In 1848, the Bradford Borough Police was amalgamated, with a Borough HQ No. 24-26 Swaine Street.

- 30 November 1847, William Leveratt (1804-1876) was appointed as Head Constable
- 1854 Southgate, Great Horton
- 1859 Reservoir Lodge, Church St Manningham
- 1859 Manchester Rd/ Mill St
- 1859 Wakefield Rd/ Rutland St East Bowling

Bradford was granted city status in 1897.

During the Second World War, many places of worship were turned into auxiliary stations for the Bradford City Police, such as Greenhill Methodist Church, which was later demolished and the site it was on is now occupied by Eccleshill Library.

By 1968, all of the other police forces within the traditional county of West Yorkshire had merged to become the West Yorkshire Constabulary. Only Leeds and Bradford remained independent until they too, were merged into the new West Yorkshire Police Service, six years' later in 1974.

== Divisional structure ==
For operational purposes, Bradford Police was divided into three divisions. The force headquarters was in Bradford City Hall. The divisions with their associated stations and divisional identifiers were:

A	East Bradford	New Leeds, Bowling, Eccleshill, Idle, Tong, Thornbury, Thackley and Tyersal
B	South West Bradford	Little Horton, Great Horton, Wibsey, Buttershaw, Low Moor and Wyke
C	North West Bradford	Manningham, Allerton, Heaton, Thornton, Frizinghall and Sandy Lane

=== Special Service ===
- Traffic Division.
- Underwater Search & Rescue Team.
- Police Dog Section.

=== Transport ===
- Morris Eight 1935–1948
- Ford Anglia 1939–1967
- Morris Minor 1948–1971
- Ford Zodiac 1951–1972
- Mini 1959–1974
- Rover P6 2000 1963–1973
- Hillman Imp 1963–1974
- Ford Transit 1965–1974
- Ford Escort 1968–1974
- Rover P6 3500 1968–1974
- Austin Maxi 1969–1974
- Land Rover Range Rover Classic 1970–1974
