= Helmsdale =

Coordinates: 58.12°N 3.66°W

Helmsdale: Scottish Gaelic: Bun Ilidh; Scots: Helmsdal
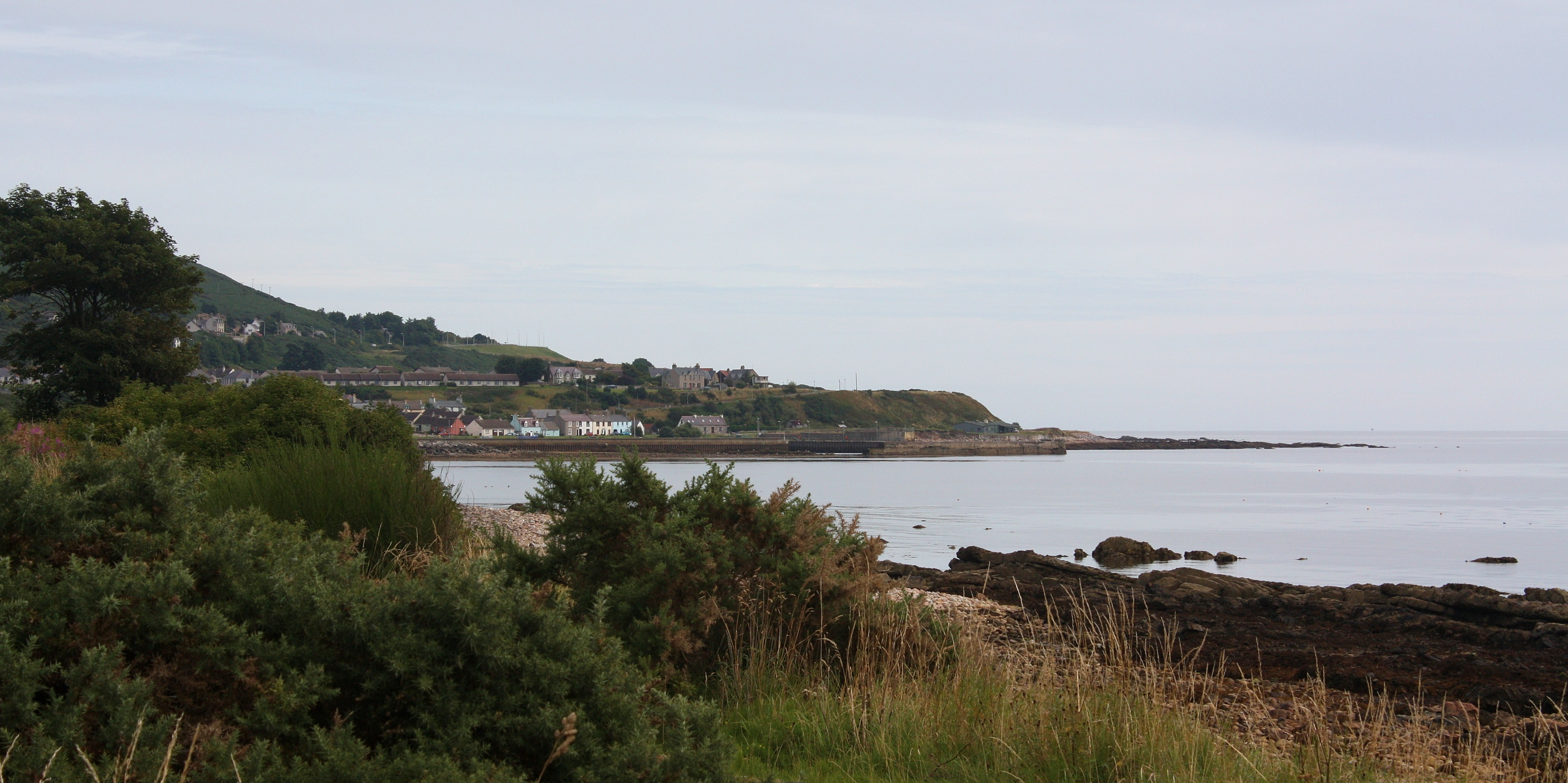

- Location within the Sutherland area
- Population: 764 (2011)
- OS grid reference: ND025155
  - Edinburgh: 151 mi (243 km)
  - London: 478 mi (769 km)
- Council area: Highland
- Lieutenancy area: Sutherland
- Country: Scotland
- Sovereign state: United Kingdom
- Post town: HELMSDALE
- Postcode district: KW8
- Dialling code: 01431
- Police: Scotland
- Fire: Scottish
- Ambulance: Scottish
- UK Parliament: Caithness, Sutherland and Easter Ross
- Scottish Parliament: Caithness, Sutherland and Ross

Helmsdale (Scots: Helmsdal, Scottish Gaelic: Bun Ilidh) is a village on the east coast of Sutherland, in the Highland council area of Scotland. The modern village was planned in 1814 to resettle communities that had been removed from the surrounding straths as part of the Highland Clearances.

== Toponymy ==
The River Helmsdale (Scottish Gaelic: Ilidh) was noted by Ptolemy as Ila, which remains an obscure name. The Gaelic name for the village, Bun Ilidh, means 'Ilie-foot'. Norse settlers called the strath Hjalmundal, meaning 'Dale of the Helmet', from which the modern village name Helmsdale is derived.

== History ==
The remains of Helmsdale Castle were demolished in the 1970s in order to build the new A9 road bridge.

The castle was the location of the murder of the 11th Earl of Sutherland and his Countess, Marion Seton, in 1567. They were poisoned by Isobel Sinclair, the wife of Gordon of Gartly. Isobel Sinclair's own son also died, but the fifteen-year-old heir of Sutherland, Alexander, was unharmed. He was made to marry the 4th Earl of Caithness’s daughter, Lady Barbara Sinclair. In 1569 he escaped from the Sinclairs to Huntly Castle.

The previous road bridge, which still stands, was designed by Thomas Telford and completed in 1811.

=== Highland Clearances ===
Helmsdale was a planned community to receive run rig tenant farmers (crofters) displaced from the Strath of Kildonan by Elizabeth Leveson-Gower, Countess of Sutherland, with the Kildonan clearances of 1813–1819 leading to riots, where an angry mob drove out of the valley the prospective sheep farmers who had been invited by the countess to view the land; a situation of confrontation existed for more than six weeks, with factor Patrick Sellar and estate staff being deputised as special constables and military assistance being sent from Fort George. Eventual concessions included favourable prices paid for cattle and an organised party of 94 people emigrating with the assistance of Thomas Douglas, 5th Earl of Selkirk to his Red River Colony, via a hard journey and a bitter winter in Hudson Bay, eventually helping found the city of Winnipeg and contributing to a Gaelic speaking culture in Manitoba for some time. The crofters' resistance to the Clearances was to the shock of the countess and her advisers, who were, in the words of historian Eric Richards, "genuinely astonished at this response to plans which they regarded as wise and benevolent". Crofter settlements were burned and abandoned ruins can still be seen in the 21st century, though descendants of the cleared crofters were looking to repurchase the lands from the Sutherlands' descendants in 2017.

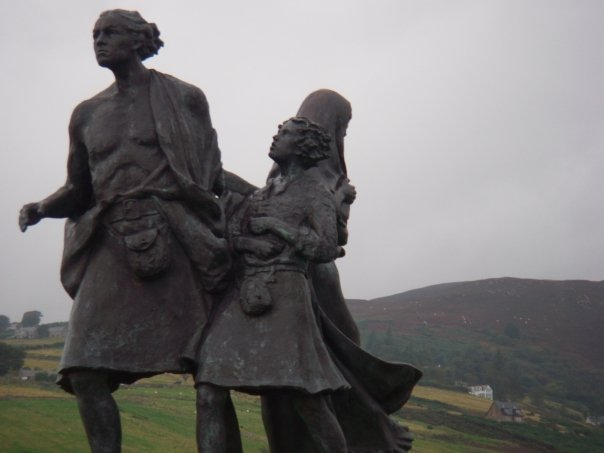
The statue The Emigrants commemorates the flight of Highlanders during the Clearances, but it is also a testament to their accomplishments in the places they settled. Located at the foot of the Highland Mountains in Helmsdale.

On 23 July 2007, the Scottish First Minister Alex Salmond unveiled a three-metre-high (10-foot) bronze statue, The Emigrants (Scottish Gaelic: Na h-Eilthirich) by Gerald Laing, in Helmsdale, which commemorates the people who were cleared from the area by landowners and left their homeland to begin new lives overseas. The statue, which depicts a family leaving their home, stands at the mouth of the Strath of Kildonan and was funded by Dennis Macleod, a Scottish-Canadian mining millionaire who also attended the ceremony. An identical three-metre-high bronze Exiles statue has also been set up on the banks of the Red River in Winnipeg.

=== Gold rush ===
Two tributaries of the river were the scene of the Kildonan Gold Rush in 1869. The history of Kildonan's gold started in 1818, when a single nugget of gold was found near the Suisgill and Kildonan burns. Late in 1868, a brief announcement in a local newspaper stated that gold had been discovered at Kildonan in the county of Sutherland. The credit for the discovery goes to Robert Nelson Gilchrist, a native of Kildonan, who had spent 17 years in the goldfields of Australia. On his return home, the Duke of Sutherland gave him permission to pan the gravels of the Helmsdale River, and he prospected all the burns and tributaries.

=== Fishing ===
The Six Inch second Edition Ordnance Survey Map of Helmsdale shows that the harbour in Helmsdale, which was constructed at the time of the Clearances, was rather small. In the annual report for 1900 it is reported that "fishermen at this creek are very much handicapped by the want of a suitable landing place for their boats and fish, the fish being landed on the beach, and then carted into Helmsdale for sale". In the report for 1908 the report refers to "herring fishing prosecuted from various centres" - presumable facilitated by the shift from sail to steam.

Fishery Statistics

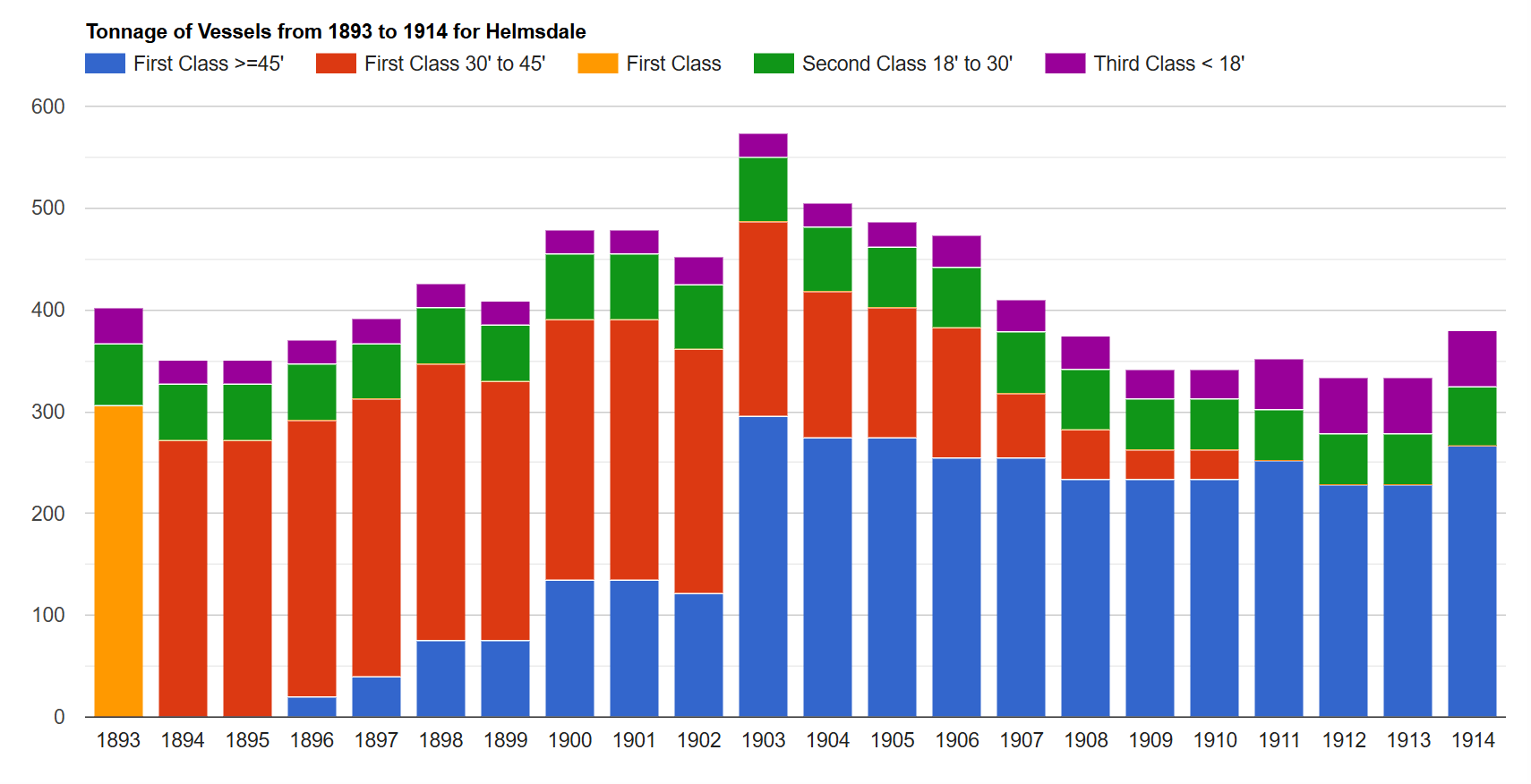
Tonnage of vessels

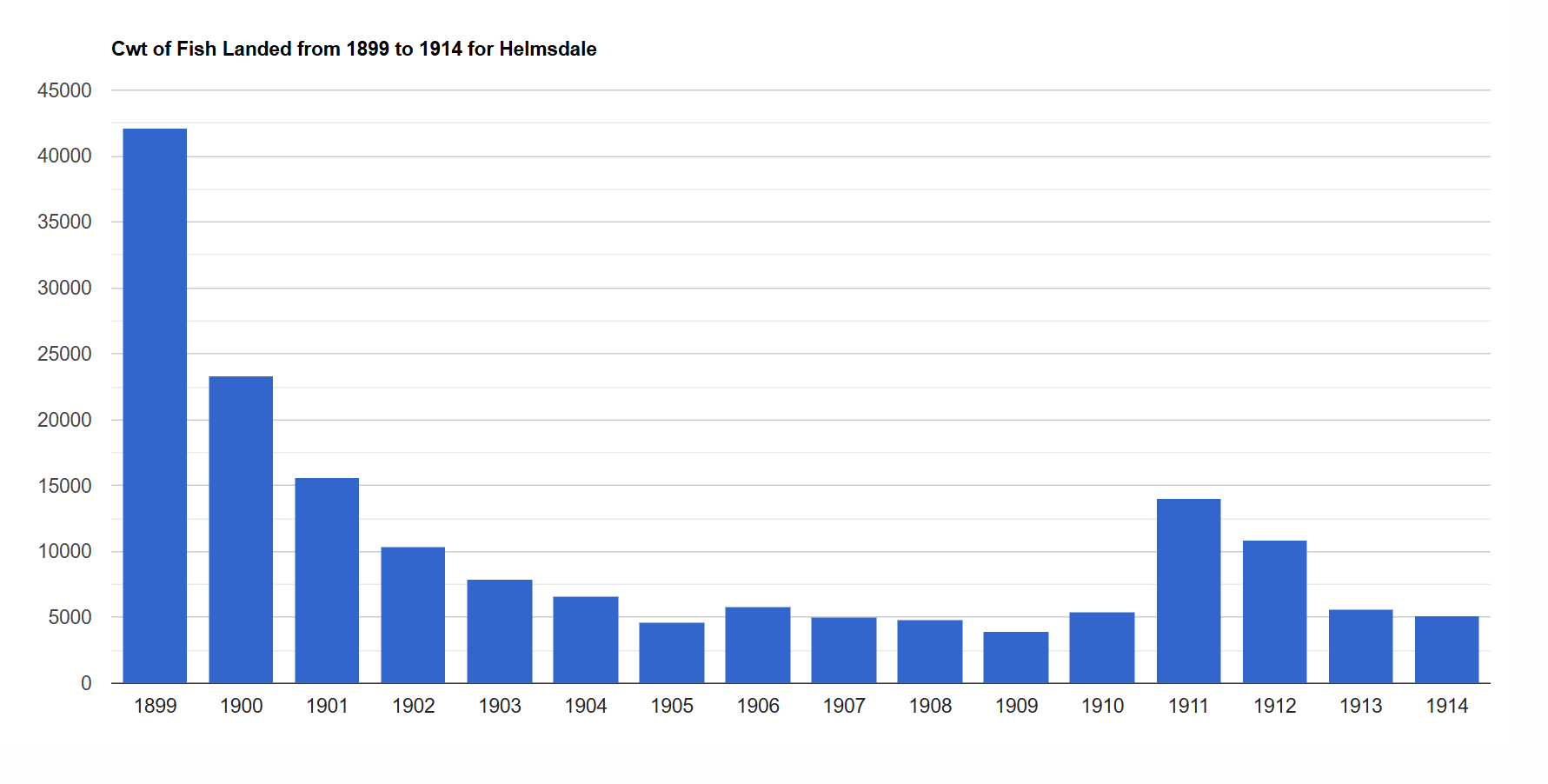
Cwt of fish landed

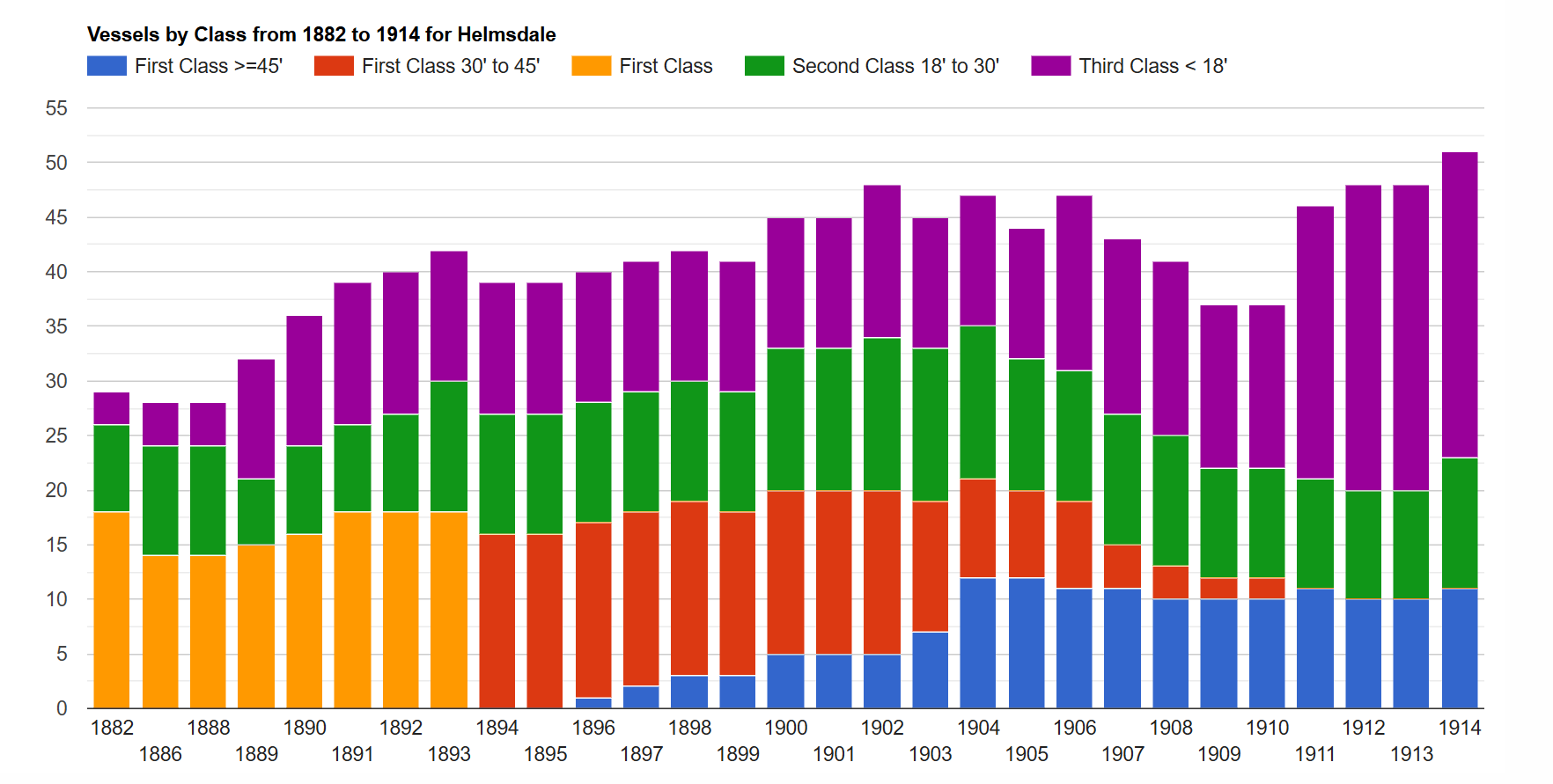
Vessels by class

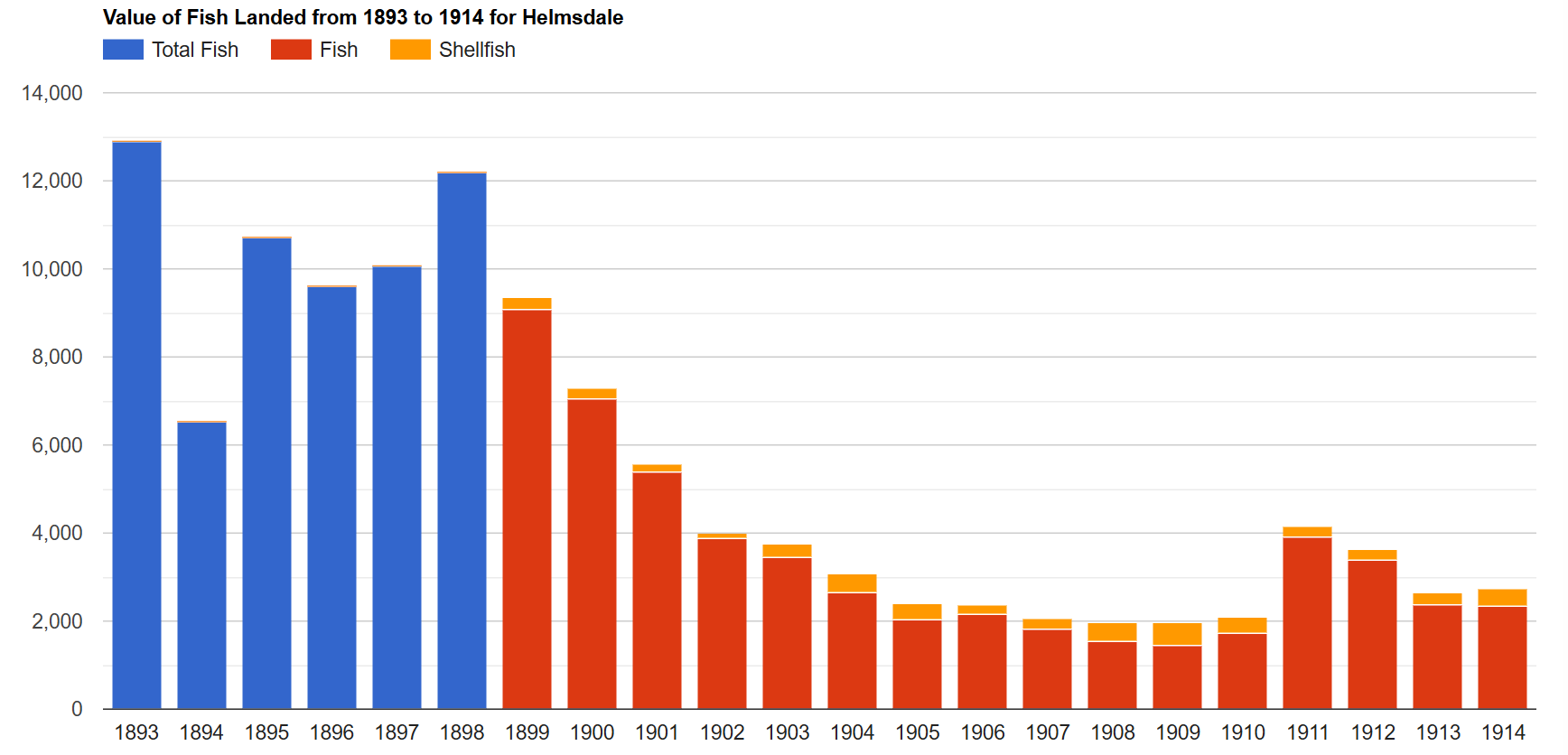
Value (£] of fish landed

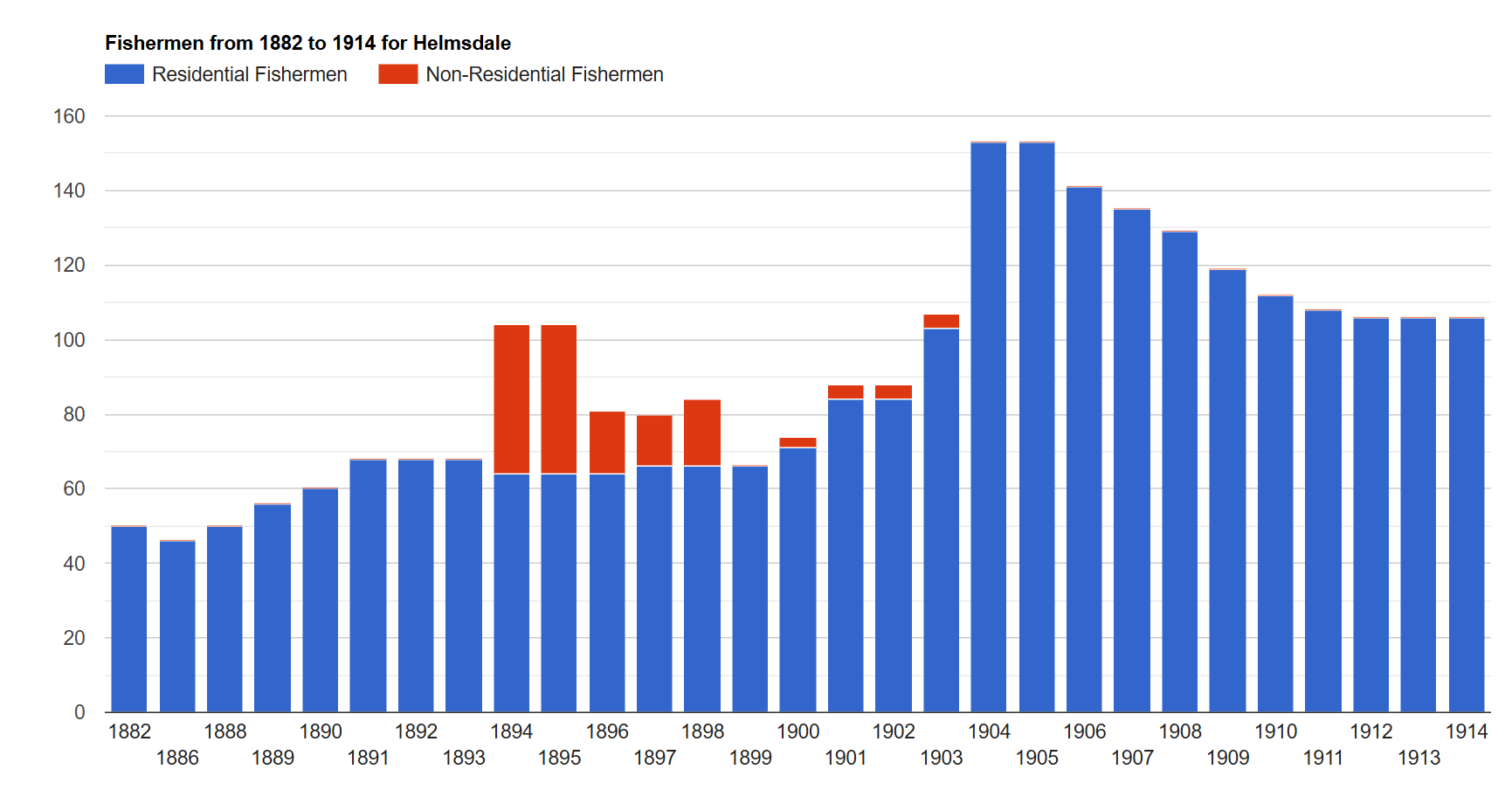
Fishermen

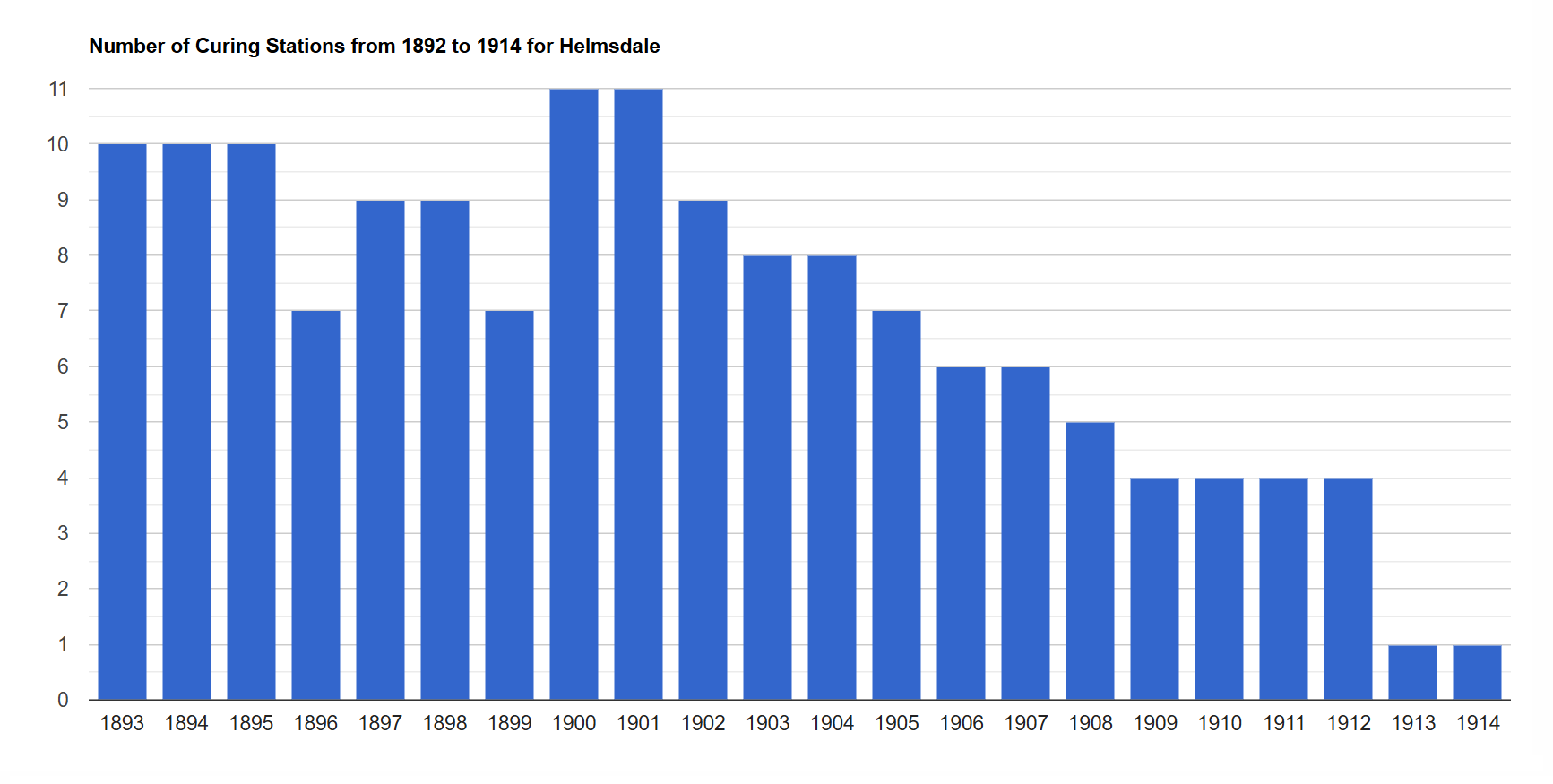
Number of curing stations

=== Second World War and after ===
During the Second World War, the Royal Air Force (RAF) built Loth Chain Home radar station at Crakaig, a few miles south-west of Helmsdale. There was also an RAF Chain Home Low radar station at Navidale, about one mile (1.5 kilometres) northeast of Helmsdale. During the Cold War there was a Composite Signals Organisation (CSO) radio monitoring station in Helmsdale itself. The CSO is associated with GCHQ.

=== 21st century developments ===
On 3 August 2008, Highland Council announced plans to modernise and catalyse industry in Helmsdale and its surrounding areas. This included a £3.5 million revamp of the harbour and the development of two battery processing factories. Work on the harbour was set to begin in spring 2009, while the battery plants were expected to open before May 2009. It was hoped up to 50 new jobs would be created.

On 7 August 2024, King Charles III visited Helmsdale railway station to mark the 150th anniversary of the Sutherland and Caithness Railway. The king met railway workers, representatives of Helmsdale Community Council and members of Sutherland Schools Pipe Band. He afterwards laid flowers at Helmsdale War Memorial to mark its centenary and met veterans and members of the local community.

== Location and transport ==
West Helmsdale lies across the river from the main village above the railway station; Old Helmsdale is immediately to the north while East Helmsdale is a settlement less than one mile (1.5 kilometres) east.

The village is on the A9 road, at a junction with the A897 to Melvich, and has a railway station on the Far North Line. Buses operate about every two hours from Monday to Saturday and infrequently on Sundays from Helmsdale to Brora, Golspie, Dornoch, Tain and Inverness in the south and Berriedale, Dunbeath, Halkirk, Thurso and Scrabster in the north. These are on routes X98 and X99 and are operated by Stagecoach Highlands, but tickets can be bought on the Citylink website.

== Tourism, culture and sport ==
Facilities in Helmsdale include an independent youth hostel, a heritage centre, an art gallery, and an inn.

Helmsdale hosts a Highland Games which are held on the third Saturday in August each year. For the evening Marquee Dance the village population of 700 doubles thanks to visitors attending the dance.

Helmsdale is home to Bunillidh Thistle F.C. and Helmsdale United.

== Economy ==
Helmsdale is a fishing port at the estuary of the River Helmsdale. It was once the home of one of the largest herring fleets in Europe.

== Notable people ==
- Angus Sutherland (1848-1922), son of a crofter whose parents had suffered eviction as part of the Highland Clearances, and born in Helmsdale, he became the local MP, served for nine years, and went on to be the Chairman of the Fishery Board for Scotland.
- Andrew Rutherford (1929–1998), Vice-Chancellor of the University of London from 1994 to 1997.
- David Mackay (pilot), Chief Pilot of Virgin Galactic, and a former test pilot. Became the 569th person to enter space and Scotland's first astronaut.
- Edwyn Collins, singer from band Orange Juice lives in the village.
- Matthew Horne, actor most notable for Gavin & Stacey lives in the village.

== See also ==
- Badbea clearance village
