= River Helmsdale =

River in the Highlands of Scotland

Coordinates: 58°07′N 3°40′W

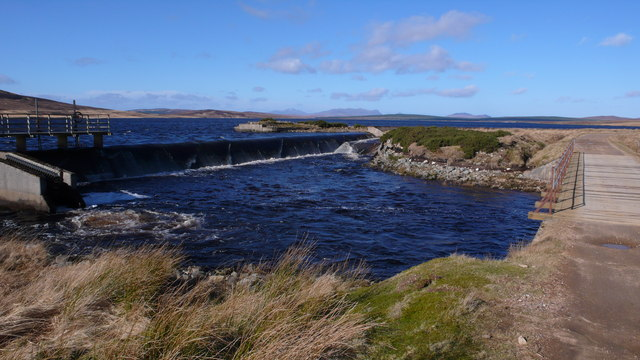
River Helmsdale flowing out of Loch Badanloch

The River Helmsdale (sometimes known as the River Ullie) (Scottish Gaelic: Ilidh / Abhainn Ilidh) is one of the major east-flowing rivers of Sutherland in the Highlands of Scotland. It flows broadly southeastwards from Loch Badanloch down the Strath of Kildonan (otherwise known as Strath Ullie), gathering the waters of the Bannock Burn on its left and the Abhainn na Frithe on its right before discharging into the Moray Firth on the North Sea at the town of Helmsdale. Other significant tributaries of the Helmsdale include the left-bank Suisgill Burn and the right-bank Craggie Water. Loch Achnamoine which is just over 1 km in length, lies on the line of the river 1 mi / 1.5 km downstream of Loch Badanloch. Loch Badanloch is one of a complex of three interconnecting lochs - the other two being Loch nan Clàr and Loch Rimsdale which gather waters from the moors on the southern edge of the Flow Country via the Allt an Lòin Tharsuinn, Allt Lòn a' Chùil and Rimsdale Burn.

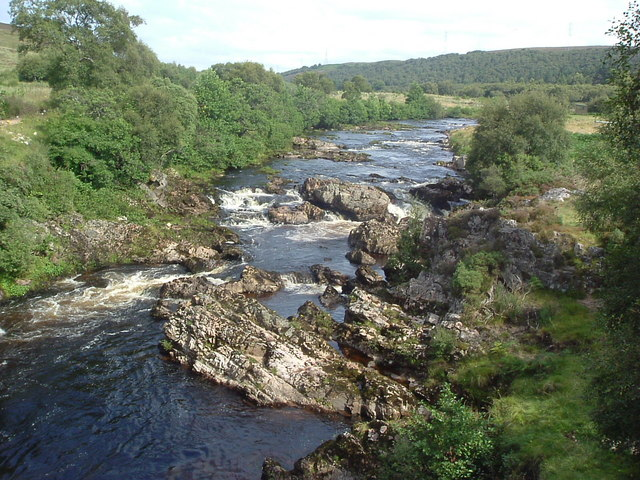
River near Kildonan railway station

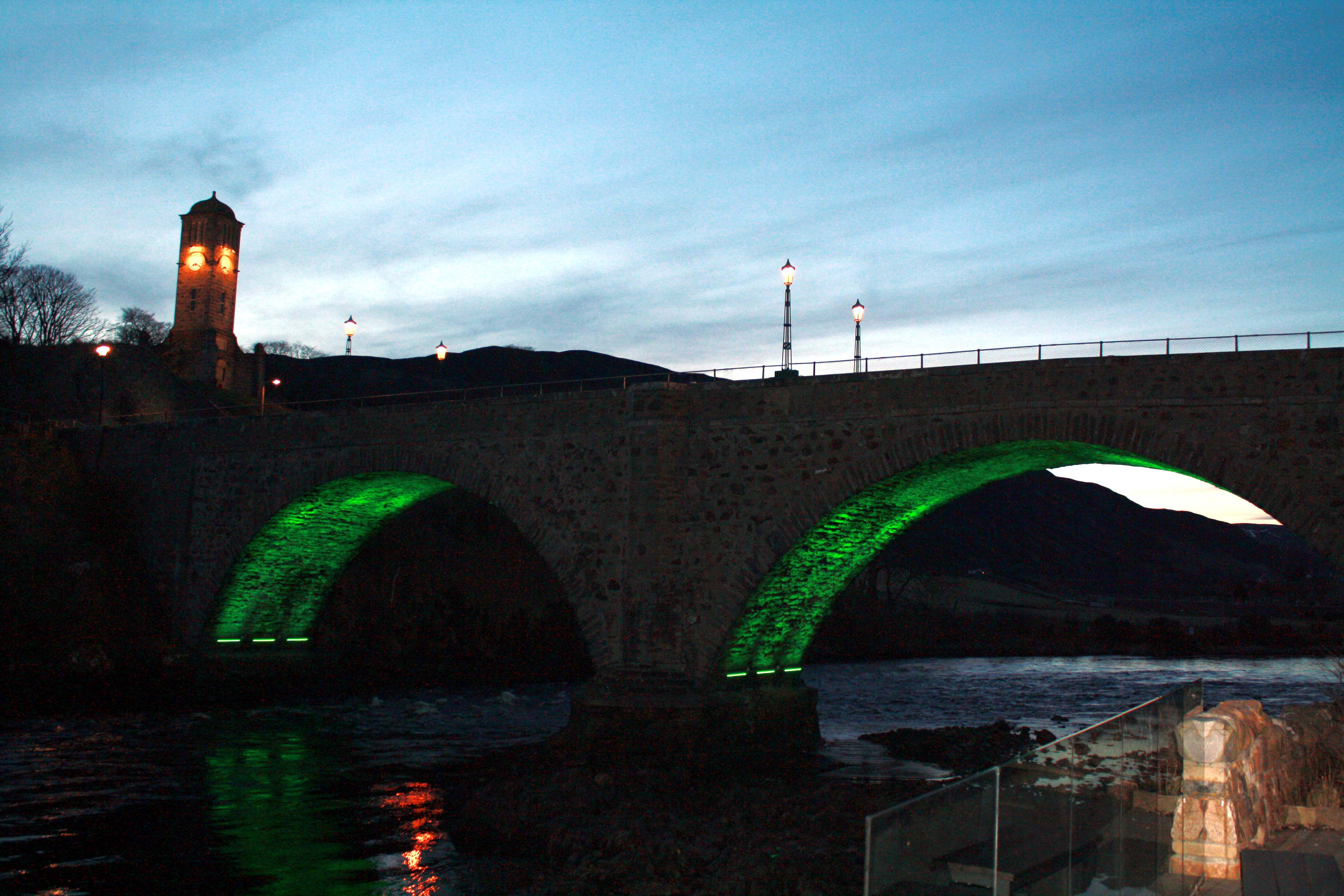
Old bridge in Helmsdale
