= Scotland Loves Animation =

Scottish anime festival

- Location: Edinburgh and Glasgow
- Founded: 2010
- Founded by: Andrew Partridge
- Festival date: Glasgow: 6 November - 8 November 2026 London: 13 - 15 November 2026 Edinburgh: 16 - 22 November 2026
- Language: International
- Website: http://www.lovesanimation.com

Scotland Loves Animation is a charity that promotes Japanese animation in Scotland. They hold an annual film festival called "Scotland Loves Anime" (often abbreviated to SLA) each autumn, and work with other festivals to programme anime content into their schedules. The 17th edition of the festival will take place between 6 and 22 November 2026.

== Background ==
Scotland Loves Animation was established in 2010 by Andrew Partridge, who later went on to start the Glasgow-based anime distributor Anime Limited. The charity's remit is to promote animation as an art form in Scotland, particularly focusing on anime.

It does this through running the annual Scotland Loves Anime film festival, partnering with Scottish universities to host education days and workshops, and partnering with other film festivals and independent cinemas to show anime films and other anime-related content through the rest of the year, such as the Glasgow Film Festival at the Glasgow Film Theatre and the Discovery Film Festival at the DCA.

== Education days ==
Scotland Loves Animation hosts Education Days alongside the film festival where students can meet industry professionals in a full day of talks, panel discussions, and workshops. These take place at the University of Edinburgh and are hosted by author and Scotland Loves Anime jury chairman Jonathan Clements. The events feature a guest line-up of directors and animators from the Japanese animation and film industry. Previous guests have included The Garden of Words director Makoto Shinkai and Promare director Hiroyuki Imaishi.

== Screen Anime ==
In May 2020, Anime Limited launched a new online festival in partnership with Scotland Loves Animation, called Screen Anime. This service hosted 4 films and one TV series monthly. It was also used to host the 2020 edition of Scotland Loves Anime. It was available in the UK and Ireland only. The service ended on 25 May 2021, as cinemas reopened in the UK.

== Film festival ==
The Scotland Loves Anime film festival takes place every autumn in Glasgow and Edinburgh, screening a variety of anime films from the past year alongside well-loved classics, with each being introduced by Jonathan Clements. The festival typically runs over a weekend in Glasgow, and over a week in Edinburgh.

=== Locations and venues ===
The festival is held in the Glasgow Film Theatre in Glasgow and the in The Cameo in Edinburgh. The Edinburgh Filmhouse hosted the Edinburgh festival from 2010 to 2021 and the Belmont Filmhouse hosted the Aberdeen festival from 2015 to 2020, but in October 2022 the Centre for the Moving Image went into administration, closing these cinemas.

Other events have included a festival in Aberdeen and Sheffield, along with a touring festival across the country. The latter was brought back in 2021 and saw various Picturehouse locations around the country screen the most popular films of the 2021 festival.

The 2023 festival was held in November for the first time. In 2024, the festival expanded to London, with a weekend of screenings held at Picturehouse Central.

The 2025 festival returned to the Edinburgh Filmhouse for a single screening of ChaO.

=== Guests ===
The festival regularly invites directors and animators to host Q&A sessions after their films have been screened. Previous Q&A sessions have included Naoko Yamada after the European Premiere of K-On! the Movie and Tomoki Kyoda after the European Premiere of Eureka Seven: Hi-Evolution Movie 1.

=== Awards ===
The festival offers two awards, the jury award and the audience award, each awarded to a film out of a selection of in-competition films that year.

The jury award, nicknamed the Golden Partridge after festival director Andrew Partridge, is awarded by a panel of judges made up by professionals from the media and the animation industry. The jury chairman is Jonathan Clements. The jury will watch the in-competition films for the first time alongside the audience and, after seeing all the films in competition, debate privately and vote on which film to give the award to.

The audience award is awarded by the audience, who rate each in-competition film after seeing it using an online form. Earlier festivals had audience members take a lollipop stick and deposit it in one of several containers with the ratings on. These ratings are counted and averaged to identify the winner.

=== List of festivals ===
Year	Dates	Films	Other information
2010	Glasgow: 8–10 October Edinburgh: 15–17 October	The Disappearance of Haruhi Suzumiya (UK Premiere); One Piece: Strong World (UK Premiere); Trigun: Badlands Rumble (UK Premiere); Professor Layton and the Eternal Diva (Scottish Premiere); Redline (Scottish Premiere); Summer Wars (Scottish Premiere)	A special screening of Summer Wars was held at the DCA in Dundee, Scotland.
2011	Glasgow: 7–9 October Edinburgh: 14–16 October	Into the Forest of the Fireflies' Light (EU Premiere); Mardock Scramble: The Second Combustion (EU Premiere); A Letter to Momo (UK Premiere); Coicent / Five Numbers! (UK Premiere); Colorful (UK Premiere); Escaflowne: The Movie (UK Premiere); The Princess and the Pilot (UK Premiere); Interstella 5555: The 5tory of the 5ecret 5tar 5ystem; Tekken: Blood Vengeance 3D	Into the Forest of the Fireflies' Light won the first ever Golden Partridge award, even though it was a short film.
2012	Glasgow: 12–14 October Edinburgh: 19–21 October	Nerawareta Gakuen (World Premiere); Anime Mirai Project (EU Premiere); Berserk – The Battle for Doldrey (EU Premiere); K-On! The Movie (EU Premiere); Blood-C: The Last Dark (UK Premiere); The Egg of the King (UK Premiere); Phoenix Wright – Ace Attorney (UK Premiere); Afterschool Midnighters (Scottish Premiere); Wolf Children (Scottish Premiere)	Berserk – The Battle for Doldrey won the Golden Partridge, but only because Wolf Children wasn't in competition due to it not being a UK premiere. This rule was relaxed the next year.
2013	Glasgow: 11–13 October Edinburgh: 14–20 October	Aura – Koga Maryuin's Last War (EU Premiere); Fuse - Memoires of the Hunter Girl (EU Premiere); The Garden of Words (EU Premiere); HAL (EU Premiere); Steins;Gate – The Movie (EU Premiere); Evangelion 3.0: You Can (Not) Redo (UK Premiere); The Life of Budori Gusuko (UK Premiere); Patema Inverted (UK Premiere); Evangelion 1.0: You Are (Not) Alone; Evangelion 2.0: You Can (Not) Advance; Hunter x Hunter The Movie: Phantom Rouge; Perfect Blue; The Place Promised in our Early Days	This year focused on the works of Makoto Shinkai. He was present for a Q&A after the EU Premiere of The Garden of Words. Patema Inverted won both the Golden Partridge and the new Audience Award. This year was also the first year the festival ran for more than a weekend at Edinburgh.
2014	Glasgow: 10–12 October Edinburgh: 13–19 October	Lupin the 3rd vs. Detective Conan: The Movie (EU Premiere); Appleseed Alpha (UK Premiere); Bayonetta: Bloody Fate (UK Premiere); K: Missing Kings (UK Premiere); Dragon Ball Z: Battle of Gods (Scottish Premiere); Giovanni's Island (Scottish Premiere); Time of Eve (Scottish Premiere); Cowboy Bebop: The Movie; Ghost in the Shell; Princess and the Pilot; Sword of the Stranger; Wings of Honneamise	The staff from Studio Bones were present for a special screening of a few episodes of Space Dandy and a Q&A. Giovanni's Island won the Golden Partridge and the Audience Award.
2015	Glasgow: 9–11 October Edinburgh: 12–18 October Aberdeen: 24–25 October	Animator Expo (EU Premiere); Attack on Titan Parts 1 + 2 (EU Premiere); Empire of Corpses (EU Premiere); Expelled from Paradise (EU Premiere); Love Live! The School Idol Movie (EU Premiere); Attack on Titan: Crimson Bow & Arrow (UK Premiere); Attack on Titan: The Wings of Freedom (UK Premiere); Boruto: Naruto the Movie (UK Premiere); Ghost in the Shell (2015) (UK Premiere); The Last: Naruto the Movie (Scottish Premiere); Miss Hokusai (UK Premiere); The Murder Case of Hana & Alice (UK Premiere); Psycho-Pass: The Movie (UK Premiere); Puella Magi Madoka Magica the Movie Part III: Rebellion (UK Premiere); Dragon Ball Z – Resurrection 'F' (Scottish Premiere)	The festival expanded into Aberdeen for the first time. Miss Hokusai won the Golden Partridge and The Murder Case of Hana & Alice won the Audience Award. This was also the year that Anime Limited started a discussion podcast about the films that are shown in competition at the festival. This podcast is hosted by the jury of the festival.
2016	Glasgow: 14–16 October Edinburgh: 17–23 October Aberdeen: 9–11 December	A Silent Voice (EU Premiere); Girls und Panzer der Film (EU Premiere); Accel World: Infinite Burst (UK Premiere); Kizumonogatari Part 1 and 2 (UK Premiere); Momotaro, Sacred Sailors (UK Premiere); Persona 3 the Movie #1 (UK Premiere); Princess Arete (UK premiere); Kingsglaive: Final Fantasy XV (Scottish Premiere); Project Itoh: Harmony (Scottish Premiere); Your Name. (Scottish Premiere); Anthem of the Heart; Belladonna of Sadness; Pigtails & Other Short Stories; The Place Promised in our Early Days; Redline; Voices of a Distant Star & Garden of Words (Double Bill)	Makoto Shinkai was once again the focus of this festival, as his new film Your Name. had its Scottish premiere at the festival. A Silent Voice also had its first screening outside of Japan at the festival. Both of these films sold out, and would go on to require additional screenings. Both the Golden Partridge and Audience award went to Your Name. this year.
2017	Glasgow: 13–15 October Edinburgh: 16–22 October Aberdeen: 2–3 December	Eureka Seven: Hi-Evolution Movie 1 (EU Premiere); The Dragon Dentist (UK Premiere); Fireworks (UK Premiere); Kizumonogatari Part 3 (UK Premiere); Tokyo Ghoul – Live Action (UK Premiere); Venus Wars (UK Premiere); Lu over the Wall (Scottish Premiere); A Silent Voice; Mind Game; Night is Short, Walk on Girl; Resident Evil: Degeneration; Resident Evil: Vendetta; Osama Tezuka's Metropolis; Tokyo Godfathers; Vampire Hunter D: Bloodlust; Your Name.	Lu over the Wall won both the Golden Partridge and Audience Award. Due to the overwhelmingly negative reception of Eureka Seven: Hi-Evolution Movie 1 at the festival, Anime Limited canceled their plans to run a wider theatrical release of all three the Eureka Seven: Hi-Evolution Movies.
2018	Glasgow: 12–14 October Edinburgh: 15–21 October Aberdeen: 7–8 December	Mobile Suit Gundam Thunderbolt Film 1: December Sky (EU Premiere); Mobile Suit Gundam Thunderbolt Film 2: Bandit Flower (EU Premiere); Calamity of a Zombie Girl (UK Premiere); Fate/stay night: Heaven's Feel I. presage flower (UK Premiere); I Want to Eat Your Pancreas (UK Premiere); Haikara-san: Here Comes Miss Modern – Film 1 (UK Premiere); My Hero Academia: Two Heroes (UK Premiere); Penguin Highway (UK Premiere); Mirai (Scottish Premiere); B: The Beginning; BLAME!; The Boy and the Beast; Cyber City Oedo 808; The Girl Who Leapt Through Time; Jin-Roh: The Wolf Brigade; Maquia: When the Promised Flower Blooms; Summer Wars; Wolf Children	This year focused on the works of Mamoru Hosoda. His latest film, Mirai, had its Scottish premiere at the festival. Penguin Highway won the Golden Partridge and I Want to Eat Your Pancreas won the Audience Award.
2019	Glasgow: 11–13 October Edinburgh: 14–20 October Aberdeen: 24–30 January (2020)	Eureka Seven Hi-Evolution: Anemone (EU Premiere); Children of the Sea (UK Premiere); The Girl from the Other Side: Siúil, a Rún (UK Premiere); Human Lost (UK Premiere); One Piece: Stampede (UK Premiere); Promare (UK Premiere); Psycho-Pass: Sinners of the System (UK Premiere); The Relative Worlds (UK Premiere); Ride Your Wave (UK Premiere); The Sacrament (UK Premiere); Weathering with You (UK Premiere); Birthday Wonderland (Scottish Premiere); A Silent Voice; The Case of Hana & Alice; Code Geass: Lelouch of the Resurrection; The Life of Budori Guskou; Patema Inverted	It was Scotland Loves Anime's biggest year yet, with over 3000 tickets sold. Weathering with You and Promare were the two biggest films this year, with over 1000 and 700 tickets sold for each respectively. The weekend of 19–20 October 2019 was the Edinburgh Filmhouse's 4th busiest weekend of all time, with the Saturday (19 October) having the most ticket sales in a single day in the history of the Filmhouse. Weathering with You was also Glasgow Film Theatre's second biggest film of the month of October. To celebrate the release of Promare, in 2019 Scotland Loves Animation held a special screening of the film at The Biscuit Factory in Edinburgh. It featured themed food and a Q&A with staff from TRIGGER, who were there to greet the audience. The Golden Partridge went to Ride Your Wave, however the Audience Award went to Weathering with You.
2021	Glasgow: 1–3 October Edinburgh: 11–17 October Sheffield: 19–21 November Nationwide (Picturehouse): 4–5 November	Sing a Bit of Harmony (International Premiere); Over the Sky (European Premiere); Digimon Adventure: Last Evolution Kizuna (UK Premiere); Fate/stay night: Heaven's Feel III. spring song (UK Premiere); Fortune Favours Lady Nikuko (UK Premiere); Knights of Sidonia: Love Woven in the Stars (UK Premiere); Looking for Magical Doremi (UK Premiere); Pompo: The Cinéphile (UK Premiere); Shirobako: The Movie (UK Premiere); Belle (Scottish Premiere); The Deer King; The End of Evangelion; Lupin III: The First; On-Gaku: Our Sound; Violet Evergarden: Eternity and the Auto Memory Doll	Due to the ongoing COVID-19 pandemic, Q&As were pre-recorded and audience numbers significantly lower due to social distancing measures taking place. Fortune Favours Lady Nikuko won the Golden Partridge and Sing a Bit of Harmony won the Audience Award. Another event called "Sheffield Loves Anime" took place in Sheffield between 19 and 21 November. Furthermore, an event called "We Love Anime" took place nationwide on 4–5 December at Picturehouse cinemas. The event was scheduled to be held in Showcase cinemas as well, but this never happened.
2022	Glasgow: 21–23 October Edinburgh: 24–30 October Sheffield: 18–20 November	Garden of Remembrance (World Premiere); Blue Thermal (European Premiere); Break of Dawn (European Premiere); Hula Fulla Dance (European Premiere); Re:cycle of the Penguindrum – Film 1 (European Premiere); The Tunnel to Summer, the Exit of Goodbyes (European Premiere); Evangelion: 3.0+1.0 Thrice Upon a Time (UK Premiere); Eureka Seven Hi-Evolution: Eureka; Goodbye, Don Glees!; Her Blue Sky; Inu-Oh; Mobile Suit Gundam: Cucuruz Doan's Island; Patlabor: The Movie; Perfect Blue; Serial Experiments Lain (Episodes 1–3); Seven Days War; Summer Wars	The line-up was announced on 16 September 2022. The festival had its first ever external curator this year, as Kambole Campbell programmed the Monday-Thursday films at the Edinburgh Filmhouse. In Glasgow, Inu-Oh was followed by a Q&A with Masaaki Yuasa, and in Edinburgh, Garden of Remembrance was followed by a Q&A with director Naoko Yamada and producer Eunyoung Choi. Following the collapse of the Centre for the Moving Image on 6 October 2022, all screenings at the Edinburgh Filmhouse were cancelled. The festival was moved to The Cameo, Edinburgh. Goodbye, Don Glees! won both the Golden Partridge and Audience Award. "Sheffield Loves Anime" took place between 18 and 20 November.
2023	Glasgow: 3–5 November Edinburgh: 6–12 November	Komada – A Whisky Family (European Premiere); Blue Giant (European Premiere); PHOENIX: Reminiscence of Flower (European Premiere); The Concierge (European Premiere); Galaxy Express 999 (UK 4K Premiere); Lonely Castle in the Mirror (UK Premiere); Gold Kingdom and Water Kingdom (UK Premiere); Osamu Tezuka's Metropolis; Paprika; Cowboy Bebop: The Movie (35mm); Ghost in the Shell: Innocence; Summer Ghost + Music Video Showcase; Tekkonkinkreet; Macross Plus; The Animatrix (35mm)	The line-up was announced on 22 September 2023. In Edinburgh, Summer Ghost was followed by a Q&A with Loundraw. The Concierge won the Golden Partridge, and Blue Giant won the Audience Award.
2024	Glasgow: 1–3 November Edinburgh: 4–10 November London: 15–17 November	A Few Moments of Cheers (European Premiere); Trapezium (European Premiere); The Birth of Kitaro: The Mystery of GeGeGe (UK Premiere); Code Geass: Roze of the Recapture (Parts 1–4, UK Premiere); Ghost Cat Anzu (UK Premiere); KURAMERUKAGARI & Short (UK Premiere); KureYukaba & Short (UK Premiere); Look Back (UK Premiere); Sand Land (UK Premiere); Totto-chan (UK Premiere); The Colors Within (Scottish Premiere); Lupin III: The Castle of Cagliostro (4K); Promare; Suzume & The Scent of Love	The line-up was announced on 17 September 2024. In Glasgow, Naoko Yamada and Kensuke Ushio were present for a Q&A after The Colors Within. In Edinburgh, Maho Takagi was present for a Q&A after her short film, The Scent of Love. In London, Shinnosuke Yakuwa was present for Totto-chan. Totto-chan won the Golden Partridge and The Colors Within won the Audience Award.
2025	Glasgow: 31 October – 2 November Edinburgh: 10–16 November London: 7–9 November	100 Metres (UK Premiere); All You Need Is Kill (UK Premiere); Amazing Nuts (UK Premiere); Gridman Universe (UK Premiere); Junk World (UK Premiere); The Last Blossom (UK Premiere); Labyrinth (UK Premiere); LUPIN THE IIIRD THE MOVIE: The Immortal Bloodline (UK Premiere); Angel's Egg; ChaO; Escaflowne the Movie; Golgo 13: The Professional; Lupin the IIIrd OVA Trilogy; Mobile Suit Gundam: Char's Counter Attack; Mobile Suit Gundam Wing: Endless Waltz (4K); Project A-Ko; Promare; Redline; Vampire Hunter D: Bloodlust (4K); You're Under Arrest the Movie	The line-up was announced on 10 September 2025. In Glasgow, Takeshi Koike was present for a Q&A after Lupin and Redline. In London, Kenichiro Akimoto was present for All You Need is Kill. For both London and Edinburgh, Yasuhiro Aoki was present for ChaO. Baku Kinoshita was present for The Last Blossom in Edinburgh. The Last Blossom won both the Golden Partridge and Audience Award.
2026	Glasgow: 6 November - 8 November London: 13 - 15 November Edinburgh: 16 - 22 November	The Obsessed (UK Premiere); To You in the Beyond (UK Premiere); Grotesqqque (Scottish Premiere); Ninja Scroll (4K restoration); A Silent Voice (10th anniversary screening); Ghost (UK Premiere); A New Dawn (UK Premiere); Samurai Ballerina (UK Premiere); Cocoon + bonus documentary (UK Premiere); We Are Aliens (UK Premiere); Poupelle of Chimney Town; Chimney Town: Frozen in Time; Shiranui; The Keeper of the Camphor Tree; Your Name (10th anniversary screening)	The Glasgow line-up was announced on 7th October 2026, with ticket sales for screenings at the Glasgow Film Theatre going live that same day. The Edinburgh line-up and ticket sales at The Cameo went live on the 12th October 2026. The Edinburgh screening of Shiranui is set to feature a Q&A with director Ryo Katanosaka.

==== 2020 festival ====
Due to the 2020 Coronavirus Pandemic, the 2020 Scotland Loves Anime festival was held online. A small number of physical screenings were scheduled to be held, but they were all ultimately cancelled. The online part of the film festival was held in partnership with Screen Anime, a streaming service set up by Anime Limited earlier in the year. The online portion of the festival was held between 25 October 2020 and 25 November 2020. Two-thirds of the funds raised from the online festival were donated to the Glasgow Film Theatre and Edinburgh Filmhouse.

The films that screened as part of Scotland Loves Anime on Screen Anime were:

- Love Live! Sunshine!! The School Idol Movie: Over the Rainbow
- Love Live! The School Idol Movie
- Lupin III vs. Detective Conan: The Movie
- Lupin III: The Secret of Mamo
- Lupin III: The Woman Called Fujiko Mine (TV Series)
- Lupin III: The Woman Called Fujiko Mine – Fujiko's Lie
- Lupin III: The Woman Called Fujiko Mine – Goemon's Blood Spray
- Lupin III: The Woman Called Fujiko Mine – Jigen's Gravestone
- Patema Inverted
- Penguin Highway
- Production I.G Short Film Collection
- Weathering with You (featuring a commentary by Jonathan Clements)

The digital festival also featured two in progress films, Inu-Oh (Science SARU) and Josee, the Tiger and the Fish (Bones).

The physical festival was scheduled to be run on 7–8 November in Edinburgh and Aberdeen and 14–15 November in Glasgow, but these screenings were cancelled due to the tightening of Coronavirus restrictions throughout the UK. Lupin III: The First and On-Gaku: Our Sound were scheduled to be screened at these cinemas
