= Ray Milne =

Scottish cinephile, translator and schoolteacher

- Born: Ray Mundell; 12 February 1914; Broxburn, Scotland
- Died: 28 May 2007; Edinburgh, Scotland
- Education: University of Edinburgh, Philipps University Marburg
- Occupations: Cinephile, Translator, Schoolteacher
- Spouse: Harry Milne (m. 1940)
- Children: 3

Ray Milne (née Mundell; 12 February 1914 - 28 May 2007) was a Scottish cinephile, translator and schoolteacher. In the 1960s, she was instrumental in rejuvenating the Edinburgh International Film Festival.

== Early life and education ==
Milne attended Broxburn High School and studied French at the University of Edinburgh. She completed a doctorate at the Philipps University of Marburg in 1938 with a thesis on humour in the work of J. M. Barrie and returned thereafter to Moray House in Edinburgh as a student teacher.

== Working life ==
During the Second World War, Milne, who was fluent in German and French, worked as a translator for British intelligence, most probably for the SIS in St. Albans.

In the immediate post-war period Milne worked as a teacher in Klagenfurt, Austria. After her return to Edinburgh, she taught French and German at a variety of schools, including Norton Park Secondary School, Bathgate Academy, Portobello High School and, at the end of her career, George Heriot's School. She remained a learner as well as a teacher of languages, taking up Russian and, at the end of her career, Italian.

== Involvement in Film: The Edinburgh Film Festival ==
Milne was a leading member of the Edinburgh Film Guild, which started the Edinburgh Film Festival in 1947. In the mid-1960s Milne's contacts, built up since her time in Germany in the 1930s, were crucial in re-establishing the relevance of the Festival in world cinema. Milne, for example, introduced the Festival's leadership to Stanley Forman, the UK distributor of Russian and Eastern European films, and established contact and a Scottish presence on the jury of the Mannheim Film Festival through her friend, the director Walter Talmon-Gros. This encounter brought the films of Jean-Marie Straub, Danièle Huillet, Wim Wenders and Rainer Fassbinder to Edinburgh. Her knowledge of early German cinema was a great help to the Douglas Sirk retrospective, held in 1971, when, for the first time, pre-war films such as Schlussakord (1936) were shown together with later Hollywood melodramas, such as Sirk's Magnificent Obsession (1954). When a reconstructed German version of the long banned Mädchen in Uniform (1931) was first shown at the Edinburgh Festival, Milne gave a moving, impromptu, simultaneous translation in front of the screen.

Milne was the Honorary Secretary of the Federation of Scottish Film Societies. and was involved in the Centre for the Moving Image and the Edinburgh Film Festival Council.

== Personal life ==
Milne married Harry Milne, a classics and later Russian teacher, on 25 December 1940. The couple had two daughters and a son. Harry Milne, listed as Principal Teacher of Russian at Leith Academy and James Gillespie's High School, was awarded an MBE in the 1970 New Year's Honours List. The Milnes, particularly through Ray's involvement with film and Harry's role as a key figure in the Scottish branch of the GB-USSR Association, were often hosts, particularly during the Edinburgh Festival, to visiting European film-makers and journalists.
