= Craigiebuckler =

Area of Aberdeen, Scotland

Coordinates: 57°8′14″N 2°9′36″W

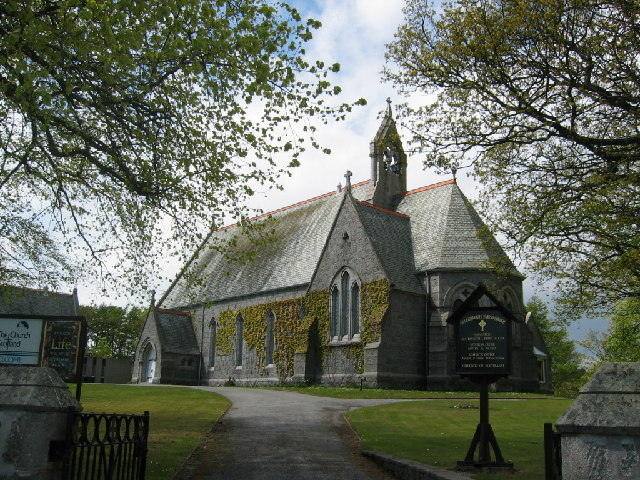
- Craigiebuckler Church

- Location within the Aberdeen City council area Location within Scotland
- Council area: Aberdeen City
- Lieutenancy area: Aberdeen
- Country: Scotland
- Sovereign state: United Kingdom
- Post town: ABERDEEN
- Postcode district: AB15
- Police: Scotland
- Fire: Scottish
- Ambulance: Scottish

Craigiebuckler is a residential area of Aberdeen, Scotland.

It is around 2 miles south west of the city centre. The local schools are Hazlehead Primary School and Hazlehead Academy.

Craigiebuckler church was designed by the Aberdeen architect Robert Gordon Wilson in 1873 and remodelled by James Matthews in 1882.
