= The Academy Shopping Centre =

Coordinates: 57°8′51″N 2°6′04″W

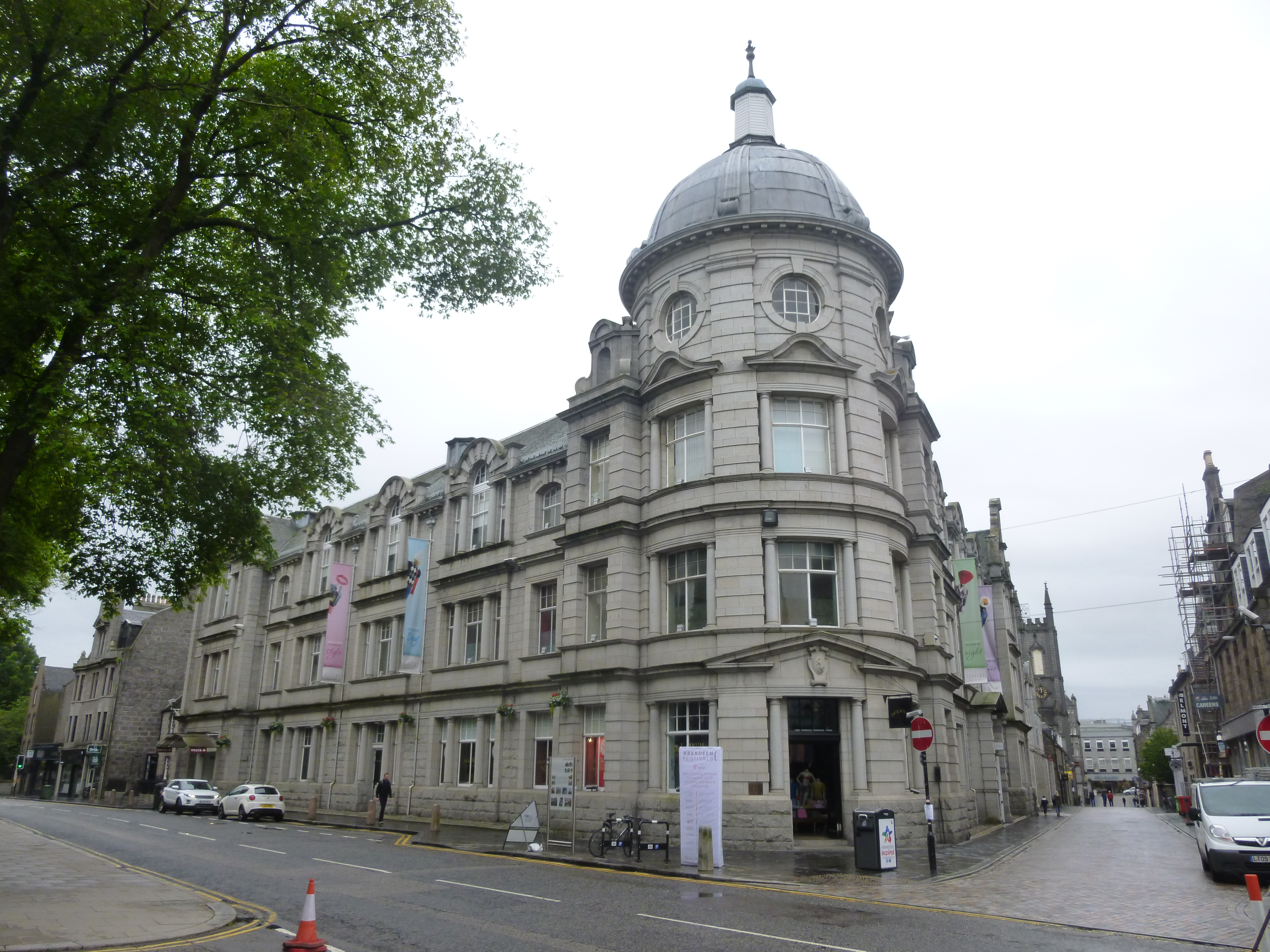
- Exterior of the shopping centre
- Location: Aberdeen, Scotland
- Opened: November 1999
- Owner: Royal London Mutual Insurance Society Ltd
- Num. of stores: 11
- Floors: 2
- Parking: None
- Website: The Academy (Archive)

Listed Building – Category B
- Official name: Former Aberdeen Academy building
- Designated: 12 January 1967
- Reference no.: LB20081

The Academy Aberdeen, previously known as "The Academy Shopping Centre", is located on the corner of Belmont Street and Schoolhill in the main shopping district of Aberdeen, Scotland. As the name suggests, it is a former Victorian secondary school renovated into a modern shopping centre.

The central courtyard of the centre has hosted many events such as fashion shows, dance displays, comedy shows, car displays and live music performances. It is now used for al fresco dining.

== History ==
The shopping centre building was constructed as the Central Senior Secondary School. The school opened in 1905 and catered for around 1,000 pupils aged from 12 to 15 years. In 1954 the school became selective by restricting admission to children who had passed the 11-plus examination; it was renamed Aberdeen Academy. The Academy closed in 1969 and pupils were transferred to Hazlehead Academy on the eastern outskirts of Aberdeen. The shopping centre opened in 1998.

== Architecture ==
The building containing the shopping centre dates to 1901 and was built in the Renaissance style. The building was designed by John Alexander Ogg Allan, the official architect to the Aberdeen School Board. The building is Category B listed. W A Brogden in Aberdeen: An Illustrated Guide describes the building as "full of imperial vigour".

== See also ==
- Retail in Aberdeen
- Bon Accord Centre
- Trinity Centre, Aberdeen
- Union Square Aberdeen
