= The Ceremony (2024 film) =

2024 film by Jack King

- Directed by: Jack King
- Story by: Jack King
- Produced by: Hollie Bryan
- Release date: August 2024 (Edinburgh)
- Running time: 91 minutes
- Country: England
- Language: English; Romanian; Arabic; Kurdish
- Budget: £120,000

The Ceremony is a 2024 British drama film written and directed by Jack King. The film was filmed and set in Bradford and the Yorkshire Dales, and involves migrant workers attempting to dispose of a body in the hills of North Yorkshire. The film won the Sean Connery Award for Feature Filmmaking Excellence at the 2024 Edinburgh International Film Festival.

== Plot ==
Several migrants workers are employed in a car wash in Bradford, West Yorkshire. They are a mixture of Romanian, Arabic, Kurdish and Turkish immigrants who have trouble understanding each other because of culture and language. A customer accuses one of the workers of stealing his Rolex watch from the glove compartment which leads to a death of one of the workers. Not wishing to get the police involved, the boss orders two of the other workers to take the body into the hills and bury it.

== Cast ==
- Tudor Cucu-Dumitrescu
- Erdal Yildiz
- Mo'min Swaitat
- Liam Thomas
- Catalin Vasile as Jozef

== Production ==
The film was shot over twelve "frigid" days in January 2023 in Yorkshire; Bradford for the car wash scenes, and Kettlewell in Upper Wharfedale for the Yorkshire Dales scenes. The film was co-produced as part of the Bradford UK City of Culture 2025, and was supported by National Science and Media Museum, the BFI, and the National Lottery.

== Themes and influences ==
The film explores moral ambiguity, survival, and displacement. King stated, “I’m extremely curious about displaced people and that experience and the relationship between place and identity,” noting that the script emerged from real encounters with migrant workers near his home in Yorkshire.

King has also emphasized the film’s focus on ethical compromise and human resilience: “It made me wonder about what people have to give up morally in order to survive… That moment clarified something for me about what the film would be… It was about survival, and the battle to hold on to a sense of morality and self in a system that strips away your identity and dignity.”

== Critical reception ==
Sam Cooney, writing in the RAF News, gave the film four roundels out of five and said that the film is "beautifully photographed in striking black-and-white, and punctuated with numerous (perhaps too many) close-up detail shots, the film mixes a grounded realism with moments that tip into the surreal." Cath Clarke writing in the Guardian awarded the film three stars out of five, and also highlighted the film's tonal quality; "In the stark monochrome photography, the landscape is menacing and hostile. The camera often lingers on the men’s faces, like portrait photography... there’s one dream sequence too many and far too much screen time given to a ram, as magnificent as he is. It’s a slightly unsatisfactory conclusion to an impressive film."

Yvette Huddleston for the Yorkshire Post gave the film four stars out of five saying that "...Jack King's debut feature is a powerful and moving story that lingers long in the memory." She also praised the two male leads (Cucu-Dumetriscu and Yildiz) stating that both actors gave "outstanding, beautifully nuanced performances."

== Accolades ==
The film won the inaugural Sean Connery Prize for Feature Filmmaking Excellence at the Edinburgh International Film Festival 2024. The director was given a prize of £50,000. The film also received two nominations at the British Independent Film Awards in 2024.
