= Hazlehead Academy =

Coordinates: 57°8′37″N 2°10′38″W

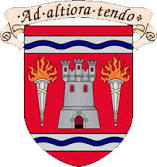

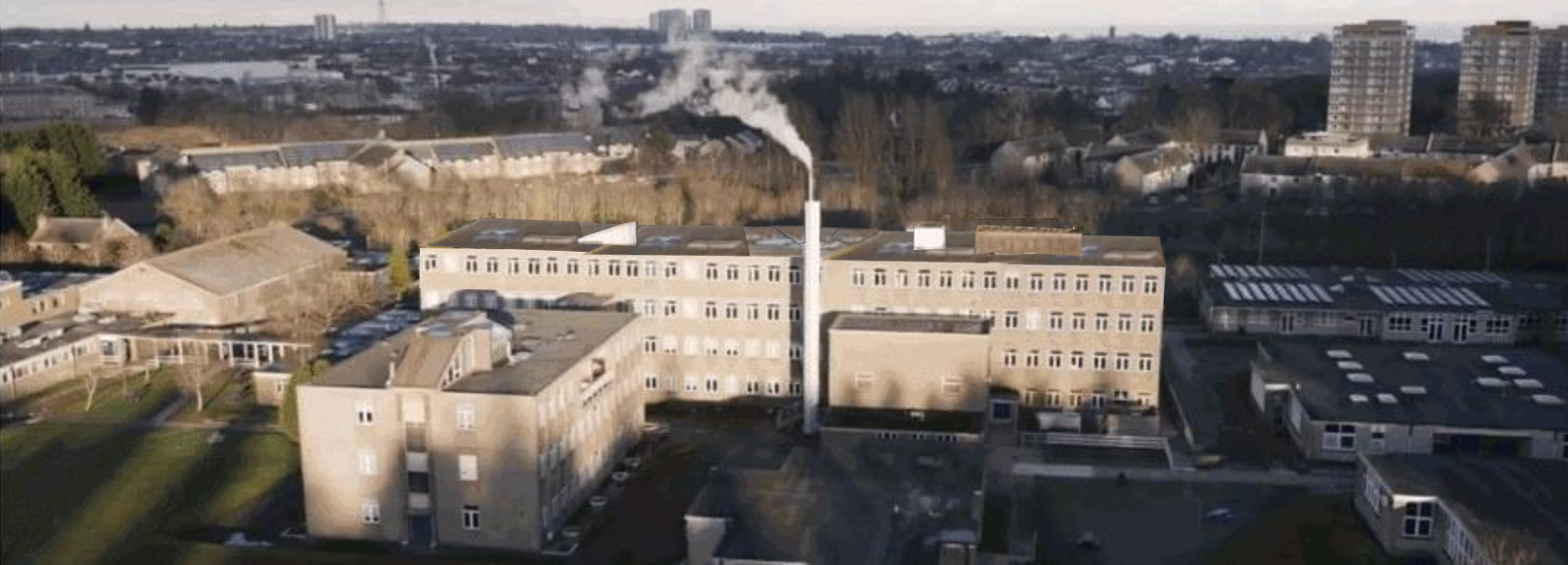
- The school in 2024

Location
- Groats Road; Hazlehead, Aberdeen, AB15 8BE; Scotland

Information
- School type: State Secondary School
- Motto: Ad altiora tendo (I strive towards higher things)
- Established: 1970
- Local authority: Aberdeen City Council
- Head teacher: Jim Purdie
- Staff: 80
- Years taught: S1─S6
- Sex: Co-educational
- Age: 11 to 18
- Enrolment: 1100
- Average class size: 30
- Education system: Education Scotland
- Classrooms: 68
- Houses: Bruce, Craigievar, Dunecht, Greyfriars, Marischal
- Colours: Bottle green and navy blue
- National ranking: 155 of 340
- Opened by: Elizabeth II
- Website: sites.google.com/ab-ed.org/hazleheadacademy

Hazlehead Academy (Scottish Gaelic: Àrd-Sgoil Cheann Challtain), formerly known as Central School then Aberdeen Academy, is a comprehensive secondary school in Aberdeen, Scotland. It has five main feeder primary schools, Airyhall Primary School, Fernielea Primary School, Hazlehead Primary School, Kingsford Primary School and Countesswells Primary School – in addition to this, pupils who have been part of a Gaelic unit at Aberdeen's Gilcomstoun Primary School can transfer to the school, which offers Gaelic as part of the curriculum.

== History ==
Hazlehead Academy is a six-year comprehensive school on the western edges of Aberdeen, adjacent to Hazlehead Park. It has a history stretching back for over 100 years. In 1901, Aberdeen School Board built Central School on the corner of Schoolhill and Belmont Street, on a site now occupied by a shopping centre named The Academy. In 1954, the school was renamed Aberdeen Academy. When the school closed, the pupils were moved to the new Hazlehead Academy.

Hazlehead Academy was officially opened by Queen Elizabeth II on 7 October 1970. Plans were laid towards the end of the 1950s. The education committee at the time had under consideration the reorganisation of the existing Secondary provision of 3 Senior Secondary schools and a number of Junior Secondary schools into 10 co-educational comprehensives. Hazlehead Academy would become one of these senior secondaries and then a comprehensive school.

The current head teacher is Jim Purdie who took up post in August 2016. The school roll is around 1,100 pupils.

In 2012, the school was selected as the Aberdeen base for the Scottish Football Association's Performance Schools, a system devised to support the development of the best young talented footballers across the country. There are seven such schools across Scotland.

== Notable former pupils ==
- Stuart Armstrong: professional footballer, currently playing for Southampton F.C.
- Fraser Fyvie: professional footballer, currently playing for Cove Rangers F.C.
- Lee Mair: professional footballer, notably formerly of Aberdeen F.C. and St Mirren F.C.
- Derek Rae: football commentator, currently working for BT Sport and ESPN
- David Rowson: professional footballer, notably formerly of Aberdeen F.C. and Partick Thistle F.C.
- Hugh Robertson: professional footballer, notably formerly of Ross County F.C. and Hartlepool United F.C.
- Neale Cooper: professional footballer, notably of Aberdeen F.C. and former manager of Hartlepool United F.C.
- Rachel Corsie: professional footballer, currently playing for Utah Royals FC and Scotland women's national football team
- Laura Main: singer and actress. Star of BBC One's drama Call the Midwife
- Richie Ramsay: professional golfer and former champion of U.S. Amateur
- Al Carns: British Labour MP and former regular Royal Marines officer
