= Edinburgh International Film Festival =

Film festival in Scotland

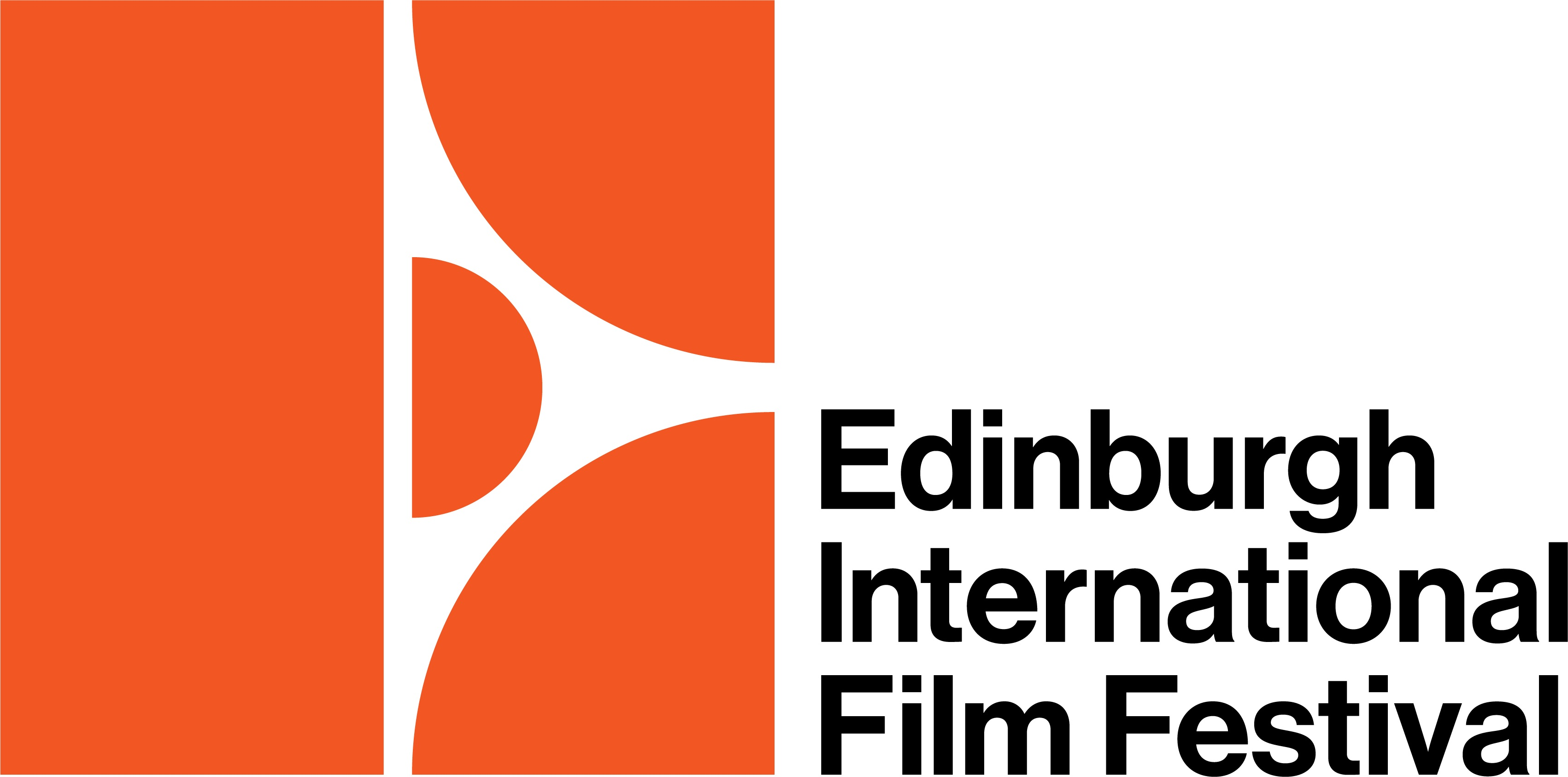
- Status: Active
- Genre: Film festival
- Date: 13 – 19 August 2026
- Frequency: Annually
- Venue: Summerhall; The Cameo, Edinburgh; Edinburgh Filmhouse
- Location: Edinburgh
- Country: Scotland
- Years active: 79
- Inaugurated: 1 June 1947
- Most recent: 2026
- Previous event: 78th
- Next event: 80th
- Website: edfilmfest.org
- 79th

The Edinburgh International Film Festival (EIFF), established in 1947, is the world's oldest continually running film festival.

EIFF presents both UK and international films (all titles are World, international, European or UK Premieres), in all genres and lengths. It also presents themed retrospectives and other specialized programming strands.

== History ==
=== Early years ===
The Edinburgh International Film Festival (EIFF) originated as the International Festival of Documentary Films and was opened by John Grierson, founder of the British documentary movement. The International Festival of Documentary Films was presented by the Edinburgh Film Guild alongside the 1947 Edinburgh International Festival. Key figures in this initiative were the Guild's Norman Wilson and the film journalist and wartime civil servant, Forsyth Hardy. The second Festival, in 1948, opened with Robert J. Flaherty's Louisiana Story. In 1949, The Festival planned to screen the double Academy Award winner Bicycle Thieves as the highlight of the third Festival but the film was given UK distribution and the distributors pulled it from the Festival.

1952 marked a shift from documentary programming and the festival included Le Plaisir and Death of a Salesman, and the Duke of Edinburgh attended the opening of this sixth Festival. The Festival was expanded in 1954 and showcased films and events at the Cameo cinema and other cinemas around Edinburgh, and John Huston also agreed to serve as Honorary President.

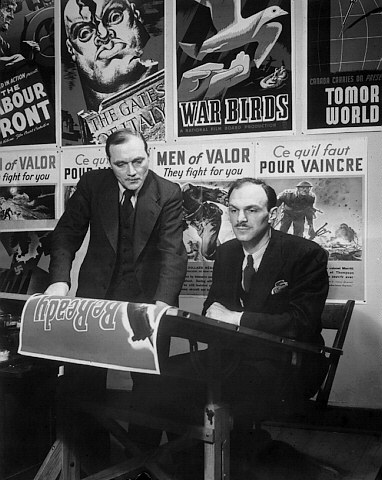
John Grierson, founder of the British documentary movement. Opened the International Festival of Documentary Films, now the EIFF

=== 1960s and 1970s ===
The late Sixties saw Hollywood films showcased, mainly from independent studios, for example AIP. Film critic John Russell, reviewed these changes for the The Times and wrote:

Last year the Edinburgh Film Festival was radically remade: out with drably conservative features and solid documentary, in with Roger Corman, international underground and the young idea. The idea was not only young, but good. By choosing to lay the festival's main accent on specialist weeks devoted to a particular country or school and on retrospectives of the sort of film-maker rarely so honoured over here, the organizers immediately gave it a new twist, and removed it from the regular rat race, in which too many festivals chase too few films of any real merit

— John Taylor Russell, Edinburgh Goes Pop, The Times (23 August 1969)

Director Murray Grigor recruited two undergraduates at University of Edinburgh, Lynda Myles and David Will, who had written an article published in The Scotsman criticising the Festival's programming as conservative. Wills and Myles were credited bringing influence from French film theory and American cinema. They worked with British theorist and filmmaker Peter Wollen and introduced film retrospectives, educational and publishing events to the festival. Peter Stanfield writes that this changed the festival saying "as of 1968-69 the Festival was no longer a purveyor of middlebrow film fare; from the onwards it would assume an innovative, oppositional face, offering a platform for cultish directors and a window for some of the most exciting developments in international filmmaking." The EIFF was funded by grants from the Scottish Film Council and Edinburgh Cooperation and, at the time, had no industry sponsorship.

In 1970 the Festival continued to show international films from Eastern and Western Europe including The Rain People and Five Easy Pieces. Cult films were also screened including the work of Monte Hellman, whose work the EIFF called "self-conscious" and "schematic" in the 1970 programme. In 1975, the EIFF showcased the work of Jonathan Demme, screening The Hot Box, Caged Heat and Crazy Mama because "Demme sought to subvert the traditional conservative values of the genre! (written in the EIFF 1975 programme). However, the decision of the EIFF to screen exploitation films was met with criticism and local magistrates responsible for passing films as suitable for public screening took offence to the violence in Bloody Mama, for example, and allowed it only one screening.

The EIFF, under the guidance of Lynda Myles, Laura Mulvey and Claire Johnston, championed the screening of female directors and was the first of its kind in Europe to screen a variety of different films showcasing the lives, histories and work of women. This was known as "The Women's Event" organised by Myles, Johnston and Mulvey at the 1972 Festival.

In 1977 the EIFF founded the Edinburgh International Television Festival as a five-day event including the MacTaggart Memorial Lecture presented by Max Ophuls.

=== 1980s ===
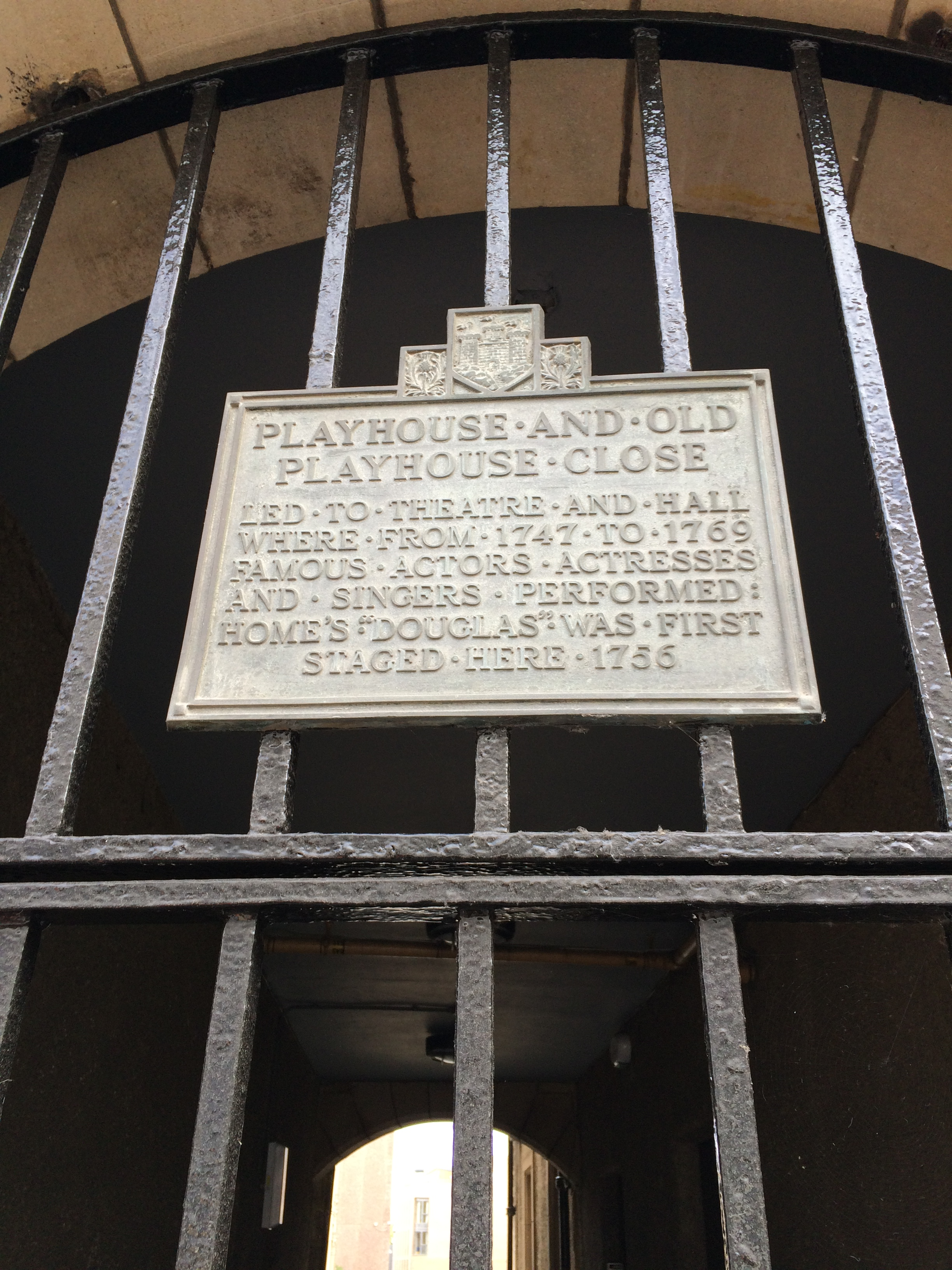
Edinburgh Playhouse

Director Jim Hickey took over the Festival in 1981 and inherited a financial deficit, meaning his budget was £31,000 instead of the £75,000 the previous year, and the 1981 Festival was to run for nine days instead of a fortnight. Hickey decided that he would screen Abel Gance's five-hour long film Napoléon, and this was shown as the 1981 Festival's closing performance to drum up interest and publicity.

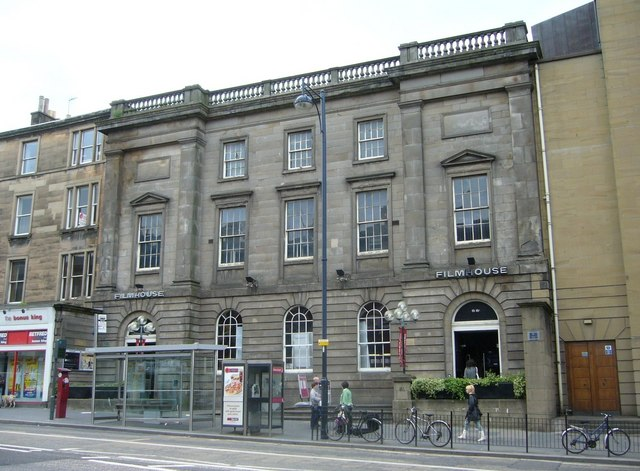
Edinburgh Filmhouse

The Edinburgh Filmhouse was under reconstruction and when opened, the main auditorium would make a 285 seating capacity venue available for the EIFF. On 15 February 1982, the main auditorium was opened to the public. The Filmhouse and the EIFF were financially linked for administration purposes, and the Scottish Film Council said it could not bail out the Filmhouse and that other sources of financial aid would need to be found.

The 1982 Festival opening film was E.T. The Extra Terrestrial screening at the Playhouse. The first week of this Festival also included the Scotch Reels event in which there were discussions and screenings of Scottish films, and the programmes were selected by Colin McArthur, who also convened the organising group. This event, discussing Scottish film, continued at the 1983 Festival but was renamed New Images of Scotland.

The 1984 Festival opened with the premiere of the film Comfort and Joy screened at The Playhouse. The EIFF executive was now made up of Professor Colin Young as Chairman, Murray Grigor as Vice-Chair, Film, Jane Cousins, Vice-Chair, Television, and others. Jim Hickey remained Director of the Festival, as well as director of the Filmhouse. Financial negotiations for the Filmhouse development were ongoing and the Duke of Edinburgh agreed to open the completed Filmhouse in July 1985.

The 1986 Festival marked the EIFF's 40th anniversary and the Scottish Television produced a film Hooray for Holyrood which included archival footage and interviews from those who had been associated with the EIFF. The main event at this Festival was a three-day conference on Cultural Theories and Practices associated with the Notion of a Third World Cinema, organised in association with the British Film Institute.

In 1988, the financial situation regarding the co-administration of the EIFF and the Filmhouse was ongoing and an outcome was eventually reached. The two bodies would separate by the end of the year but each would share the debt of both organisations. Being separate organisations required separate administration and therefore different directors. Jim Hickey was made Chairman of the Filmhouse, John Crichton remained Director of the Filmhouse. David Robinson was appointed Director of the EIFF, and Colin Young remained the Festival's chairman. Robinson explained, in an interview with The Times, that his aim was "the promotion of young film-makers and new talents." In a change with tradition, Robinson hosted prizes and competitions including the Charles Chaplin New Directors Award and the Young Film-maker of the Year prize offered by the BBC and Virgin at the 1989 Festival.

=== 1990–2020 ===
Robinson introduced two new awards for the 1990 Festival; a prize for the best animated film financed by the Post Office and the Michael Powell Prize for the best British film of the year sponsored by BAFTA/Shell. There was also a return to hosting a Celebrity Lecture, which has been initiated by Orson Welles in 1953, and David Puttnam spoke at the Cameo.

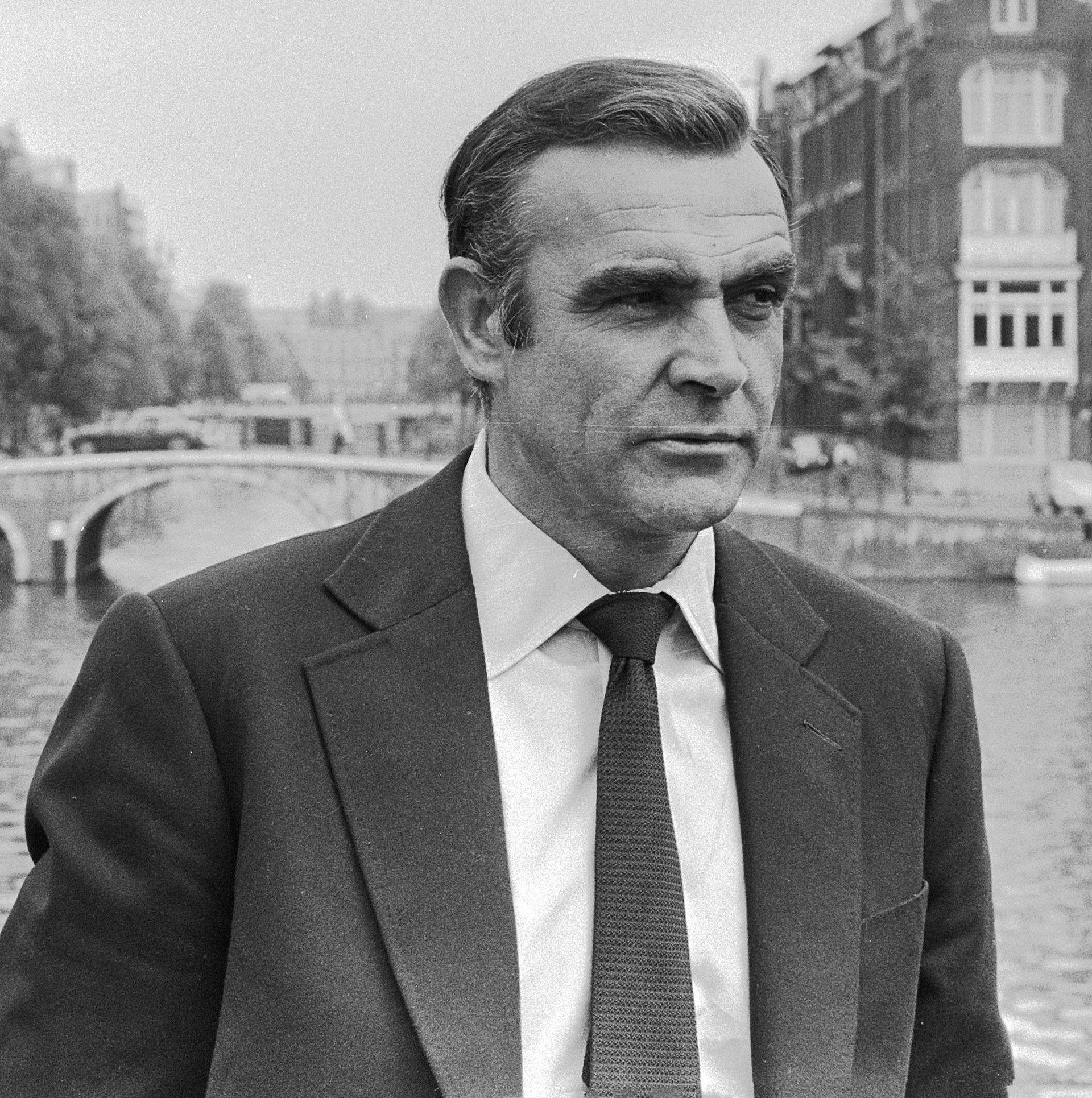
Sean Connery; former Patron of the EIFF

At the 1991 Festival it was announced that Sean Connery would become Patron of the EIFF and he attended the closing performance of that year's Festival with his wife at the Cameo. Changes to the EIFF's administration were also made, including Murray Grigor becoming chairman of the festival, succeeding Colin Young who became chairman of the Edinburgh International Film and Television Festivals Council.

In the spring of 1992, Penny Thompson took on the role of Director of the EIFF and she stated in an interview that her aim was to combine "a bit of analysis with a bit of fun." Thompson introduced a new award for European Script Writing.

The artistic director from September 2006 to 2010 was Hannah McGill, previously a film critic and cinema columnist for The Herald newspaper. Her predecessor, Shane Danielsen, served from 2002 to 2006. Tilda Swinton, Robert Carlyle and Seamus McGarvey were honorary patrons. In December 2009, Hannah McGill collected the prestigious Talkback Thames New Talent Award at the Women in Film and Television Awards.

The 60th Festival in 2006 saw American actress Sigourney Weaver attend and receive the first EIFF Diamond Award for outstanding contribution to world cinema. In 2010, Patrick Stewart chaired the Michael Powell Award Jury and attended an In Person: BAFTA Scotland interview.

Following McGill's departure, a new format was announced in December 2010 with no artistic director and a series of guest curators led by producer James Mullighan. The Festival returned to a more conventional format in 2012 under artistic director Chris Fujiwara, who stepped down in 2014.

In 2014, the film critic/programmer Mark Adams – who had been Chief Film Critic for Screen International; Director of Cinema at the Institute of Contemporary Arts (ICA), and Head of Programme Planning at the National Film Theatre – took over as artistic director. He decided to step down in late 2019 after heading five editions.

=== 2020–2025 ===
==== 2020 ====
- Due to the COVID-19 pandemic, the 2020 Festival was cancelled. Instead, an EdFilmFest At Home collaboration between EIFF and Curzon Home Cinema ran from 24 June to 5 July, featuring live Q&As with some of the filmmakers.

==== 2021 ====
- On 22 June, Scotland's Centre for the Moving Image (CMI) announced the appointment of Kirsty Matheson as EIFF's new Creative Director. Matheson had previously served as Director of Film at Australia's national museum of screen culture, prior to which she worked at Brisbane International Film Festival, Sydney Film Festival and Dendy Films. Matheson joined CMI following the delivery of EIFF 2021, and helped lead and deliver the 75th anniversary edition of EIFF in 2022.
- The 2021 EIFF took place from 18 to 25 August. Adjusting to a post-pandemic world, the festival took a hybrid approach, offering in-person screenings in Edinburgh and other partner venues across Scotland, alongside at-home screenings through a dedicated streaming platform. Film Fest in The City was amongst the Festival's programme, offering free open-air screenings in St Andrew Square.

2022

- EIFF returned to a fully in-person model in 2022, running from 12 to 20 August. Under the new direction of Kirsty Matheson, EIFF reimagined its major award, The Michael Powell Award for Best British Feature with a renewed commitment to internationalism by presenting The Powell & Pressburger Award for Best Feature Film.
- In October 2022, EIFF's organiser, the Centre for the Moving Image (CMI) went into administration. This also led to the sudden closure of the Festival's main venue, Edinburgh's celebrated Filmhouse cinema. CMI released a statement explaining that: "The charity is facing the perfect storm of sharply rising costs, in particular energy costs, alongside reduced trade due to the ongoing impacts of the pandemic and the cost of living crisis. The combination and scale of these challenges is unprecedented and means that there was no option but to take immediate action."

==== 2023 ====
- In March 2023, it was announced that EIFF would return for a special 1-year iteration in August 2023 as part of the Edinburgh International Festival, with the support of Screen Scotland and under the Programme Director Kate Taylor, as Katy Matheson left her role as Creative Director.
- EIFF's 2023 schedule presented a compact and curated selection plus a weekend of outdoor screenings labelled Cinema Under the Stars, running from 18–23 August.
- In July 2023, Screen Scotland facilitated the recruitment of Chairperson Andrew Macdonald to lead the establishment of a new EIFF company to run the Festival. Macdonald was tasked with recruiting a board and executive team to lead the Festival's development from September 2023.

==== 2024 ====
In November 2023, Paul Ridd, a long-term acquisitions executive at Picturehouse Cinemas, was named as the new Director of the Festival. Shortly after, Emma Boa was appointed as the Festival's Producer. With revitalised leadership, the EIFF team worked to embed the Festival within the wider cultural offering taking place in Edinburgh in August.

In January 2024, it was announced the EIFF would relaunch as an August fixture, running from 15 to 21 August. This attracted the Fringe audiences and integrated the Festival into the larger arts landscape accessible during this month.

The 77th anniversary of EIFF had a particular focus on industry, delivering a series of panels and networking opportunities that created a hub for local industry to network with international executives and directors. With the support of The Sean Connery Foundation, the Festival launched its inaugural World Premiere features competition, a programme of ten brand new films from all over the world competing for a £50,000 cash prize, decided by audience vote. The Ceremony, a UK debut directed by Jack King, won the award and recouped much of the film's budget.

EIFF also launched a new Shorts Competition, named in honour of Thelma Schoonmaker, which awarded £15,000 to the makers of Manny Wolfe, including the film's director, Trevor Neuhoff. 37 new feature films, 18 World Premieres including 10 World Premieres competed for the new Sean Connery Prize for Feature Filmmaking Excellence, 4 special retrospective screenings, 5 short film programmes including the new Thelma Schoonmaker Prize for Short Filmmaking Excellence competition, an In Conversation event with filmmaker Gaspar Noé and a strand of thrilling Midnight Madness screenings made up a seven-day celebration of world-class new cinema which allowed audiences, press and industry to engage with Edinburgh's other arts and cultural Festivals. EIFF initiated new collaborations and partnerships with the Edinburgh Festival Fringe, opening up the Film Festival programme in new venues across the city, including non-traditional cinema spaces in Summerhall, 50 George Square and Inspace. This allowed audiences to experience the Fringe along with the programme of cinema at EIFF.

==== 2025 ====
The 78th Edinburgh International Film Festival (EIFF 2025) took place from 14 to 20 August, presenting a seven-day programme focused on international cinema and film industry engagement.

EIFF 2025 included 194 screenings and 34 industry and panel events, attended by over 300 filmmakers, producers and distributors, as well as more than 16,500 audience members. The programme featured 43 new feature films, including 18 World Premieres. Ten of these competed for The Sean Connery Prize for Feature Filmmaking Excellence, which was awarded to Abdolreza Kahani's Mortician. Six short film programmes were also presented, with Mother Goose by Joanna Vymeris receiving The Thelma Schoonmaker Prize for Short Filmmaking Excellence.

The festival's retrospectives included Sacred Bonds, featuring the six original James Bond films starring Sean Connery and introduced by members of the Connery family and guest speakers, and The Ranown Cycle by Budd Boetticher, shown in partnership with the Edinburgh Film Guild. Other retrospective screenings featured introductions by Andrea Arnold, Kevin Macdonald, Nia DaCosta and David Hayman.

A series of In Conversation events were held with figures from across the film industry. Participants included Thelma Schoonmaker, Ken Loach, Paul Laverty and Rebecca O'Brien, Jeremy Thomas and Mark Cousins, Eva Victor and Adele Romanski, Nia DaCosta, Ben Wheatley and Andy Starke, Andrea Arnold, and Kevin and Andrew Macdonald, in partnership with BAFTA Scotland. Sessions were hosted by Mia Bays (BFI Filmmaking Fund), Guy Lodge (Variety), Rowan Woods (Edinburgh TV Festival), Rose Matafeo, Sam Clements (90 Minutes or Less podcast) and Anthony Andrews (We Are Parable).

The Festival opened with the UK Premiere of Eva Victor's Sorry, Baby and closed with the World Premiere of Paul Sng's Reality Is Not Enough, a documentary on Irvine Welsh. EIFF 2025 featured 39 World Premieres and 48 UK Premieres across features and shorts, and highlighted emerging Scottish talent through the NFTS Sean Connery Talent Lab and the Scottish Documentary Institute's Bridging the Gap programme.

Films were presented from 36 countries, including Scotland, the UK, the US, Ireland, Canada, Spain, Greece, Denmark, Croatia, France, Turkey, Australia, Brazil, Japan, Iran, Argentina and South Africa.

Screenings were held at several Edinburgh venues, including the reopened Filmhouse, Cameo Cinema, Vue Omni, Monkey Barrel Comedy, and a new pop-up cinema at the National Galleries of Scotland's Hawthornden Theatre, in partnership with Assembly Festival. Tollcross Central Hall operated as the Festival Hub, hosting industry panels, networking sessions and informal meeting areas.

==== 2026 ====
The 79th Edinburgh International Film Festival (EIFF 2026) took place from 13 to 19 August. The Sean Connery Prize for Feature Filmmaking Excellence, worth £50,000, was awarded to Skintown, directed by Kieron J. Walsh, and the Thelma Schoonmaker Prize for Short Filmmaking Excellence was awarded to Grief Room, directed by Sinda Agha.

== Films ==
=== Notable screenings ===
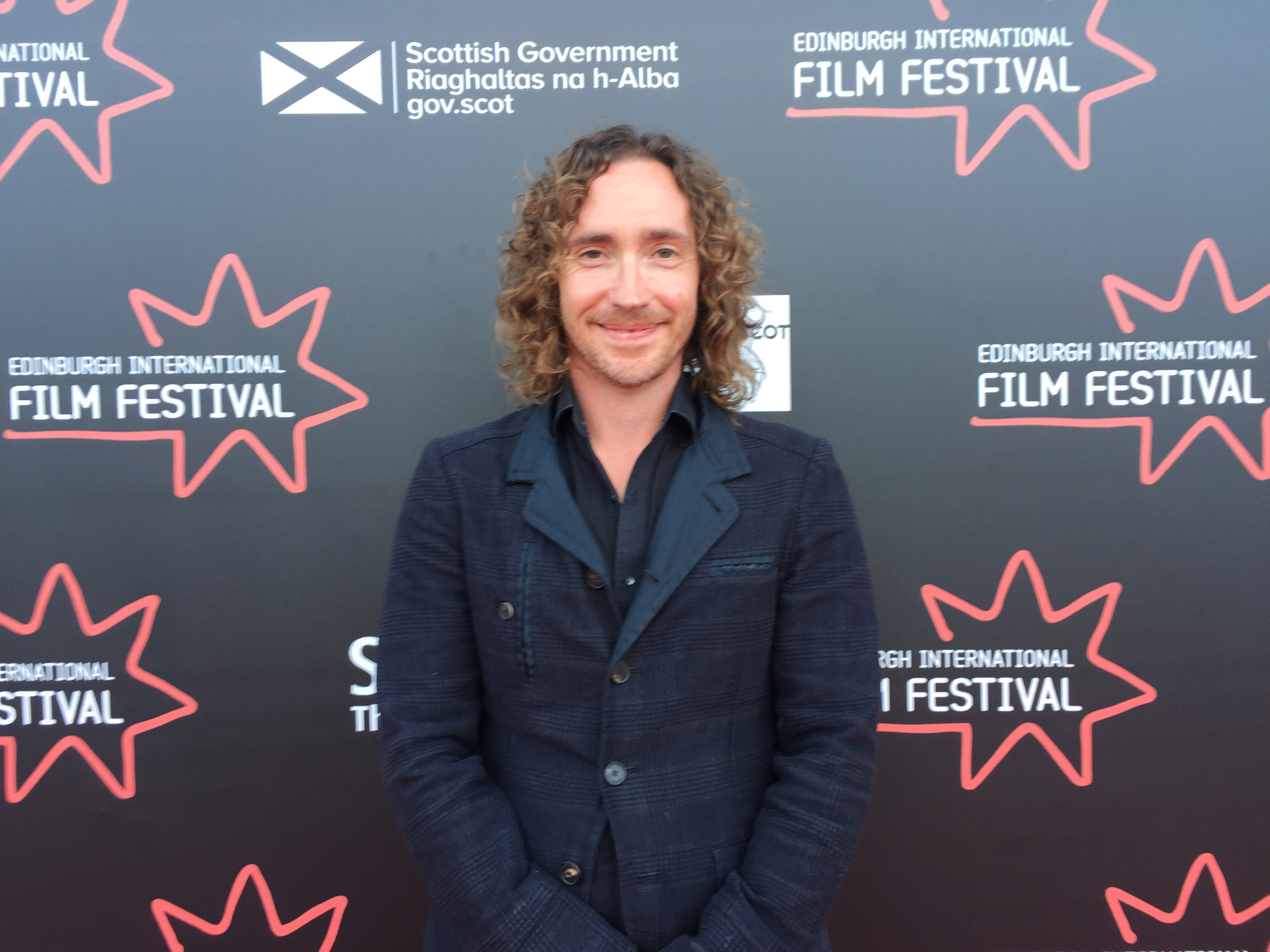
Justin Edgar at EIFF 2017, where his film The Marker premiered

The first films shown at The International Festival of Documentary Films were The Cumberland Story, The Seventh Age and The Festival of Youth. The closing film for the Festival was Roberto Rosellini's Paisa, six documentary episodes about the liberation of Italy at the end of the Second World War. The second Festival in 1948 opened with Louisiana Story. In 1949, the Festival opened with a screening of Berliner Ballade and closed with Jour de Fete. The EIFF shifted from only screening documentaries and in 1950 opened with The Wooden Horse. In 1951, the EIFF screened The Man in The White Suit as the opening film, a sci-fi comedy. Gene Kelly opened the 1956 Festival with a screening of his film Invitation to Dance, and the same Festival also introduced the work of Satyajit Ray with a screening of Pather Pancahli. The 1957 Festival introduced the first Midnight Matinee and screened A Face in the Crowd at 11.30pm at the Regal cinema. The 1958 Festival was opened with a screening of Wild Strawberries and a popular film at this Festival was Roman Polanski's Two Men and a Wardrobe. Bert Haanstra's first feature film Fanfare opened the 1959 Festival.

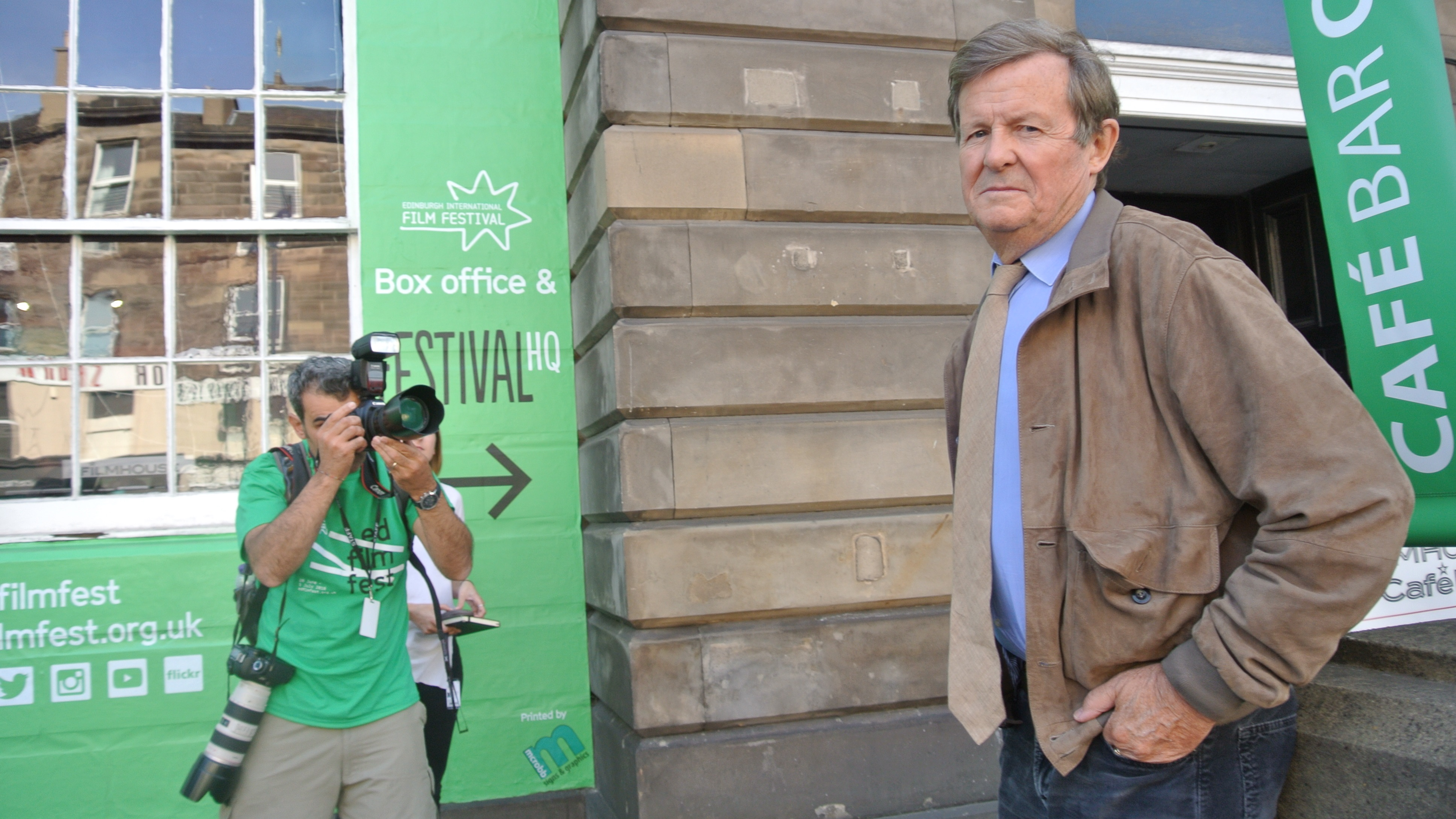
David Hare at EIFF 2018

In 1960, I Aim At the Stars was shown at the Opening Gala and the films main actors Curt Jurgens and Gia Scala attended. The Pleasure of His Company had its European Premiere at the ABC cinema on Lothian Road as part of the EIFF in 1961. The 1962 Festival celebrated literature and the theme was The Film and the Literature and featured literary adaptions including A Streetcar Named Desire, The Innocents, Last year at Marienbad, Wuthering Heights, and The Quiet American. The theme of the 1963 Festival was The Film and the Drama with a special opening screening of An Evening with the Royal Ballet. The 1964 celebrated the work of Ingmar Bergman with a Retrospective screening films including The Seventh Seal, Wild Strawberries, The Face, Virgin Spring and The Devil's Eye. The 1965 Festival screened the work of Fred Zinnemann including From Here to Eternity and The Nun's Story. The 20th EIFF in 1966 opened with the UK premiere of Dr Zhivago. The 1967 Festival celebrated the work of Carol Reed and screened films including: Odd Man Out, The Fallen Idol, The Third Man, An Outcast of the Islands, The Man Between and Our Man in Havana. The 1968 presented a Samuel Fuller Retrospective and screened the complete works of Fuller. Country Dance was screened at the 1970 Festival and its star Susannah York attended. The 1971 Festival presented a Norman McLaren Retrospective and screened films including New York Lightboard and Korean Alphabet. The 1973 Retrospective celebrated the work of Werner Herzog. The 1974 Festival screened Football as Never Before which followed George Best in close-up for the match between Manchester United and Coventry City. The 1978 Festival screened Long Shot. Director Ridley Scott attended the midnight screening of Alien at the New Victoria cinema at the 1979 Festival.

In 1980 Tess was screened as the closing film, and it was the final 70mm film to ever be screened at the Caley Picture House. The Draughtsman's Contract premiered at the 1982 Festival and Peter Greenaway and Michael Nyman attended. The 1983 Festival presented a Japanese Cinema Perspective. Streets of Fire was screened at the Filmhouse in 1984 and Walter Hill attended. The 1986 Festival screened Betty Blue at the Playhouse as the opening film and Jean-Jacques Beineix attended. Bill Forsyth arranged for a special screening of his film Housekeeping at the 1987 Festival. John Cleese attended the 1988 Festival for a screening of A Fish Called Wanda. The Cook, The Thief, His Wife and Her Lover was screened as a surprise film at the 1989 Festival, and was not revealed to the audience until they had sat down in their seats. In 1990, Clint Eastwood and Quincy Jones attended the Festival for a screening of White Hunter Black Heart. The 1991 Festival premiered Jungle Fever, Life is Sweet, Truly Madly Deeply, Boyz In The Hood and Pump Up The Volume, and Barton Fink closed the Festival. Reservoir Dogs, Glengarry Glen Ross, Man Bites Dog and Les Amants du Pont Neuf were all screened at the 1992 Festival. The Piano was screened at the opening of the 1993 Festival. The 1994 Festival premiered Shallow Grave, and Danny Boyle, Ewan McGregor, Christopher Eccleston and Kerry Fox attended. Clerks, Dazed & Confused, Killing Zoe, Muriel's Wedding and The Last of England were also screened at the Festival. The Usual Suspects premiered at the 1995 Festival. Sean Connery attended the 1996 Festival for a screening of Dragonheart at the Odeon cinema which opened the Festival. Mrs Brown premiered at the Dominion cinema for the 1997 Festival and both Billy Connolly and Judi Dench attended. The 1998 Festival premiered Fear and Loathing In Las Vegas and director Terry Gilliam attended. The Thomas Crown Affair premiered at the 1999 Festival and Pierce Brosnan and Rene Russo attended. The 2000 Festival opened with a screening of Dancer in the Dark and also premiered Beautiful Creatures, Amores Perros, Audition and Billy Elliot. The Pledge was screened at the 2001 Festival and Sean Penn attended. The 2002 Festival opened with the premiere of Morvern Callar and Samantha Morton attended. Young Adam opened the 2003 Festival. The world premiere of My Summer of Love was part of the 2004 Festival. Guy X premiered at the 2005 Festival and Alassandro Nivola, Natascha McElhone and Jason Biggs attended. Sigourney Weaver attended the 60th EIFF in 2006 and attended the premiere of her film Snow Cake. The Edge of Love premiered at the 2008 Festival and Keira Knightley and Sienna Miller attended. Robert Carlyle's directorial debut The Legend of Barney Thompson opened the 2015 Festival. Story of a Girl premiered at the 2017 Festival and Andrew Herr and Kevin Bacon attended. The International premiere of Puzzle opened the 2018 Festival and closed with the UK premiere of Swimming with Men. The European premiere of Get Duked! (originally titled Boyz in the Wood) opened the 2019 Festival and Mrs Lowry and Son premiered and closed the 2019 Festival and Timothy Spall attended. Yesterday and Astronaut were also screened and Danny Boyle and Richard Dreyfuss attended.

The 2020 EdFilmFest At Home collaboration between EIFF and Curzon Home Cinema offered a series of at-home viewings including titles such as Clemency, Saint Frances and A White, White Day.

The 2021 Festival premiered Annette, and screened a special preview of Everybody's Talking About Jamie. Pig opened the Festival and premiered Here Today as the closing film. The 75th EIFF in 2022 opened with a screening of Aftersun and closed with After Yang. The 2023 Festival opened with the World Premiere of Silent Roar and closed with Fremont. It also presented a Retrospective screening of Shane Meadows' Dead Man's Shoes.

In 2024, the new iteration of EIFF opened with the UK premiere of The Outrun starring Saoirse Ronan and the UK premiere of Alien: Romulus as a Midnight Madness screening. The Festival closed with a strong display of Scottish talent in the World premiere of Since Yesterday: The Untold Story of Scotland's Girl Bands and a Midnight Madness UK premiere of The Substance.

== People ==
=== Direction ===
The current Director of the EIFF is Paul Ridd who was appointed in 2024. Below is a list of previous directors:

Director	From	To	Notes
Murray Grigor	1967	1973	
Linda Myles	1973	1980	
Jim Hickey	1981	1988	
David Robinson	1988	1992	
Shane Danielsen	1992	2002	
Hannah McGill	2006	2010	After McGill's departure, the EIFF appointed a series of guest curators led by producer James Mullighan from 2010 to 2012
Chris Fujiwara	2012	2014	
Mark Adams	2014	2019	2020 EIFF was cancelled due to COVID-19 pandemic
Kirsty Matheson	2021	2023	
Kate Taylor	2023	2024	
Paul Ridd	2024	Present	

=== Patrons ===
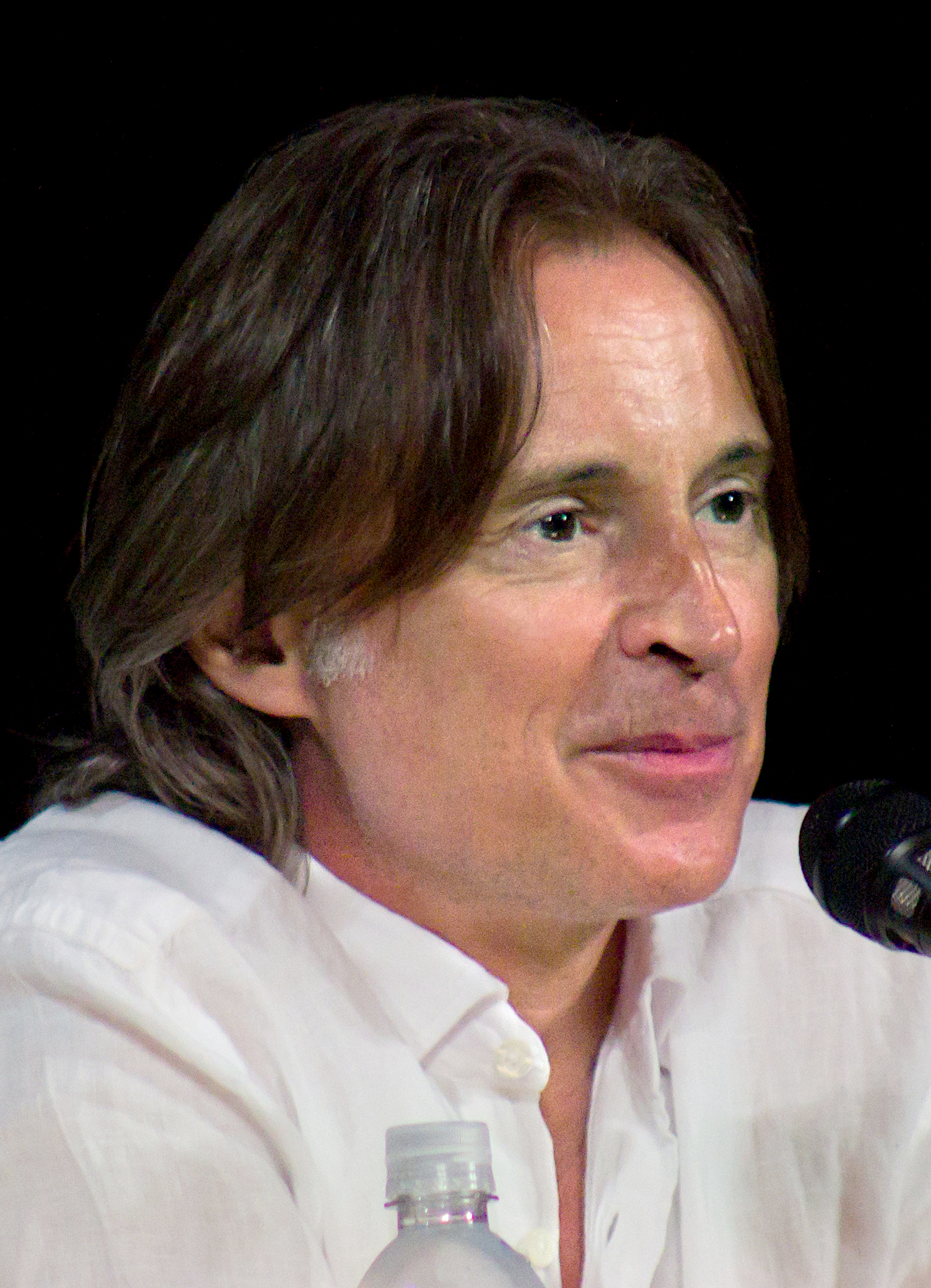
Robert Carlyle; Patron of the EIFF

Previous patrons of EIFF include Scottish actor Robert Carlyle, Scottish actor James Cosmo, Irish-Scottish director Mark Counsins, Scottish actress Karen Gillan, Irish cinematographer Seamus McGarvey, and Scottish actress Tilda Swinton. Sean Connery was also a previous patron.

== Entries ==
The EIFF accepts submissions of short films (30 minutes or less runtime) and feature films (over 31 minutes runtime), and each incurs a submission fee for entry. Submissions normally open in the January of a year and the deadline will be the April of the same year, with the Festival taking place that August.

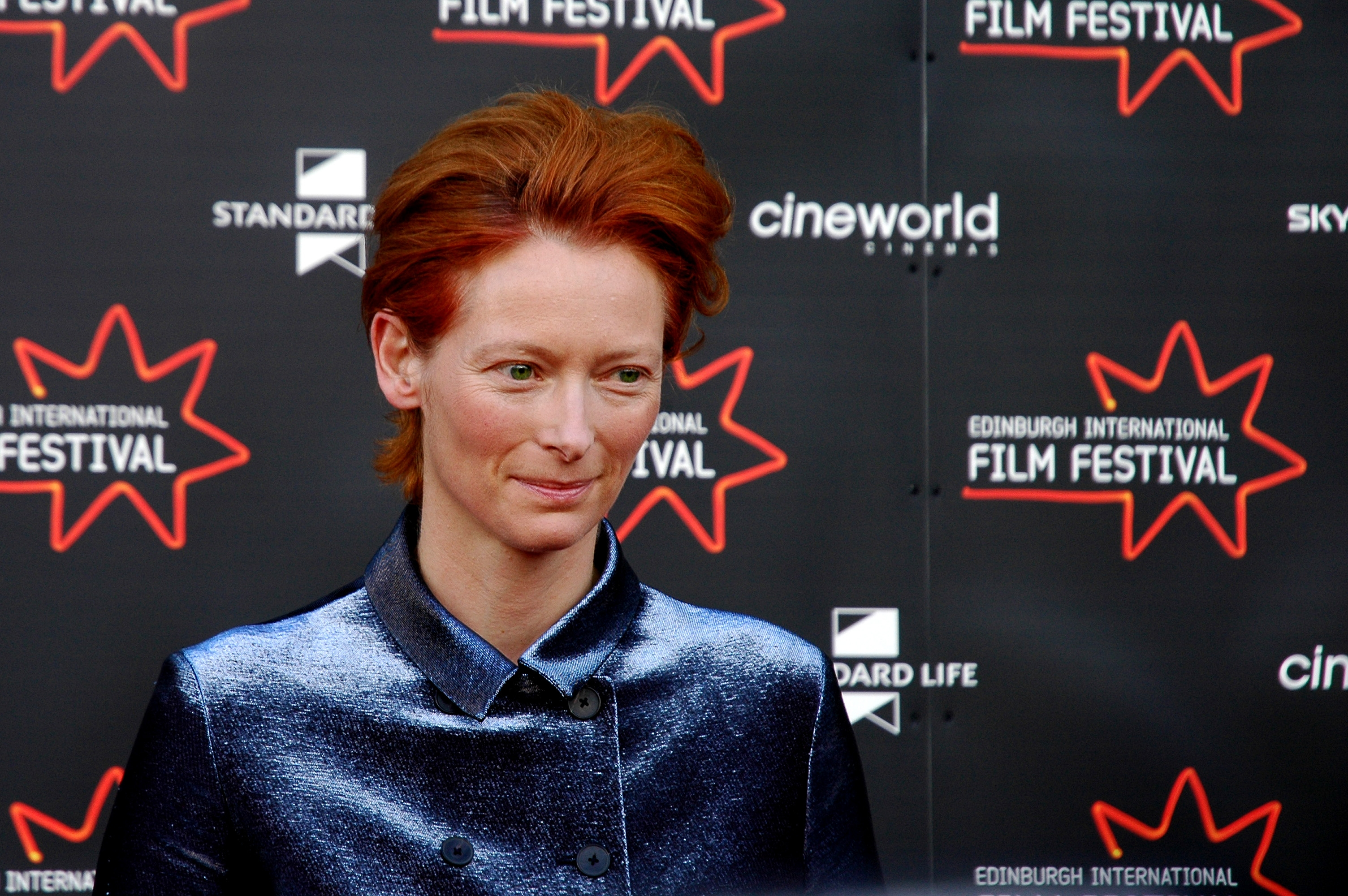
Tilda Swinton; Patron of the EIFF; at EIFF 2007

== Festival programme ==
EIFF's 2024 relaunch heralded a new Festival programme, comprising the following categories:

- Competition Features: the winning filmmaker is awarded £50,000 to support their future projects. Decided by an audience vote, the winner is announced at the end of the Festival.
- Competition Shorts: a short film programme highlighting work from Scotland and beyond. Also decided by an audience vote, the winner is awarded £15,000 to support their future projects.
- Out of Competition: showcasing a selection of World and UK premieres.
- Midnight Madness: screened at midnight, these films are often accompanied by a short as well.
- Special Events and Retrospectives: Q&A's and dedicated screenings from a specific filmmaker, genre or narrative.
- Out of Competition Shorts
- Animation Shorts

== Venues ==
During the Festival's early years, screenings took place at various cinemas and other venues across the city of Edinburgh, including the New Victoria in Clerk Street, the Playhouse in Leith Walk, the Odeon on Lothian Road and the Central Hall in Tollcross.

Film House: Hill Street

In 1946, the Festival established its roots in the Film House on 6–8 Hill Street. Norman Wilson, who was Chairman of the Edinburgh Film Guild and EIFF at the time, wrote in 1951: "Since its inception, the Film Guild has always maintained premises of some sort. For one reason or another, we were continually migrating and never finding satisfaction in any of the places we rented. The only solution was to obtain a house of our own." Film House was crucial in enabling the Guild to launch the first International Festival of Documentary Films (later renamed the Edinburgh International Film Festival). The first Festival office was at Film House, and most screenings took place in the Guild Theatre at Film House.

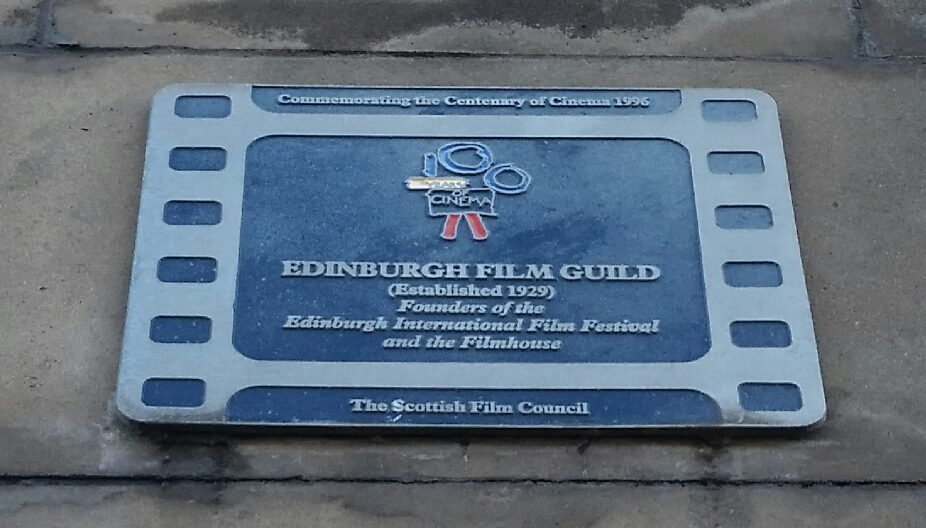
Edinburgh Film Guild plaque

Film House: Randolph Crescent

In 1958, EIFF relocated to a new Film House at 3 Randolph Crescent, a Georgian townhouse with its own cinema. The purchase of the building and the installation of a 100-seat cinema was funded entirely by the Guild. When not in use during EIFF, the cinema provided Edinburgh with its first "regional film theatre" based on the National Film Theatre in London. Film House continued as the base of EIFF until the property was sold in the late 1970s.

Filmhouse: Lothian Road

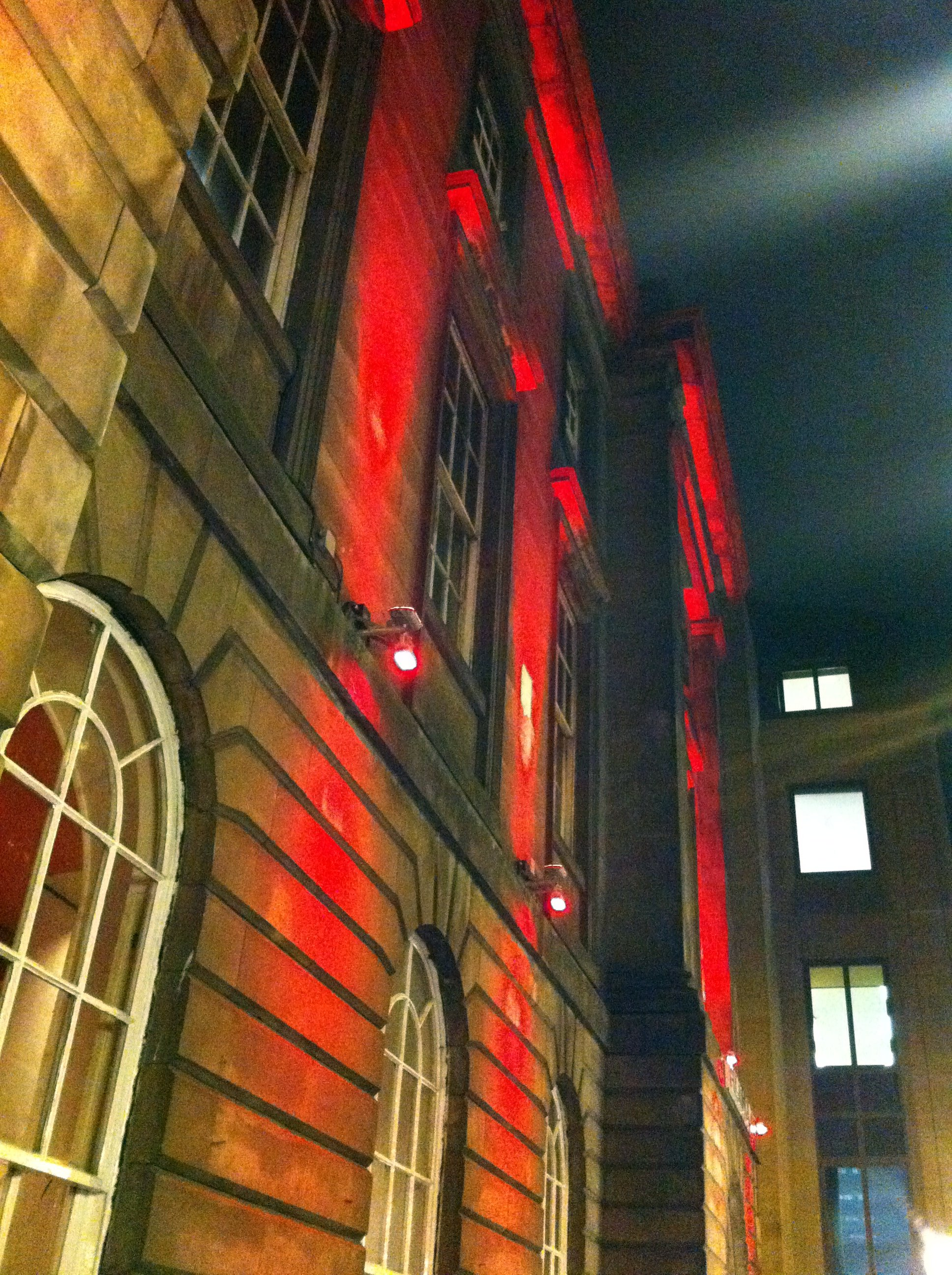
Exterior of the Filmhouse Café Bar, Lothian Road, Edinburgh

The Guild was one of the key partners in establishing "Filmhouse". As part of this, the Guild sold its Randolph Crescent property and invested in purchasing and developing 88 Lothian Road in 1976. The Guild's name "Film House" was initially retained at the new location, but the two words were eventually merged to become "Filmhouse". One of the Guild's intentions, stretching back as far as the 1940s, had been to create a regional film theatre for Scotland. It was hoped that the new Lothian Road property would make that intention a reality. Throughout its history, the Guild had been a private film society, which members of the public could join. The new Filmhouse was to be a large public cinema and early publicity described Filmhouse as "Scotland's new cinema centre". Screenings commenced in 1978. Full restoration work was completed in 1985, with the opening of the 280 seat Cinema 1, the café bar and Lothian Road entrance. Cinema 3 was added in 1997.

In 2010, the Centre for the Moving Image (CMI) was created to run both the Edinburgh International Film Festival and Filmhouse. The CMI abruptly went into administration in October 2022, resulting in the closure of Filmhouse, the Edinburgh International Film Festival, and the Belmont Cinema, Aberdeen (operated by the CMI from 4 April 2014).

Since the closure of Filmhouse in 2022

With CMI going into administration, there was a focus "on marketing the assets for sale, including the Edinburgh Filmhouse building, and looking to transfer the brand and trademark of EIFF".

Creative Scotland bought the EIFF brand, trademark and editions of the Film Festival had a special one year iteration in 2023 under the auspices of the Edinburgh International Festival. They partnered with cinema venues Vue Edinburgh Omni and Everyman Edinburgh at the St James Quarter, while the Old College Quad at the University of Edinburgh was used for the outdoor screening series, Cinema Under the Stars.

EIFF 2024 and onwards

2024 was regarded as "Year Zero" for the revitalised EIFF; a brand new organisation was established and they delivered a completely new iteration of the Festival, honouring its legacy while looking firmly to the future. EIFF initiated new collaborations and partnerships with the Edinburgh Festival Fringe, opening up the Film Festival programme in new venues across the city, including non-traditional cinema spaces in Summerhall, 50 George Square and Inspace. This allowed audiences to experience the Fringe along with the programme of cinema at EIFF.

== Awards ==
The Edinburgh International Film Festival has given out a number of awards at the end of its festival run.

=== Historical awards ===
- The McLaren Award for New British Animation (1990 - 2022). Supported by the British Council, this award recognised the spirit of creativity in new British short animation films. Named in honour of Norman McLaren, the renowned Scottish-born animator, was decided by an audience vote.
- The Michael Powell Award for Best British Feature Film (1993 - 2023). Named in homage to one of Britain's most original filmmakers, the Michael Powell Award was inaugurated in 1993, and supported by the UK Film Council since 2001. It sought to reward imagination and creativity in British filmmaking, judged by an international jury and carried a cash prize of £20,000.
- PPG Award for Best Performance in a British Feature Film (Inaugurated in 2007). Thanks to the support of PPG, this award was judged by the Michael Powell Jury. Recipients have been awarded cash prizes, ranging from £5,000 to £20,000.
- The Student Critics Jury Award (2012 - 2022). Supported by James and Morag Anderson. The initiative supported the future of film criticism, allowing 7 aspiring film critics the opportunity to gain practical experience in their craft under the guidance of established professional critics. Jury members are selected from applicants across Scotland's colleges and universities. In addition to giving the award, jury members wrote short essays about the films and the festival, of which selected pieces were published on the EIFF website.
- The Award for Creative Innovation in a Short Film (Inaugurated in 2013). Awarded by the Short Films Jury, this award celebrated imaginative and innovative work in short cinema.
- The Award for Outstanding Individual Contribution to a Short Film (Inaugurated in 2013). This award recognised individuals who made a significant impact on a short film's success.
- The Award for Best Documentary Feature. This award, which was re-introduced at EIFF 2014 after a three-year hiatus, recognised the immense strength of documentary filmmaking in pioneering new ways, imagining the world while insisting with urgency, creativity and vigour on the vital relationship between film and reality.
- The Powell and Pressburger Award for Best Feature Film (2022). In 2022, EIFF reimagined its major award, The Michael Powell Award for Best British feature, to honour the legacies of Michael Powell and Emeric Pressburger. Committed to internationalism and cultural exchange, this competition of 10 films was composed of a mix of UK and Irish filmmakers and international talents, spotlighting imagination and creativity in filmmaking.
- The Audience Award. Voted for by cinema-goers attending public screenings, this award embraced the Festival's ongoing commitment to engage audiences in discussions around arts and culture, and the future of cinema. Eligible films were selected from across the EIFF programme by the artistic director.
- The Award for Best Short Film. This award affirmed EIFF's long-standing support of directors of short films and intended both to recognise the outstanding achievements possible within the short format and to offer encouragement for the feature filmmakers of the future.
- The Award for Best International Feature Film. Decided by an international jury, this award has been given to filmmakers from outside the UK, accompanied by a £10,000 cash prize.
- The Award for Best Performance in a British Feature Film. Voted for by the Michael Powell Award Competition Jury.

=== 2024 – Present ===
These new EIFF awards were established in the Festival's 77th iteration in 2024 to support new and emerging filmmakers in their careers. Both awards are decided by audience vote.

- The Sean Connery Prize for Feature Filmmaking Excellence (2024-). This award is established and supported by The Sean Connery Foundation, an organisation which shares EIFF's commitment to providing a world-class platform for new talent in the heart of Scotland. Sir Sean Connery was a loyal and vital patron of the Festival, and so this award supports the film festival he so loved, in the hometown he cherished. Stephane Connery, chairman of the Sean Connery Foundation, said that the prize would help the charity expand "opportunities for talented young people from Scotland to access rewarding careers in the film industry". Recognising feature filmmaking excellence, a shortlist of 10 world-premiere films are screened at the Festival and the winner, decided by an audience vote, is awarded £50,000 to support their future projects.
- The Thelma Schoonmaker Prize for Short Filmmaking Excellence (2024-). This award is made possible by Thelma Schoonmaker, who is celebrated for her work as an editor on landmark moments in cinema history. It seeks to showcase world premieres of new exciting short form work from Scottish, UK, and international filmmakers. Decided by an audience vote, the winner is awarded £15,000 to support their future projects.

==== Winners ====
Year	Sean Connery Prize for Feature Filmmaking Excellence	Thelma Schoonmaker Prize for Short Filmmaking Excellence	Ref.
2024	The Ceremony (dir. Jack King)	Manny Wolfe (dir. Trevor Neuhoff)	
2025	Mortician (dir. Abdolreza Kahani)	Mother Goose (dir. Joanna Vymeris)	
2026	Skintown (dir. Kieron J. Walsh)	Grief Room (dir. Sinda Agha)	
