= Robert Gordon Wilson (architect) =

Scottish architect (1844–1931)

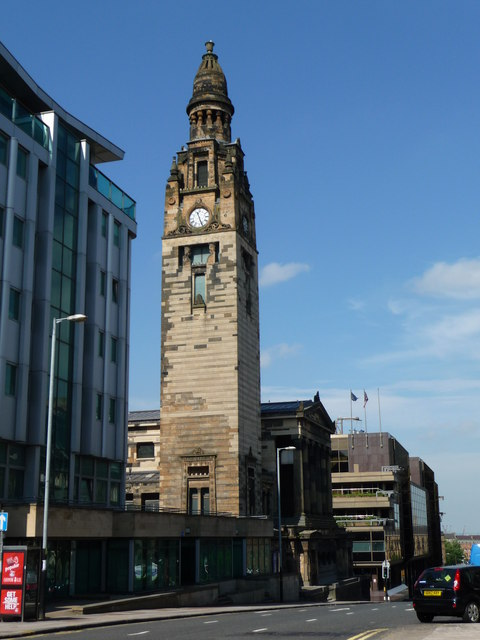
St. Vincent Street Church, Glasgow

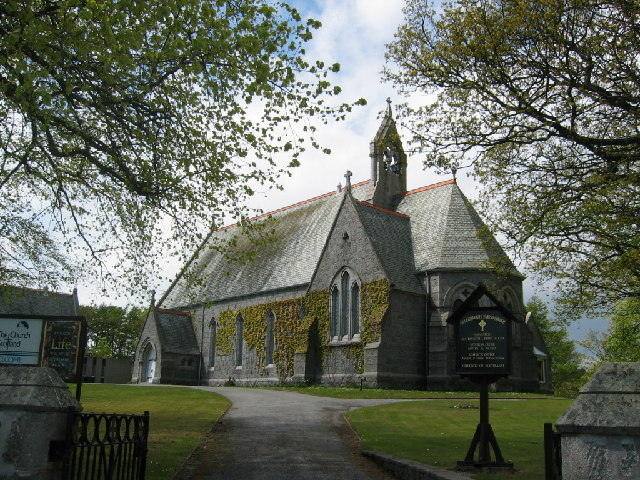
Craigiebuckler Church, Aberdeen

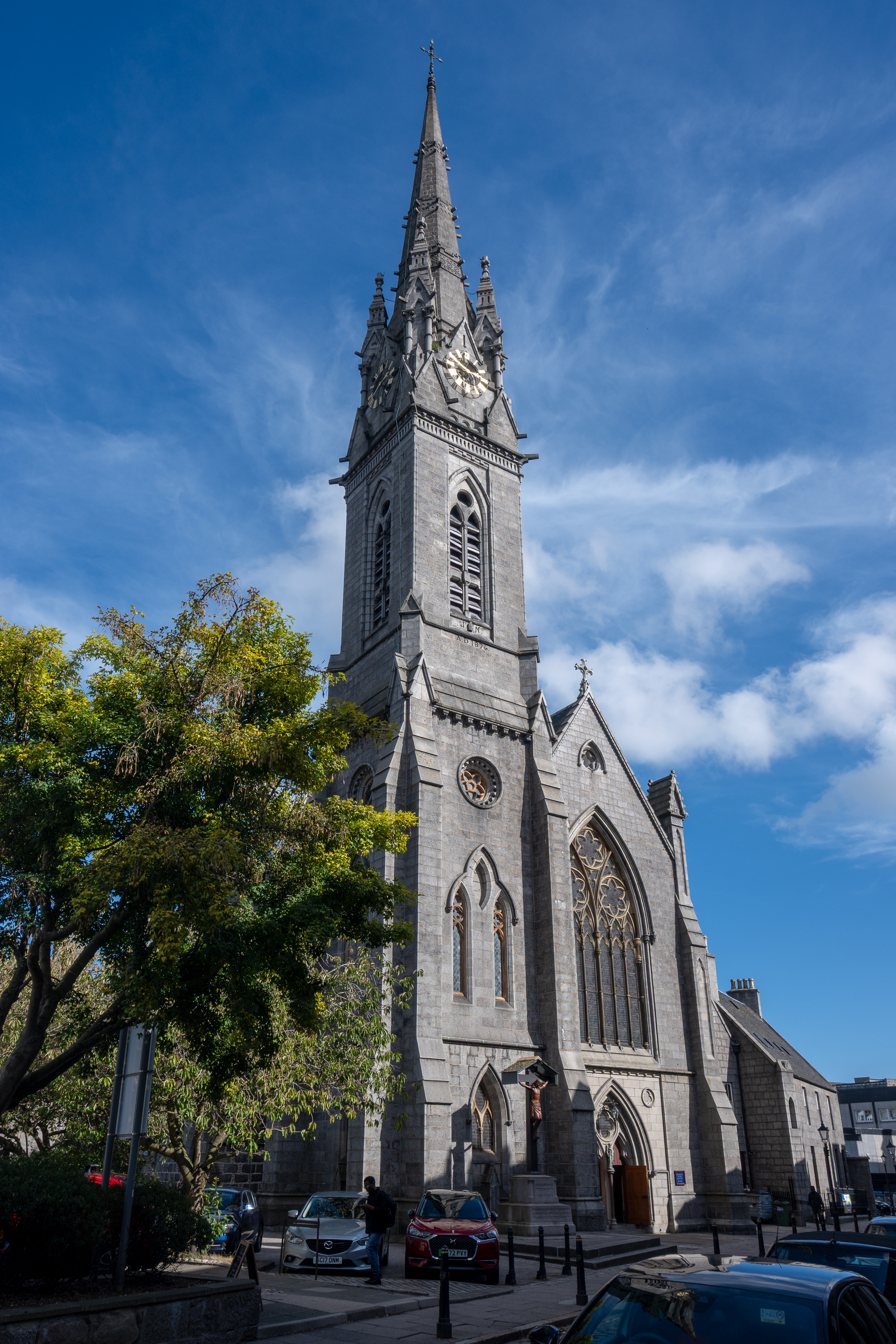
St Mary RC Cathedral Spire, Aberdeen

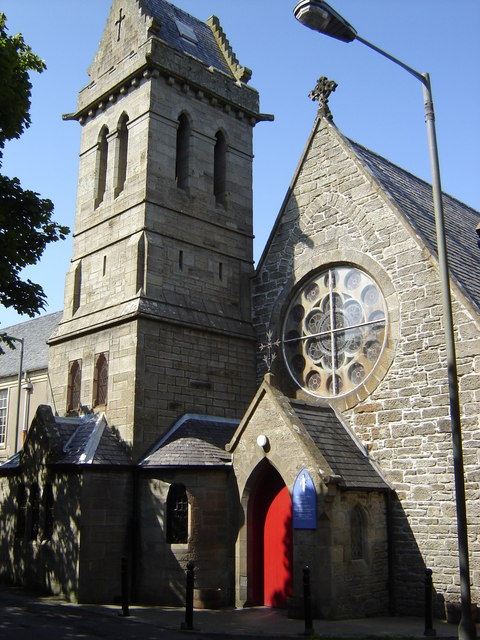
The tower on St. Magnus Episcopal Church, Lerwick

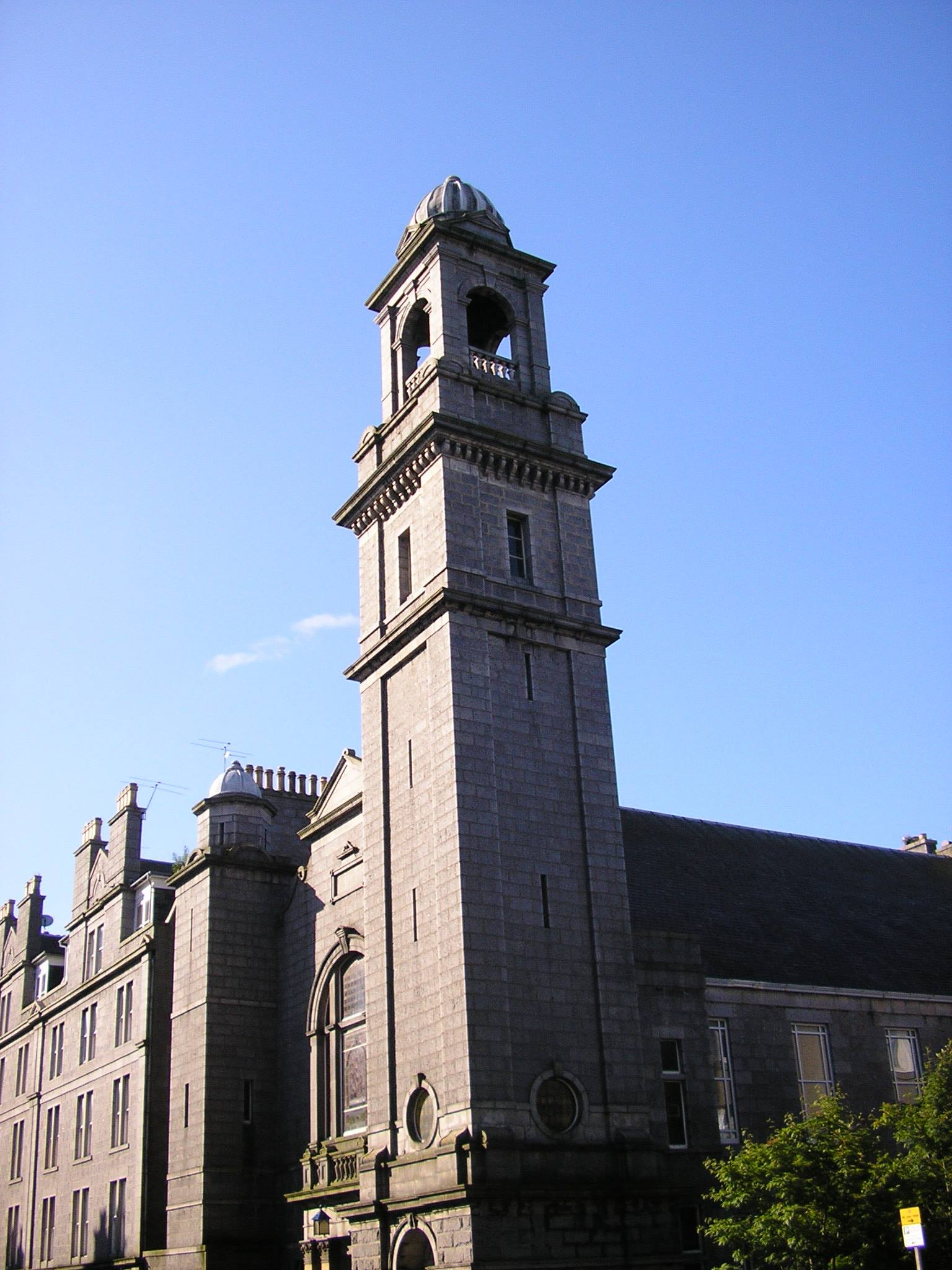
Bon Accord Free Church in Aberdeen

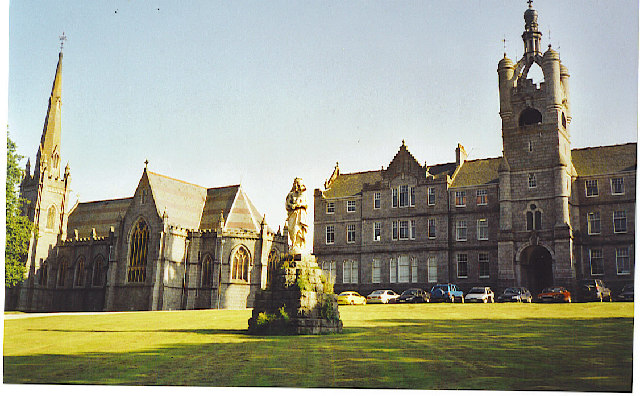
Blairs College

Robert Gordon Wilson (1844–1931) was a 19th/20th century Scottish architect based in Aberdeen. He was from a strong United Presbyterian background and specialised in churches for the United Presbyterian Church and Free Church of Scotland.

Many of his buildings are listed buildings.

== Life ==
He was born in New Pitsligo in 1844 the son of John Wilson, a master builder, and his wife, Eliza Gordon. He was articled (apprenticed) to Alexander Ellis (1830-1917), an architect-builder, in Aberdeen in 1859. Around 1866 he was placed in the office of Alexander Thomson (1817-1875), a well-known architect, later nicknamed "Greek Thomson". Thomson's style is evidenced in Wilson's work. In 1869 he returned to Ellis as a junior partner, with offices at 13 Belmont Street in Aberdeen.

Ellis retired in 1896 leaving Wilson as sole partner until 1906 when he was joined by his namesake son (1877-1939). He retired in 1915 leaving his son in charge.

Wilson served on Aberdeen Town Council 1914 to 1924. He was Chairman of the Plans Committee (overseeing Planning and Building Control matters). He was Chairman of the Rubislaw Granite Company, Chairman of Kilgour and Walker, and Director of Richards. His unpaid roles included Chairman of the Aberdeen Royal Asylum and the Aberdeen University Press. He was a Trustee of the Aberdeen Savings Bank.

He died on 28 July 1931. His son is buried in Springbank Cemetery, Aberdeen but it is unclear if they are buried together.

== Family ==
He married in December 1875. The following year both the partners and the joint families built a small terrace at Springbank Terrace in Aberdeen: the Wilson's lived at no 60.

== Works ==
His entire career focused upon churches. Even during his time with Alexander Thomson his had can be seen in several works, and his church connection seems to have led to him getting to work on the UP Church schemes.

=== Work with Thomson ===
- St Vincent Street UP Church (1867)
- Queen's Park UP Church and Hall (1868)

=== Works with Ellis ===
- Our Lady of Mount Carmel RC Church, Banff (1870)
- UP Manse, Banff (1871)
- St Joseph's RC Church, Dundee (1872)
- Craigiebuckler Church in Aberdeen (1873)
- Fraserburgh UP Church (1874) and manse (1877)
- Strichen School (1874)
- New Pitsligo School (1875)
- Rosehearty UP manse (1876)
- St Joseph's RC Presbytery, Aberdeen (1876)
- Tower and Spire, St Mary's of the Assumption RC Church, Aberdeen (1877) spire added to mark the church being given cathedral status
- Park Free Church, Drumoak, Aberdeen (1879)
- Carden Place UP Church, Aberdeen (1880)
- Charlotte Street Hall, Aberdeen (1880)
- Victoria Buildings, Aberdeen (1880) also used as their new offices
- King Street School Aberdeen (1881)
- UP Church, Woodside, Aberdeen (1881)
- Pitsligo Parish Church, Rosehearty Aberdeen (1882)
- Virginia Street warehouse, Aberdeen (1883)
- Berryden factory and warehouse, Aberdeen (1885)
- New Deer Free Church (1885)
- Daily Free Press Offices and Printworks (1887)
- St Nicholas UP Church, Aberdeen (1887)
- Adelphi warehouse, Aberdeen (1890)
- Northern Newspaper Offices, Aberdeen (1891)
- Tower on St Magnus Episcopal Church, Lerwick (1891)
- Head Office for Great North of Scotland Railway Company, Aberdeen (1892)
- Offices for Aberdeen Press and Journal (1893)
- Canada House, Union St, Aberdeen (1893)
- Auction Hall, Silver Street, Aberdeen (1894)
- Bon Accord Free Church Aberdeen (1894)
- Our Lady and St Drostans RC Church, Fraserburgh (1895)

=== Solo Work ===
- Walker Road School, Torry, Aberdeen (1895)
- Aberdeen United Trades Council Hall (1896) - location of The Belmont Cinema
- Culter School (1896)
- Cults School (1896)
- St Paul's UP Church, Aberdeen (1896)
- Blairs College, Aberdeenshire (1897) - his largest single project
- Sangster and Henderson Department Store, Union St, Aberdeen (1897)
- St Joseph's RC Girls School, Aberdeen (1897)
- Troup House, Banffshire (1897)
- Church for Church of Scotland, Gardenstown (1899)
- Murtle Hydropathic, Milltimber (1899)
- UP manse, Aberchirder (1899)
- Aberdeen Electric Company (1900)
- Aberdeen Riding Academy (1900)
- Aberdeen Town and Country Bank (1901)
- Broadlord Works, Aberdeen (1901)
- RC School Aberdeen (1901)
- Aberdeen Crown Court (1903)
- Gallowgate United Free Church, Aberdeen (1903)
- Public School Huntly, Aberdeenshire (1903)
- Linden Centre, Huntly, Aberdeenshire (1903)
- Warehouse, Maberly St, Aberdeen (1903)
- Angusfield House, Aberdeen (1904)

=== Works with his Son ===
- Sausage Factory for R D Waddell, Berryden, Aberdeen (1910)
- Banchory Ternan School (1913)
