= Edinburgh Filmhouse =

Church building repurposed as a cinema, in Edinburgh, Scotland

Filmhouse

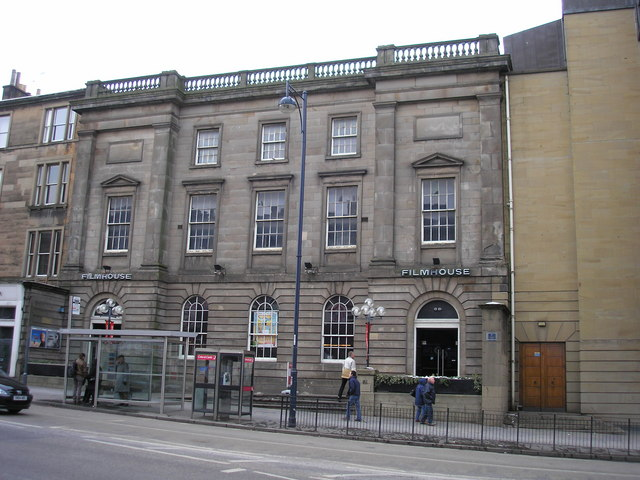
- The front of the Edinburgh Filmhouse

- Location within Edinburgh city centre
- Location: Edinburgh, Scotland
- Coordinates: 55°56′47.18″N 3°12′22.10″W
- Owner: Caledonian Heritable
- Operator: Filmhouse (Edinburgh) Ltd

Construction
- Opened: 1979
- Years active: 1979–2022, 2025–

Website
- www.filmhouse.org.uk

The Edinburgh Filmhouse is a cinema located in Edinburgh, Scotland, which opened in 1979. It is home to the world's oldest continually running film festival, Edinburgh International Film Festival. The cinema closed in October 2022 when its parent body went into administration. In September 2023, a campaign organised by former staff to reopen the cinema got underway. The building re-opened in June 2025.

== History ==
The building that houses the Filmhouse was erected in 1831 as the United Presbyterian Church (later United Free Church), designed by David Bryce in a neoclassical villa style. It later became St. Thomas's Church of Scotland.

The cinema began life in 1979, when The Filmhouse Ltd was established to develop the former church building, expanding the services previously offered by the Edinburgh Film Guild at their premises in Randolph Crescent. The disused St. Thomas's Church was converted into a 100-seat auditorium (later Cinema 2) accessed via a side entrance in Morrison Street Lane. The front of the building was listed and remained inaccessible until 1985 when a new 280-seat auditorium and bar were added and the front entrance opened. It was located in Lothian Road near the Usher Hall, Traverse Theatre and Lyceum Theatre.

In 2015, the cinema showed Interstellar (film) in 70 mm film.

In March 2020, the Filmhouse announced plans to extend its premises into a new "film hub", to be erected in Festival Square, next to the existing premises. This was a revival of a plan that failed to win backing in 2004. The proposed extension was never built.

Starting in 2001, Edinburgh Filmhouse hosted the Edinburgh Greek Festival.

== Running ==
From 2010, Filmhouse was incorporated into Centre for the Moving Image (CMI), a registered charity which also incorporated the Edinburgh International Film Festival, Edinburgh Film Guild and the Belmont Filmhouse in Aberdeen.

Since its inception it has hosted the Edinburgh International Film Festival annually.

The Filmhouse is a publicly funded arthouse cinema. Its programme ranges from art-house and foreign cinema to mainstream and second run films seven days a week. Extensive film education, informal and formal, for audiences of all ages, have also taken place.

The building includes a cafe and bar.

On 6 October 2022 the CMI went into administration and closed its operations including the Filmhouse while seeking buyers for its assets. In April 2023, Caledonian Heritable, which owns several pubs in Edinburgh, purchased the building for £2.65 million. In July, the firm announced that they were close to reaching a deal with a group of former Filmhouse staff that would allow the cinema to re-open. That deal was reached and in September a fundraising campaign was launched to fund extensive refurbishment of the cinemas and cafe bar before a planned reopening in summer 2024.

In January 2025, it was announced that the refurbishment of the cafe-bar and foyer space would be completed by the end of May, with the cinemas being reopened in June. The entire building (cafe-bar, foyer and cinemas) re-opened on 27 June 2025, despite £100,000 still being needed for "vital" improvements to the projection equipment.
