= The Belmont Cinema =

Arthouse cinema in Aberdeen, Scotland, United Kingdom

The Belmont Cinema and Media Centre
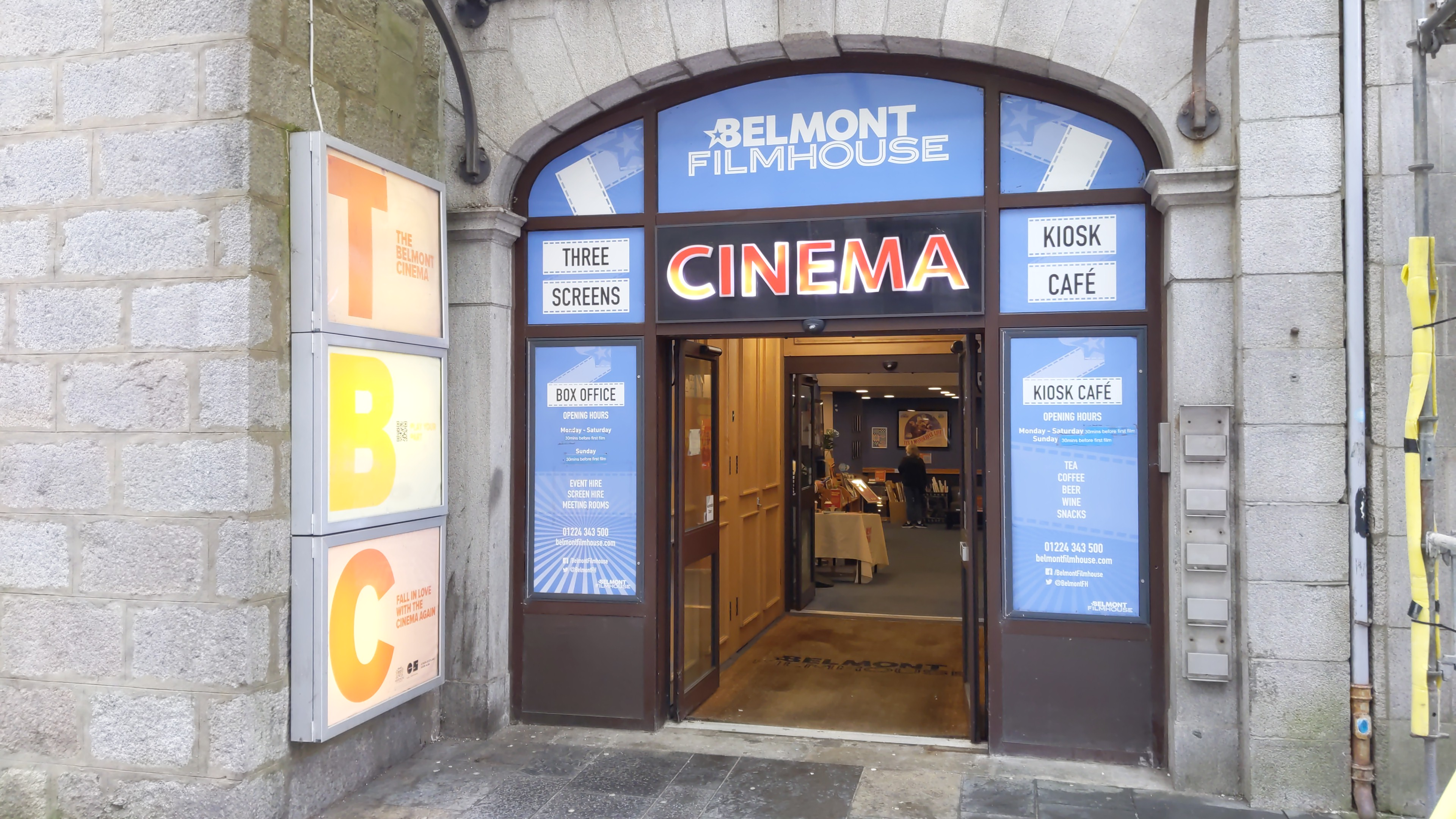
- Entrance to The Belmont Cinema at Aberdeen's Doors Open Day 2024
- Interactive map of The Belmont Cinema and Media Centre
- Address: Belmont Street, Aberdeen AB10 1JS
- Coordinates: 57°08′50″N 2°06′09″W
- Owner: Aberdeen City Council
- Operator: Belmont Community Cinema Ltd

Construction
- Built: 1896
- Opened: 22 August 1910; 116 years ago (original); 15 September 2000; 25 years ago (most recent)
- Closed: 29 March 1952; 74 years ago (original); 6 October 2022; 3 years ago (most recent)
- Architects: Alexander Ellis; Robert Gordon Wilson

Website
- www.belmontcinema.co.uk

Listed Building – Category C(S)
- Official name: The Belmont Cinema and Media Centre (former Trades Council Hall)
- Designated: 24 April 1987
- Reference no.: LB20132

The Belmont Cinema is an arthouse cinema on Belmont Street, Aberdeen, Scotland and is the last remaining independent cinema in the city.

The cinema building is the property of Aberdeen City Council and is temporarily closed following the collapse of its former operator, the Centre for the Moving Image (CMI), in 2022.

The charity, Belmont Community Cinema Ltd were named by Aberdeen City Council as preferred operator for the site in September 2023.

Following a successful application to the National Lottery Heritage Fund, the charity announced intentions to reopen the site in late 2027.

The cinema is a grade C listed building.

== History ==
=== Trades council hall ===
The building was constructed in 1896 as a trades hall to a design by architects, Alexander Ellis and Robert Gordon Wilson. It was principally used for meetings of Aberdeen's newly established Labour Movement. The first film was shown on the premises in 1898, and featured footage of Queen Victoria at Balmoral Castle, establishing a tradition of hosting visiting cinema shows.

=== Conversion to a cinema ===
In 1910, the Trades Hall was converted into a permanent cinema called the Coliseum, which opened on 22 August of that year. It was refurbished and reopened as the New Kinema on 11 April 1921. After another refurbishment in 1935, it was renamed the Belmont Cinema. It closed on 29 March 1952, and the building was converted into a warehouse.

=== Picturehouse Cinemas ownership ===
The building reopened under lease to Picturehouse Cinemas as the Belmont Picturehouse on 15 September 2000, after a major refurbishment by Aberdeen City Council with assistance from the National Lottery and Scottish Screen.

After some turmoil and uncertainty, the lease for exploitation on the Belmont to Picturehouse was extended in April 2011 for a further ten years. However, with the purchase of Picturehouse Cinemas by Cineworld, the company were forced to sell the Belmont due to a ruling by the Competition Commission that it had created unfair competition in the city.

=== Centre for the Moving Image ownership ===
In April 2014, Centre for the Moving Image (CMI) took over the lease and renamed the premises Belmont Filmhouse as a sister cinema to the Edinburgh Filmhouse. It closed in October 2022 when CMI ceased trading and entered administration.

=== Closure and refurbishment ===
Following CMI's collapse, the 'Save The Belmont Cinema' campaign was founded by local cinephiles and business people. This led to the creation of Belmont Community Cinema Ltd, a local charity dedicated to reopening the Belmont which was selected as preferred operator for the cinema by Aberdeen City Council in September 2023.

At a public meeting in October 2023, the new company pledged to put film, education, community and customer experience at the heart of a newly reinvigorated offering at the site.

Following a successful application to the National Lottery Heritage Fund, the company announced intentions to reopen the site in late 2027.
