= Inspace =

Exhibition space in Edinburgh, Scotland

Coordinates: 55.94488°N 3.1866°W

Inspace is an events and exhibition space within the campus of the University of Edinburgh, situated in Crichton Street in the southside of the city. Currently the space is the home for the Institute for Design Informatics. Inspace presents a programme of public exhibitions and events that span art, technology and design, including festival events that are part of the programme of the Edinburgh Science Festival.

It was designed by Architects Reiach and Hall within the University of Edinburgh’s Informatics Forum and opened in 2010.

The gallery features large street-facing windows with back-projection screens to display media to the public outside the building.

== History ==
In 2009, the Inspace Joint Research Partnership was formed to explore the cultural significance of informatics and new media practice. Professor Jon Oberlander was a driving force behind the creation of Inspace, and was a board member of New Media Scotland which was based in Inspace for several years. Inspace was intended to be a design laboratory and exhibition space within the new Informatics Forum building, and an interface between the city and the university.
