= Belmont Street, Aberdeen =

Street in Aberdeen, Scotland, United Kingdom

Coordinates: 57.14687°N 2.10139°W

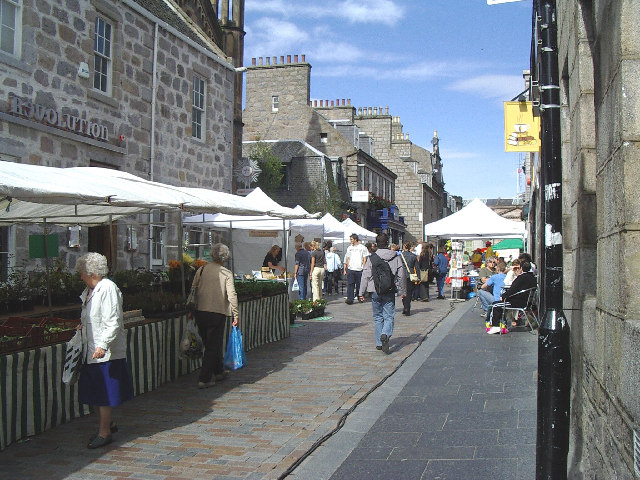
Belmont Street Farmers Market, the Aberdeen Country Fair, is held on the last Saturday of every month.

Belmont Street is a north-south street in the centre of Aberdeen, Scotland that runs perpendicular to Union Street.

Belmont Street originated with the late 18th century expansion of the town. It was part of an expansion out of the town into suburbs to the west by the towns richer denizens. For example, Thomas Menzies of Pitfodels, one of Aberdeen's wealthiest merchants of the time, moved from his long-standing town house on Castle Street (which is now the site of the North of Scotland Bank) to a five-bay two-storey house on Belmont Street in 1788. The street overlooked the valley of the River Denburn and was developed on vacant ground there in the 1780s, housing there initially comprising the domiciles of the wealthy, typified by large town houses with gardens running down to the river. A few of the houses from the late 18th century still survive on Belmont Street today, including Menzies'.

There were several churches on Belmont Street. The Triple Kirks, a free church established in 1844 at the junction of Belmont Street and Schoolhill, was deliberately sited with the intention of rivalling the established "Auld Kirk" of St Nicholas parish. A building to house the unification of the East, South, and West free churches of the town, it was designed by Archibald Simpson. There is now a pub, the Triple Kirks, on the site. The South Church is also on Belmont Street. In November 1779, the anti-Burgher United Presbyterians of north Aberdeen moved to a purpose-built 800-seat church on Belmont Street. The Relief United Presbyterians established a Belmont Street congregation a little after 1778, when funds began to be raised for a 1000-seat church. In 1828, the Belmont Chapel of Ease, as it had come to be, became a fully fledged parish church, under the ministership of Reverend John Bryce.

The Belmont Cinema is located on Belmont Street - it operated as a cinema between 1898 and 2022 when it closed along with the Edinburgh Filmhouse.
