= Mitsuami no Kami-sama =

Japanese manga series

- Tankōbon volume cover

みつあみの神様
- Manga
- Written by: Machiko Kyō
- Published by: Shueisha
- Magazine: Jump X
- Original run: August 25, 2011 – May 10, 2013
- Volumes: 1
- Anime film

Pigtails
- Directed by: Yoshimi Itazu
- Produced by: Keiko Matsushita
- Written by: Miho Maruo
- Music by: Ichiko Aoba
- Studio: Production I.G
- Licensed by: UK: Anime Limited
- Released: October 24, 2015
- Runtime: 28 minutes
- icon

Mitsuami no Kami-sama (みつあみの神様; lit. 'God with the Braided Pigtail Hair') is a Japanese manga series written and illustrated by Machiko Kyō. It was serialized in Shueisha's seinen manga magazine Jump X from August 2011 to May 2013, with its chapters collected in a single tankōbon volume. A 28-minute anime film produced by Production I.G, released internationally as Pigtails, premiered in Japan in October 2015.

== Media ==
=== Manga ===
Written and illustrated by Machiko Kyō, Mitsuami no Kami-sama was serialized in Shueisha's seinen manga magazine Jump X from August 25, 2011, to May 10, 2013. Shueisha collected its chapters in a single tankōbon released on July 16, 2013.

=== Film ===
A 28-minute anime film adaptation produced by Production I.G premiered on October 24, 2015. It was released internationally under the title Pigtails. The film had its Canadian premiere at the 20th Fantasia International Film Festival in July 2016. Anime Limited released the film in the United Kingdom on a home video set titled Pigtails and Other Short Films (alongside Kick-Heart, Li'l Spider Girl, Drawer Hobs, and Oval × Over) on March 25, 2019.

== Reception ==
The manga won the Tezuka Osamu Cultural Prize's New Artist Prize in 2014.

The film won the 2016 California Film Awards' Diamond Award in the Animated Film category. It also won the North American Film Awards' Special Jury Award in 2017.

== See also ==
- Cocoon, another manga series by the same author
