= Cocoon (manga) =

Japanese manga series

- Cover of the volume

コクーン (Kokūn)
- Genre: War
- Manga
- Written by: Machiko Kyō
- Published by: Akita Shoten
- English publisher: NA: Viz Media
- Magazine: Elegance Eve
- Original run: March 26, 2009 – May 27, 2010
- Volumes: 1
- Anime television film
- Directed by: Yukimitsu Ina
- Produced by: Kouhei Nehyo
- Written by: Yukimitsu Ina; Taku Kishimoto
- Music by: Kensuke Ushio
- Studio: Sasayuri
- Licensed by: NA: GKIDS
- Original network: NHK BS, NHK General TV
- Released: March 30, 2025 (early broadcast); August 25, 2025 (main broadcast)
- Runtime: 60 minutes
- icon

Cocoon (Japanese: コクーン, Hepburn: Kokūn) is a Japanese manga series written and illustrated by Machiko Kyō (今日マチ子). It was serialized in Akita Shoten's josei manga magazine Elegance Eve from March 2009 to May 2010. An anime television film adaptation produced by Sasayuri premiered in March 2025.

== Synopsis ==
A story based on the real life group called the Himeyuri students.

== Characters ==
Mayu (マユ)
Voiced by: Hikari Mitsushima (Japanese); Anjali Kunapaneni (English)
San (サン)
Voiced by: Marika Itō (Japanese); Lauren Kong (English)

== Media ==
=== Manga ===
Written and illustrated by Machiko Kyō, Cocoon was serialized in Akita Shoten's josei manga magazine Elegance Eve from March 26, 2009, to May 27, 2010. The series is the first part of Kyō's trilogy of manga about war. Its chapters were collected into a single book volume on August 5, 2010. A single tankōbon volume that consists of the series' chapters and a side-story was released on April 17, 2015.

In October 2025, Viz Media announced that they licensed the series for English publication.

No.	Original release date	Original ISBN	English release date	English ISBN
1	August 5, 2010 (book); April 17, 2015 (paperback)	978-4-253-10490-6 (book); 978-4-253-18138-9 (paperback)	June 16, 2026	978-1-9747-1684-5
1. "Island of the Sun"; 2. "Soapy Hands"; 3. "White Shadows"; 4. "Darkness and Pen-Nib"; 5. "A Place for Corpses"; 6. "Deactivation Order"; 7. "Sweet Milk"; 8. "Sea of Flames"; 9. "Sweep the Sand"; 10. "Below the Stars"; 11. "Blackbird"; 12. "Scattered Camelia Petals"; 13. "After the Fireworks"; 14. "High Tide"; 15. "A New World"; Side story: "Birthday Cake"

=== Anime ===
An anime television film adaptation was announced on June 27, 2023. It is produced by Sasayuri and directed by Yukimitsu Ina, with Hitomi Tateno serving as animation producer and Kensuke Ushio composing the music. The 60-minute film premiered with an early broadcast on March 30, 2025, on NHK BS, followed by a main broadcast on August 25 on NHK General TV. GKIDS licensed the film for an official English release. It was released in North American cinemas on September 4, 2026. It will be released on Blu-ray on January 19, 2027.

== Reception ==
The series won the Best One-Shot Manga Award category at the 3rd American Manga Awards in 2026.

== See also ==
- Mitsuami no Kami-sama, another manga series by the same author
