= Edinburgh Film Guild =

The Edinburgh Film Guild (EFG) is a film society based in Edinburgh, Scotland. Founded in 1929, it is notable as the oldest continuously running film society in the world. Though pre-dated by the original (London) Film Society, founded five years earlier, it has outlasted it, with the Film Society having ceased operation in 1939. The EFG is also of note for having established the Edinburgh International Film Festival in 1947.

According to Scottish film theorist and documentarian John Grierson the EFG was of particular importance for promoting a wide view of cinema. Writing in 1951 he commented:

"The old London Film Society was the first to break from somewhat exclusive attention to the avant-garde and take the longer and harder way of the Russians and more purposive users of the cinema. But it was the Edinburgh Film Guild which completed the movement - as the London Film Society did not - and saw the infinite variety of a Film Society's obligations to all categories of the medium".

From 1980 until 2022, the EFG was based in the Filmhouse Cinema in Lothian Road, Edinburgh, where it has its clubrooms, offices and cinema. Since the Filmhouse entered administration the Guild has continued to offer screenings and its educational programme.

Run by volunteers on a non-profit basis, the EFG screens films at several venues including the French Institute for Scotland. The programme is organised on the basis of mini-seasons linked by some common element, of director, performer, country, genre or theme.
