= Centre for the Moving Image =

Centre for the Moving Image (CMI)
- Abbreviation: CMI
- Type: Registered charity
- Headquarters: Edinburgh, Scotland
- Region served: Scotland, UK
- Main organ: Edinburgh International Film Festival, Edinburgh Filmhouse, Belmont Filmhouse

The Centre for the Moving Image (CMI) is a registered charity comprising Edinburgh International Film Festival, Edinburgh Filmhouse and, since April 2014, the Belmont Filmhouse, Aberdeen.

Its stated aim is to "We believe in transforming lives through the watching, making and understanding of film. We are guided by our values, which underpin all of our work."

On 6 October 2022 the CMI went into administration, with immediate closure of its operations while seeking buyers for its assets. Representatives of the charity cited a "perfect storm of sharply rising costs, in particular energy costs, alongside reduced trade due to the ongoing impacts of the pandemic and the cost of living crisis" as challenges that led to the charity developing an unsustainable cash flow problems and debt.

Both the Edinburgh Filmhouse and the Belmont Filmhouse closed in 2022 when CMI went into administration. The Edinburgh Filmhouse reopened in June 2025 and the charity Belmont Community Cinema Ltd has announced intentions to reopen The Belmont Cinema in late 2027.
