= William Duncan =

William Duncan may refer to:

== Arts, entertainment, and literature ==
- William Cary Duncan (1874–1945), American playwright and author
- William Duncan (actor) (1879–1961), Scottish-born actor and director of film serials
- W. Murdoch Duncan (1909–1976), Scottish crime thriller author
- William "Willie" Duncan (born 1955), guitarist and singer with the Spider Murphy Gang

== Medicine and science ==
- Sir William Duncan, 1st Baronet (died 1774), Scottish physician
- William Duncan (American physician) (1840–1900)
- William Henry Duncan (1805–1863), English doctor and Britain's first Chief Medical Officer
- William Jolly Duncan (1894–1960), Scottish physicist

== Politicians ==
- William Addison Duncan (1836–1884), U.S. representative from Pennsylvania
- William C. Duncan (1820–1877), brewer, politician, and mayor of Detroit, Michigan
- William Duncan (Maryland politician) (1871–1925), American politician and lawyer
- William Garnett Duncan (1800–1875), U.S. representative from Kentucky
- William H. Duncan, American diplomat

== Sports ==
- Art Duncan (William James Arthur Duncan, 1891–1975), Canadian ice hockey professional and World War I flying ace
- Bill Duncan (1880–?), Scottish footballer
- William Butler Duncan (1862–1933), American yachtsman and adoptive son of William Butler Duncan (below)
- William Dow Duncan (1892–1961), New Zealand rugby player
- Bill Duncan (Jockey) (1900-1983), Australian jockey
- William Duncan (Australian cricketer) (1912–1943), Australian cricketer
- William Duncan (footballer) (1913–1975), Scottish association football player
- William Duncan (New Zealand cricketer) (1933–2008), New Zealand cricketer
- Willie Duncan (rugby union) (William Robert Duncan, born 1957), Irish international rugby union player from Northern Ireland
- Billy Duncan, Northern Ireland boxer

== Others ==
- W. Butler Duncan (1830–1912), Scottish-American banker and railroad executive, adoptive father of William Butler Duncan
- William Augustine Duncan (1811–1885), Scottish journalist and colonial official
- William Barr McKinnon Duncan (1922–1984), Scottish-born director of Imperial Chemical Industries, chief executive of Rolls-Royce
- William Duncan (missionary) (1832–1918), English-born Anglican missionary
- William Duncan (philosopher) (1717–1760), Scottish natural philosopher and classicist
- William fitz Duncan (1090/1094–1147), Scottish prince and general
- William Wallace Duncan (1839–1908), American bishop of the Methodist Episcopal Church, South
