= George Cossar Pringle =

Scottish teacher and author

- Born: 1858
- Died: c.1930 (aged 71–72)
- Occupations: teacher and author
- Known for: Rector of Peebles Burgh and County High School
- Notable work: Pringle History Map series
- Parents: George Pringle (father); Elizaabeth Cossar (mother)

George Cossar Pringle FRSE (1858–c.1930) was a Scottish school-teacher and author. He is mainly remembered for the Pringle History Map series.

== Life ==
He was born in 1858 the son of George Pringle (1820–1881) and his wife, Elizabeth Cossar (1827–1881).

He was Rector of Peebles Burgh and County High School for most of his later life. In 1908 he was elected a Fellow of the Royal Society of Edinburgh. His proposers were John Alison, John Brown Clark, David Fowler Lowe and George Chrystal. He resigned from the Society in 1920.

In the First World War he served on the Teachers War Service Committee.

== Publications ==
- Peebles and Selkirk
- Notes of Lessons on Thrift (1916)
