= Robert T. Skinner =

Scottish mathematician, historical author and antiquarian

Robert Taylor Skinner FSA Scot FRSE (1867–1946) was a 20th-century Scottish mathematician, historical author and antiquarian.

== Life ==
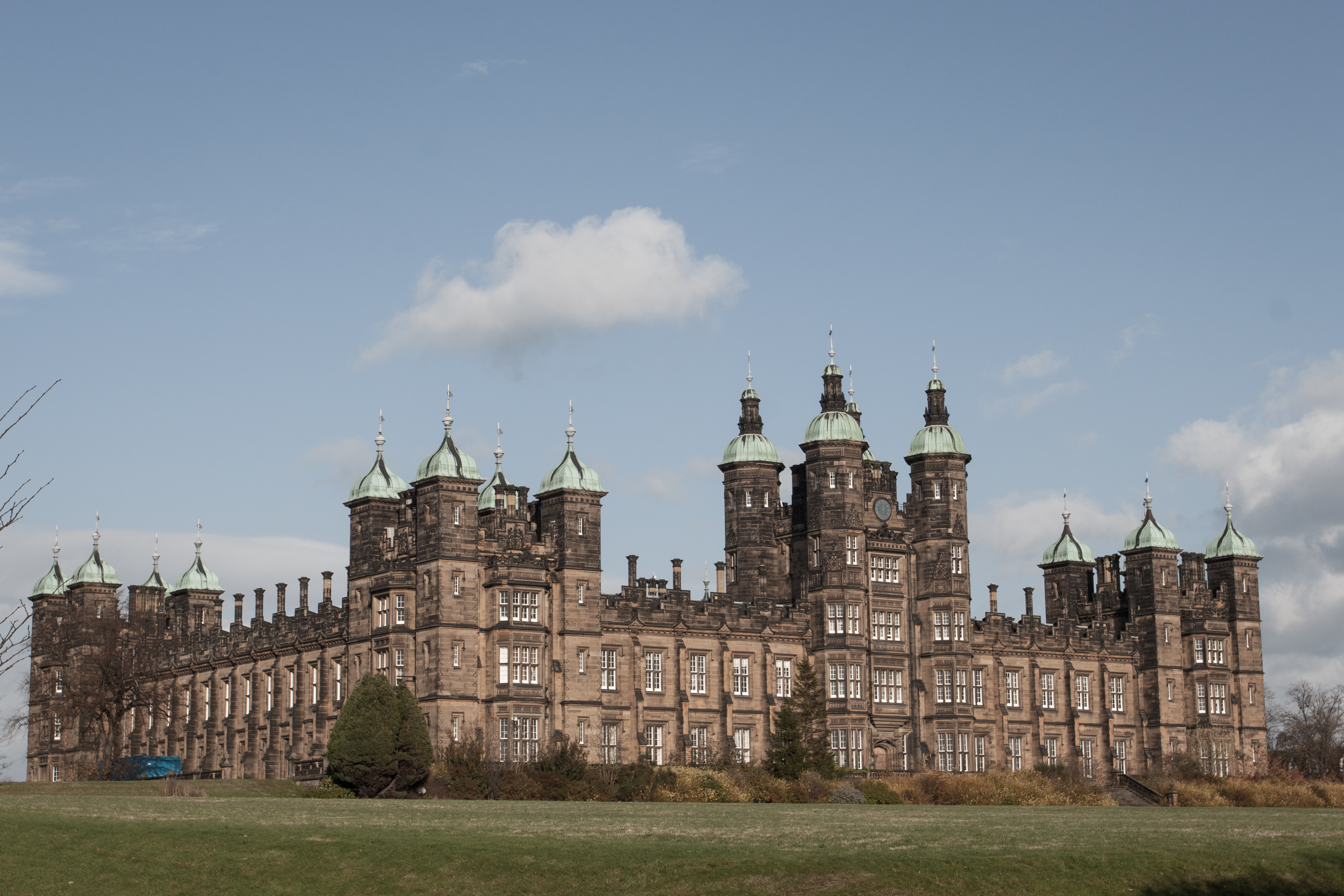
Donaldson's School

He was born at Bethelnie Farm near Aberdeen on 22 May 1867, one of 17 children of James Skinner (b. 1824), a farmer, and his wife, Jane Anderson (b. 1831). He was educated at Aberdeen Grammar School.

In 1893, he began teaching Mathematics at George Watson's College. He moved to Donaldson's School for the Deaf in 1899.

In 1903, he was elected a Fellow of the Royal Society of Edinburgh. His proposers were Robert McNair Ferguson, John Sturgeon Mackay, David Fowler Lowe, and John Brown Clark.

He was House Governor of Donaldson's Hospital and lived in his rooms there. He retired in 1932.

On retiral he lived at 35 Campbell Road in the Murrayfield district.

He died on 31 August 1946 and was buried in Dean Cemetery.

== Publications ==
- Men of the North-East (1920)
- In the Cevennes Without a Donkey (1926)
- A Notable Family of Scots Printers (1927) the story of the Donaldson family
- The Schoolmaster Looks Back (1947)
- The Royal Mile: Edinburgh Castle to Holyroodhouse (1928)
- Yesterday and Today (1929)
- Figures and Figureheads (1931)
