= John Watt Butters =

Scottish mathematician

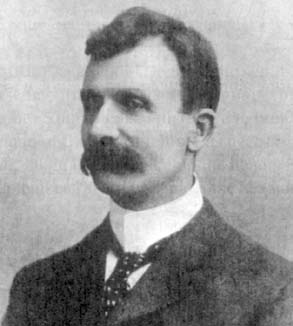

John Watt Butters FRSE FRSGS (1863–1946) was a Scottish mathematician who served as Rector of Ardrossan Academy from 1899 to 1928.

== Early life and education ==
He was born in Edinburgh in 1863, the son of Isabella Watt and John Butters, a tailor. His early education was at the Old High School in Edinburgh.

Attending George Heriot’s School from 1871 to 1876, his headmaster engendered a strong love of mathematics in him, and in later school years allowed him to act as a pupil-teacher, to younger pupils.

Initially studying to be a minister at the Established Free Church College, in conjunction with studies at the University of Edinburgh, his interests returned fully to mathematics and he graduated MA with First Class Honours in Mathematics and Natural Philosophy in 1894.

== Career and later life ==
After initial teaching roles in Aberystwyth and James Gillespies High School he returning as a full-time teacher to George Heriot’s School in 1888. He left in 1899 to take the role of Rector (headmaster) at Ardrossan Academy where he remained until retiral in 1928.

On retiral he returned to Edinburgh. Here he mixed a highly erudite circle of societies (Royal Scottish Geographical Society, Royal Society of Edinburgh, the Educational Institute of Scotland, and the Edinburgh Mathematical Society) with more individual and leisurely activities focussing on his love of hill-walking. He was also an active member of the Business Committee of the University of Edinburgh.

He died in Edinburgh on 11 January 1946.

== Recognition ==
He was elected a Fellow of the Royal Society of Edinburgh in April 1896, his proposers were George Chrystal, Peter Guthrie Tait, David Fowler Lowe and John Sturgeon Mackay.

He served as president of the Edinburgh Mathematical Society from 1900 to 1901.

== Family ==
He was married to the sister of Dr Arthur Crichton Mitchell. They had two daughters and a son.
