= Robert More (cricketer) =

Scottish cricketer

Personal information
- Full name: Robert Edwards More
- Born: 1 June 1982 (age 44); Leith, Midlothian, Scotland
- Batting: Left-handed
- Relatives: Hamish More (uncle)

Domestic team information
- Years: Team
- 2004: Scotland

Career statistics
Competition	List A
Matches	4
Runs scored	18
Batting average	4.50
100s/50s	–/–
Top score	10
Catches/stumpings	1/–
- Source: Cricinfo, 11 July 2022

Robert Edwards More (born 1 June 1982) is a Scottish solicitor-adovocate and former cricketer.

The son of George More, he was born at Leith in June 1982. More was educated at George Heriot's School, before matriculating to the University of Edinburgh. More was selected in the Scotland Under-19 squad for the 2002 Under-19 Cricket World Cup, making three appearances during the tournament. He later played for the senior Scotland side in 2004, making four appearances in English domestic List A one-day cricket. Three of these came in the 2004 Totesport League, with another coming in the 2004 Cheltenham & Gloucester Trophy against Essex at Edinburgh. By profession, More is currently a solicitor-advocate. His uncle, Hamish More, was also a cricketer.
