= William Gentle (headmaster) =

Scottish mathematician and physicist

William Gentle FRSE (19 January 1877 – 31 March 1964) was a Scottish mathematician and physicist, and headmaster of George Heriot's School from 1926 to 1942. He was President of the Science Teachers Association in Scotland.

== Life ==
He was born in Dundee on 19 January 1877 the third child of Marion Drummond Brand from Torryburn in Fife and William Gentle (1838–1890), a printer. He was raised at 12 Garland Place in Dundee. He attended Rosebank School then Morgan Academy. In 1889 his family moved to 2 Blackwood Crescent in Edinburgh, a Victorian flat in the south side of the city. He then attended George Heriot's School going on to study mathematics and other sciences at the University of Edinburgh, graduating in 1903 with a BSc. He studied geology under Professor James Geikie and mathematics under Professor George Chrystal. In autumn 1903 he returned to George Heriot's School as a teacher of mathematics and physics.

He was elected a Fellow of the Royal Society of Edinburgh in 1908. His proposers were James Gordon MacGregor, David Fowler Lowe, Thomas Burns and John Brown Clark. In the First World War he served as an officer in the Royal Field Artillery, and was wounded by shell-fire at Messines Ridge in 1917. Thereafter he concerned himself with supply of food to the troops, at one point finding himself responsible for feeding 7,000 men.

He returned to George Heriot's School after the war. In 1926 he succeeded John Brown Clark as headmaster at a salary of £1,000 per annum. He retired in 1942 and was succeeded by William Carnon.

He died in Edinburgh on 31 March 1964.

== Family ==
In 1924 he married Jessie Currie Ainslie.
