= Crown steeple =

Form of church steeple

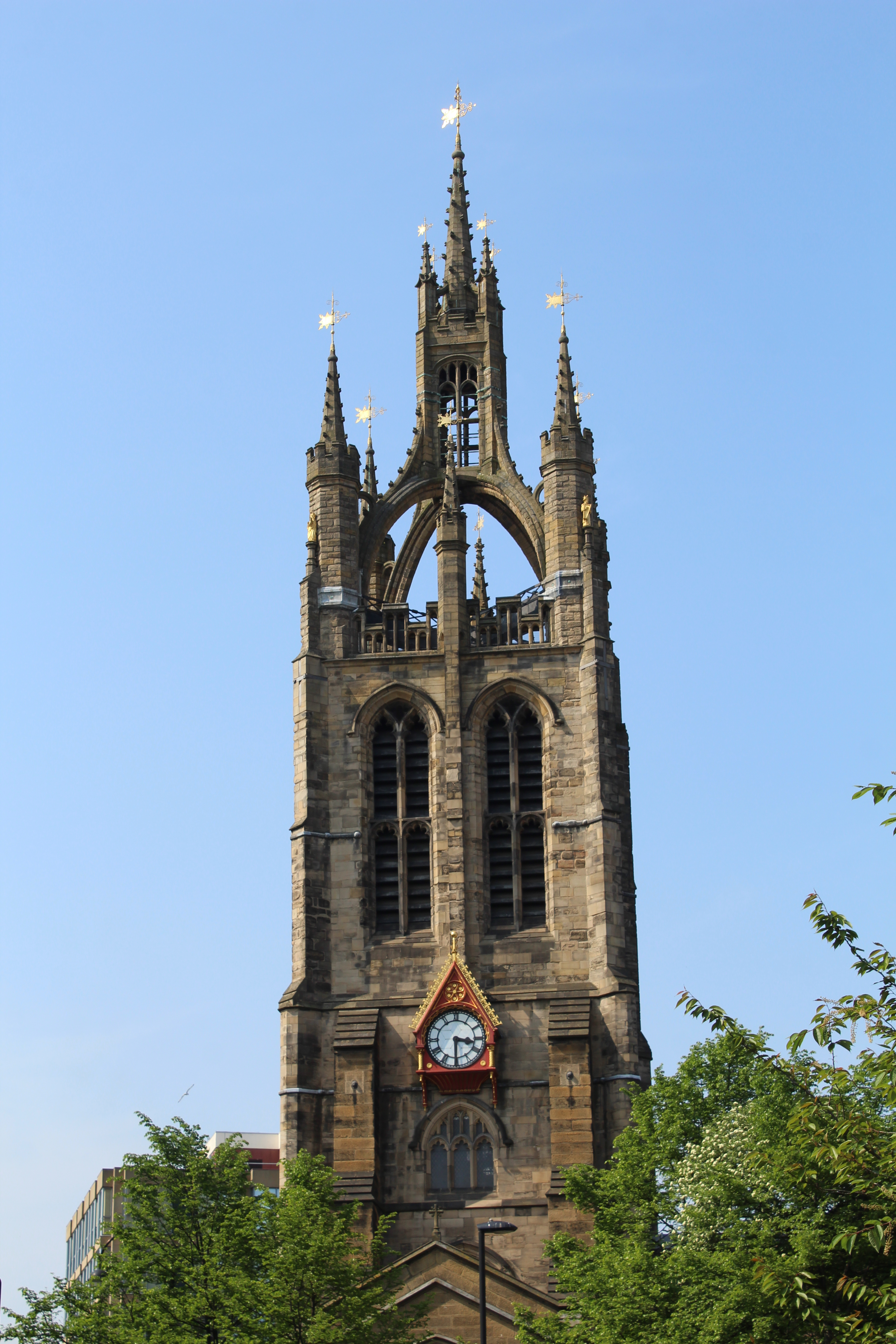
Crown spire, Newcastle Cathedral (1448)

A crown steeple, or crown spire, is a traditional form of church steeple in which curved stone flying buttresses form the open shape of a rounded crown. Crown spires first appeared in the Late Gothic church architecture in England and Scotland during the Late Middle Ages, continued to be built through the 17th century and reappeared in the late 18th century as part of the Gothic Revival.

== Gothic crown spires ==
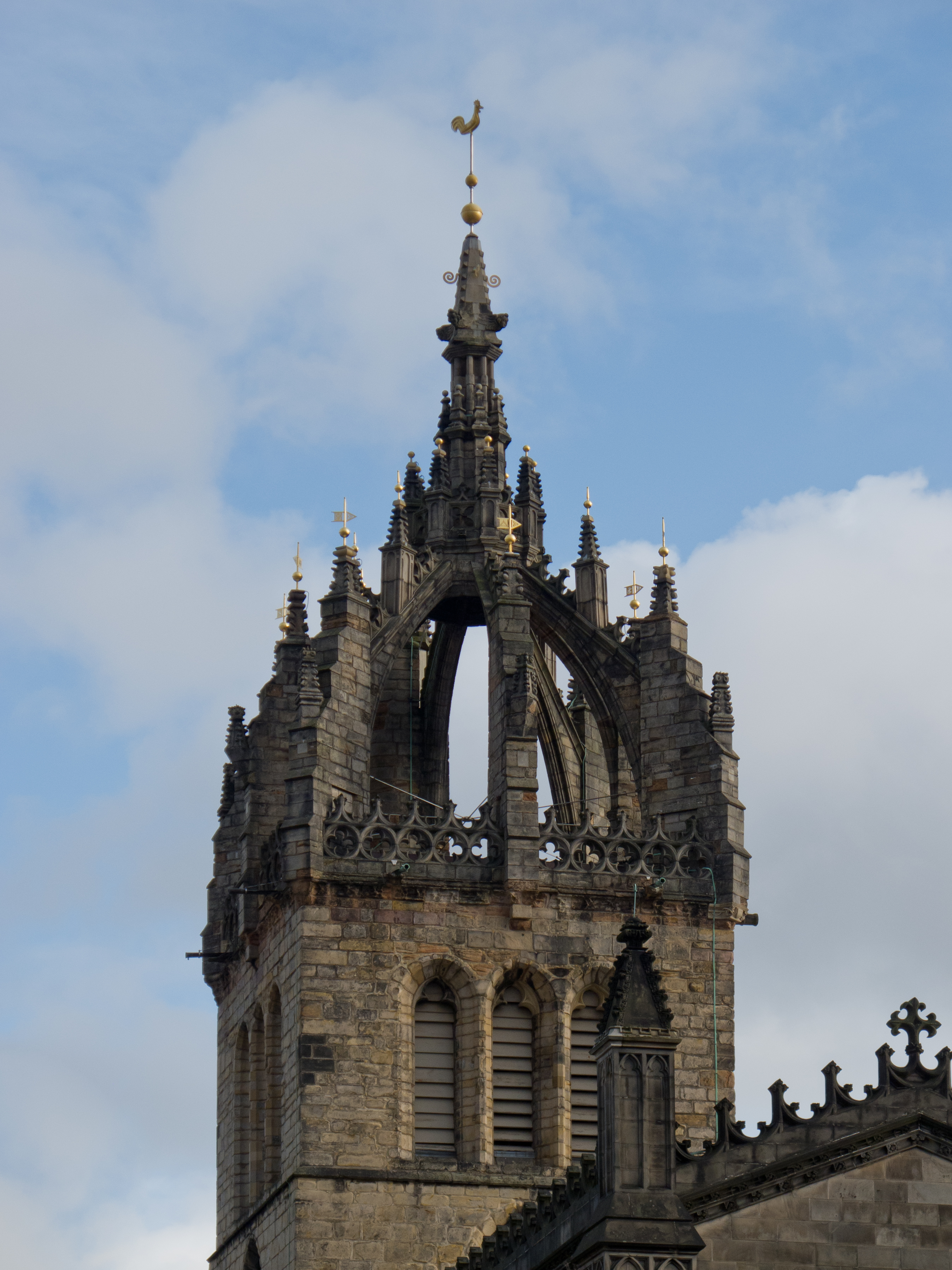
Crown steeple of St Giles' Cathedral, Edinburgh (1495)

The crown steeple on Newcastle Cathedral was erected in 1448.

The crown spire of St Giles' Cathedral, Edinburgh was erected in 1495, and rebuilt by John Mylne in 1648.

Another medieval crown steeple was built on the Chapel of King's College, Aberdeen (1500–1509), although this too was rebuilt in the 17th century, after the original blew down.

The crown steeple of the Glasgow Tolbooth, in Glasgow's Merchant City, was built in 1626–1634 by John Boyd, and at the time was the only such steeple in western Scotland.

In 1698, Sir Christopher Wren added a tower with a crown steeple to St Dunstan-in-the-East, London.

== Gothic Revival crown steeples ==
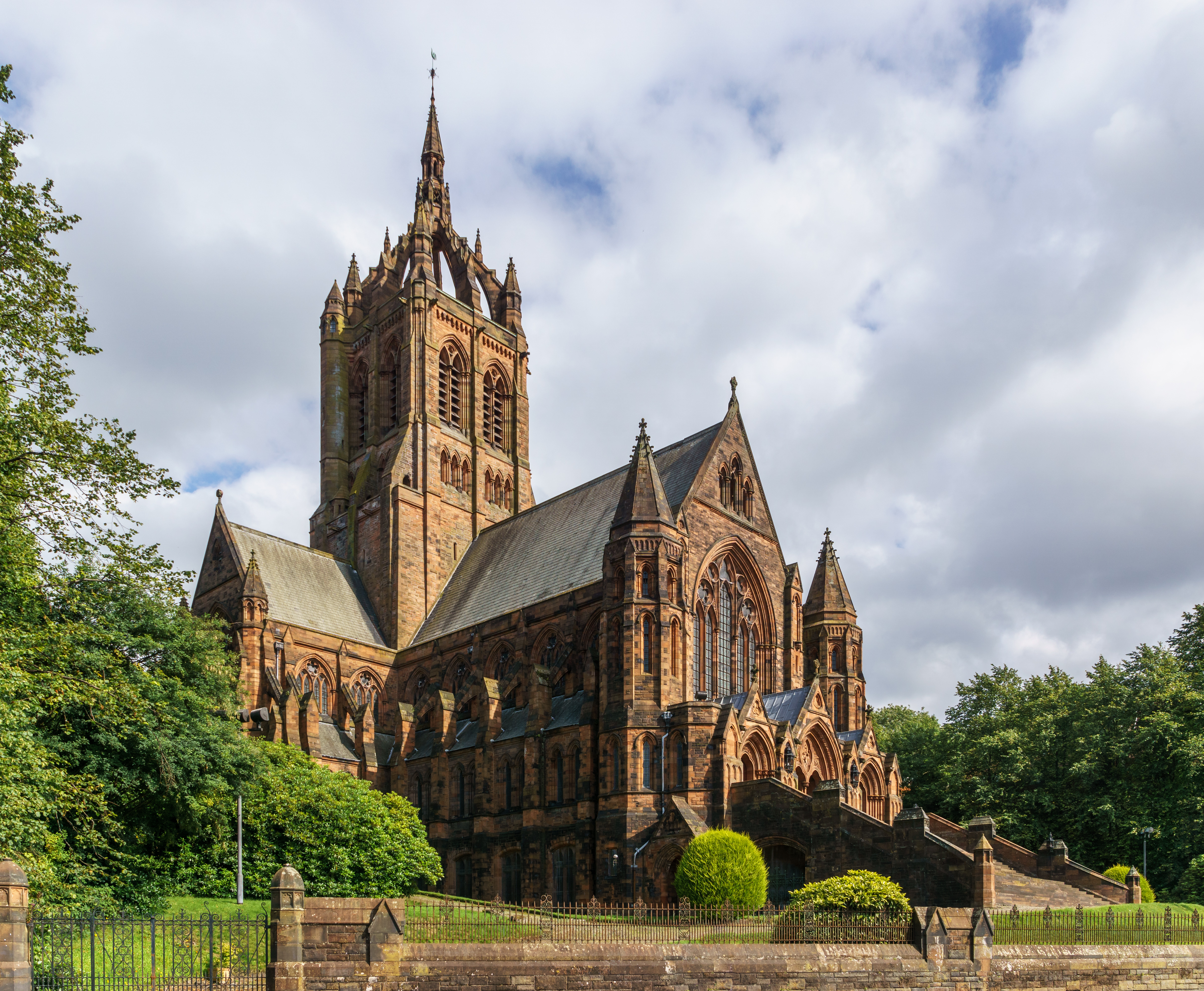
Coats Memorial Baptist Church, Paisley (1885)

Crown steeples were often incorporated into Gothic Revival churches. An octagonal bell tower with crown spire was added to St Giles' Church in Pontefract in 1790. The open spire of Faversham Parish Church, Kent was built in 1797, and a crown steeple was added to Tillington Parish Church, Sussex, in 1807.

A secular example tops the Wallace Monument, near Stirling, erected in 1869 to a design by the architect John Thomas Rochead.

Other ecclesiastical examples include those at Tarbert Parish Church Tarbert, Kintyre (1886), and the Kelvin Stevenson Memorial Church, Glasgow, by John James Stevenson (1902).

The south facade of the Victoria and Albert Museum, London, is a hybrid of Gothic and classical architectural forms, topped by a crown steeple. This part of the building was designed by Aston Webb, and completed in 1909.

== Modern versions ==
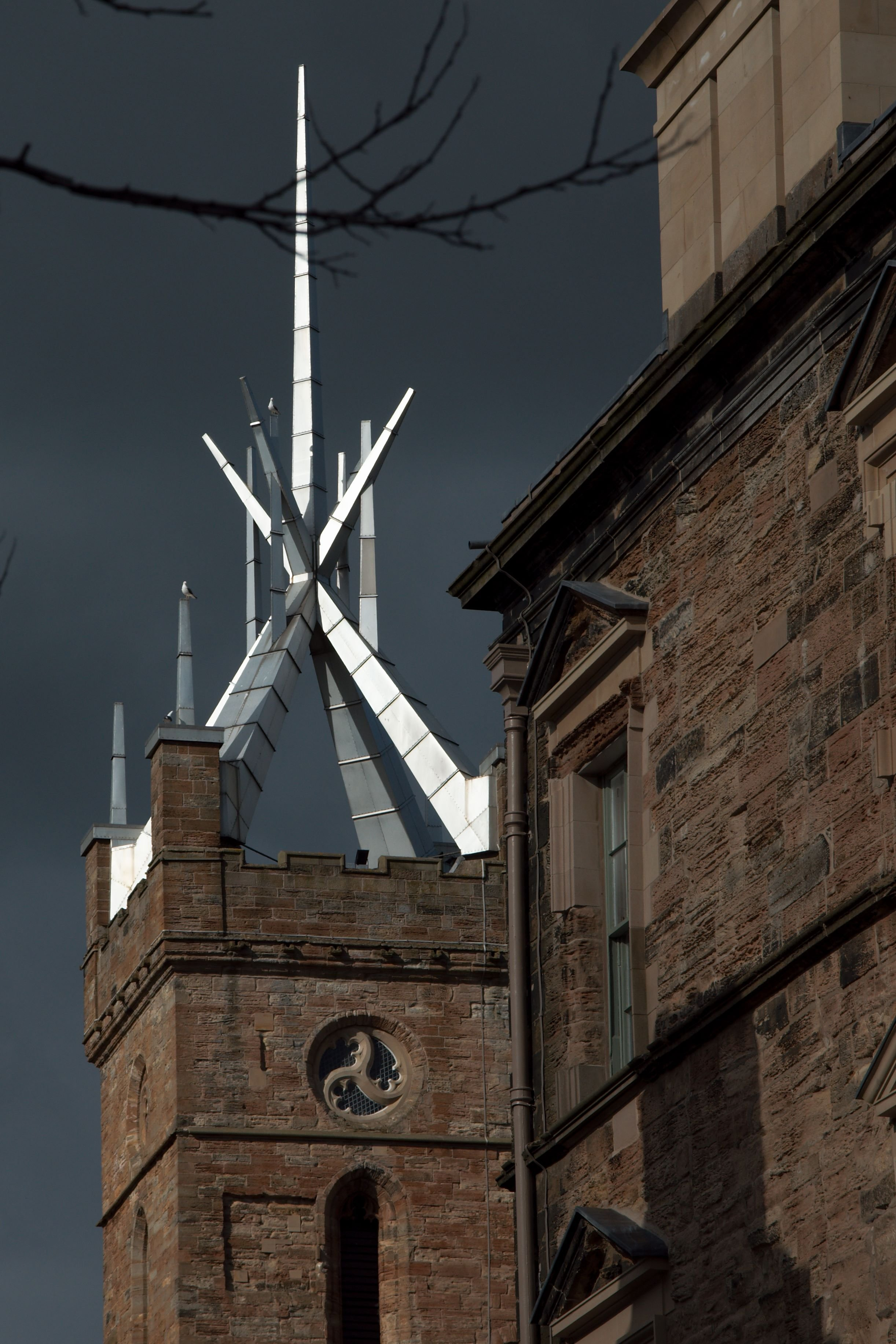
Crown steeple of St Michael's Parish Church, Linlithgow (1964)

One of the most recent examples is at St Michael's Parish Church in Linlithgow where an aluminium crown spire was added in 1964. This replaced an historic crown steeple whose weight had begun to threaten the integrity of the tower. This was illustrated in Slezer's view of Linlithgow Palace.

A crown spire was proposed for the long-unfinished crossing of Westminster Abbey, scheduled to be completed in time for the Diamond Jubilee of Elizabeth II in 2013. Nothing came of it.
