= Tarbert Parish Church =

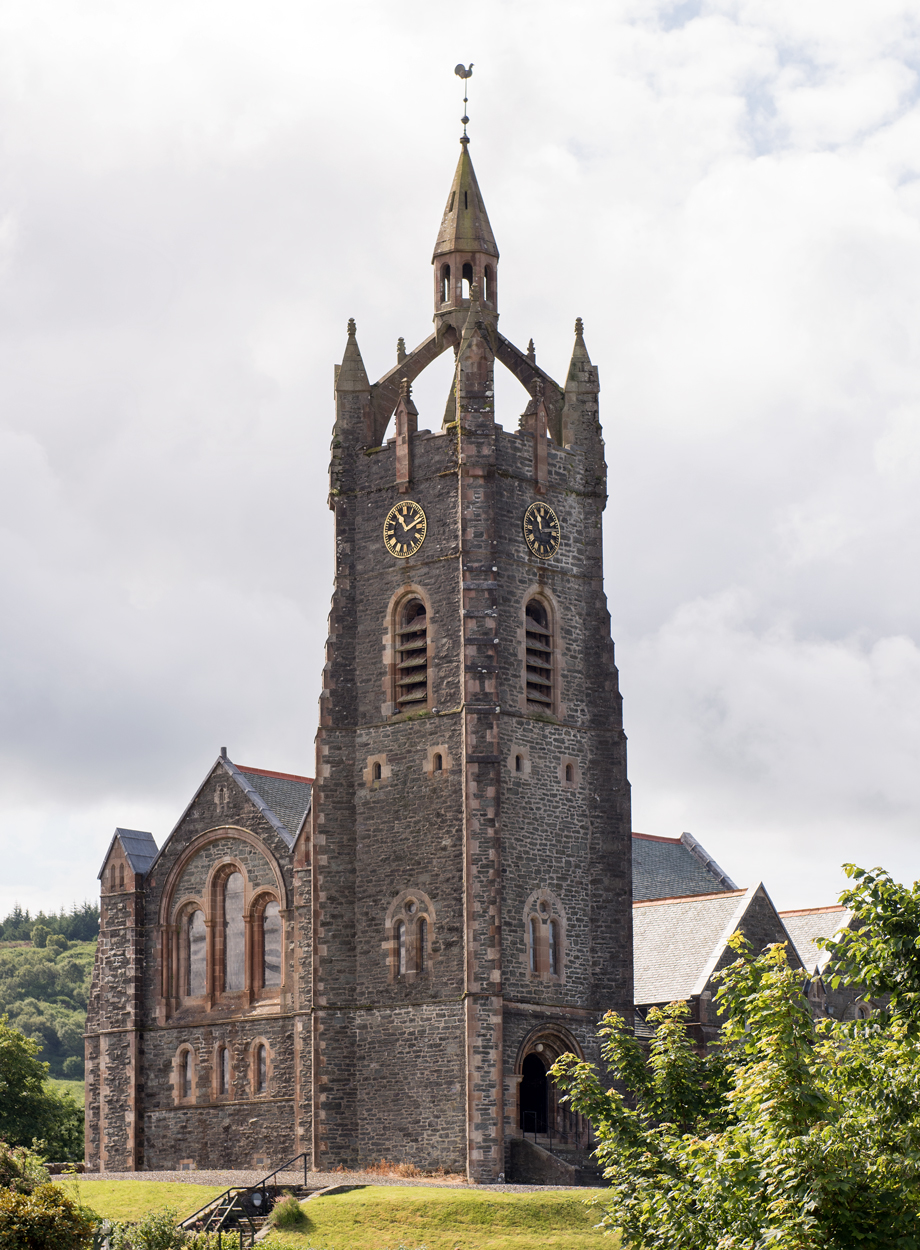
- Tarbert Parish Church
- Tarbert Parish Church
- 55°51′45.68″N 5°25′1.96″W
- Location: Tarbert, Kintyre
- Country: Scotland
- Denomination: Church of Scotland

History
- Status: Parish church

Architecture
- Functional status: Active
- Heritage designation: Category B listed building
- Designated: 28 August 1980
- Architect(s): McKissack & Rowan
- Style: Gothic Revivial
- Groundbreaking: 17 October 1885
- Completed: 8 August 1886
- Construction cost: £3,400 (equivalent to £382,100 in 2025)

Specifications
- Capacity: 600 persons

Administration
- Parish: Tarbert, Loch Fyne and Kilberry

Tarbert Parish Church is a Category B listed building in Tarbert, Kintyre, Argyll and Bute.

== History ==
The first church building, a mission chapel, was established in 1775. This was later expanded into a T-plan kirk which had a bellcoted gabled wing added in 1841-42. A separate parish was established in 1864.

However, by the 1880s this no longer met the needs of the parish and a new church was planned. The foundation stone was laid on 17 October 1885 by William Graham of North Erines.

The design comprised a nave, with aisle and transept on the north and a gallery on the east. The style was Norman Gothic with accommodation for 600 persons. The pews were stained in walnut and varnished, the lower portion of the walls was laid off in ashlar, the upper portion decorated with bands and stencilled ornaments, and the roof stained in shades with star ornaments. The octagonal pulpit was stained with gilt decoration. The moveable book board was of ecclesiastical brass. The building was heated with hot-water pipes and the windows glazed with tinted cathedral glass. The construction also included a hall with accommodation for 80 people, a session house and a vestry. The tower had a base of 16 feet (4.9 m) square rising to a hight of 110 feet (34 m) from the pavement, finished with a crown with flying butresses, surmounted with a gilt weather cock and lightening protector.

It was opened for worship on 8 August 1886.

== Clock and bell ==
A clock by Gillett & Co of London and the bell of 0.6 long tons (610 kg) 40 inches (1.0 m) in diameter set on G by Munro Thompson & Co were installed in the tower.
