= Charles Groves (cricketer) =

Scottish cricketer

Personal information
- Full name: Charles Groves
- Born: 13 January 1896; Leith, Midlothian, Scotland
- Died: 13 June 1949 (aged 53); Danby, Yorkshire, England
- Batting: Right-handed
- Bowling: Right-arm medium

Domestic team information
- Years: Team
- 1923–1928: Scotland

Career statistics
Competition	First-class
Matches	4
Runs scored	150
Batting average	18.75
100s/50s	–/1
Top score	64
Balls bowled	582
Wickets	9
Bowling average	31.55
5 wickets in innings	–
10 wickets in match	–
Best bowling	3/83
Catches/stumpings	1/–
- Source: Cricinfo, 30 October 2022

Charles Groves (13 January 1896 – 14 December 1969) was a Scottish first-class cricketer.

Groves was born at Leith in December 1896 and was educated in Edinburgh at George Heriot's School. He served in the First World War, enlisting as a private in the 5th Royal Scots. He gained the commissioned rank of second lieutenant in November 1916, with promotion to lieutenant following in April 1918. He saw action during the war on the Western Front and the Gallipoli campaign. A club cricketer for Heriot's Former Pupils, he made his debut for Scotland in first-class cricket against Surrey at Glasgow in 1923. He made three further first-class appearances for Scotland, against Wales in 1924, Lancashire in 1925, and Ireland in 1928. Playing as an all-rounder in the Scottish side, Groves scored 150 runs in his four matches at an average of 18.75; he made one half century score of 64. With his right-arm medium pace bowling, he took 9 wickets at a bowling average of 31.55, with best figures of 3 for 83. Groves died in December 1969 in England at Danby, Yorkshire.
