= Tom Black (cricketer) =

Scottish cricketer and educator

Personal information
- Full name: Thomas MacMillan Black
- Born: 7 February 1956 (age 70); Greenock, Renfrewshire, Scotland
- Batting: Right-handed
- Bowling: Right-arm medium

Domestic team information
- Years: Team
- 1979–1985: Scotland

Career statistics
Competition	First-class	List A
Matches	1	5
Runs scored	88	83
Batting average	44.00	16.60
100s/50s	–/1	–/–
Top score	57	38
Balls bowled	0	54
Wickets	–	2
Bowling average	–	25.50
5 wickets in innings	–	–
10 wickets in match	–	–
Best bowling	–	2/34
Catches/stumpings	2/–	1/–
- Source: Cricinfo, 14 June 2022

Thomas MacMillan Black (born 7 February 1956) is a Scottish former first-class cricketer and educator.

Black was born at Greenock in February 1956. He was educated at the Ardrossan Academy, before going up to Jordanhill College. A club cricketer for Greenock Cricket Club, he made his debut for Scotland in a first-class cricket match against Ireland at Dublin in 1979. Batting twice in the match, he was dismissed in the Scotland first innings for 31 runs by Dermott Monteith, while in their second innings he was dismissed for 57 runs by Michael Halliday, the highest score of the innings. The following year he made his debut in List A one-day cricket against Nottinghamshire in the 1980 Benson & Hedges Cup, with Black making a further appearance in the tournament against Lancashire. His next appearances for Scotland came in the 1985 Benson & Hedges Cup, with him making three further one-day appearances during the tournament. In his five one-day matches, Black scored 83 runs with a highest score of 38, while with his right-arm medium pace bowling he took 2 wickets. In club cricket, he was a captain of Greenock Cricket Club.

In the late 1970s, Black was being scouted by English county Kent. However, he was seriously injured in a car accident in 1979, breaking his back in two places. This put paid to a move into county cricket. In June 2009, he was found guilty of dangerous driving having been caught speeding at 110 miles per hour (180 km/h) in his Porsche; Greenock Sheriff Court banned Black from driving for three months and fined him £500. Outside of cricket, Black worked as a physical education teacher at Wellington Academy.
