= June Andrews =

Scottish academic

Professor June Andrews, OBE FRCN FCGI , is a Scottish psychiatric nurse who is an expert in dementia studies and aged care. She was the professor of dementia studies at the Dementia Services Development Centre at the University of Stirling. She is now Professor Emeritus. She has written widely on dementia, care homes and geriatric care.

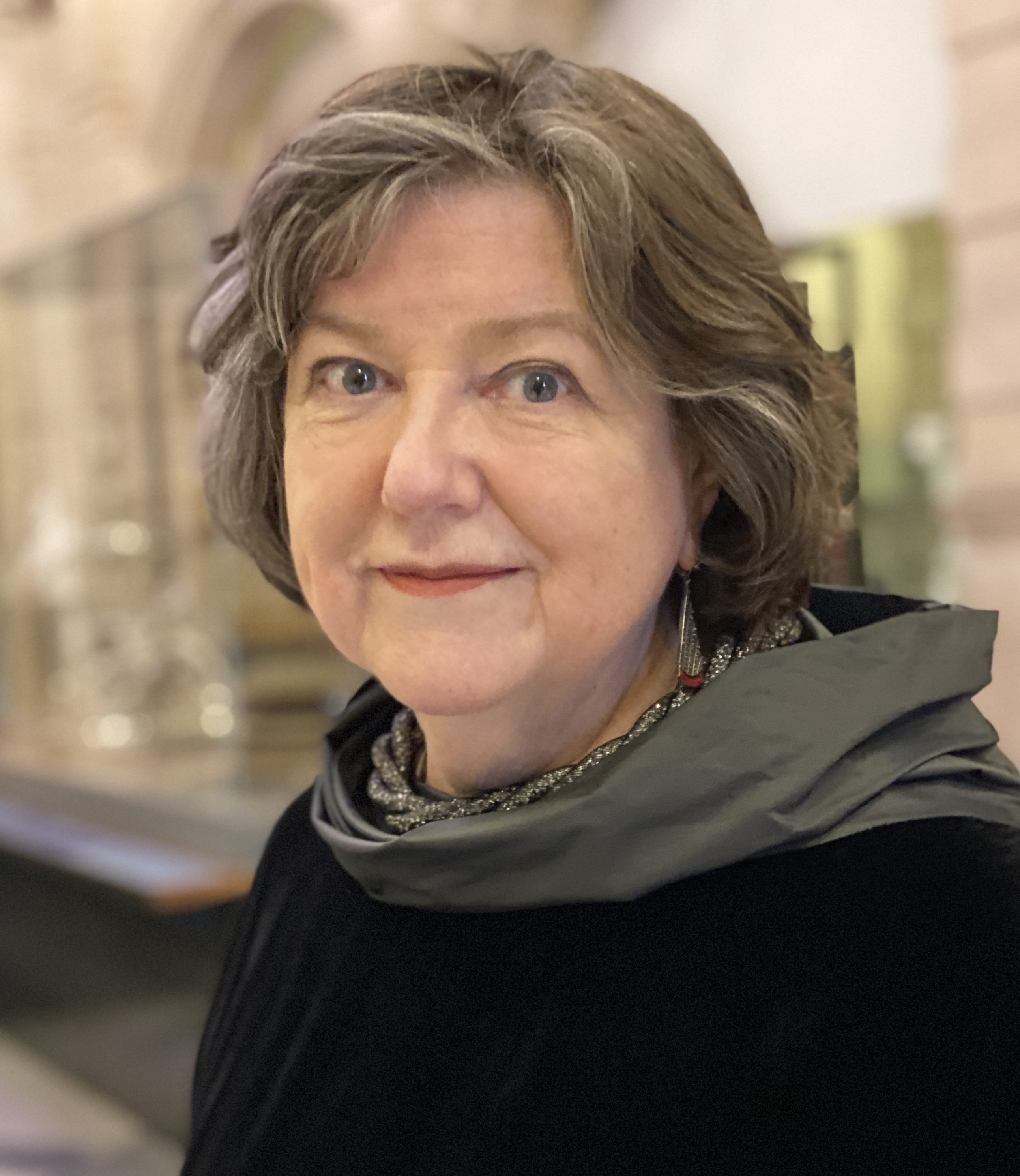

== Biography ==
Andrews attended Ardrossan Academy and undertook an honours degree in philosophy and English literature at the University of Glasgow. In 2020, she completed a law degree LLB at the University of Edinburgh.

She began her nursing career at Mapperley Hospital and the Queens Medical Centre, Nottingham and qualified as a psychiatric and general nurse while studying for a post-graduate degree in American studies. Her clinical nursing posts in the NHS in England were in the care of older people, and she became a regular contributor to nursing journals and conferences on ethical issues related to later life.

From 1992 to 1999, she was the Scottish Board Secretary of the Royal College of NursingIn 1999, she was appointed as Director of Nursing at NHS Forth Valley. From 2002 to 2007, she was a senior civil servant, serving as the Director of the Centre for Change and Innovation (CCI) in the Scottish Government. The purpose of the CCI was to foster improvements in delivering health care, including cancer, diabetes, depression, and operational issues such as waiting times. In 2010, in Philadelphia, Andrews was presented with the Founders Award of the British American Project, of which she is a Fellow and was a member of the Advisory Board. The British American Project is a leadership network celebrating and encouraging the transatlantic relationship. In 2011, the Royal College of Nursing and Nursing Standard awarded her the Robert Tiffany International prize for promoting evidence-based improvement in dementia care around the world.

She was awarded a Lifetime Achievement Award from the four Chief Nurses of the UK at the Nursing Times Awards in 2012, and was recognised by the Health Service Journal as being one of the top 100 influential clinical leaders in England and the top 50 inspirational women in the UK in 2013. In 2014, she was awarded the Fellowship of the Royal College of Nursing, an award given to UK registered nurses who have made an exceptional contribution to the advancement of nursing and health care as a profession.

Andrews co-authored Trusted to Care, an independent report on the care of frail older people in general hospitals in Wales, which gave rise to an immediate review of the care of elderly patients at all Welsh hospitals

Andrews co-authored Ten Helpful Hints for Carers of People with Dementia, which has sold 65,000 copies, and the book, The One-Stop Guide to Dementia; Practical Advice for Families, Professionals, and People Living with Dementia and Alzheimer's Disease, published by Profile Books in February 2015 and has been followed by editions in North America (When Someone You Know Has Dementia) and an international edition (Dementia What You Need To Know) published 2016. She has since written a book about choosing a care home for families (Care Homes: When, Why and How to choose a Care Home). Additionally, Dementia, the One-Stop Guide has been published in a second edition.

Andrews was appointed Officer of the Order of the British Empire (OBE) in the 2016 Birthday Honours for services to people with dementia.

In March 2020, Andrews faced criticism from Age Scotland in the media for asking a Scottish Parliament public audit committee if a UK coronavirus pandemic could be "quite useful" to the government by reducing the older population through the death of hospital bed blockers to ease pressure on the NHS. Media reports offered no deeper discussion of the true meaning of the remarks, which were intended to draw attention to structural issues arising from years of government underfunding in social care, even after Andrews clarified the matter, as revealed in a subsequent academic review of UK media coverage of the COVID-19 pandemic.Carney, Gemma (2022). "'Oldies come bottom of grim reaper hierarchy' : A framing analysis of UK newspaper coverage of old age and risk of dying during the first wave of the COVID-19 pandemic". Journal of Social Policy: 1–22. doi:10.1017/S0047279422000708.
