= Hamish More =

Scottish cricketer (1940–2022)

Personal information
- Full name: Hamish Keith More
- Born: 30 May 1940; Abbeyhill, Edinburgh, Scotland
- Died: 2 January 2022 (aged 81); Edinburgh, Scotland
- Batting: Right-handed
- Role: Wicketkeeper-batsman

Domestic team information
- Years: Team
- 1966–1980: Scotland

Career statistics
Competition	First-class	List A
Matches	18	3
Runs scored	639	32
Batting average	18.79	32.00
100s/50s	0/2	0/0
Top score	89	16*
Catches/stumpings	30/2	0/–
- Source: ESPNcricinfo, 4 March 2017

Hamish Keith More (30 May 1940 – 2 January 2022) was a Scottish cricketer who represented Scotland in first-class cricket from 1966 to 1976 and in List A cricket in 1980.

More was born in Edinburgh and educated at George Heriot's School. A right-handed batsman and wicket-keeper, he made his highest first-class score against Surrey in 1969, when he opened the second innings and scored 89 out of a team total of 166. Against the touring Pakistan national team in 1971 he set a Scottish catching record that still stands when he took seven catches in the match, six of them off the spin bowling of Jimmy Allan.

More toured Bangladesh with MCC in 1978–79. In all, he played more than 350 games for MCC. After retiring from league cricket at the age of 53 he played midweek and Sunday matches for various teams till his seventies.

More had a son and a daughter. He died in Edinburgh on 2 January 2022, at the age of 81.
