= Ardrossan Academy =

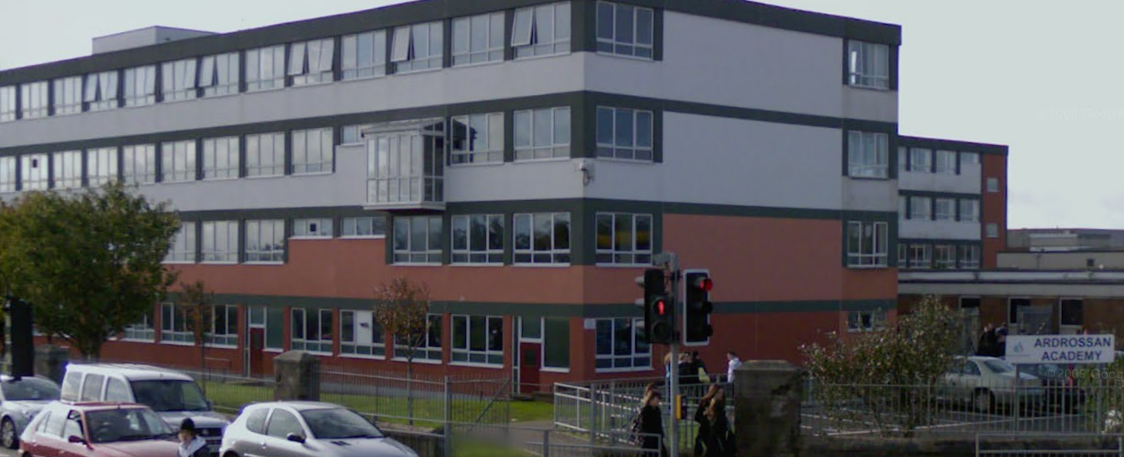
- Modern build of Ardrossan Academy

Location
- Sorbie Road; Ardrossan, North Ayrshire, KA22 8AR; Scotland; 55.6447°N 4.7997°W

Information
- Type: Non-denominational secondary school
- Motto: Ad Astra (To the stars)
- Established: October 1882; 143 years ago
- Local authority: North Ayrshire Council
- Head teacher: Anne Anderson
- Years: S1 to S6
- Gender: Co–educational, boys and girls
- Age: 11 to 18
- Enrolment: 743 (2024)
- Houses: Nevis, Lomond, Annick, Barra
- Website: www.ardrossanandwinton.co.uk

Ardrossan Academy is an 11–18 secondary school operated by North Ayrshire Council, located in Ardrossan, North Ayrshire, Scotland, which opened in October 1882. As of November 2025, the current Head Teacher of the school is Anne Anderson, who additionally serves as Campus Head of nearby Winton Primary School & Early Years Class. The school had an enrolment of 743 pupils in 2024.

== Catchment ==
It serves the town of Ardrossan, with pupils also coming from nearby Saltcoats, West Kilbride, Seamill, Fairlie, Largs and other areas.

== Ardrossan Community Campus ==
An inspection of Ardrossan Academy conducted by North Ayrshire Council in 2018 found that the facilities and structure at Ardrossan Academy to be rated as "D", meaning "economic life expired and/or risk of failure". As a result, North Ayrshire Council allocated £31.5 million towards the costs associated with a replacement for Ardrossan Academy, advocating that a new facility with updated equipment was a "much needed replacement" for Ardrossan Academy.

In 2020, North Ayrshire Council applied to the Scottish Government for permission to close both Ardrossan Academy and Winton Primary School in order to merge both schools into a single site educational campus. The Scottish Government formally approved North Ayrshire Council's plans in June 2020. The new 2–18 campus will incorporate Ardrossan Academy, Winton Primary School & Early Years Class, the Astra base for pupils with Additional Support Needs, as well as several community facilities including swimming pool and library, and is projected to cost £80 million. The new campus will include space for 1,200 pupils within Ardrossan Academy.

The site chosen for the new campus is a former Shell oil refinery site, and is expected to be completed in 2027 following extensive site remediation and preparation works. The campus was initially expected to open in 2026, however, delays to remediation and site preparation works resulted in a push back.

== Notable alumni ==
- June Andrews, nursing expert, director of NHS Scotland Centre for Change and Innovation, professor of dementia studies at University of Stirling
- Tom Black, cricketer
- Peter Duncan, MP, chairman of the Scottish Conservative Party
- Sir William Barr McKinnon Duncan, chief executive of Rolls-Royce
- Janice Galloway, writer (The Trick is to Keep Breathing, etc.)
- William Hilton, MP, trade unionist, director general of the Federation of Master Builders
- Roy Howat, internationally renowned French music scholar and performer
- Gordon Jackson QC, former MSP, lawyer
- Edith MacArthur, actress
- Iain McNicol, General Secretary, Labour Party

== Notable staff ==
- John Watt Butters (1863–1946), mathematician, was Rector 1899–1928
- John Aitkenhead, teacher, co-founder of Kilquhanity School
- Morag Aitkenhead (Robina Roy MacKinnon), teacher, co-founder of Kilquhanity School
