= Tarbert, Kintyre =

Village in Argyll and Bute, Scotland

Coordinates: 55.863246°N 5.4156080°W

Tarbert: Scottish Gaelic: An Tairbeart, Tairbeart Loch Fìne
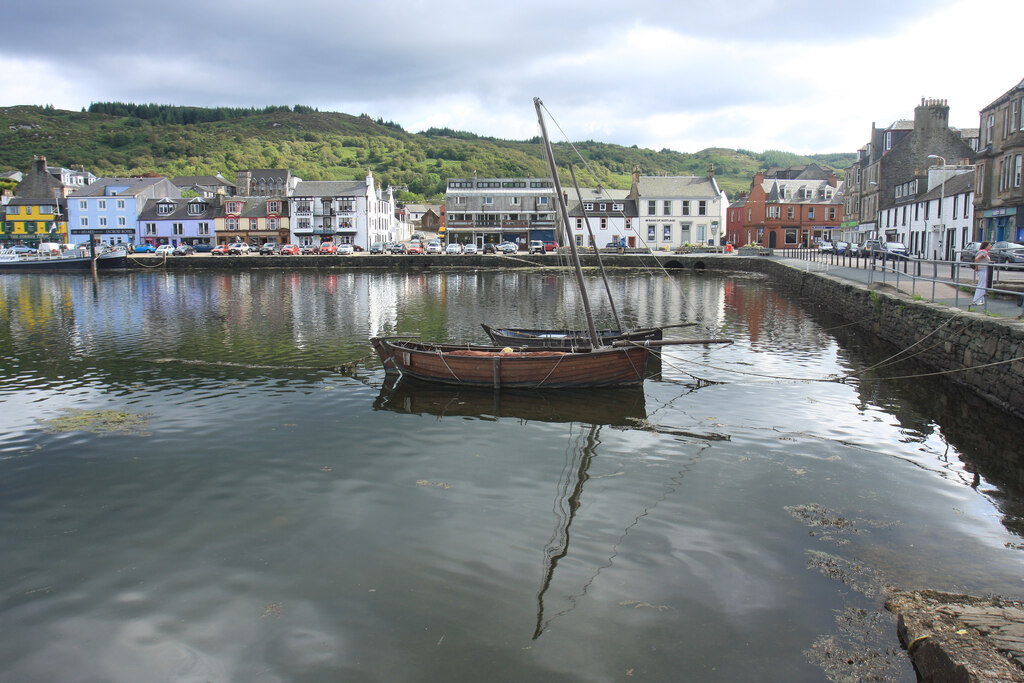
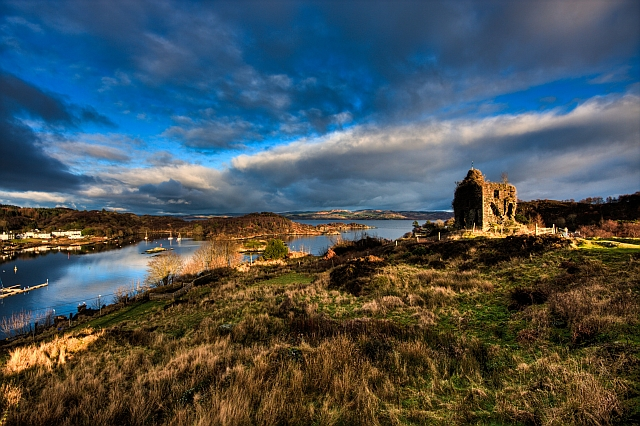
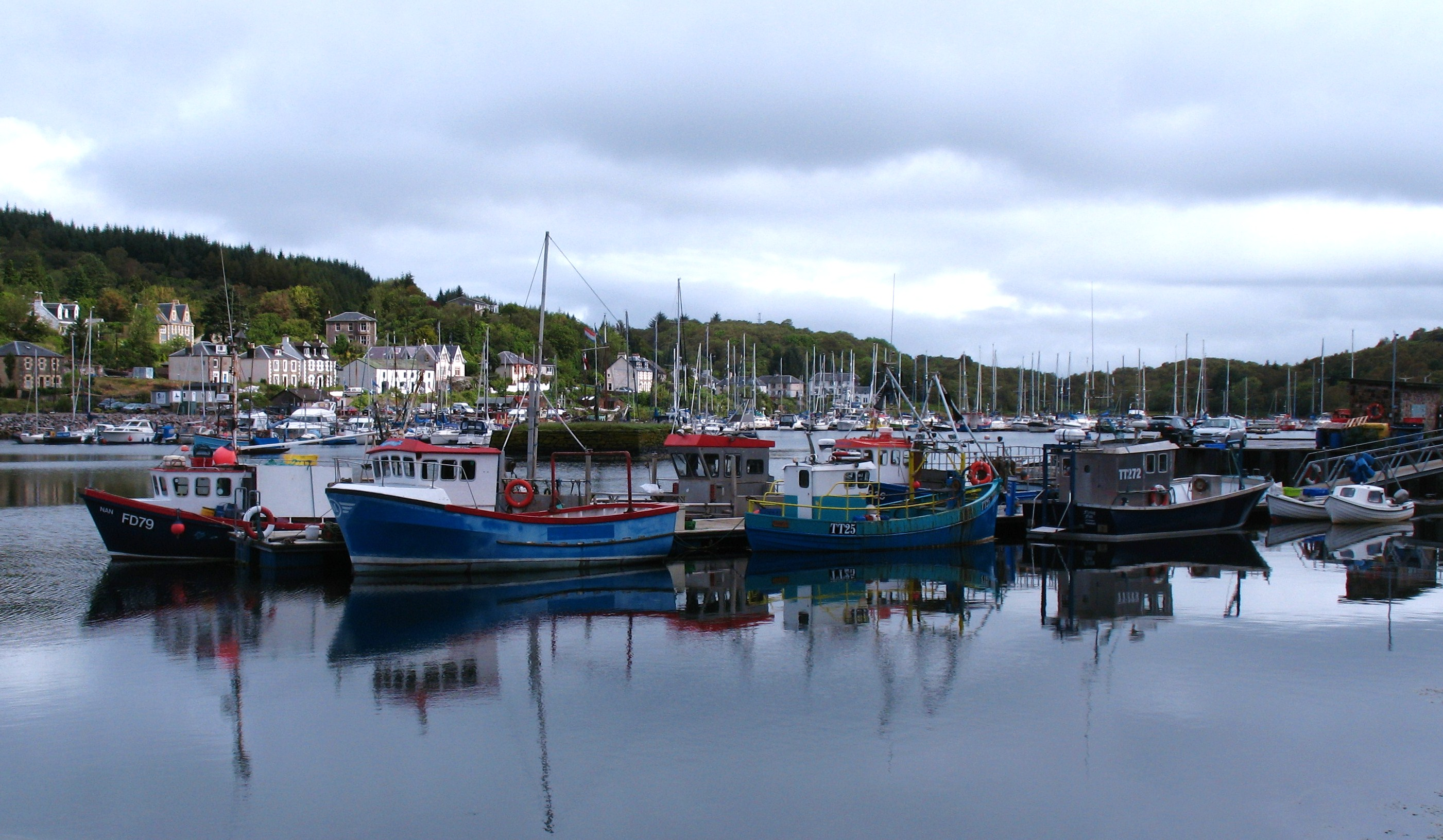
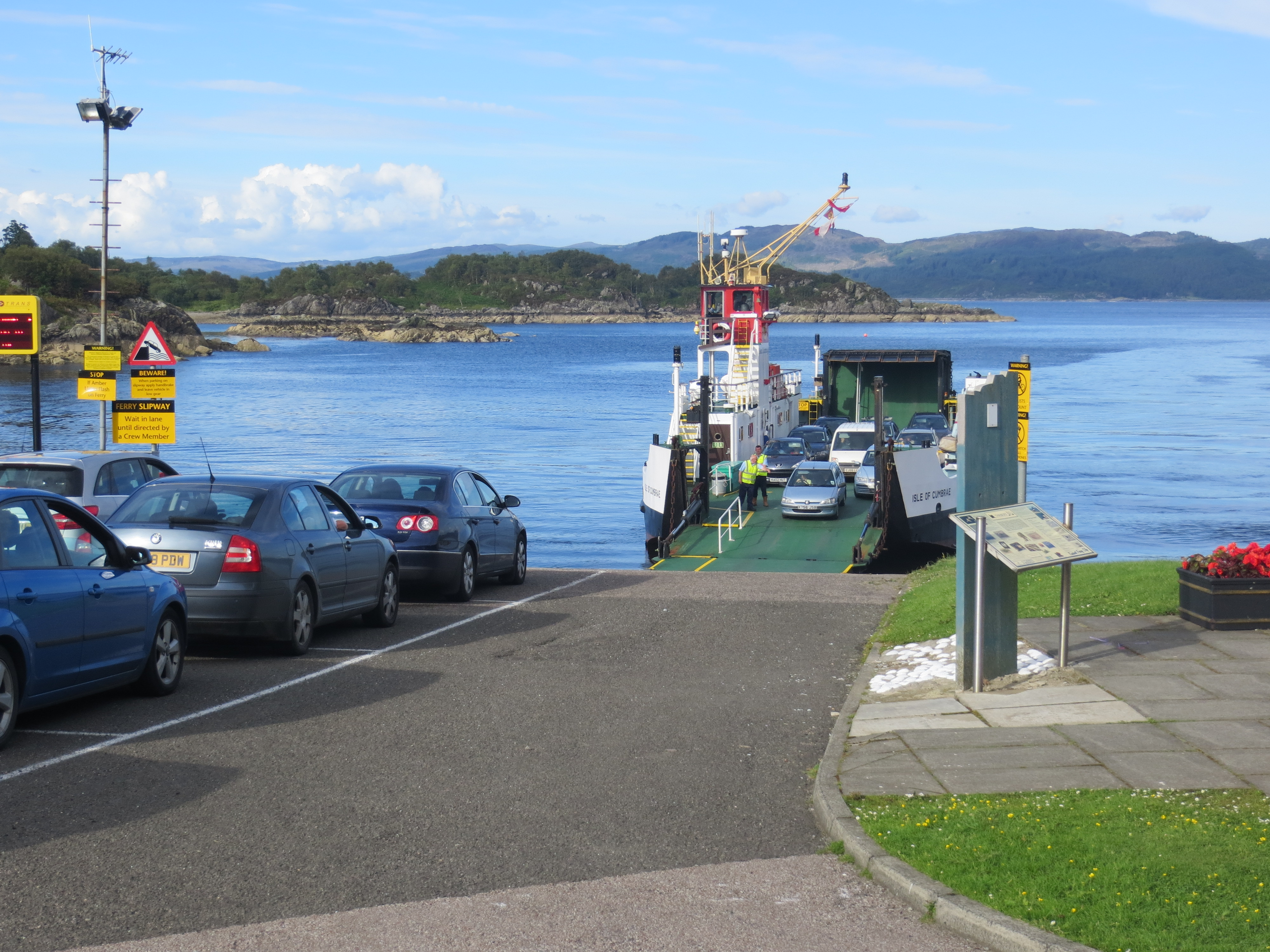
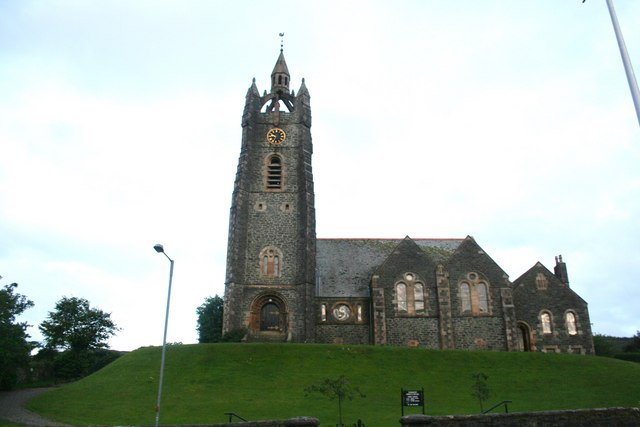
- Tarbert Harbour East Loch Tarbert and Tarbert Castle Tarbert Marina Tarbert Ferry Port Tarbert Parish Church

- Location within Argyll and Bute
- Population: 1,120 (2020)
- OS grid reference: NR 86363 68617
  - Edinburgh: 86 mi (138 km)
  - London: 370 mi (595 km)
- Council area: Argyll and Bute
- Lieutenancy area: Argyll and Bute
- Country: Scotland
- Sovereign state: United Kingdom
- Post town: TARBERT
- Postcode district: PA29
- Dialling code: 01880
- UK Parliament: Argyll, Bute and South Lochaber
- Scottish Parliament: Argyll and Bute

Tarbert (Scottish Gaelic: An Tairbeart, pronounced [ən̪ˠ ˈt̪ʰaɾʲapərˠʃt̪]; more fully Tairbeart Loch Fìne "Tarbert [of] Loch Fyne" to distinguish it from other Tarberts) is a village in the west of Scotland, in the Argyll and Bute council area. It is built at the head of an inlet of Loch Fyne called East Loch Tarbert, on a narrow isthmus which connects Kintyre to the south with Knapdale to the north and separates East Loch Tarbert from the much longer West Loch Tarbert which leads to the Sound of Jura and the Atlantic. Tarbert had a recorded population of 1,338 in the 2001 Census.

Tarbert has a long history both as a harbour and as a strategic point guarding access to Kintyre and the Inner Hebrides. The name Tarbert is an anglicised form of the Gaelic word tairbeart, which literally translates as "carrying across" and refers to the narrowest strip of land between two bodies of water over which goods or entire boats can be dragged or carried (portage). In past times cargoes were discharged from vessels berthed in one loch, hauled over the isthmus to the other loch, loaded onto vessels berthed there and shipped onward, allowing seafarers to avoid the sail around the Mull of Kintyre.

Tarbert was anciently part of the Gaelic overkingdom of Dál Riata and protected by three castles – in the village centre, at the head of the West Loch, and on the south side of the East Loch. The ruin of the last of these castles, Tarbert Castle, still exists and dominates Tarbert's skyline. Around the year 1098 Magnus Barefoot, King of Norway, is said to have had his longship dragged across the isthmus at Tarbert with the helmsman in place, to meet the agreed definition of an island, and establish his possession of Kintyre as one of the Western Isles.

Despite its distinction as a strategic stronghold during the Middle Ages, Tarbert's socioeconomic prosperity came during the Early Modern period, as the port developed into a fishing town. At its height, the Loch Fyne herring fishery attracted hundreds of vessels to Tarbert.

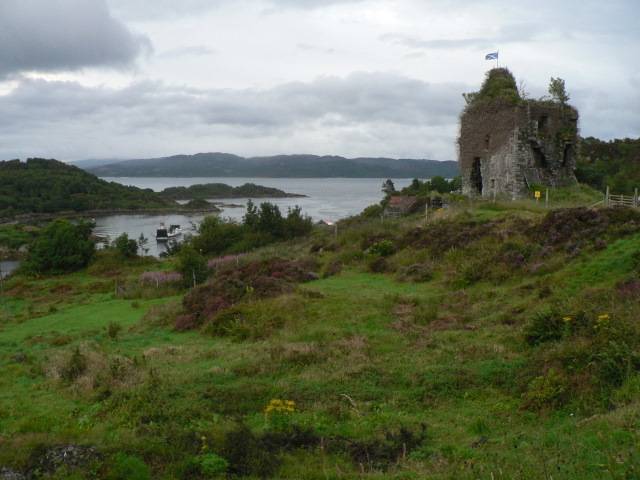
Tarbert Castle. A fortified structure was built in Tarbert during the 13th century.

== History ==
Tarbert is a name from Gaelic for a small neck of land joining two larger pieces; an isthmus, across which a birlinn (longboat or galley) could be dragged.

Tarbert was anciently part of the Gaelic overkingdom of Dál Riata. It has been suggested as a scene of an action during a conflict for the kingdom's rule between Dúngal mac Selbaig and Eochaid mac Echdach. The Annals of Ulster attest that in 731, Dúngal burnt a "Tairpert Boitir", which was most probably Tarbert and was at the time in the lands of the Cenél nGabráin.

Allegedly, around the year 1098 Magnus Barefoot, King of Norway, had his galley drawn across the isthmus at Tarbert with himself in it, to establish his claim to Kintyre as an island.

A similar story recounts that Robert the Bruce, when on his way to visit the Isles in 1315, "caused his galleys to be drawn across the isthmus of Tarbert. The King, whose exploit wrought upon the superstition of the inhabitants, having thus 'dantit the Ilis' and procured their homage," later returned to the castle. A fortified structure had been built in Tarbert during the 13th century. It was reinforced with the addition of an outer bailey and towers in the 1320s by Bruce, to protect it against the Lords of the Isles. A towerhouse was added in the 16th century, which is the most noticeable part of the remains. The castle occupies high land above Loch Fyne, providing views up East Loch Tarbert and beyond to the Firth of Clyde. This castle was captured from John MacDonald by James IV of Scotland as part of his campaign to destroy the power of the Lords of the Isles. In 1685 the castle was involved in another skirmish when Walter Campbell of Skipness Castle seized it as a stronghold for the Clan Campbell.

There are only a couple of standing walls left which have been stabilised, allowing removal of fencing and closer access for visitors. The castle is on top of a hill in Tarbert overlooking the bay. The castle has a very commanding view of the water approaches.

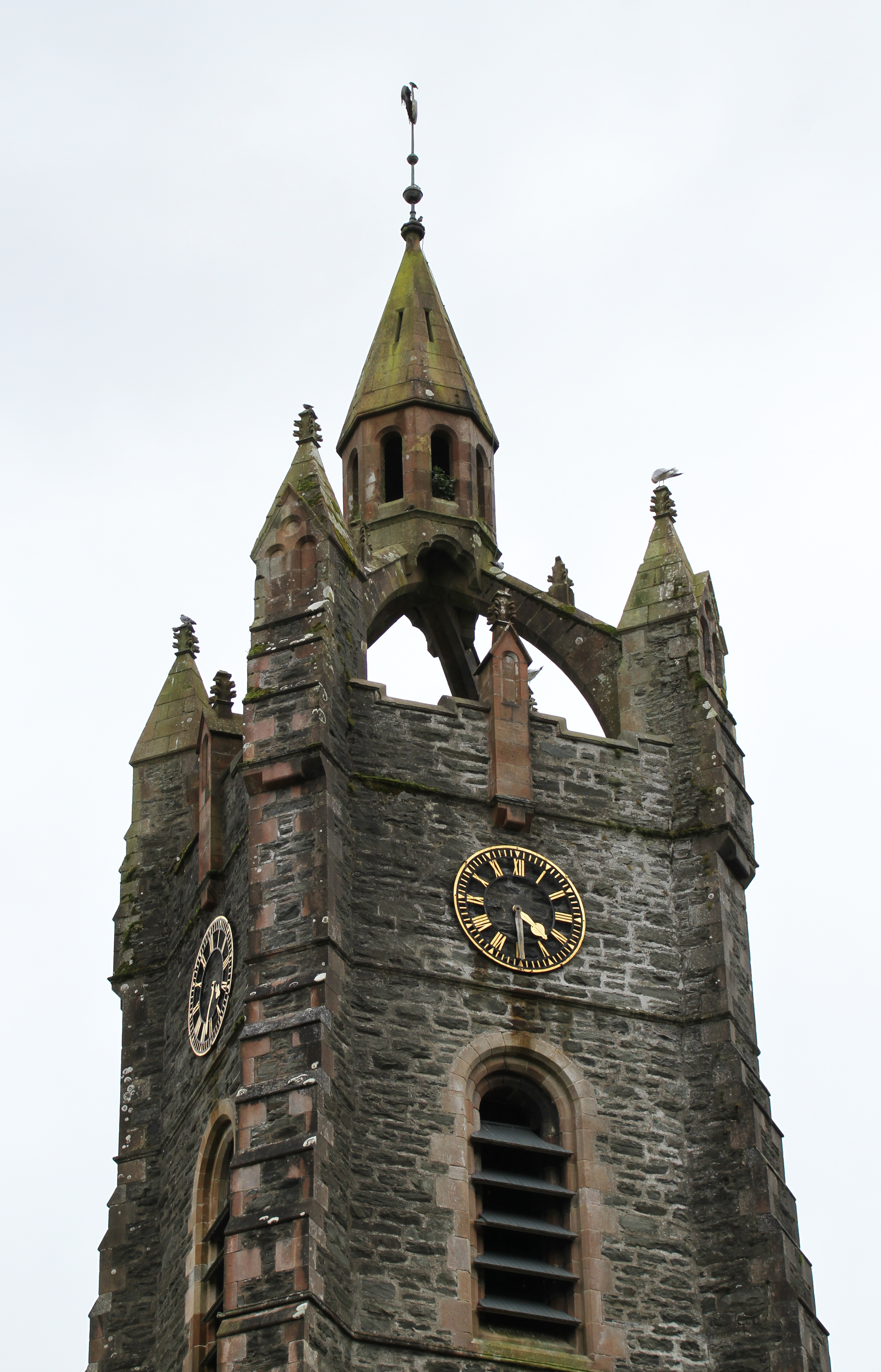
Crown spire of Tarbert parish church

== Geography ==
The coast of Tarbert Bay is rocky and the cliffs are fringed with young firs, the village itself being an extremely tranquil and beautiful place. Tarbert boasts several beaches, accessible either through forested walks or over seaside rocks. One such beach, known locally as the Shell Beach, is composed entirely of broken seashells that have washed ashore following offshore processing of queenies and clams.

The Church of Scotland parish church occupies a fine situation on high ground and has a crown spire. Overlooking the harbour are the ruins of a castle built by Robert I of Scotland in 1326. The isthmus connecting the districts of Knapdale and Kintyre is little more than 1 mile (1.6 km) wide, and boats once used to be dragged across to the head of West Loch Tarbert, a narrow sea loch nearly 10 miles (16 km) long. A proposal to cut a canal across to shorten the sail to Islay and Jura in the late 19th century did not progress further.

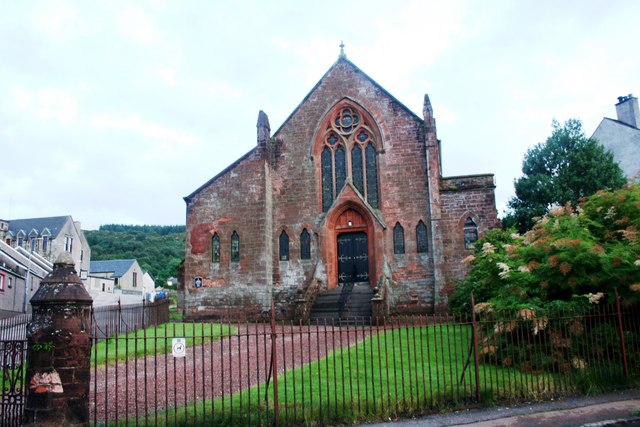
Tarbert Free Church

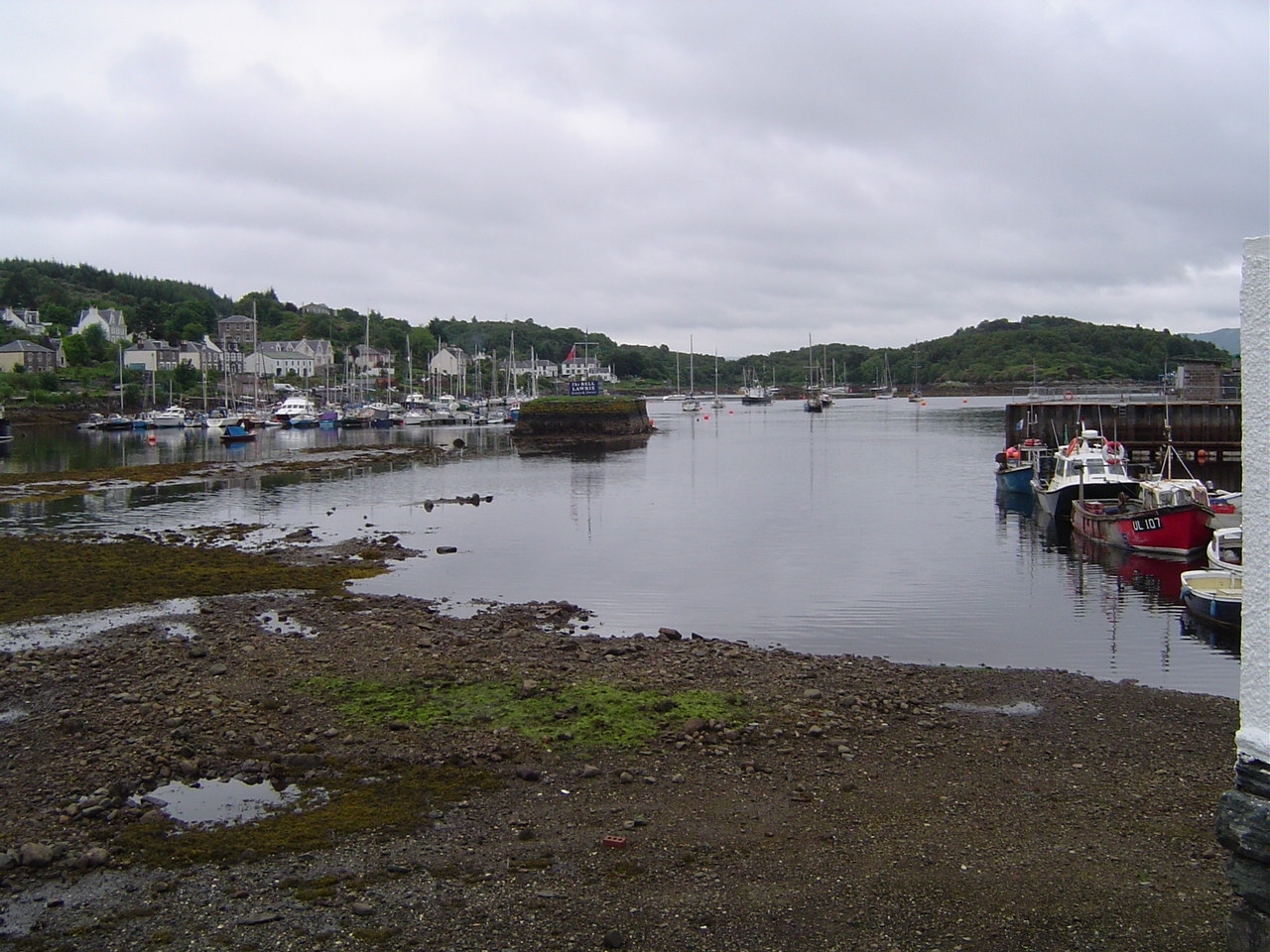
Tarbert Harbour

== Sport and recreation ==
=== National Cycle Route 75 ===
Tarbert is the start;finish point of the NCR75 a route from Tarbert to Edinburgh via Glasgow. The National Cycle Network is maintained by sustrans. NCR75 includes two ferry crossings from Tarbert to Portavadie on the Cowal peninsula and from Dunoon ((Cowal)), to Gourock in Inverclyde. Once on the Kintyre peninsula you can join the National Cycle Route 78 (The Caledonia Way).

=== Kintyre Way ===
The village is one of the start/finish points of the Kintyre Way, one of Scotland's Great Trails.

== Tourism ==
Tarbert is famous for its seafood and hosts a seafood festival every year. In addition to the Seafood Festival, Tarbert also plays host to the Scottish Series, which usually takes place in the last weeks of May every year. This yacht race is the second biggest in Britain and is surpassed only by the Cowes Week. At its peak, the village is swelled by visiting yachtsmen and their yachts.

Tarbert also hosts an annual amusement fair at the end of July. Begun in the early 1800s, Tarbert Fair was originally a place where farmers and crofters would barter cattle, wool, and other goods. Today, however, the Fair is all about entertainment, with a suite of fairground rides, arcades, and fast food outlets that stretch along the harbour walls.

== Governance ==
Tarbert is represented by several tiers of elected government. Tarbert has a representative, which it shares with North & West Kintyre, on the Argyll and Bute Council, and a community council and community trust shared with the hamlet of Skipness. Tarbert and Skipness Community Council forms the lowest tier of government whose statutory role is to communicate local opinion to local and central government. It is one of 60 community councils of the Argyll and Bute council area. Argyll and Bute Council, the unitary local authority for Tarbert, is based at Lochgilphead, and is the executive, deliberative and legislative body responsible for local government. The Scottish Parliament is responsible for devolved matters such as education, health and justice, while reserved matters are dealt with by the Parliament of the United Kingdom.

Tarbert anciently formed part of the Dál Riata. It has lain within the county boundaries of Argyllshire from a very early time. In 1890, Tarbert fell under the authority of Argyll County Council, where it remained until 1975 when the county was superseded by the regional council area of Strathclyde. From 1975 to 1996, Tarbert was in the Argyll district of Strathclyde until the two-tier regions and districts of Scotland were abolished. Since 1996 it has formed part of the unitary Argyll and Bute council area; Argyll and Bute Council is the local authority. Tarbert remains part of Argyllshire for purposes of registration.

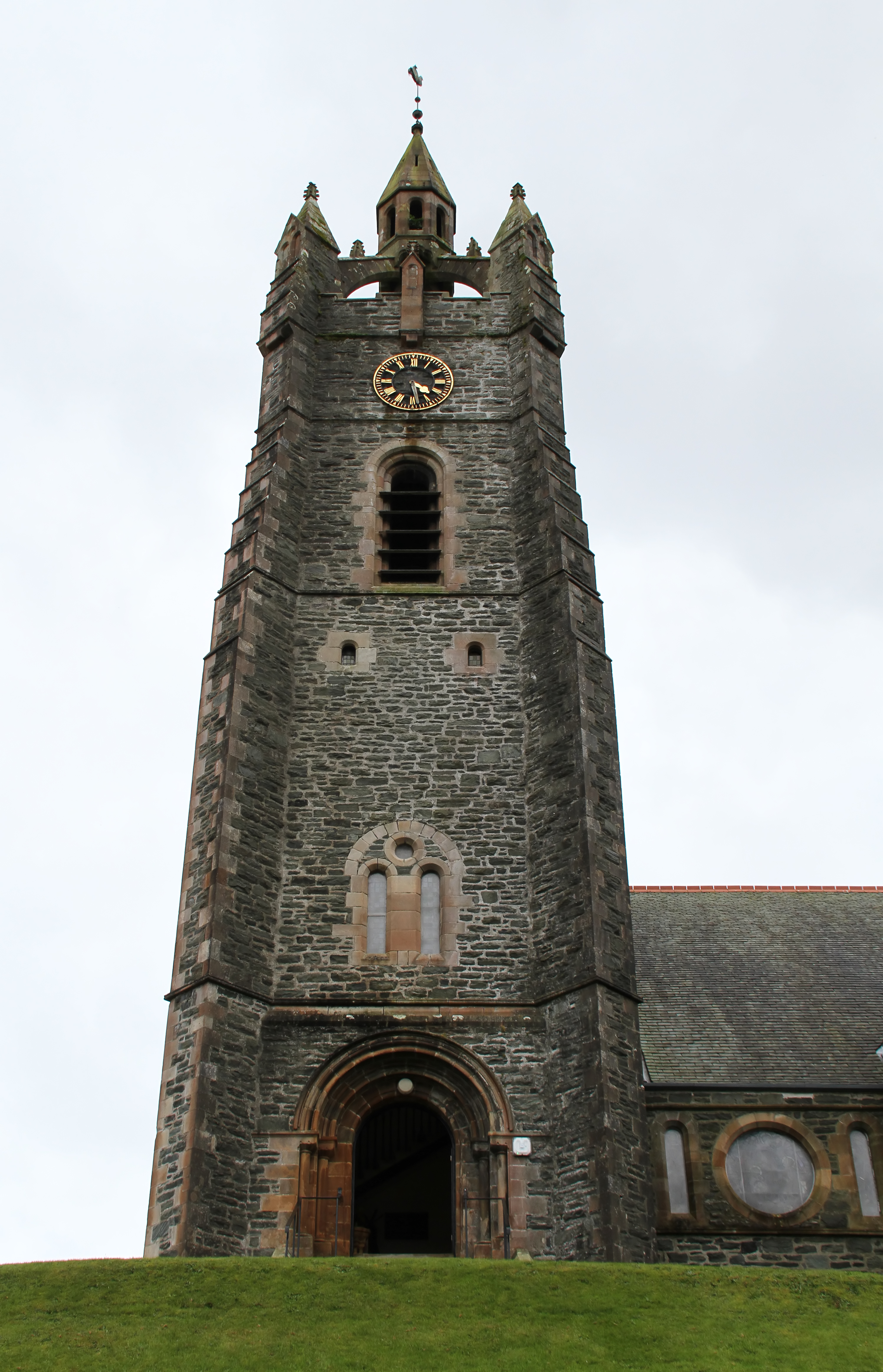
Tower of Tarbert parish church

== Demography ==
According to the United Kingdom Census 2001, the census locality (village and sub-area) of Tarbert had a population of 1,338.

== Transport ==
The A83 road runs 37.8 miles (60.8 km) southwest from Tarbert to Campbeltown. The village is served by a Caledonian MacBrayne ferry service, which connects Tarbert with Portavadie in the Cowal peninsula during the summer, and Lochranza on Arran in winter.

Preceding station	Ferry	Following station
Terminus	Caledonian MacBrayne; Ferry	Portavadie
Terminus	Caledonian MacBrayne; Ferry (Winter only)	Lochranza

== Notable people ==
People from Tarbert are known locally as "jakes".

- Sir Donald MacAlister, 1st Baronet of Tarbert KCB (17 May 1854–15 January 1934) was a physician, and principal and vice-chancellor and, later, chancellor of the University of Glasgow.
- George Campbell Hay (1915–1984) was a poet and translator, who wrote in Scottish Gaelic, Lowland Scots and English. He was born in Elderslie, Renfrewshire but raised in Tarbert.
- W. Murdoch Duncan (1909–1976) was a prolific British author; born in Glasgow, he lived in Tarbert.
