= George Heriot's School =

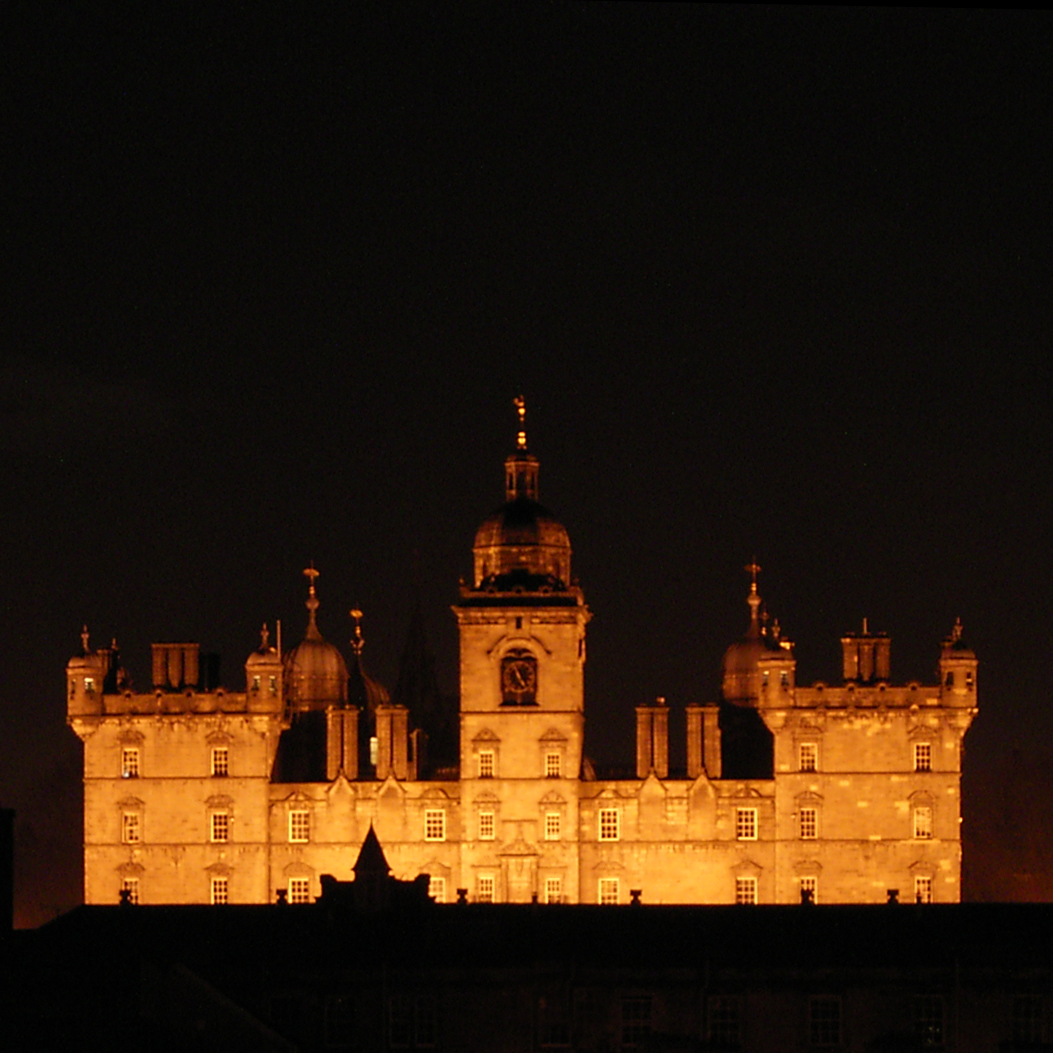

Location
- Lauriston Place; Edinburgh, EH3 9EQ; Scotland; 55°56′45″N 3°11′40″W

Information
- Former name: George Heriot's Hospital
- Type: Private day school
- Motto: Impendo (I Distribute Chearfullie)
- Established: 1628; 398 years ago
- Founder: George Heriot
- Oversight: George Heriot's Trust
- Chairman of Governors: Joyce Cullen
- Principal: Gareth Warren
- Staff: approx. 80
- Teaching staff: 155
- Gender: Co-educational
- Age: 3 to 18
- Enrolment: approx. 1600
- Houses: Castle Greyfriars Lauriston Raeburn
- Colours: Navy Blue, White
- Song: The Merry Month of June
- Publication: The Herioter
- Alumni: Herioters
- Website: www.george-heriots.com

George Heriot's School is a private day school on Lauriston Place in the Lauriston area of Edinburgh, Scotland. In the early 21st century, it has more than 1600 primary and secondary pupils, 155 teaching staff, and 80 non-teaching staff. It was established in 1628 as George Heriot's Hospital, by bequest of the royal goldsmith George Heriot, and opened in 1659. It is governed by George Heriot's Trust, a Scottish charity.

== Architecture ==
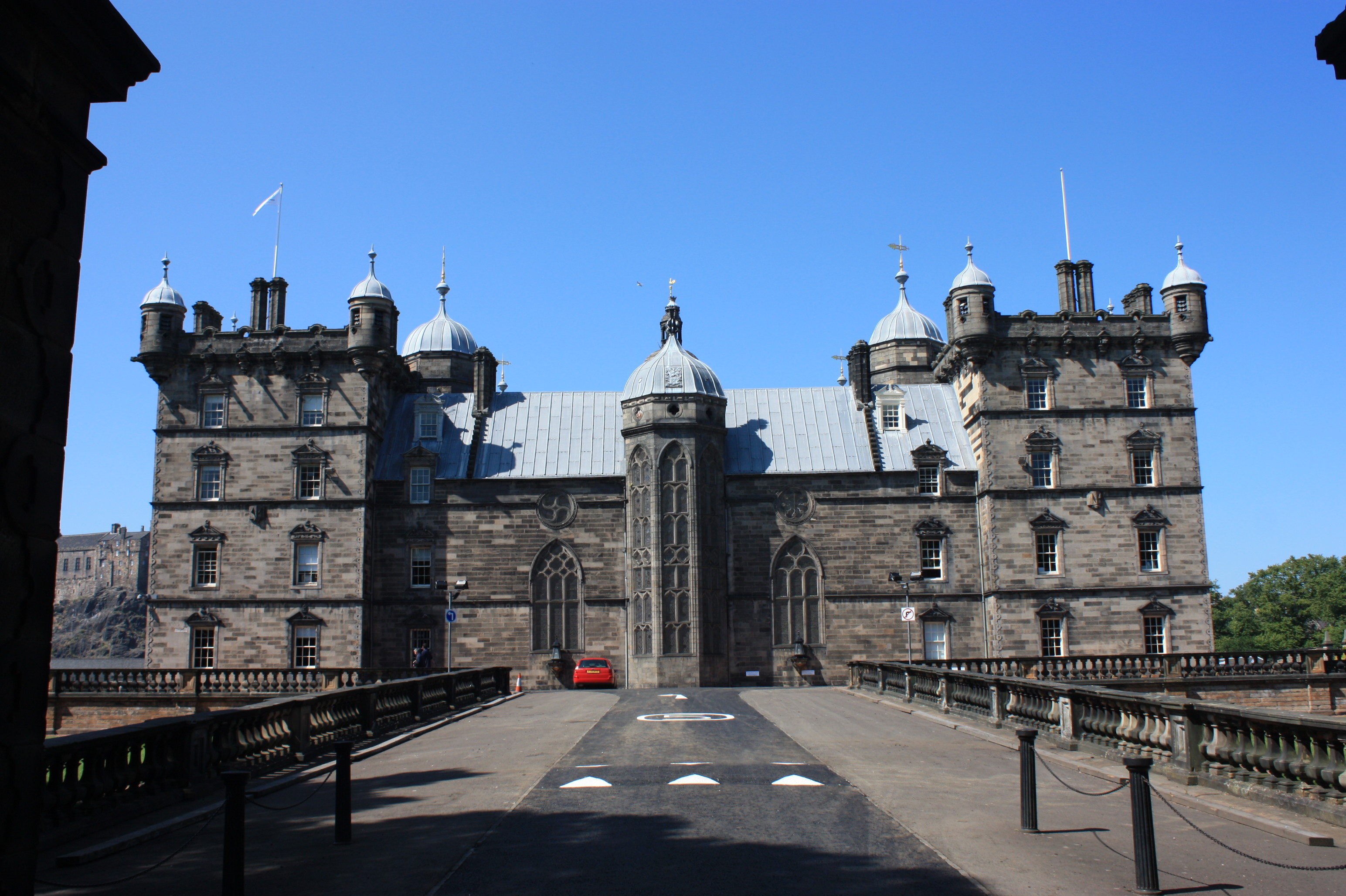
George Heriot's School, south side facing Lauriston Place (rear)

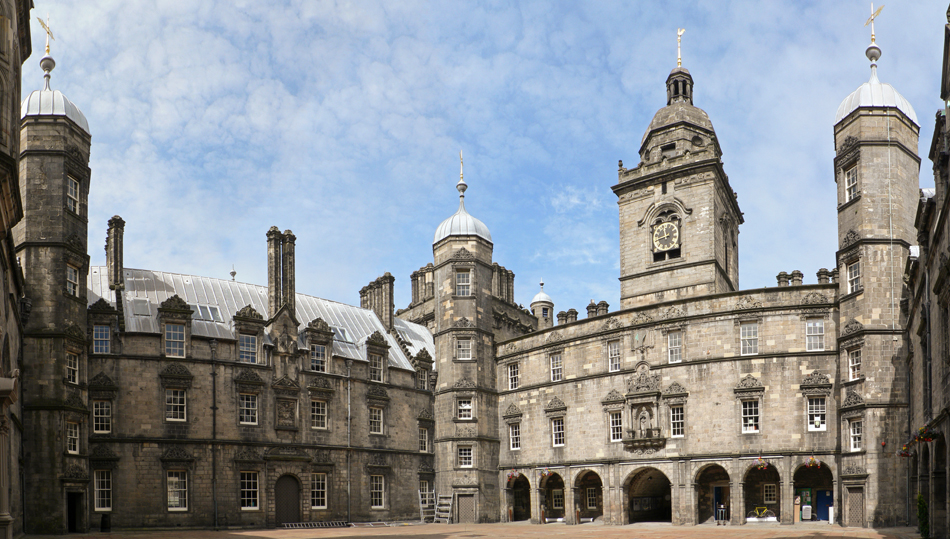
The Quadrangle, the north-west turret in the centre.

The main building of the school is notable for its renaissance architecture, the work of William Wallace, until his death in 1631. He was succeeded as master mason by William Aytoun, who was succeeded in turn by John Mylne. In 1676, Sir William Bruce drew up plans for the completion of Heriot's Hospital. His design, for the central tower of the north façade, was eventually executed in 1693.

The school is a turreted building surrounding a large quadrangle, and built out of sandstone. The foundation stone is inscribed with the date 1628. The intricate decoration above each window is unique (with one paired exception - those on the ground floor either side of the now redundant central turret on the west side of the building). A statue of the founder can be found in a niche on the north side of the quadrangle.

The main building was the first large building to be constructed outside the Edinburgh city walls. It is located next to Greyfriars Kirk, built in 1620, in open grounds overlooked by Edinburgh Castle directly to the north. Parts of the seventeenth-century city wall (the Telfer Wall) serve as the walls of the school grounds. When built, the building's front facade faced north with access from the Grassmarket by way of Heriot Bridge. It was originally the only facade fronted in fine ashlar stone, the others being harled rubble. "George Heriot's magnificent pile" became known locally, and by the boys who attended it, as the "Wark".

In 1833 the three rubble facades were refaced in Craigleith ashlar stone having become more visible when a new entrance was installed on Lauriston Place. The refacing work was handled by Alexander Black, then Superintendent of Works for the school. He later designed the first Heriot's free schools around the city.

The south gatehouse onto Lauriston Place is by William Henry Playfair and dates from 1829. The chapel interior (1837) is by James Gillespie Graham, who is likely to have been assisted by Augustus Pugin. The school hall was designed by Donald Gow in 1893 and boasts a hammerbeam roof. A mezzanine floor was added later. The science block is by John Chesser (architect) and dates from 1887, incorporating part of the former primary school of 1838 by Alexander Black (architect). The chemistry block to the west of the site was designed by John Anderson in 1911.

The grounds contain a selection of other buildings of varying age; these include a wing by inter-war school specialists Reid & Forbes, and a swimming pool, now unused due to a partially collapsed roof. A 1922 granite war memorial, by James Dunn, is dedicated to the school's former pupils and teachers who died in World War I. Alumni and teachers who died in World War II were also added to the memorial.

== History ==
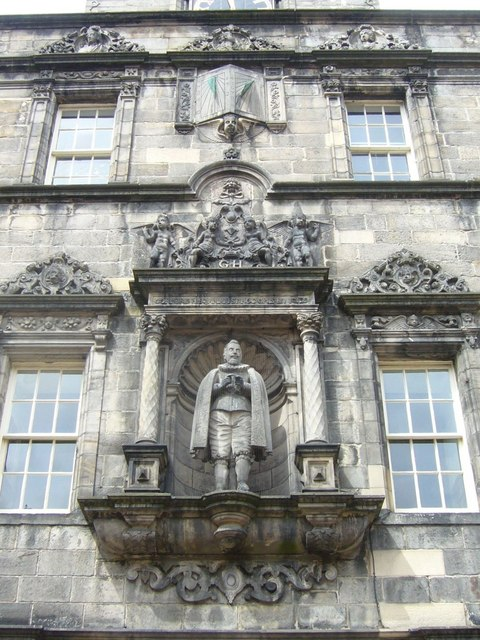
Statue of George Heriot in the quadrangle

=== 17th and 18th centuries ===
On his death in 1624, George Heriot left just over 23,625 pounds sterling – equivalent to £5,198,472 in 2025 – to found a "hospital" (a charitable school and almshouse) on the model of Christ's Hospital in London, to care for the "puir, faitherless bairns" (Scots: poor, fatherless children) and children of "decayit" (fallen on hard times) burgesses and freemen of Edinburgh.

The construction of Heriot's Hospital (as it was first called) was begun in 1628, just outside the city walls of Edinburgh. It was completed in time to be occupied by Oliver Cromwell's English forces during the invasion of Scotland during the Third English Civil War. When the building was used as a barracks, Cromwell's forces stabled their horses in the chapel. The hospital opened in 1659, with thirty sickly children in residence. As its finances grew, it took in other pupils in addition to the orphans for whom it was intended.

By the end of the 18th century, the Governors of the George Heriot's Trust had purchased the Barony of Broughton, thus acquiring extensive land for feuing (a form of leasehold) on the northern slope below James Craig's Georgian New Town. This and other land purchases beyond the original city boundary generated considerable revenue through leases for the Trust long after Heriot's death.

=== 19th and 20th centuries ===
In 1846 there was an insurrection in the Hospital and fifty-two boys were dismissed. This was the worst of several disturbances in the 1840s. Critics of hospital education blamed what they described as the monastic separation of the boys from home life. Only a minority (52 out of 180 in 1844) were fatherless, which meant, these critics argued, that poorer families were leaving their children to Hospital care, even through holiday periods, and the influence of disaffected older boys. 'Auld Callants' (former pupils) were prepared to defend the Hospital as a source of hope and discipline to families in difficulties. This argument about the value of hospitals, which reached the pages of The Times in late 1846, was taken up by Duncan McLaren when he became Lord Provost of Edinburgh, and therefore Chairman of the Hospital Governors, in 1851. McLaren pushed for the number of boys in the Hospital to be reduced and for the Heriot outdoor schools to be expanded with the resources thus saved.

Duncan McLaren was the primary initiator of the 1836 Act that gave the Heriot Governors the power to use the Heriot Trust's surplus to set up "outdoor" (i.e. outside the Hospital) schools. Between 1838 and 1885 the Trust set up and ran 13 juvenile and 8 infant outdoor schools across Edinburgh. At its height in the early 1880s this network of Heriot schools, which did not charge any fees, had a total roll of almost 5,000 pupils. The outdoor Heriot school buildings were sold off or rented out (some to the Edinburgh School Board) when the network was wound up after 1885 as part of reforms to the Trust and the absorption of its outdoor activities by the public school system. Several of these buildings, including the Cowgate, Davie Street, Holyrood and Stockbridge Schools, were designed with architectural features copied from the Lauriston Place Hospital building or stonework elements referring to George Heriot.

George Heriot's Hospital was at the centre of the controversies surrounding Scottish educational endowments between the late 1860s and the mid 1880s. At a time when general funding for secondary education was not politically possible, reform of these endowments was seen as a way to facilitate access beyond elementary education. The question was, for whom; those who could afford to pay fees or those who could not? The Heriot's controversy was therefore a central issue in Edinburgh municipal politics at this time. In 1875 a Heriot Trust Defence Committee (HTDC) was formed in opposition to the recommendations of the (Colebrooke) Commission on Endowed Schools and Hospitals, set up in 1872. These included making the Hospital a secondary technical day school, using Heriot money to fund university scholarships, introducing fees for the outdoor schools and accepting foundationers from outside Edinburgh. The HTDC saw this as a spoliation of Edinburgh's poor to the benefit of the middle classes. Already in 1870, under the permissive Endowed Institutions (Scotland) Act of the previous year, and again in 1879 to the (Moncreiff) Commission on Endowed Institutions in Scotland, and finally in 1883 to the (Balfour) Commission on Educational Endowments, Heriot's submitted schemes of reform. All were turned down. The reasons included Heriot's continuing commitment to free and hospital education, and its maintenance of the Heriot outdoor schools after the passage of the Education (Scotland) Act in 1872 brought in publicly supported, compulsory elementary education. The Balfour Commission had executive powers and used these in 1885 to impose reform on Heriot's. The Hospital became a day school, charging a modest fee, for boys of 10 and above. Up to 120 foundationers, no younger than 7 years of age, enjoyed preferential admission. Greek was not to be taught. The new George Heriot's Hospital School was, in other words, to be a modern, technically oriented institution. The outdoor school network was to be wound up and the resources used for a variety of scholarships and bursaries, including a number to be used for attendance at the High School and University of Edinburgh. These, rather than the new Heriot's day school, were to provide a path to university education for those able and interested. There were elements in this scheme of a response to contemporary European educational reforms, such as that exemplified by the German Realschulen.

The most uncontroversial aspect of the Balfour Commission's scheme of 1885 for the reform of the Heriot's Hospital and Trust was the takeover of the "Watt Institution and School of Arts" by the Trust. This was to be renamed the Heriot-Watt College. This was not just a matter of the Trust providing financial support, but was part of a policy of encouraging technical education in Edinburgh. Provision was especially to be made for pupils to continue their studies after completing the higher classes of the new Heriot's day school. The School and the College were both run under the Heriot board of governors until the development and financial needs of the College required a separation in 1927. The Trust continued to make a contribution to the College of £8,000 p.a. thereafter. In 1966 the College was granted university status as Heriot-Watt University.

In 1979 Heriot's became co-educational after admitting girls. In the same year Lothian Regional Council attempted to bring the school in to the local authority system, but the Secretary of State for Scotland intervened.

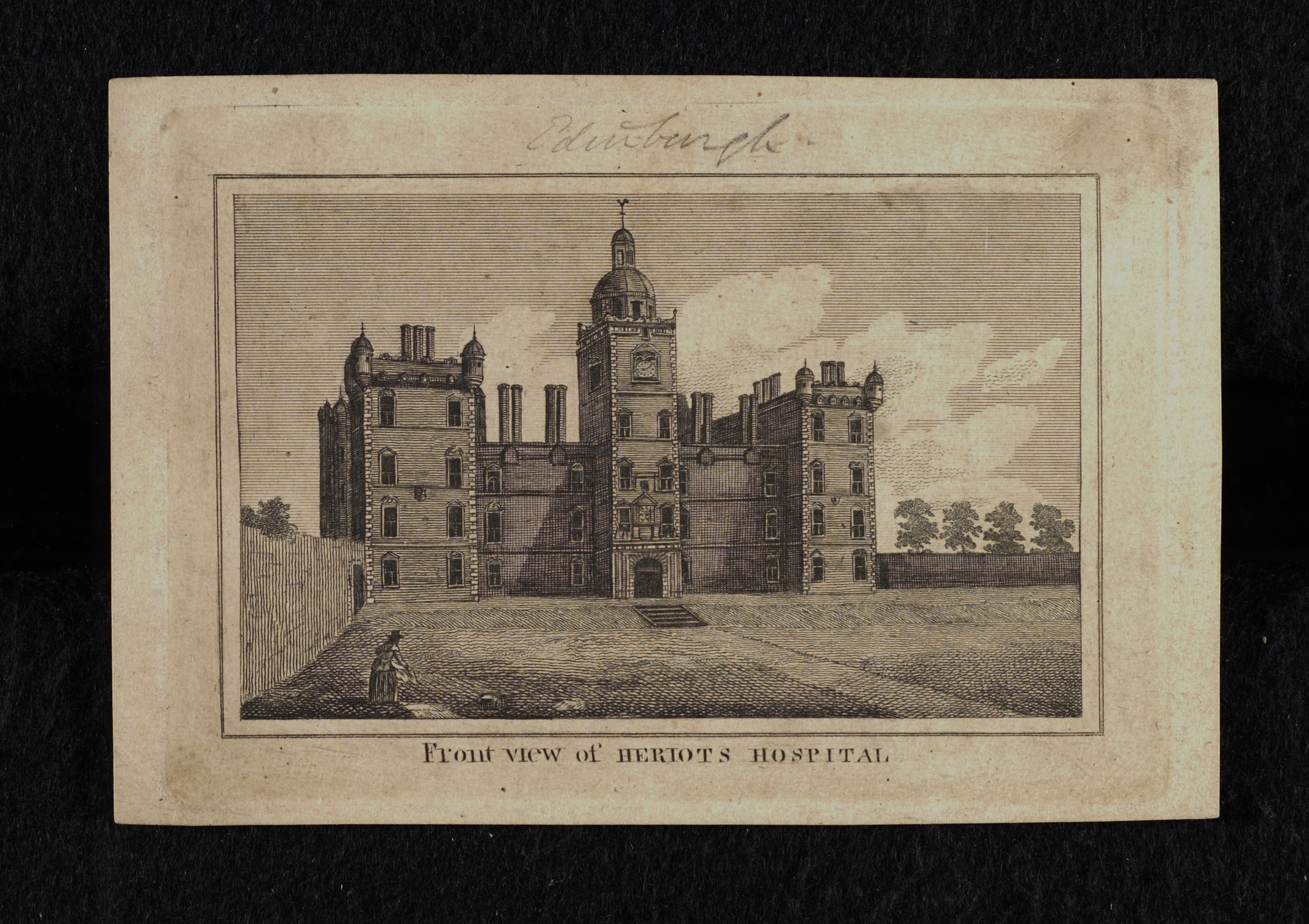
Front view of Heriot's Hospital

=== Modern era ===
In the early 21st century, George Heriot's has approximately 1600 pupils. It continues to serve its charitable goal by providing free education to children who are bereaved of a parent, such children being referred to as "foundationers". In 2012, the school was ranked as Edinburgh's best performing school by Higher exam results.

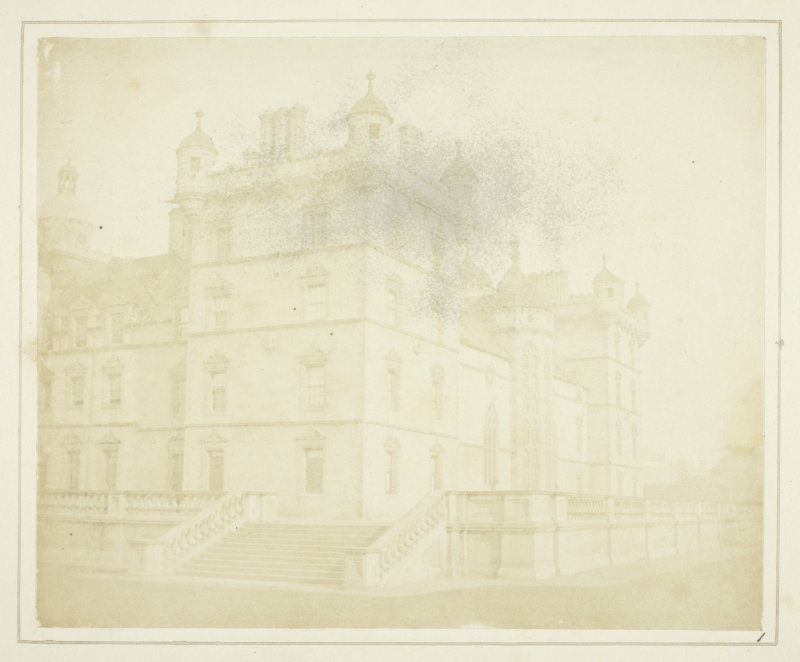
Heriot's Hospital, Edinburgh by Henry Fox Talbot, 1844

== Headmasters and principals ==
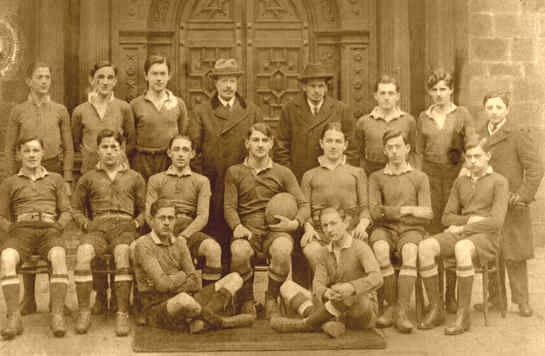
Rugby team of Serbian students at George Heriot's school in 1918

Chronological list of the headmasters of the school, the year given being the one in which they took office.

- 1659 James Lawson
- 1664 David Davidsone
- 1669 David Browne
- 1670 William Smeaton
- 1673 Harry Moresone
- 1699 James Buchan
- 1702 John Watson
- 1720 David Chrystie
- 1734 William Matheson
- 1735 John Hunter
- 1741 William Halieburton
- 1741 John Henderson
- 1757 James Colvill
- 1769 George Watson
- 1773 William Hay
- 1782 Thomas Thomson
- 1792 David Cruikshank
- 1794 James Maxwell Cockburn
- 1795 George Irvine
- 1805 John Somerville
- 1816 John Christison
- 1825 James Boyd
- 1829 Hector Holme
- 1839 William Steven
- 1844 James Fairburn
- 1854 Frederick W. Bedford
- 1880 David Fowler Lowe
- 1908 John Brown Clark
- 1926 William Gentle
- 1942 William Carnon
- 1947 William Dewar
- 1970 Allan McDonald
- 1983 Keith Pearson
- 1997 Alistair Hector

Thereafter, the title of Headmaster was changed to that of Principal.

- 2014 (January) Gareth Doodes
- 2014 (September) Cameron Wyllie (Acting)
- 2014 (December) Cameron Wyllie
- 2018 (January) Mrs Lesley Franklin
- 2021 (August) Gareth Warren

== Other notable staff ==
- James Craik, Classics, c.1822 to c.1832
- John Watt Butters, Maths, 1888 to 1899
- James Stagg, Science, 1921 to 1923
- Donald Hastie, Games, 1949 to 1979 Hastie was reportedly the first full-time games master in Scotland.
- Ray Milne, French and German, 1974 to 1978
- Sam Mort, English and Drama (1997 to 2001), in 2021 Unicef chief of Communication, Advocacy and Civic Engagement in Afghanistan

== Sports and extra-curricular activities ==
Former pupils' clubs, the Heriot's Rugby Club and Heriot's Cricket Club, carry the School's name and use the School's Goldenacre grounds. George Heriot's School Rowing Club competes at a national level and is affiliated to Scottish Rowing. There is a pipe band, and around 120 pupils take tuition of some kind.

== Notable alumni ==
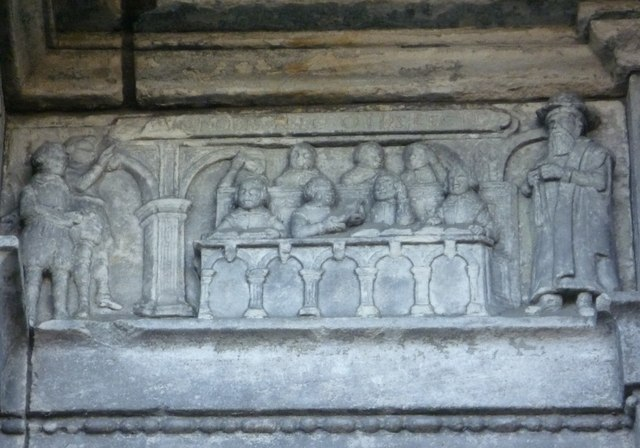
Carving of a 17th-century classroom with a dominie and his ten scholars. Positioned at the school's main entrance, the motto reads, DEVS NOBIS HAEC OTIA FECIT - "God hath given us this leisure"..

Academia and Science

- George Alexander Carse (1880 – 1950) - physicist (dux in 1898)
- J. W. S. Cassels, FRS (1922 – 2015) - mathematician
- Henry Daniels, FRS (1912 – 2000) - statistician
- Robin Ferrier (1932 – 2013) - organic chemist
- Sir George Taylor (1904 - 1993)
- Sir Thomas Dalling (1892 - 1982) - Professor of Animal Pathology at Cambridge and Chief Veterinary Officer to the United Kingdom
- John Borthwick Gilchrist (1759 – 1841) - Indologist
- Professor Sir Abraham Goldberg (1923 – 2007), KB MD DSc FRCP FRSE - Emeritus Regius Professor of Medicine, University of Glasgow
- Professor Vernon Heywood (1927 - 2022) plant taxonomist and conservationist
- Professor Hyman Levy (1889 – 1975), FRSE - Scottish philosopher, mathematician, political activist
- Sir Harry (Work) Melville (1908 – 2000), FRSE - polymer chemist and administrator
- Professor Hamish Scott FBA FRSE (b. 1946) - historian
- Professor Gordon Turnbull (b. ) - psychiatrist
- Professor Douglas C. Heggie (b. 1947), FRSE - Personal Chair of Mathematical Astronomy, School of Mathematics, University of Edinburgh
- Alexander Burns Wallace (1906–1974) - plastic surgeon

Media and Arts

- Nick Abbot (b. 1960) - radio broadcaster
- Ian Bairnson (b. 1953) - musician, member of Pilot and The Alan Parsons Project
- Emun Elliott (b. 1983) - actor
- Gavin Esler (b. 1953) - television journalist and presenter of Newsnight
- Mark Goodier (b. 1961) - Radio One disc jockey
- Mike Heron (b. 1942) - musician, formerly of the Incredible String Band
- Roy Kinnear (1934 – 1988) - actor
- Duncan Hendry (1951 - 2003) - Chief Executive of Aberdeen Performing Arts and of Edinburgh's Capital Theatres
- Iain Macwhirter (b. 1953) - journalist and Rector of the University of Edinburgh (2009 – 2012)
- Charles Nowosielski (1953 - 2020), theatre director
- Henry Raeburn (1756 – 1823) - painter
- Ian Richardson (1934 – 2007) - actor
- Mike Scott (musician) (b. 1958) - musician and composer, founder of The Waterboys
- Alastair Sim (1900 – 1976) - actor
- Ken Stott (b. 1955) - actor
- Bryan Swanson (b. 1980) - Sky Sports chief reporter
- Nigel Tranter (1909 – 2000) - historical novelist
- Robert Urquhart (1921 – 1995) - actor
- Charlotte Wells - film director
- Paul Young (actor) (b. 1944) - actor

Law and Politics

- Tasmina Ahmed-Sheikh (b. 1970) - SNP politician
- Euan Duthie, Lord Duthie (b.1975) – Scottish judge
- James Mackay, Baron Mackay of Clashfern (b. 1927) - Advocate and former Lord Chancellor
- David McLetchie (1952 – 2013) - former leader of the Scottish Conservatives
- Doug Naysmith (b. 1941) - Labour politician and former MP for Bristol North West
- Keith Stewart, Baron Stewart of Dirleton - HM Advocate General for Scotland
- Gordon Prentice (b. 1951) - Labour politician and former MP for Pendle
- Stephen Woolman, Lord Woolman (b. 1953) - Senator of the College of Justice
- Kenneth Borthwick CBE DL JP (1915 – 2017) - Lord Provost of Edinburgh (1977 to 1980), Chairman of the 1986 Commonwealth Games
- Sir Adam Wilson (1814 – 1891) - 15th mayor of Toronto, member of the Legislative Assembly of the Province of Canada

Sports

- Bruce Douglas (b. 1980) - Rugby Union player
- Charles Groves (1896–1969) - cricketer
- Andy Irvine (b. 1951) - Rugby Union internationalist
- Iain Milne (b. 1956) - Rugby Union player
- Kenny Milne (b. 1961) - Rugby Union player
- Robert More (b. 1980) - cricketer
- John Mushet (1875–1965) - cricketer
- Gordon Ross (b. 1978) - Rugby Union player
- Ken Scotland (b. 1936) - Rugby Union internationalist
- Polly Swann (b. 1988) - Member of the GB Rowing Team, and Rowing World Champion
- Douglas Walker (b. 1973) - sprinter

Military

- Colonel Clive Fairweather (1944 – 2012) - 2nd in command of the SAS during the Iranian Embassy siege.
- David Stuart McGregor (1895 – 1918) - Scottish recipient of the Victoria Cross

Religion

- Graham Forbes, CBE (b. 1951) - Provost of St Mary's Cathedral, Edinburgh
- Hector Bransby Gooderham (1901 – 1977) - priest of the Scottish Episcopal Church
- Gordon Keddie (1944 - 2023) - Reformed Presbyterian minister and theologian
- James Pitt-Watson (1893–1962) - theologian and Moderator of the General Assembly of the Church of Scotland
- Brian Smith (bishop) (b. 1943) - Bishop of Edinburgh (Scottish Episcopal Church) 2001–2011

Other

- James Aitken, aka "John the Painter" (1752 – 1777) - mercenary
- Hippolyte Blanc (1844 – 1917) - architect
- Archie Forbes (1913 – 1999), CBE - Colonial administrator
- Norman Irons (1941 - 2023) - former Lord Provost of Edinburgh
- Sir Andrew Hunter Arbuthnot Murray (1903 – 1977) - former Lord Provost of Edinburgh
- Stuart Harris (1920 – 1997), architect and local historian
- Fiona Ritchie British High Comminssioner to Malawi from 2022.
