= W. Murdoch Duncan =

Scottish crime novelist (1909–1976)

William Murdoch Duncan (born 18 November 1909 in Glasgow – died 19 April 1976, also in Glasgow, from cancer) was a prolific Scottish thriller writer, who wrote some 220 crime novels, 53 under his own name and the rest under various pseudonyms - including John Cassells, Neill Graham, Peter Malloch and Lovat Marshall. Among these works, he had the following series characters: "The Dreamer" (Superintendent D. Reamer), Superintendent Gaylord, Mr Gilly, Greensleeves, Laurie Hume, Superintendent Leslie, Superintendent Macneill, Inspector (later Superintendent) Flagg, "The Picaroon" (Ludovic Saxon), James "Solo" Malcolm, and Sugar Cane.

He was educated at the University of Glasgow (where he obtained a Master's degree in history) and served in the British Army during World War II. Willie and Marion (née Hughes) Duncan lived at Loup Cottage, near Tarbert, Argyll, Scotland. He sent his manuscripts to a lady in Wales for typewriting; then looked the result over and once or twice a year (reluctantly) went to London with half a dozen or so novels.

== Bibliography ==
=== As W. Murdoch Duncan ===
(All until 1952 inclusive were published by Melrose; the next four were published by Rich and Cowan; from 1957 onwards all were published by John Long)

- The Doctor Deals with Murder (1944)
- Death Wears a Silk Stocking (1945)
- Mystery on the Clyde (1945)
- Murder at Caris Marks (1945)
- Death Beckons Quietly (1946)
- Keep Killer (1946)
- Straight Ahead for Danger (1946)
- The Tiled House Mystery (1947)
- The Blackbird Sings of Murder (1948)
- The Puppets of Father Bouvard (1948)
- The Cult of the Queer People (1949)
- The Brothers of Judgement (1950)
- The Black Mitre (1951)
- The Company of Sinners (1951)
- The Blood Red Leaf (1952)
- Death Comes to Lady's Steps (1952)
- The Deathmaster (1953)
- Death Stands Round the Corner (1955)
- A Knife in the Night (1955)
- Pennies for His Eyes (1956)
- Murder Calls the Tune (1957)
- The Joker Deals with Death (1958)
- The Murder Man (1959)
- The Whispering Man (1959)
- The Hooded Man (1960)
- The House in Spite Street (1961)
- The Nighthawk (1962)
- Redfingers (1962)
- The Crime Master (1963)
- Meet the Dreamer (1963)
- The Green Knight (1963)
- The Hour of the Bishop (1964)
- The House of Wailing Winds (1965)
- Again the Dreamer (1965)
- Presenting the Dreamer (1966)
- Case for the Dreamer (1966)
- The Council of Comforters (1967)
- Problem for the Dreamer (1967)
- Salute the Dreamer (1968)
- The Dreamer Intervenes (1968)
- Cord for a Killer (1969)
- Challenge for the Dreamer (1969)
- The Green Triangle (1969)
- The Dreamer Deals with Murder (1970)
- The Whisperer (1970)
- Detail for the Dreamer (1971)
- The Breath of Murder (1972)
- The Dreamer at Large (1972)
- The Big Timer (1973)
- Prey for the Dreamer (1974)
- Death and Mr Gilly (1974)
- Laurels for the Dreamer (1975)
- Murder of a Cop (1976)

=== As John Cassells ===
(All until 1952 inclusive were published by Melrose; the next nine (from 1953 to 1957) were published by Muller; from 1958 onwards all were published by John Long)

- The Sons of Morning (1946)
- The Bastion of the Damned (1946)
- Murder Comes to Rothesay (1946)
- The Mark of the Leech (1947)
- Master of the Dark (1948)
- The League of Nameless Men (1948)
- The Castle of Sin (1949)
- The Clue of the Purple Asters (1949)
- The Waters of Sadness (1950)
- The Circle of Dust (1950)
- The Grey Ghost (1951)
- Exit Mr Shane (1951)
- The Second Mrs Locke (1952)
- The Rattler (1952)
- Salute Inspector Flagg (1953)
- Case for Inspector Flagg (1954)
- Enter the Picaroon (1954)
- Inspector Flagg and the Scarlet Skeleton (1955)
- The Avenging Picaroon (1956)
- Again Inspector Flagg (1956)
- Beware! The Picaroon (1956)
- Meet the Picaroon (1957)
- Presenting Inspector Flagg (1957)
- Case 29 (1958)
- The Engaging Picaroon (1958)
- Enter Superintendent Flagg (1959)
- The Enterprising Picaroon (1959)
- Score for Superintendent Flagg (1960)
- Salute the Picaroon (1960)
- Problem for Superintendent Flagg (1961)
- The Brothers of Benevolence (1962)
- The Picaroon Goes West (1962)
- Prey for the Picaroon (1963)
- The Council of the Rat (1963)
- Blue Mask (1964)
- Challenge for the Picaroon (1964)
- Grey Face (1965)
- The Benevolent Picaroon (1965)
- Plunder for the Picaroon (1966)
- Blackfingers (1966)
- The Audacious Picaroon (1967)
- The Room in Quiver Court (1967)
- The Elusive Picaroon (1968)
- Call for Superintendent Flagg (1968)
- Night of the Picaroon (1969)
- The Double-Crosser (1969)
- Quest for the Picaroon (1970)
- The Grafter (1970)
- The Picaroon Collects (1970)
- The Hatchet Man (1971)
- Profit for the Picaroon (1972)
- The Enforcer (1973)
- The Picaroon Laughs Last (1973)
- Killer's Rope (1974)
- Action for the Picaroon (1975)
- Quest for Superintendent Flagg (1975)
- The Picaroon Gets the Run-Around (1976)

=== As Neill Graham ===
(the first four below were published by Melrose; the next eleven (to 1959) were published by Jarrolds; from 1960 onwards all were published by John Long)

- The Symbol of the Cat (1948)
- Passport to Murder (1949)
- The Temple of Slumber (1950)
- Murder Walks on Tiptoe (1951)
- The Quest of Mr. Sandyman (1951)
- The Amazing Mr. Sandyman (1952)
- Again Mr. Sandyman (1952)
- Salute Mr. Sandyman (1953)
- Murder Makes a Date (1955)
- Play It Solo (1955)
- Say It with Murder (1956)
- You Can't Call It Murder (1957)
- Hit Me Hard (1958)
- Salute to Murder (1958)
- Murder Rings the Bell (1959)
- Killers Are on Velvet (1960)
- Murder Is My Weakness (1961)
- Murder on the "Duchess" (1961)
- Make Mine Murder (1962)
- Graft Town (1963)
- Label It Murder (1963)
- Murder Makes It Certain (1963)
- Murder of a Black Cat (1964)
- Murder Made Easy (1965)
- Murder on My Hands (1965)
- Murder's Always Final (1965)
- Money for Murder (1966)
- Murder on Demand (1966)
- Murder Has Been Done (1967)
- Murder Makes the News (1967)
- Candidate for a Coffin (1968)
- Pay Off (1968)
- Death of a Canary (1969)
- Murder Lies in Waiting (1969)
- Blood on the Pavement (1970)
- One for the Book (1970)
- A Matter of Murder (1971)
- Murder, Double Murder (1971)
- Frame-Up (1972)
- Cop in a Tight Frame (1973)
- Murder in a Dark Room (1973)
- Assignment, Murder (1974)
- Murder on the List (1975)
- Search for a Missing Lady (1976)
- Motive for Murder (1977)

=== As Peter Malloch ===
(the first three novels below were published by Rich and Cowan; all the rest were published by John Long)

- 11:20 Glasgow Central (1955)
- Sweet Lady Death (1956)
- Tread Softly, Death (1957)
- Walk In, Death (1957)
- Fly Away, Death (1958)
- My Shadow, Death (1959)
- Hardiman's Landing (1960)
- Anchor Island (1962)
- Blood Money (1962)
- Break-Through (1963)
- Fugitive's Road (1963)
- Cop-Lover (1964)
- The Nicholas Snatch (1964)
- The Sniper (1965)
- Lady of No Compassion (1966)
- The Big Steal (1966)
- Murder of the Man Next Door (1966)
- Die, My Beloved (1967)
- Johnny Blood (1967)
- Murder of a Student (1968)
- Death Whispers Softly (1968)
- Backwash (1969)
- Blood on Pale Fingers (1969)
- The Adjuster (1970)
- The Grab (1970)
- The Slugger (1971)
- Two with a Gun (1971)
- Write-Off (1972)
- Kickback (1973)
- The Delinquents (1974)
- The Big Killing (1974)
- Killer's Blade (1975)
- The Big Deal (1977)

=== As Lovat Marshall ===
(the first two below were published by Hurst and Blackett, the next two were published by John Long; all from 1960 onwards were published by Robert Hale)

- Sugar for the Lady (1955)
- Sugar on the Carpet (1956)
- Sugar Cuts the Corners (1957)
- Sugar on the Target (1958)
- Sugar on the Cuff (1960)
- Sugar on the Kill (1961)
- Sugar on the Loose (1962)
- Sugar on the Prowl (1962)
- Murder in Triplicate (1963)
- Murder Is the Reason (1964)
- Ladies Can Be Dangerous (1964)
- Death Strikes in Darkness (1965)
- The Dead Are Silent (1966)
- The Dead Are Dangerous (1966)
- Murder of a Lady (1967)
- Blood on the Blotter (1968)
- Money Means Murder (1968)
- Death Is for Ever (1969)
- Murder's Out of Season (1970)
- Murder's Just for Cops (1971)
- Death Casts a Shadow (1972)
- Moment for Murder (1972)
- Loose Lady Death (1973)
- Date with Murder (1973)
- Murder Town (1974)
- The Strangler (1974)
- Key to Murder (1975)
- Murder Mission (1975)
- Murder to Order (1975)

=== As Martin Locke ===
- The Vengeance of Mortimer Daly (1961) - published by Ward Lock

=== As John Dallas ===
- The Night of the Storm (1961) - published by Jenkins
- Red Ice (1973) - published by Robert Hale

== Sources ==
- http://www.classiccrimefiction.com
