= William Barr McKinnon Duncan =

Scottish businessman (1922–1984)

Sir William Barr McKinnon Duncan KB CBE FRSE (16 December 1922 – 5 November 1984) was a Scottish businessman who served as a director of ICI in both the UK and USA and as chairman and chief executive of the Rolls-Royce Corporation.

== Life ==
He was born on 16 December 1922 and attended Ardrossan Academy. He then studied Mechanical Engineering at Glasgow University, graduating BSc. He was then apprenticed to the Nobel Division of ICI at Ardeer, North Ayrshire.

From 1966 to 1973 he was President of the ICI (America) and then in 1977 became Departmental Chairman of the entire ICI corporation. In 1983 he became Chief Executive of the Rolls-Royce Corporation.

He was created a Commander of the Order of the British Empire in the 1973 New Years Honours List. In 1975 he is listed as a Member of the National Enterprise Board. He was elected a Fellow of the Royal Society of Edinburgh in 1980. His proposers form one of the longest and most impressive lists within the Society: Lord Polwarth, Sir Samuel Curran, Sir Edward M Wright, Sir John Atwell, William Whigham Fletcher, William McPhee Hutchison, Alistair North, George Murray Burnett, Alick Buchanan-Smith, Baron Balerno and Robert Allan Smith. On 17 March 1983 he was knighted by Queen Elizabeth II at Buckingham Palace.

He died on 5 November 1984.

== Family ==
In 1951 he married Christina Boyd Worth.
