= John Brown Clark =

Scottish mathematician

John Brown Clark or Clarke CBE LLD FRSE (30 April 1861 – 19 July 1947) was a Scottish mathematician. He was headmaster of George Heriot's School from 1908 to 1926. He served as Vice President of the Royal Society of Edinburgh 1931–34.

== Life ==
He was born in West Linton on 30 April 1861 the son of George Clark from Newbigging, South Lanarkshire. He attended West Linton School and then from 1877 the Heriot School at Abbeyhill in Edinburgh. From 1881 he trained at the Established Church Training College in Edinburgh. From 1883 to 1885 he served as an assistant teacher at St Leonards school in Edinburgh, then studied for a degree at the University of Edinburgh, graduating with and MA in 1889. He then obtained a job teaching mathematics at George Heriot's School. In 1908 he succeeded David Fowler Lowe as headmaster and served in that role until 1926. He was succeeded in his role by William Gentle FRSE.

In 1891 he was elected a Fellow of the Royal Society of Edinburgh, his proposers including Sir John Murray, George Chrystal, Peter Guthrie Tait and David Fowler Lowe. He served as a Councillor from 1928 to 1931 and as its Vice-President from 1931 to 1934. He was awarded a Commander of the Order of the British Empire in 1935.

He died on 19 July 1947.

== Family ==
He married Mary Mackay in 1891.

== Other roles ==
He joined the Edinburgh Mathematical Society in December 1885. He served as its Secretary 1891–96, Vice-President 1896–97 and President 1897–98.
