= David Fowler Lowe =

David Fowler Lowe FRSE LLD (11 January 1843 – 17 January 1924) was headmaster of George Heriot's School from 1880 to 1908.

== Life ==
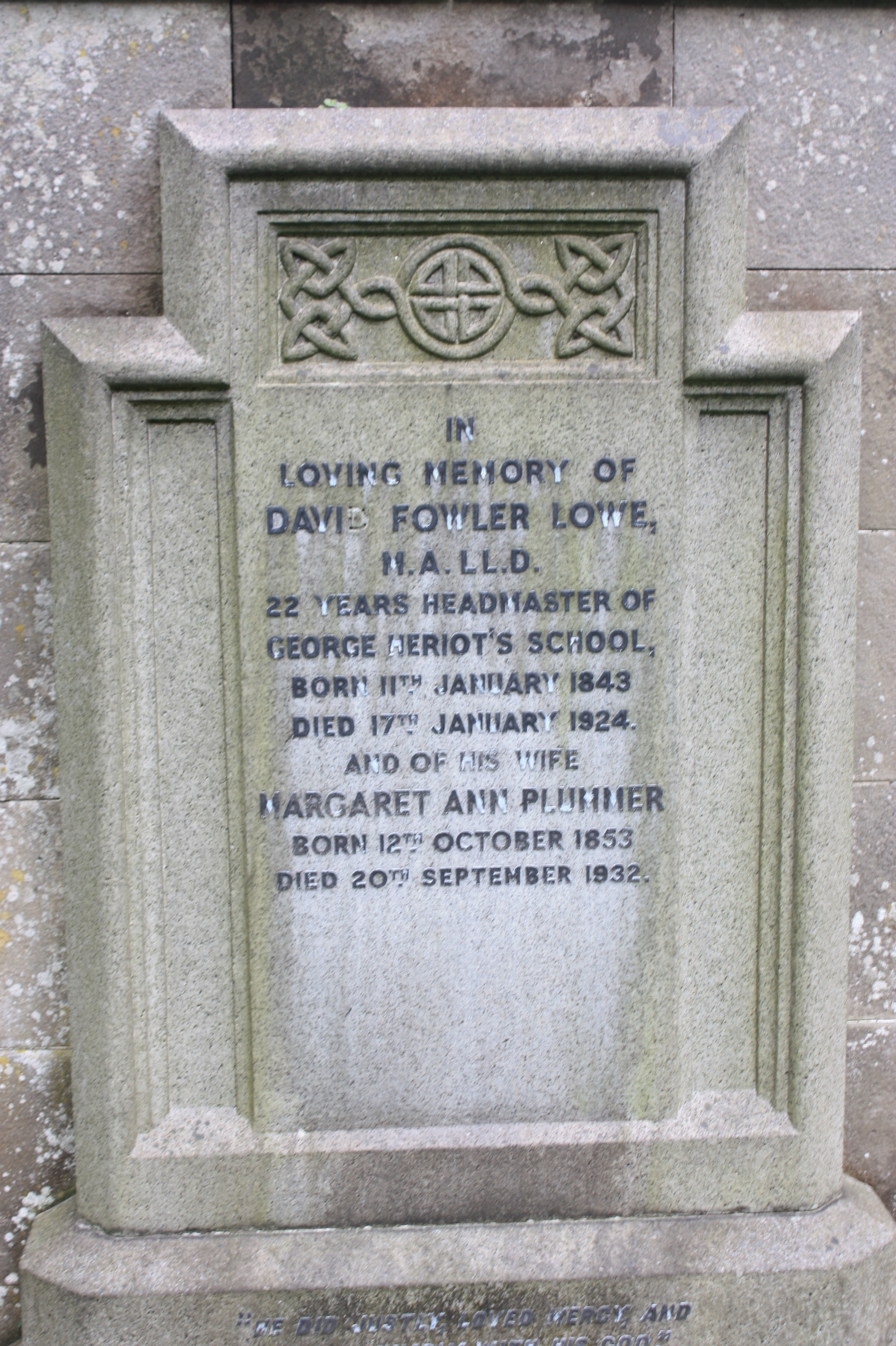
The grave of David Fowler Lowe, Grange Cemetery, Edinburgh

Lowe was born in Leslie, Fife on 11 January 1843. He was educated locally and then went to the University of Edinburgh where he graduated with an MA around 1864, having specialised in French and German. He began his career teaching English in George Heriot's School then moved to teach French. He left for five years to be Rector of Bathgate Academy, returning in 1880 to succeed Frederick W. Bedford as headmaster. In 1886, following some provisions of the Scottish Education Act, he oversaw the transition of the school from an Endowed School into a more standard Secondary School for Boys. Through this he managed to still maintain the school as a fee-paying school. In 1888 he was elected a Fellow of the Royal Society of Edinburgh. His proposers were George Chrystal, Sir John Murray, Alexander Buchan and John George Bartholomew. He was an active member of the Society and did much to promote membership. He was given an honorary doctorate (LLD) by the University of Edinburgh in 1899.

While headmaster he lived in rooms in the school. He retired as headmaster in 1908 and was succeeded by John Brown Clark. On retiral he moved to 19 George Square, not far from the school.

From 1903 to 1917 he served on the Court of the University.

He died on 17 January 1924 aged 81. He is buried in the Grange Cemetery in southern Edinburgh. The grave lies on the eastern wall near the south-east corner.

== Family ==
He was married to Margaret Ann Plummer (1853–1932).
