= Newbigging =

Newbigging is the name of several places in Scotland:

- Newbigging, Angus, Scotland
- Newbigging, Auchtertool, Fife, Scotland
- Newbigging, Burntisland, Fife, Scotland
- Newbigging, Carnock, Fife, Scotland
- Newbigging, South Lanarkshire, Scotland

== People surnamed Newbigging ==
- David Newbigging (born 1934), British businessman
- John Steuart Newbigging (1809–1849), Scottish lawyer
- Patrick Newbigging (1813–1864), Scottish surgeon
- Sandy Newbigging (1876–1976), Scottish footballer for Nottingham Forest, Rangers, Reading
- Willie Newbigging (1874–1954), Scottish footballer for Tottenham, Fulham – brother of Sandy
- William Newbigging (1773–1852), Scottish surgeon – father of John and Patrick

== See also ==
- Newbiggin (disambiguation)
