= Dolphinton railway station =

Dolphinton railway station may refer to:

- Dolphinton railway station (Caledonian Railway), a railway station in Dolphinton, South Lanarkshire, Scotland from 1867 to 1945
- Dolphinton railway station (North British Railway), a railway station in Dolphinton, South Lanarkshire, Scotland from 1864 to 1933
