= Newbigging railway station =

Disused railway station in Newbigging, South Lanarkshire, Scotland

Newbigging
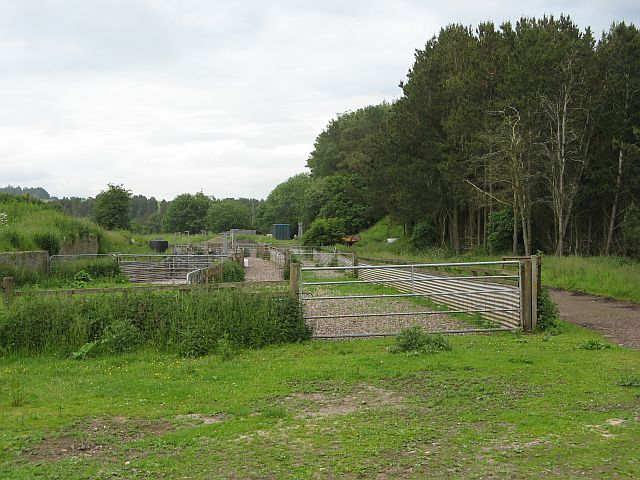
- The site of the station in 2007

General information
- Location: Newbigging, South Lanarkshire; Scotland
- Coordinates: 55.6892°N 3.5595°W
- Grid reference: NT020450
- Platforms: 1

Other information
- Status: Disused

History
- Original company: Caledonian Railway
- Post-grouping: LNER

Key dates
- 1 March 1867: Opened
- 12 September 1932: Closed
- 17 July 1933: Reopened
- 4 June 1945: Closed permanently
Location

Newbigging railway station served the hamlet of Newbigging, South Lanarkshire, Scotland from 1867 to 1945 on the Dolphinton branch.

== History ==
The station opened on 1 March 1867 by the Caledonian Railway. To the north was the goods yard and further north were two railway cottages. The station closed on 12 September 1932 but reopened on 17 July 1933, before closing permanently on 4 June 1945.

| Preceding station | Disused railways | Following station |
|---|---|---|
| Bankhead; Line and station closed | Dolphinton branch | Dunsyre; Line and station closed |
