= Dunsyre railway station =

Disused railway station in Dunsyre, South Lanarkshire, Scotland

Coordinates: 55.7174°N 3.4746°W

Dunsyre
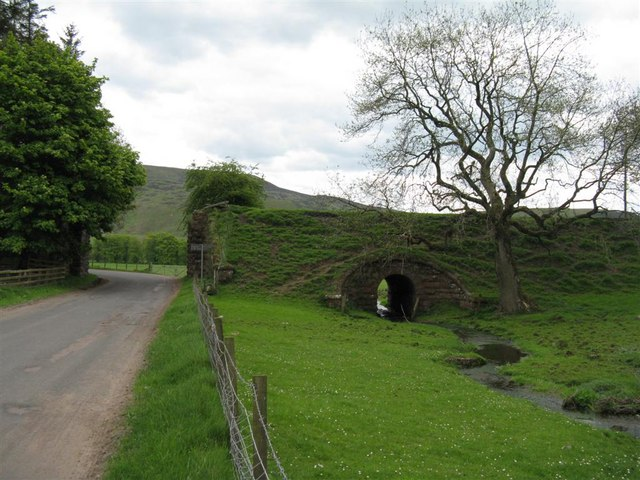
- The site of the station in 2008

General information
- Location: Dunsyre, South Lanarkshire; Scotland
- Platforms: 1

Other information
- Status: Disused

History
- Original company: Caledonian Railway
- Post-grouping: LNER

Key dates
- 1 March 1867: Opened
- 12 September 1932: Closed
- 17 July 1933: Reopened
- 4 June 1945: Closed
Location

Dunsyre railway station served the village of Dunsyre, South Lanarkshire, Scotland from 1867 to 1945 on the Dolphinton branch.

== History ==
The station opened on 1 March 1867 by the Caledonian Railway. To the north was the goods yard. The station closed on 12 September 1932 but reopened on 17 July 1933 before closing permanently on 4 June 1945.

Preceding station	Disused railways	Following station
Newbigging; Line and station closed	Dolphinton branch	Dolphinton (CR); Line and station closed
