= Macbie Hill railway station =

Disused railway station in Coalyburn, Scottish Borders

Macbie Hill

General information
- Location: Coalyburn, Peeblesshire; Scotland
- Coordinates: 55.7605°N 3.3019°W
- Grid reference: NT184526
- Platforms: 1

Other information
- Status: Disused

History
- Original company: Leadburn, Linton and Dolphinton Railway
- Pre-grouping: North British Railway
- Post-grouping: LNER

Key dates
- 4 July 1864: Opened as Coalyburn
- 25 May 1874: Name changed to Macbie Hill
- 1 April 1933: Closed
Location

Macbie Hill railway station served the hamlet of Coalyburn, Peeblesshire, Scotland, from 1864 to 1933 on the Leadburn, Linton and Dolphinton Railway.

== History ==
The station opened as Coalyburn on 4 July 1864 by the Leadburn, Linton and Dolphinton Railway. The Coalyburn mines were to the north as well as quarries, some to the south. The station's name was changed to Coalyburn (Macbie Hill) in the timetables in October 1872, but it was officially changed to Macbie Hill on 25 May 1874, being named after the local Macbiehill House. There was a station building on the north side of the line and opposite this was a goods siding. The station became an unstaffed halt on 1 December 1930 and closed on 1 April 1933.

Preceding station	Disused railways	Following station
Broomlee; Line and station closed	Leadburn, Linton and Dolphinton Railway	Lamancha; Line and station closed
