= Bankhead railway station (Lanarkshire) =

Disused railway station in Rutherglen, South Lanarkshire, Scotland

Coordinates: 55.68469°N 3.62130°W

Bankhead

General information
- Location: Bankhead, South Lanarkshire; Scotland
- Platforms: 1

Other information
- Status: Disused

History
- Original company: Caledonian Railway
- Post-grouping: LNER

Key dates
- November 1867: Opened
- 12 September 1932: Closed
- 17 July 1933: Reopened
- 4 June 1945: Closed permanently
Location

Bankhead railway station served the isolated settlement of Bankhead, east of Carstairs Junction in South Lanarkshire, Scotland from 1867 to 1945 on the Dolphinton branch.

== History ==
The station opened in November 1867 by the Caledonian Railway. To the north was a goods yard with one siding. A signal box was built in 1887 which closed in 1934. The station closed on 12 September 1932 but reopened on 17 July 1933, only to close again on 4 June 1945.

Preceding station	Historical railways	Following station
Carstairs; Line closed, station open	Dolphinton branch	Newbigging; Line and station closed
