= Dolphinton railway station (North British Railway) =

Disused railway station in Dolphinton, Lanarkshire

Dolphinton

General information
- Location: Dolphinton, Lanarkshire; Scotland
- Coordinates: 55.7158°N 3.4119°W
- Grid reference: NT113478
- Platforms: 2

Other information
- Status: Disused

History
- Original company: North British Railway
- Pre-grouping: North British Railway
- Post-grouping: LNER

Key dates
- 4 July 1864: Opened
- 1 April 1933: Closed
Location

Dolphinton (North British Railway) railway station served the village of Dolphinton, Lanarkshire, Scotland from 1864 to 1933 on the Leadburn, Linton and Dolphinton Railway. There was another separate station in Dolphinton served by trains of the Caledonian Railway from 1867 to 1945.

== History ==
The station opened on 4 July 1864 by the North British Railway. There was a stone built locomotive shed nearby. The station closed to both passengers and goods traffic on 1 April 1933.

Preceding station	Disused railways	Following station
Terminus	Leadburn, Linton and Dolphinton Railway	Broomlee; Line and station closed
