= Lamancha railway station =

Disused railway station in Lamancha, Scottish Borders

Coordinates: 55.7617°N 3.2649°W

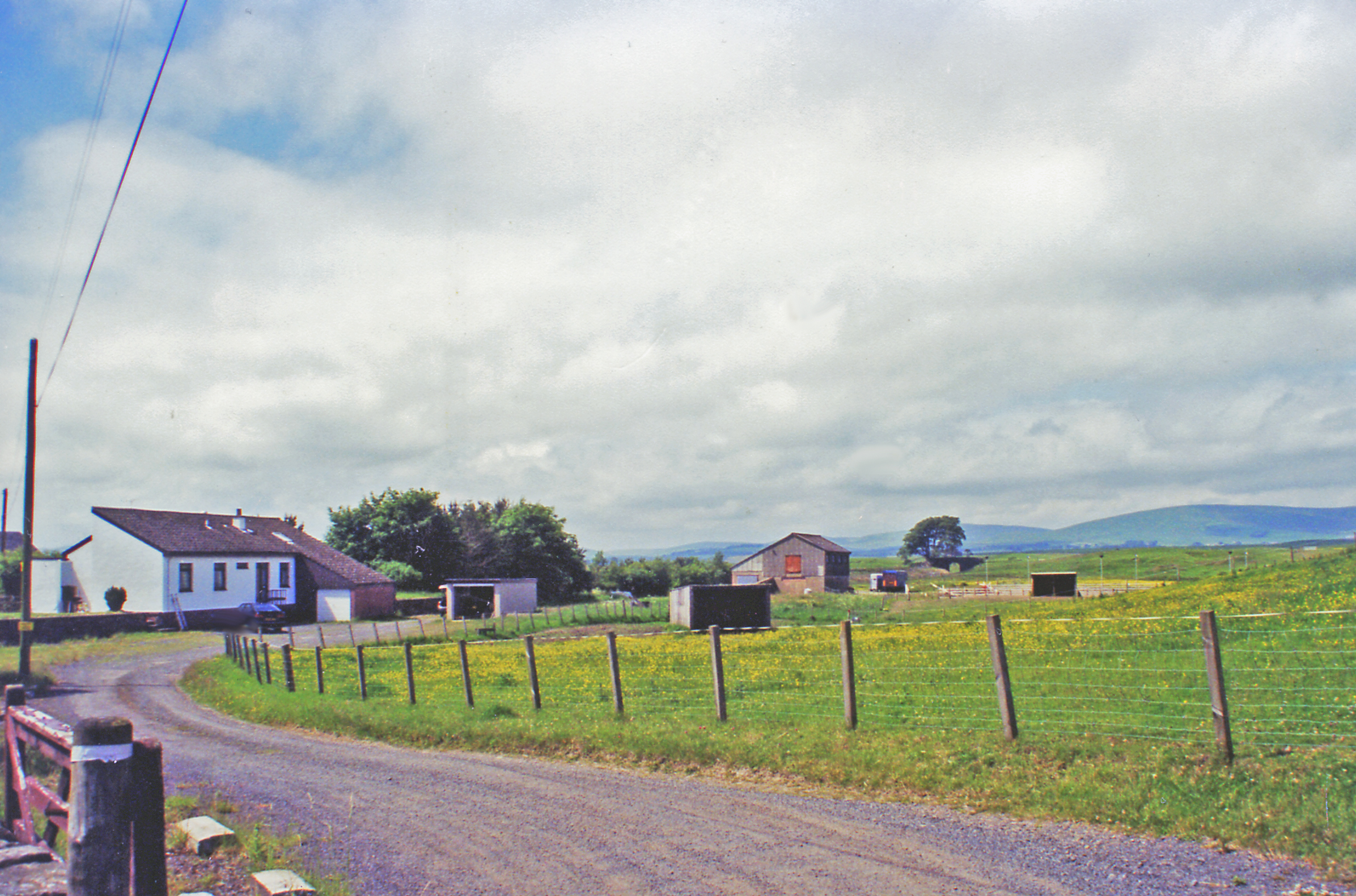
- The site of the station, looking west towards Dolphinton, in 2000

General information
- Location: Lamancha, Peeblesshire; Scotland
- Platforms: 1

Other information
- Status: Disused

History
- Original company: Leadburn, Linton and Dolphinton Railway
- Pre-grouping: North British Railway
- Post-grouping: LNER

Key dates
- 4 July 1864: Opened
- 1 April 1933: Closed
Location

Lamancha railway station served the hamlet of Lamancha, Peeblesshire, Scotland, from 1864 to 1933 on the Leadburn, Linton and Dolphinton Railway.

== History ==
The station opened on 4 July 1864 by the Leadburn, Linton and Dolphinton Railway. Opposite was a goods siding with another serving a loading bank and to the south was the station building. The station closed on 1 April 1933.

Preceding station	Disused railways	Following station
Macbie Hill; Line and station closed	Leadburn, Linton and Dolphinton Railway	Leadburn; Line and station closed
