= Dolphinton railway station (Caledonian Railway) =

Disused railway station in Dolphinton, Lanarkshire

Dolphinton

General information
- Location: Dolphinton, Lanarkshire; Scotland
- Coordinates: 55.7161°N 3.4149°W
- Grid reference: NT112478
- Platforms: 1

Other information
- Status: Disused

History
- Original company: Caledonian Railway
- Pre-grouping: Caledonian Railway
- Post-grouping: London, Midland and Scottish Railway

Key dates
- 1 March 1867: Opened
- 12 September 1932: Closed
- 17 July 1933: Reopened
- 4 June 1945: Closed permanently
Location

Dolphinton railway station served the village of Dolphinton, Lanarkshire, Scotland, from 1867 to 1945 on the Dolphinton branch.

== History ==
The station opened on 1 March 1867, by the Caledonian Railway. To the east was the goods yard where a shed was built in 1906. It closed in 1915. The station closed on 12 September 1932 but reopened on 17 July 1933. The shed was removed around this time. The station closed permanently on 4 June 1945. Only part of the platform remains, but the goods yard is now the site of housing.

| Preceding station | Disused railways | Following station |
|---|---|---|
| Dunsyre; Line and station closed | Dolphinton branch | Terminus |
