= Broomlee railway station =

Disused railway station in West Linton, Scottish Borders

Broomlee
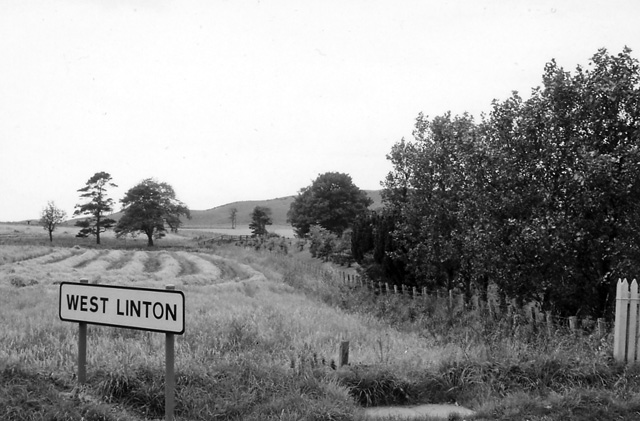
- Station site, 1974

General information
- Location: West Linton, Peeblesshire; Scotland
- Coordinates: 55.745415°N 3.346431°W
- Grid reference: NT155510
- Platforms: 1

Other information
- Status: Disused

History
- Original company: Leadburn, Linton and Dolphinton Railway
- Pre-grouping: North British Railway
- Post-grouping: LNER

Key dates
- 4 July 1864: Opened as West Linton
- October 1864: Name changed to Broomlee
- 1 April 1933: Closed
Location

Broomlee railway station served the village of West Linton, Peeblesshire, Scotland, from 1864 to 1933 on the Leadburn, Linton and Dolphinton Railway.

== History ==
The station opened as West Linton on 4 July 1864 by the Leadburn, Linton and Dolphinton Railway. It was also known as Broomlee for West Linton in the NBR and LMS timetables. On the north side of the platform was the station building and the goods yard, which was on the opposite side of the level crossing, had sidings to the north and the south. The station's name was changed to Broomlee to avoid confusion with another station of the same name. The signal box, which was opened in 1895, was to the northeast of the station building. The station closed on 3 May 1933.

Preceding station	Historical railways	Following station
Dolphinton; Line and station closed	Leadburn, Linton and Dolphinton Railway	Macbie Hill; Line and station closed
