= Linton Hotspur F.C. =

Association football club in Scotland

Linton Hotspur
- Full name: Linton Hotspur Football Club
- Nicknames: Spurs; Hotspurs
- Founded: 2008, 17 years ago
- Ground: New Moor Road, West Linton
- Capacity: 1,000 (63 seated)
- Coordinates: 55°45′19″N 3°20′36″W
- Chairman: Campbell Forsyth
- Manager: Ruairidh Fleming & Paul Currie
- League: East of Scotland League Second Division
- 2025–26: East of Scotland League Second Division, 10th of 15
- Website: lintonhotspur.squarespace.com
Home colours	Away colours

Linton Hotspur Football Club are a Scottish football club based in the village of West Linton in the Scottish Borders. They play their matches at New Moor Road, West Linton.

Initially an amateur side, the club now plays in the East of Scotland Football League Second Division after admission in 2023. The first team is currently managed by Ruairidh Fleming & Paul Currie.

== History ==
=== Early history and disbandment ===
Linton Hotspur Football Club was founded in the 1920s and was amongst the oldest amateur football clubs in Peeblesshire. In 1971, however, the club decided to disband after a 12-2 thrashing by Ferranti Thistle.

=== Re-establishment ===
In 2008, almost four decades after its disbandment, a meeting at the local public house gathered enough support to re-establish Linton Hotspur. A year later, the club was granted membership to the Border Amateur Football League, playing their first game since 1971.

Over the next decade, travel constraints and poor form led to the club leaving the Borders League to join the Lothian and Edinburgh Amateur Football Association in 2018/19. This move relieved pressure on the existing squad and broadened the appeal of the club to players in the latter region.

In 2022, Hotspurs reached the final of the South of Scotland Amateur Cup, losing 3-1 to Lesmahagow Amateurs F.C.

=== Entering the Scottish pyramid ===
The following year, the club was then admitted to the EoSFL Third Division, playing its first fixture against West Calder United F.C. on July 29, 2023. Chris King was appointed manager in August 2023 and led Linton Hotspur to a 10th place out of 11 finish in their first season in the 2023-24 East of Scotland Third Division.

After a successful start to the 2024-25 season, Dunbar United appointed Chris King and Scott Gibson, both of which previously played at the club. On February 14th 2025, Paul Currie and Ruairidh Fleming were appointed co-managers with Kenny Hall as assistant manager. They were joined by interim head coaches Ben Gilmour & Drew Sanson, involved under previous management.

After defeating Lochgelly Albert 2-1 at New Moor Road, Linton Hotspur were promoted to the East of Scotland Second Division for the first time in their history.

== Stadium ==
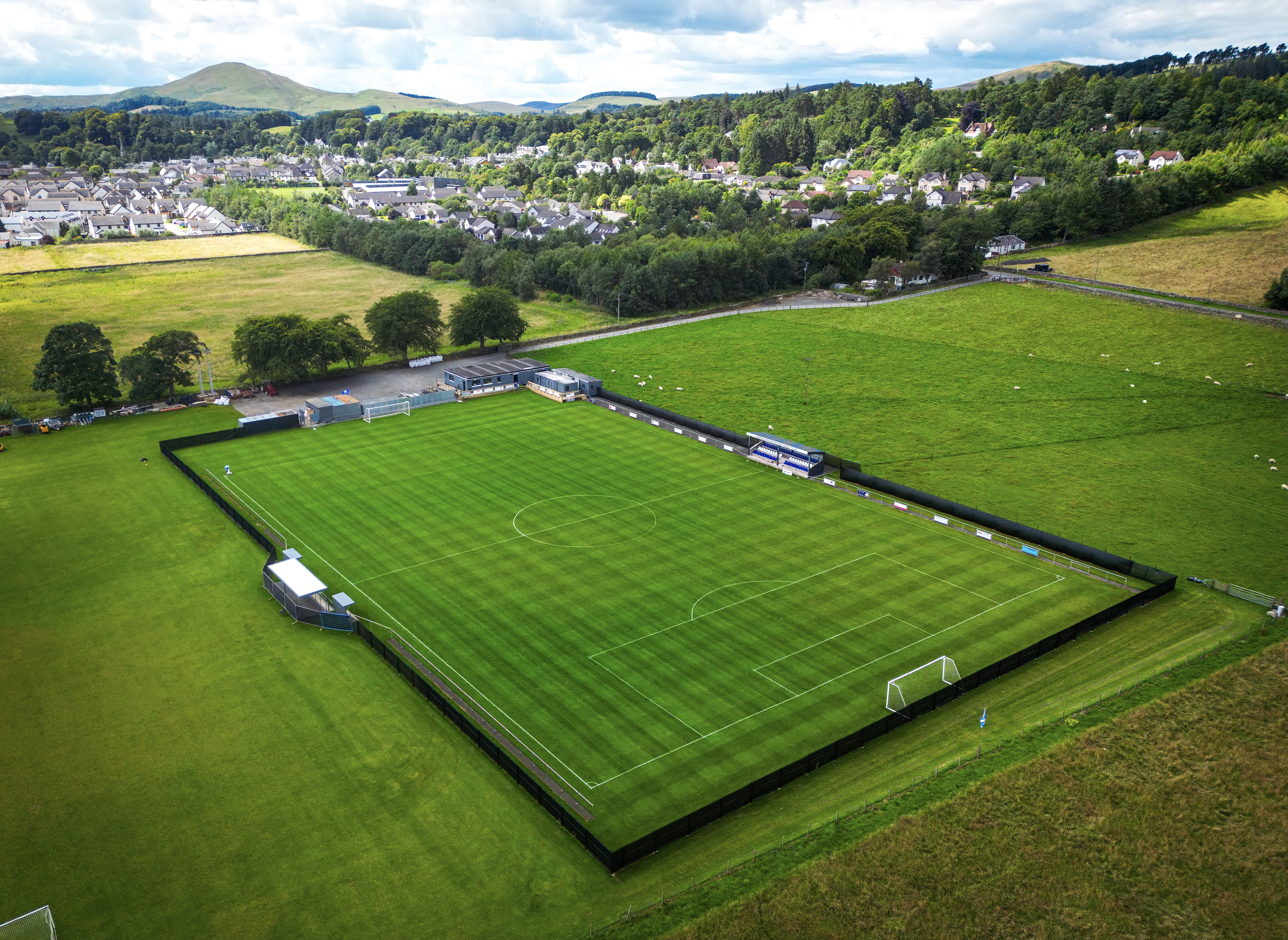
New Moor Road in 2023

Linton Hotspur plays at New Moor Road, a small ground to the east of the village.

Soon after reform, the club settled on the village's football pitch as a home ground, with subsequent fundraising accruing £20,000 to be spent on dressing rooms. However, the construction of a new primary school on these premises necessitated the search for a new ground. In 2012, after further fundraising, landowners from the village agreed to lease a nearby field, which in turn was purchased by a local businessman two years later and leased back to the club for 99 years.

Since securing this location, the club committee has steadily upgraded it via fundraising and grants. It now boasts a pavilion including kitchen and communal facilities, dressing and shower rooms, and a small stand that holds 63 people.

== Club staff ==
=== Corporate staff ===
Role	Name
Chairman	(Scotland) Campbell Forsyth
Vice Chairman	(Scotland) Ivan Mackenzie
Club Secretary	(Scotland) Lindsay Swan

=== Coaching staff ===
Role	Name
Co-Manager	(Scotland) Ruairidh Kennedy
Co-Manager	(Scotland) Paul Currie
Assistant Manager	(Scotland) Kenny Hall
