= Patrick Newbigging =

Scottish surgeon and general practitioner

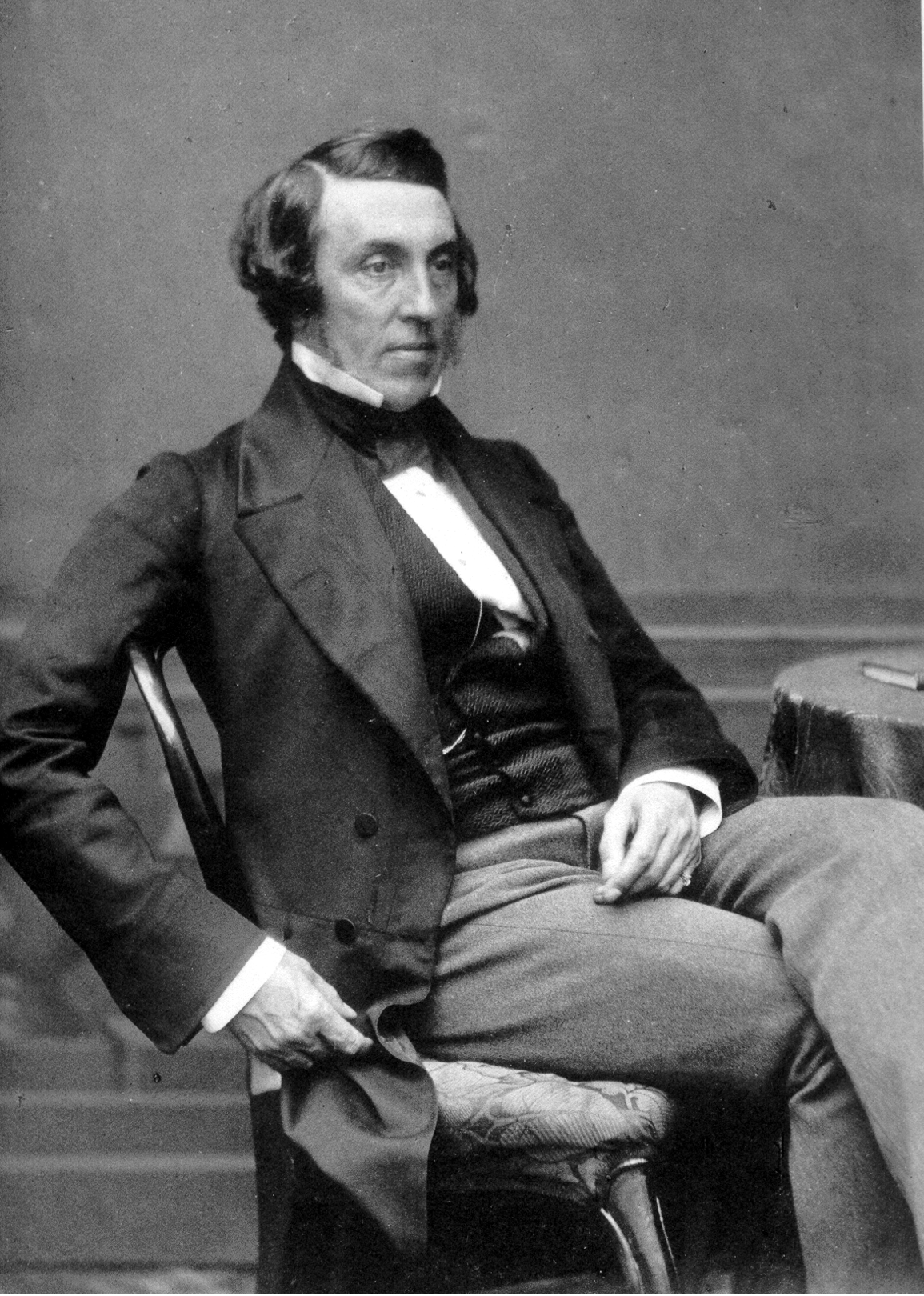
Patrick Newbigging

Patrick Small Keir Newbigging FRSE FRSSA FRCSE (1813–1864) was a Scottish surgeon and general practitioner. He was President of the Royal Medical Society and of the Royal Scottish Society of Arts. Together with his father, Sir William Newbigging he formed one of the few father-son pairs of former Presidents of the Royal College of Surgeons of Edinburgh. His observations on the origin of the heart sounds and of the apex beat of the heart made a significant contribution to the debate.

== Early life ==
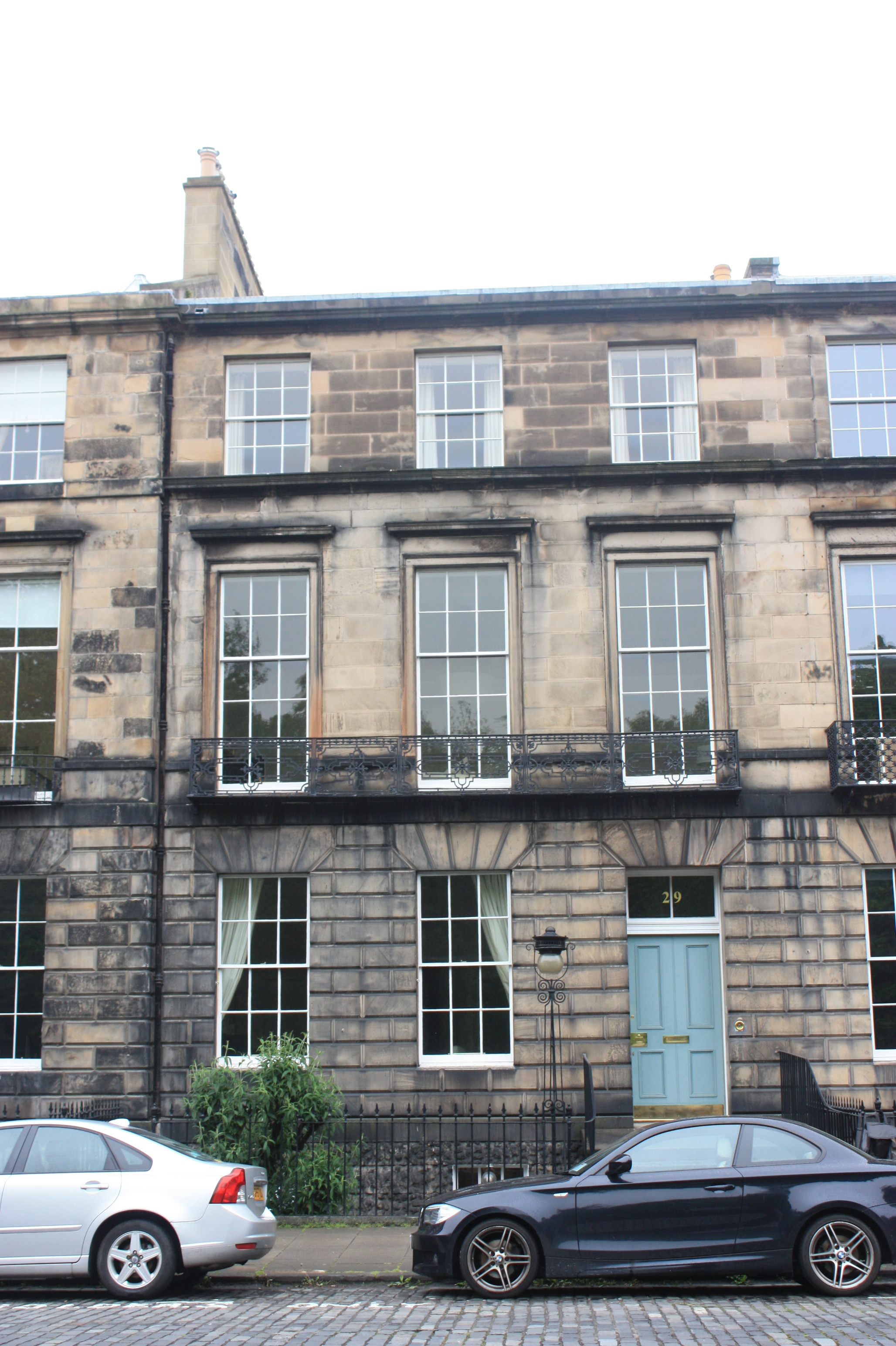
29 Heriot Row, Edinburgh

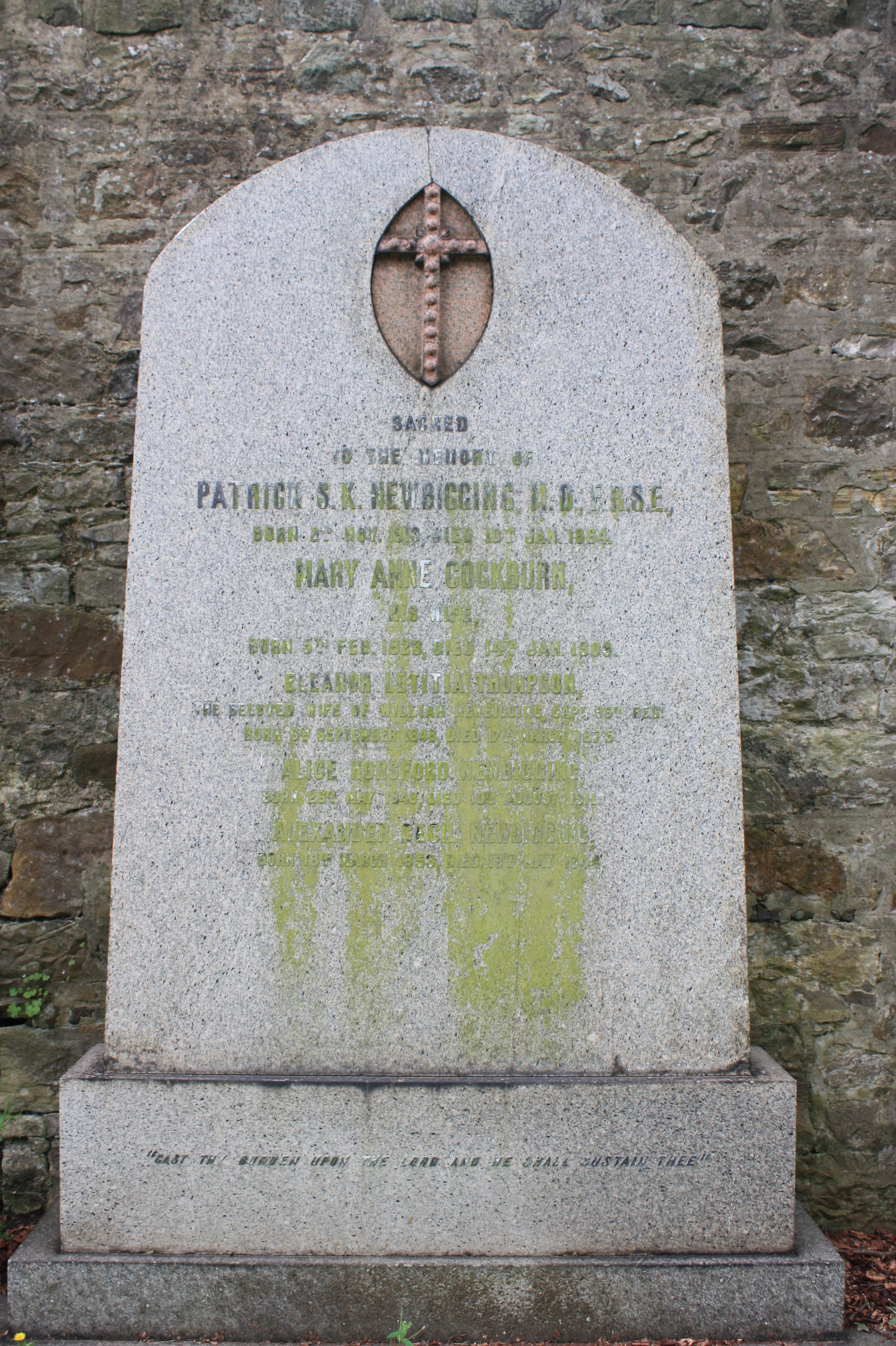
The grave of Patrick Newbigging, Dean Cemetery, Edinburgh

He was born at 18 St Andrew Square in Edinburgh's New Town the son of Lilias Steuart and her husband, the Edinburgh surgeon Sir William Newbigging.

He studied medicine at the University of Edinburgh. While a student he joined the Royal Medical Society and gave a dissertation to the Society in 1833 on the origin of heart sounds and pulsations. In this he suggested that the apex beat was produced by ventricular systole and not diastole as had been suggested by William Stokes and Dominic Corrigan and was the prevalent view at the time. He received his doctorate (MD), in 1834, writing his thesis on the same topic, under the title On the causes of the impulse and sounds of the heart. He became a Fellow of the Royal College of Surgeons of Edinburgh in the same year and was elected President of the Royal Medical Society in 1835.

== Medical career ==
Before settling into practice in Edinburgh he made a tour of medical centres in Europe, promoting his ideas on auscultation of the heart. He then joined his father in general practice in Edinburgh and was elected a medical officer to the New Town Dispensary. He was medical officer to John Watson's Institution, to Cauvin's Hospital and was one of the original physicians to the Sick Children's Hospital in Edinburgh. In 1845 he was elected a member of the Harveian Society of Edinburgh and the Aesculapian Club. In 1847 he translated the Practical Treatise on Auscultation written by Jean Baptiste Barth and Henri-Louis Roger.

== Offices held ==
In 1848 he was elected a Fellow of the Royal Society of Edinburgh. His proposer was William Pulteney Alison. In 1850 he was elected a Fellow of the Royal Scottish Society of the Arts and served as their President from 1861 to 1862. His father, Sir William Newbigging had been President of the Royal College of Surgeons of Edinburgh from 1814 to 1816. Patrick Newbigging followed in his father's footsteps serving as President of the Royal College of Surgeons of Edinburgh from 1861 to 1863.

== Latter years and death ==
In his final years he lived at 29 Heriot Row in the New Town in Edinburgh, facing Queen Street Gardens.

He died on 10 January 1864 and is buried with his wife in Dean Cemetery. The grave in section R plot 55 lies against the wall on the south-west spur from the cemetery.

== Family ==
Newbigging was married to Mary Anne Cockburn (1823–1909). They had twin daughters, Eleanor Letitia Newbigging (later Thompson) (1848–1875) and Alice Horsford Newbigging (1848–1911). They had one son, Alexander Cecil Newbigging (1853–1944).

His older brother John Steuart Newbigging became a Writer to the Signet. He was sheriff-clerk of Roxburghshire from 1841 to 1849 and died in office. Two other brothers studied medicine. Robert Newbigging, a President of the Royal Medical Society, died in office during the 1832-3 session. George Stewart Newbigging, graduated MD from the University of Edinburgh in 1837 became FRCSE the same year.
