= Henri-Louis Roger =

French pediatrician (1809–1891)

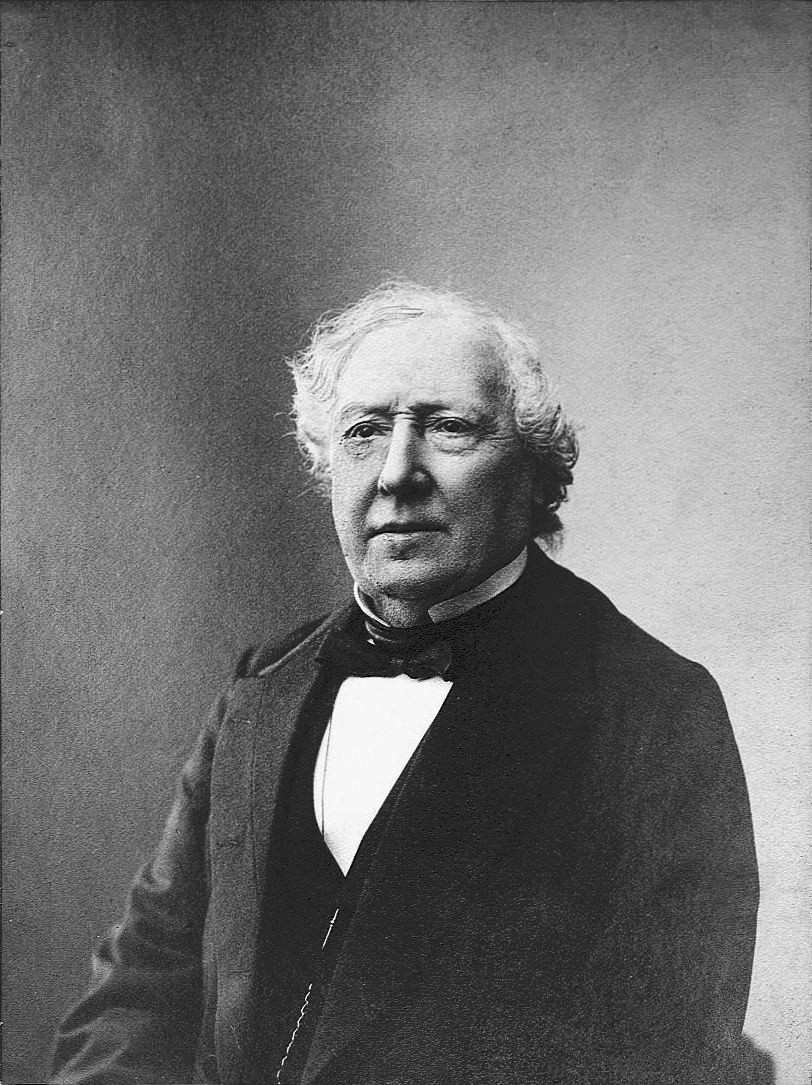
Henri-Louis Roger

Henri-Louis Roger (6 January 1809 – 15 November 1891) was a French pediatrician born in Paris.

He studied medicine in Paris, earning his doctorate in 1839 with a dissertation on auscultation titled De l'auscultation et se valeur semiologique. In 1847 he became agrégé at the medical faculty of Paris, and from 1860 was associated with the Hôpital Sainte-Eugénie. Here he focused his efforts on post-mortem investigations of children. In 1862 he became a member of the Académie de Médecine.

In addition to his work in pediatrics, he is remembered for contributions made involving cardiological issues. His name is lent to two eponymous terms: Maladie de Roger (Roger's disease), which is a small congenital asymptomatic ventricular septal defect (VSD), and bruit de Roger (Roger's murmur), which is a loud pansystolic murmur of a ventricular septal defect.

With pathologist Jean Baptiste Barth (1806-1877), Roger published works on auscultation, including "A Manual of Auscultation and Percussion" and "A Practical Treatise on Auscultation"; both being translated into English by Patrick Newbigging.
