= West Linton =

Coordinates: 55.7526°N 3.3554°W

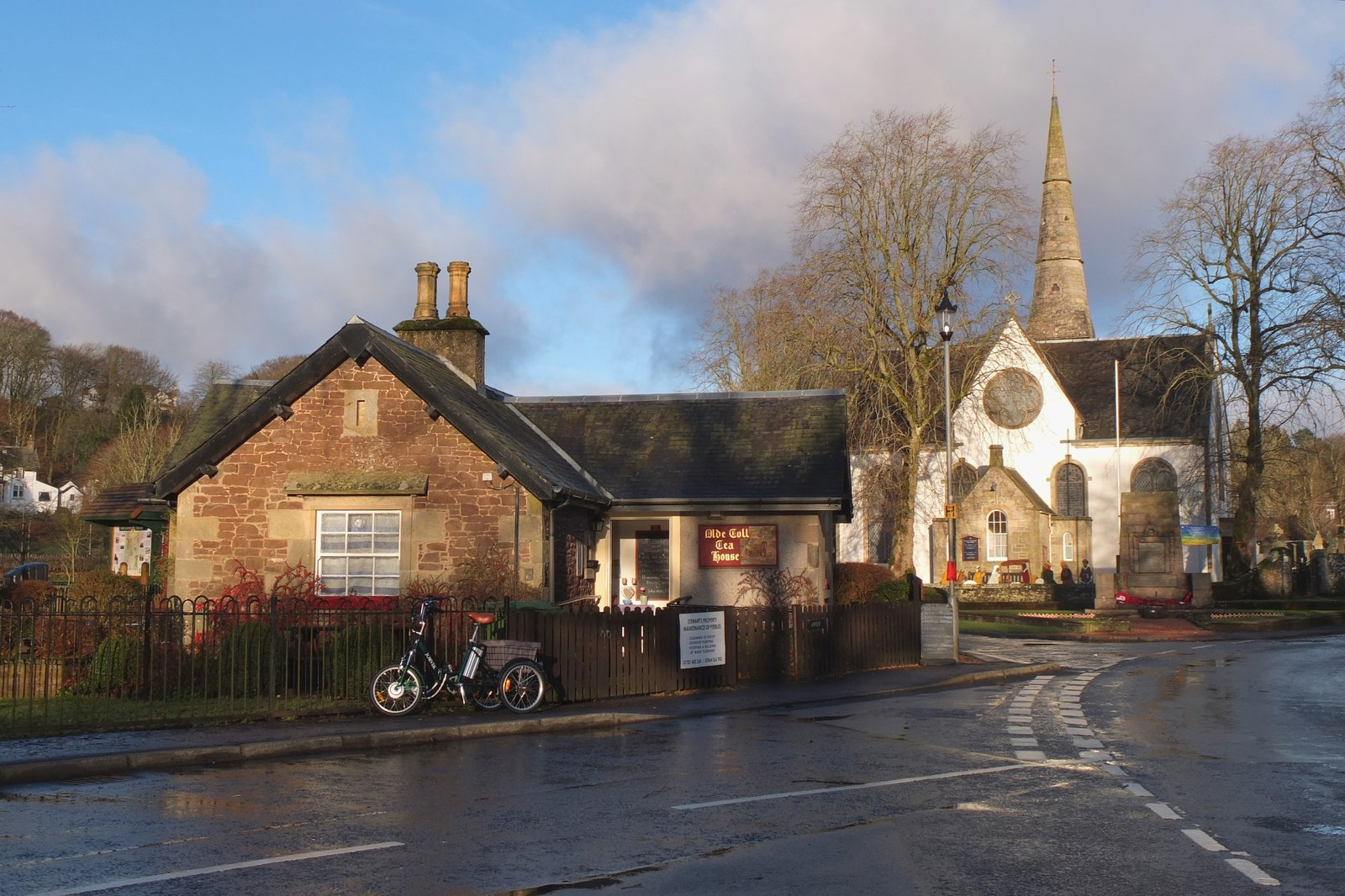
- Old Toll House and St Andrew's Church, near the village centre

- Location within the Scottish Borders
- Population: 1,920 (2020)
- OS grid reference: NT152515
  - Edinburgh: 16 miles (26 km)
- Civil parish: West Linton
- Council area: Scottish Borders
- Lieutenancy area: Tweeddale
- Country: Scotland
- Sovereign state: United Kingdom
- Post town: WEST LINTON
- Postcode district: EH46
- Dialling code: 01968
- Police: Scotland
- Fire: Scottish
- Ambulance: Scottish
- UK Parliament: Dumfriesshire, Clydesdale and Tweeddale
- Scottish Parliament: Midlothian South, Tweeddale and Lauderdale

West Linton (Scottish Gaelic: Baile Linne Ruairidh) is a village and civil parish in southern Scotland, on the A702. It is situated within the historic county of Peeblesshire and the Scottish Borders council area. Many of its residents are commuters, owing to the village's proximity to Edinburgh, which is 16 miles (26 km) to the north-east. West Linton has a long history, and holds an annual traditional festival called the Whipman Play.

== Prehistory and archaeology ==
There is considerable evidence of the pre-historic occupation of the area. A right-of-way through the foothills of the Pentland Hills follows an important pre-historic routeway linking the upper Clyde Valley with the estuary of the River Forth. It is marked in this section by two large Bronze Age cairns, one of them being the best preserved example of its kind in the country. In 1994, a Bronze Age cemetery was excavated at the Westwater Reservoir. Significant artefacts were discovered, including several beakers and an important lead necklace.

Archaeological work between 1993 and 1998 at Siller Holes, West Linton, found evidence of lead mining from the 12th to 14th centuries. Documented reference to the site only occurred in the late 16th century, so it is unknown who was undertaking the mining.

== History ==
The village is of ancient origin. It was historically named Linton Roderick, Linton Rutherick and Linton, the latter meaning "town on the lin or pool", presumably referring to its location on the Lyne Water. At some point, the village was renamed to West Linton in order to distinguish it from East Linton in East Lothian.

West Linton's development was influenced by its position along historic routes through Tweeddale and the Pentland Hills, linking the upper Clyde Valley with the River Forth basin.

During the medieval period, the surrounding area formed part of estates associated with local landowning families, and the economy was primarily agricultural. Archaeological evidence indicates that lead mining was an important activity from at least the 12th century, particularly in the surrounding upland areas such as Siller Holes, where mining continued into the later medieval period.

By the early modern period, West Linton had developed into a small rural settlement serving nearby farms and mining communities. Significant growth occurred during the 18th and 19th centuries, when improvements in road infrastructure and the introduction of turnpike routes enhanced trade and movement through the area. Weaving, quarrying and mining provided employment, while the construction of the nearby Broomlee railway station strengthened connections with Edinburgh and the wider Borders region.

Although the railway line closed in 1933, West Linton continued to evolve throughout the 20th century, with the decline of local industries accompanied by a gradual transition toward residential development and increased commuting to Edinburgh.

== Climate ==
As a part of the British Isles, West Linton experiences a maritime climate with cool summers and mild winters. West Linton can be prone to notably low temperatures. Contributing factors include its location in a valley and the relatively elevated position of the village centre at approximately 230m above sea level. It has recorded a number of British low temperature date records, such as -21.8 °C on 12 January 1982, -11.7 °C on 1 April 1917, -10.0 °C on 30 October 1926 and -18.3 °C on 16 November 1919.

Climate data for Blyth Bridge 253m asl, 1971-2000, extremes 1960- (Weather station 4 miles (6 km) to the South of West Linton)
Month	Jan	Feb	Mar	Apr	May	Jun	Jul	Aug	Sep	Oct	Nov	Dec	Year
Record high °C (°F)	13.0 (55.4)	14.4 (57.9)	17.8 (64.0)	24.4 (75.9)	26.0 (78.8)	27.7 (81.9)	28.4 (83.1)	28.5 (83.3)	25.5 (77.9)	19.4 (66.9)	15.4 (59.7)	12.6 (54.7)	28.5 (83.3)
Mean daily maximum °C (°F)	4.8 (40.6)	5.2 (41.4)	7.2 (45.0)	9.7 (49.5)	13.2 (55.8)	15.6 (60.1)	17.8 (64.0)	17.2 (63.0)	14.2 (57.6)	11.0 (51.8)	7.3 (45.1)	5.6 (42.1)	10.7 (51.3)
Mean daily minimum °C (°F)	−0.6 (30.9)	−0.2 (31.6)	0.9 (33.6)	2.2 (36.0)	4.6 (40.3)	7.4 (45.3)	9.5 (49.1)	9.3 (48.7)	7.4 (45.3)	4.8 (40.6)	1.6 (34.9)	0.1 (32.2)	3.9 (39.0)
Record low °C (°F)	−21.5 (−6.7)	−16.7 (1.9)	−17.7 (0.1)	−7.9 (17.8)	−4.4 (24.1)	−1.1 (30.0)	−0.1 (31.8)	1.0 (33.8)	−4.3 (24.3)	−7.5 (18.5)	−12.2 (10.0)	−16.3 (2.7)	−21.5 (−6.7)
Average precipitation mm (inches)	88.79 (3.50)	64.99 (2.56)	75.77 (2.98)	53.45 (2.10)	54.98 (2.16)	63.63 (2.51)	63.7 (2.51)	74.65 (2.94)	84.41 (3.32)	92.18 (3.63)	90.02 (3.54)	94.57 (3.72)	901.14 (35.47)
Source: Royal Dutch Meteorological Institute/KNMI

== Village Greens ==
West Linton has two village greens, the Lower Green to the south and the Upper Green to the north, the land for which was granted to the inhabitants in perpetuity by the feudal Lord, the Earl of March. In 1729, there was objection on the part of a section of the congregation to the enforced settlement of the minister, and, on the day of ordination in 1731, "riotous scenes" were reported. Soldiers were sent to restore order, and as they forded the river at the Lower Green, they were pelted with stones by the indignant villagers, several of whom were taken to Edinburgh to answer for their disorderly conduct.

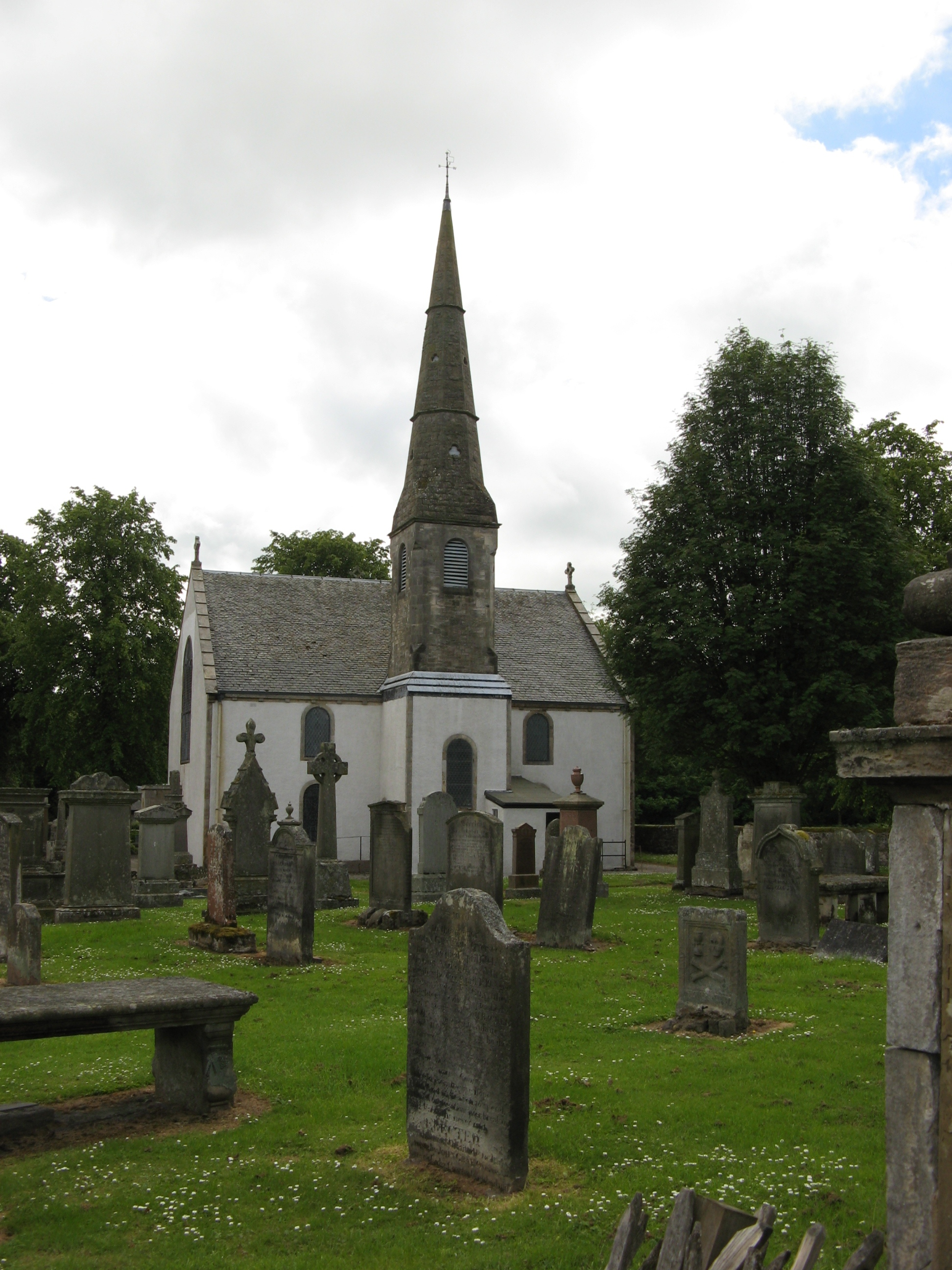
St Andrew's Parish Church

== Kirks and folk ==
Adjacent to the Lower Green is the parish church of St. Andrew, flanked by the old graveyard in which stood the original church and manse. In 1780, plans were approved for a new church to be built on the old manse glebe, the minister to be compensated for the loss of his land by the addition of twelve shillings to his stipend. A new manse was built on the glebe land which had been acquired south of the river and in 1782 the new church itself was completed. In 1871, it was enlarged, the roof being raised to accommodate the gallery, larger windows were installed and the spire added. In the succeeding years, the wood carvings executed by two local ladies, Miss Jane Fergusson of Spitalhaugh, and Mrs Wodropp of Garvald, were added to the interior walls and gallery. Of note in the graveyard are two bee-boles in the boundary wall in which ministers living in the old manse would place their skeps.

St Mungo's Scottish Episcopal Church sits at the top of the hill overlooking this Green.

== Rail and road ==
The village was formerly served by Broomlee railway station on the Leadburn to Dolphinton branch line, designed by Thomas Bouch (who was also responsible for the ill-fated Tay Bridge). The station has been closed since 1933, but remnants can still be found to this day.

Built in 1864 to facilitate mining and quarrying activities in the area, it was linked to the Peebles Railway. Although these industries declined, the line led to the expansion of the village to accommodate people from Edinburgh who may have had summer country retreats or decided to settle in the village permanently, either commuting back to Edinburgh or retiring in the village.

At the southern end of Main Street near St. Andrew's Parish Church lies the old toll house, built in the early nineteenth century at the entrance to the village on the Blyth Bridge to Carlops turnpike road. Tolls were levied on travellers, including the many drovers and their animals passing through the district. The ticket issued entitled the purchaser to pass free of charge through other districts provided they did so on the same day, but anyone attempting to bypass the toll could be fined twenty shillings if caught, and there were also severe penalties for those convicted of damaging or destroying a toll house. Today, the old toll house is used as a café.

== Merchants and craftsmen ==
At the end of the eighteenth century, there were between twenty and thirty looms in the village, rising to about eighty in the early nineteenth century, some weaving household goods but most weaving cotton cloth for Edinburgh and Glasgow merchants.

It is estimated that in 1834 about fifty hands worked in the mines and quarries of the area. There were collieries near Carlops and Macbiehill, the latter operating until recent times; also quarries producing limestone for agricultural purposes. In 1834, there were five tailors in the village, four dressmakers, two butchers, five carriers, nine retailers of meal, groceries and spirits, two surgeons and four innkeepers.

== Notable residents ==
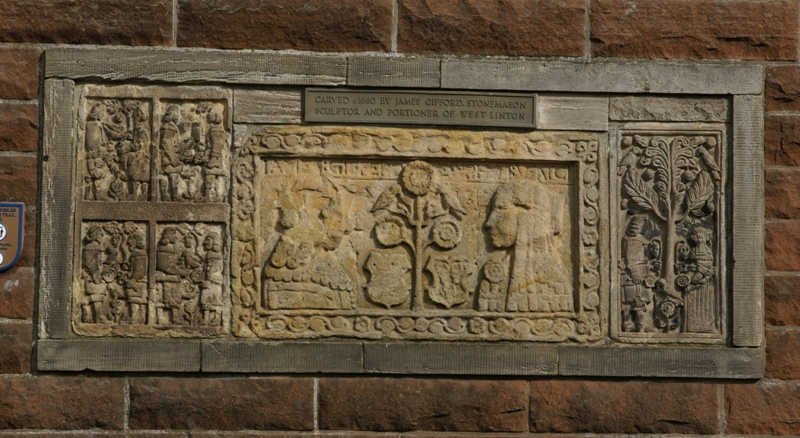
Gifford's Stone, carved around 1660 by local mason James Gifford, on a house on the Main Street

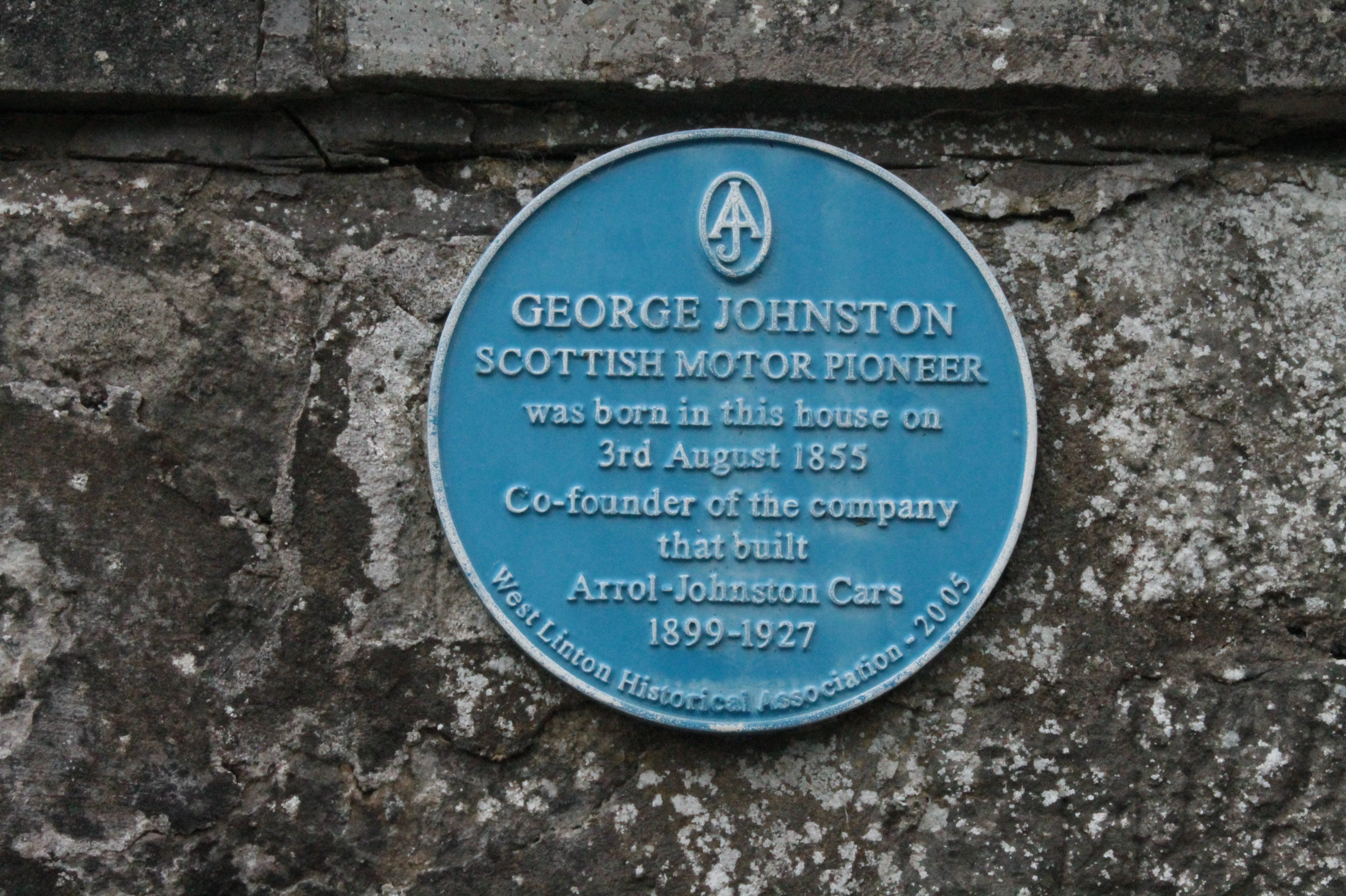
Plaque to George Johnston (b.1855) in West Linton

Although West Linton has never played a significant part in the history of the country, several eminent men have taken up residence in the area. Early in the nineteenth century, John Hay Forbes (1776–1854) was raised to the bench with the title of Lord Medwyn, the name of the estate he had earlier purchased. This association with the Court of Session was maintained in the twentieth century by the Hon. Lord Henry Wallace Guthrie (1903–1970), one of the youngest judges to be appointed to the College of Justice. Fergusson Place perpetuates the memory of Sir William Fergusson of Spitalhaugh (1808–1877), surgeon to Queen Victoria.

The sculptor William Mossman was born here, as was the mathematician, John Brown Clark.

Robert Sanderson (1836–1902), the "Laureate of Lynedale", wrote poems and sketches celebrating the Lyne valley, and his handsome tomb erected by his friends may be seen in the graveyard. The monument and low-relief portrait head is an early work by sculptor Pilkington Jackson.

George Meikle Kemp (1795–1844), the architect of the Scott Monument in Edinburgh, lived for a time near Dolphinton and came to school in the village.

The composer Ronald Stevenson (1928–2015) resided in West Linton. His daughters, actress Gerda Stevenson and musician Savourna Stevenson, also grew up in the village.

Athlete Chris O'Hare is from the village; he has represented both Team Scotland at the 2014 Commonwealth Games in Glasgow and Team GB at the 2016 Summer Olympics in Rio de Janeiro.

George Johnston, owner of the first motorcar in Scotland and founder of the Arrol-Johnston automotive works was born in West Linton in 1855.

Edinburgh Rugby and Scotland player Patrick Harrison was born and grew up in the village.

== Culture ==
=== Sport ===
The village is home to the football club Linton Hotspur, based at New Moor Road after its 2008 re-establishment. In 2023, the club was admitted to the Third Division of the East of Scotland Football League, and was promoted to the Second Division in the 2024-25 season with a second-place finish.

=== The Whipman Play ===
The Whipman Play is an annual summer festival held in the village, and is one of the Borders' oldest festivals the Whipman being the local man chosen as the focus of festivities. The festival commences on the Friday before the first Saturday in June, and runs until the following Saturday. The Whipman Play Society was formed in 1803 by local young men to alleviate hardship and illness for its members and in the community at large, 42 years before the Poor Law Amendment (Scotland) Act, 1845, and possibly before the first insurance company in Scotland.

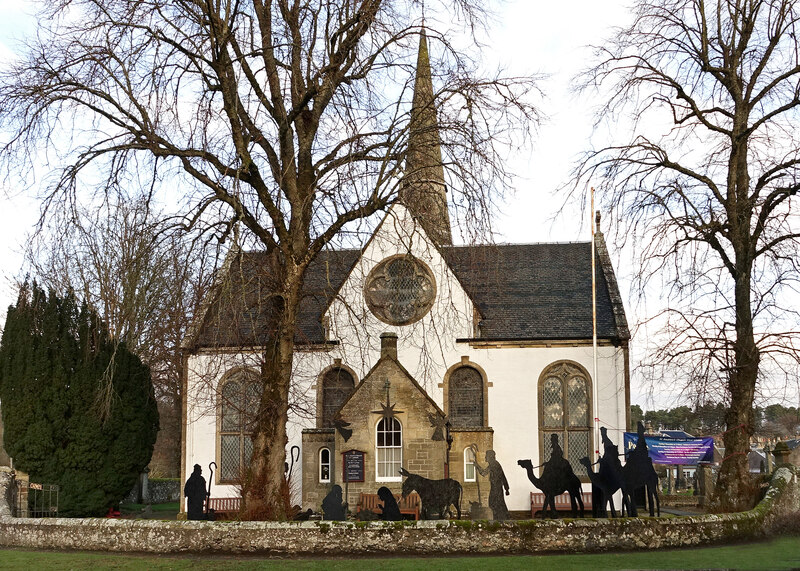
St Andrew's Church adorned with the silhouette statues, depicting the Nativity

Each year a local man is elected to the office of Whipman and he chooses the Whipman's Lass to assist him. These two represent the village at other Lothian and Borders festivals throughout their year in office. The celebrations begin with the Installation of the Whipman & Lass, followed by a celebratory ceilidh. The following day, the Ride Out (of around 80 to 100 horses) introduces the Whipman to the area, and a full week of events culminates in the annual sports day, held on the village green.

In 2020, the summer festival did not take place because of the COVID-19 pandemic. However, to mark the events, silhouette statues were erected around the village during the week, raising money for the Tiny Changes mental health charity in memory of musician Scott Hutchison, whose family live in the area.

== See also ==
- List of places in the Scottish Borders
- List of places in Scotland
