= Joseph Learmont =

- Military career
- Rank: Major
- Conflicts: Rullion Green; Bothwell Bridge

Major Joseph Learmont was major in the Scottish Covenanter army. He was a tailor before he began his military career. He was proprietor of the lands of Newholm, near Dolphinton, which lay partly in the shire of Peebles and partly in that of Lanark.

== Battles ==
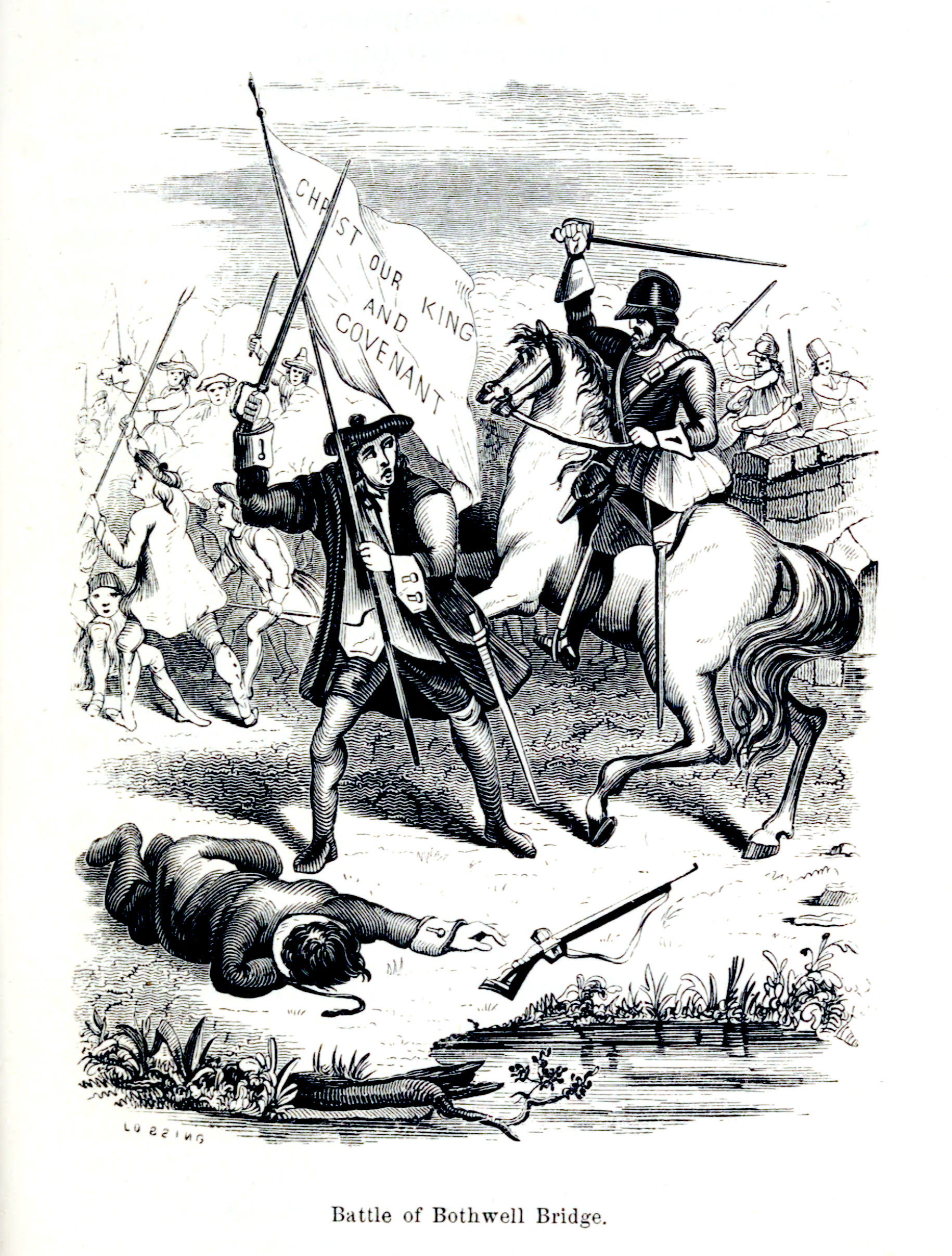
Battle of Bothwell Bridge

He was fined £1,200 Scots due to Middleton's Act of 1662 for having complied with Cromwell's forces. He was second in command, leading the Covenanters' horse on the left at Rullion Green in 1666. One source says he led the main attack "in which being unsuccessful, a rout ensued, but he managed to escape, along with William Veitch, a preacher, who afterwards wrote an account of the affair, and lived to be minister of Peebles." He also fought at Bothwell Bridge in 1679. In the year 1667 his whole fortune was forfeited for his being in the Pentland Hills insurrection. For the space of sixteen years thereafter, notwithstanding all the efforts made to find him, he remained undiscovered. He is recorded as spending some of the time in hiding in Ireland.

== Imprisonment ==
About the month of February 1682, he was taken prisoner and carried to Edinburgh, where, on 7 April that same year, he was sentenced to be executed. This sentence, however, by the interest of friends, was commuted into perpetual imprisonment in the Bass, to which he was sent on 13 May. He there remained close prisoner for five years.

== Release ==
Through the testimony of physicians that he was in a dying condition, he was liberated by the Council, upon giving bond that as soon as he recovered he would return to that place of confinement. But the Revolution taking place next year freed him from this obligation. He lived at his own house at Newholm some years after that memorable event, and died in peace in the 88th year of his age.

== Secret tunnel ==
A secret tunnel was found at his house.
