= Newbiggin =

Newbiggin may refer to several places in England:

in Cumbria

- Newbiggin, Ainstable
- Newbiggin, Dacre, 3 miles (5 km) west of Penrith
- Newbiggin, Furness
- Newbiggin, Hutton Roof, in the parish of Hutton Roof
- Newbiggin, Kirkby Thore, 6 miles (10 km) east of Penrith
- Newbiggin-on-Lune, near Kirkby Stephen

in Derbyshire

- Newbiggin, a former name of Biggin (Dovedale and Parwich Ward)

in County Durham

- Newbiggin, Lanchester
- Newbiggin, Teesdale

in North Yorkshire

- Newbiggin, Askrigg, on the north side of Wensleydale
- Newbiggin, south Wensleydale, on the south side of Wensleydale

in Northumberland

- Newbiggin-by-the-Sea

== See also ==
- Newbigging (disambiguation)
