= William Newbigging =

Scottish surgeon (1773–1852)

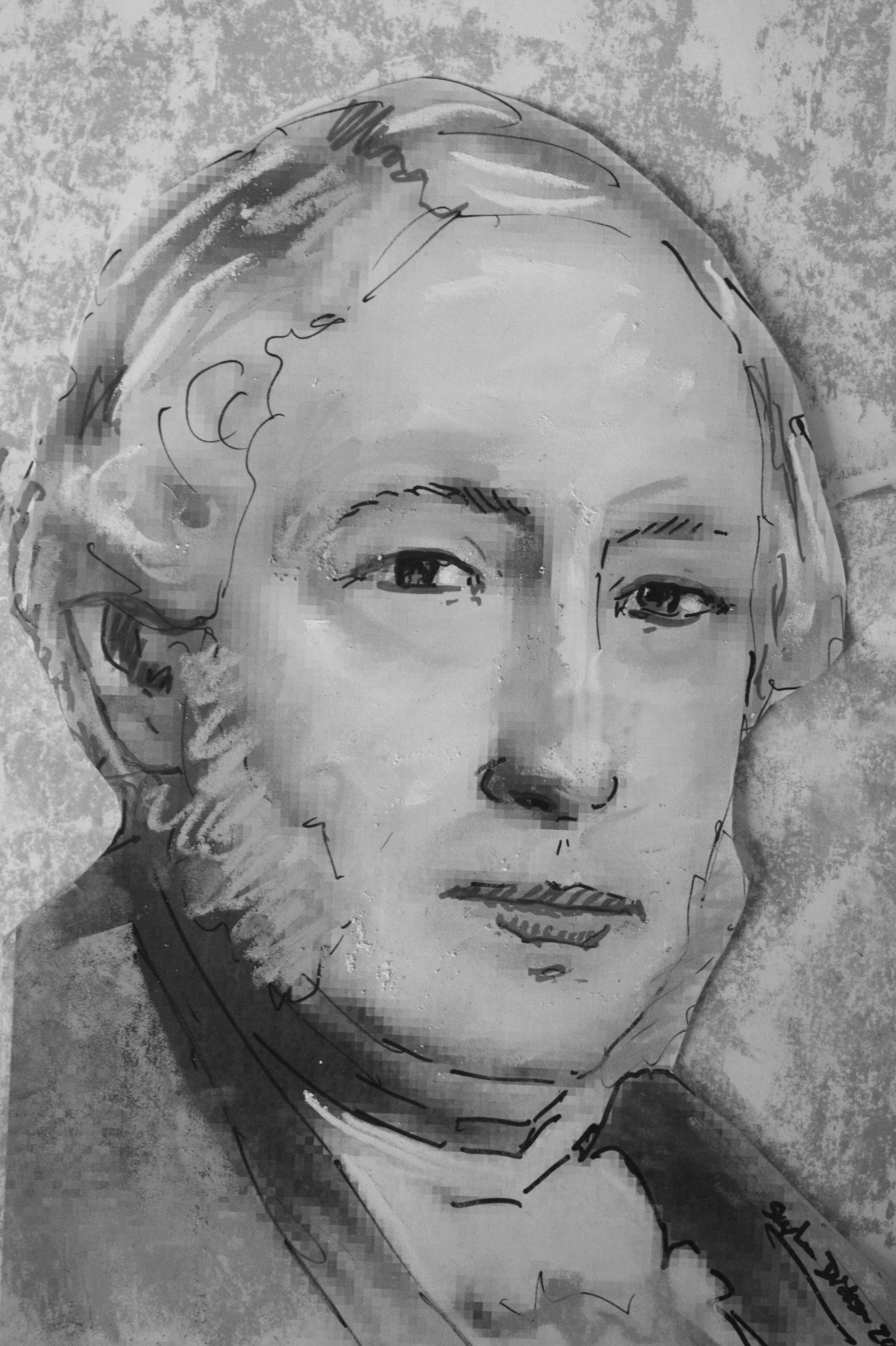
Sir William Newbigging

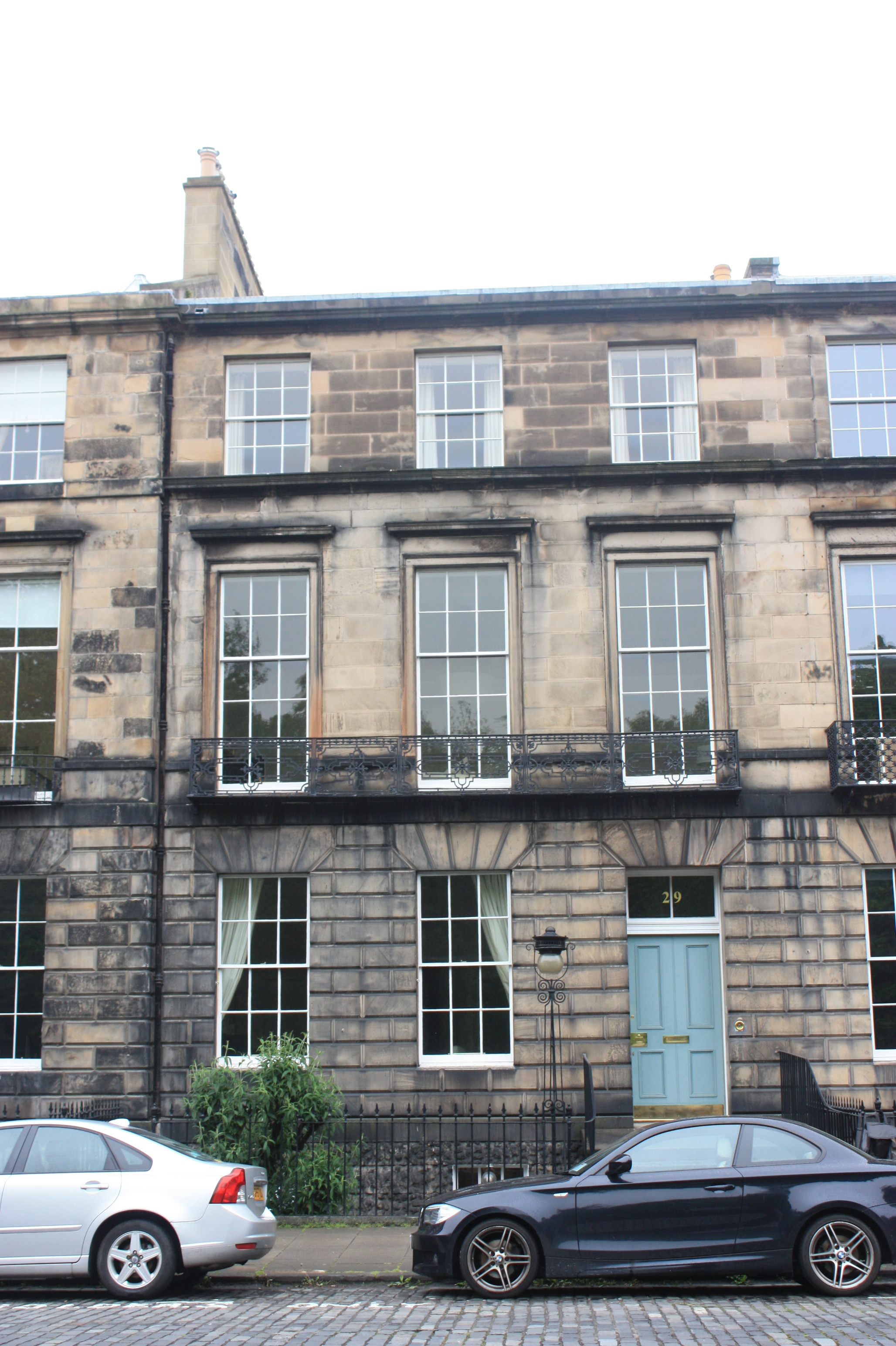
29 Heriot Row, Edinburgh

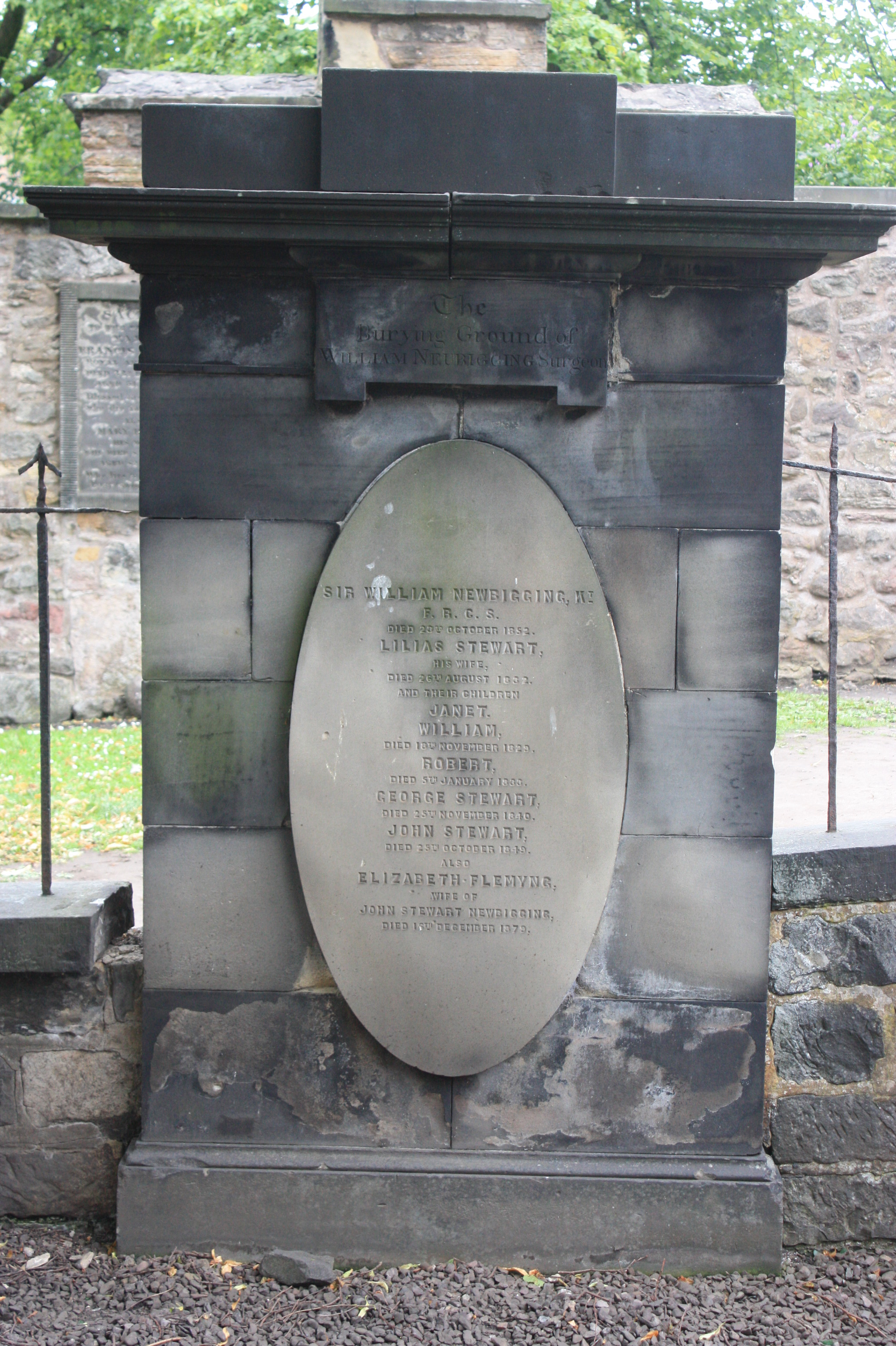
The grave of William Newbigging, Greyfriars Kirkyard, Edinburgh

Sir William Newbigging (25 April 1773 – 23 October 1852) was a Scottish surgeon who served as President of the Royal College of Surgeons of Edinburgh from 1814 to 1816. He was a keen amateur geographer.

== Life ==
He was born in Lanark in 1773 to Robert Newbigging and Jean Brownlee. He studied medicine at the University of Edinburgh and was apprenticed to Dr Forrest Dewar at Hunters Square, just off the Royal Mile, around 1790.

He was elected a Fellow of the Royal College of Surgeons of Edinburgh in 1799 and served as their President in 1814. He was elected a member of the Harveian Society of Edinburgh in 1815 and served as President in 1823 and 1838. He was elected a Fellow of the Royal Society of Edinburgh in 1824, his proposer was Robert Jameson. In 1833 he was elected a member of the Aesculapian Club. He was knighted by Queen Victoria in 1838.

He lived with his wife and family at 29 Heriot Row, in a large Georgian townhouse in the Edinburgh's New Town.

He died aged 79 on 23 October 1852 at 29 Heriot Row, Edinburgh, and is buried in Greyfriars Kirkyard in central Edinburgh in the western extension close to the grave of his colleague Dr John Gordon.

== Family ==
He married Lilias Stewart on 8 August 1801 at Corstorphine, Midlothian, Scotland. She died on 26 August 1832 in Edinburgh. Their many children included Patrick Newbigging, John Steuart Newbigging and Dr George Stewart Newbigging.

== Artistic recognition ==
He was painted by Sir John Watson Gordon in 1838. The painting hangs in the Royal College of Surgeons of Edinburgh. The painting was engraved by George Baird Shaw for multiple reproduction.
