= John Steuart Newbigging =

Scottish lawyer and legal author

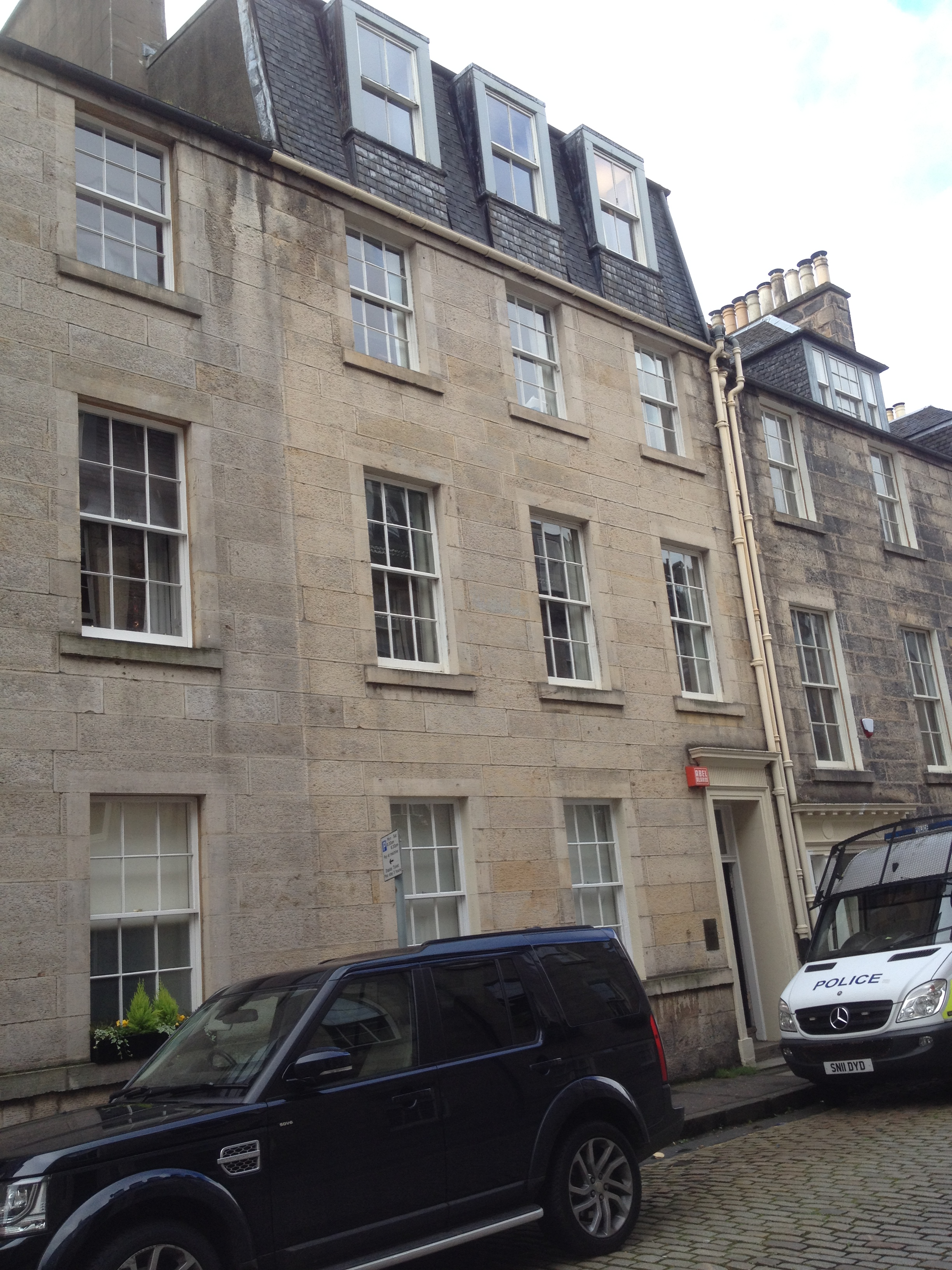
10 Hill Street, Edinburgh

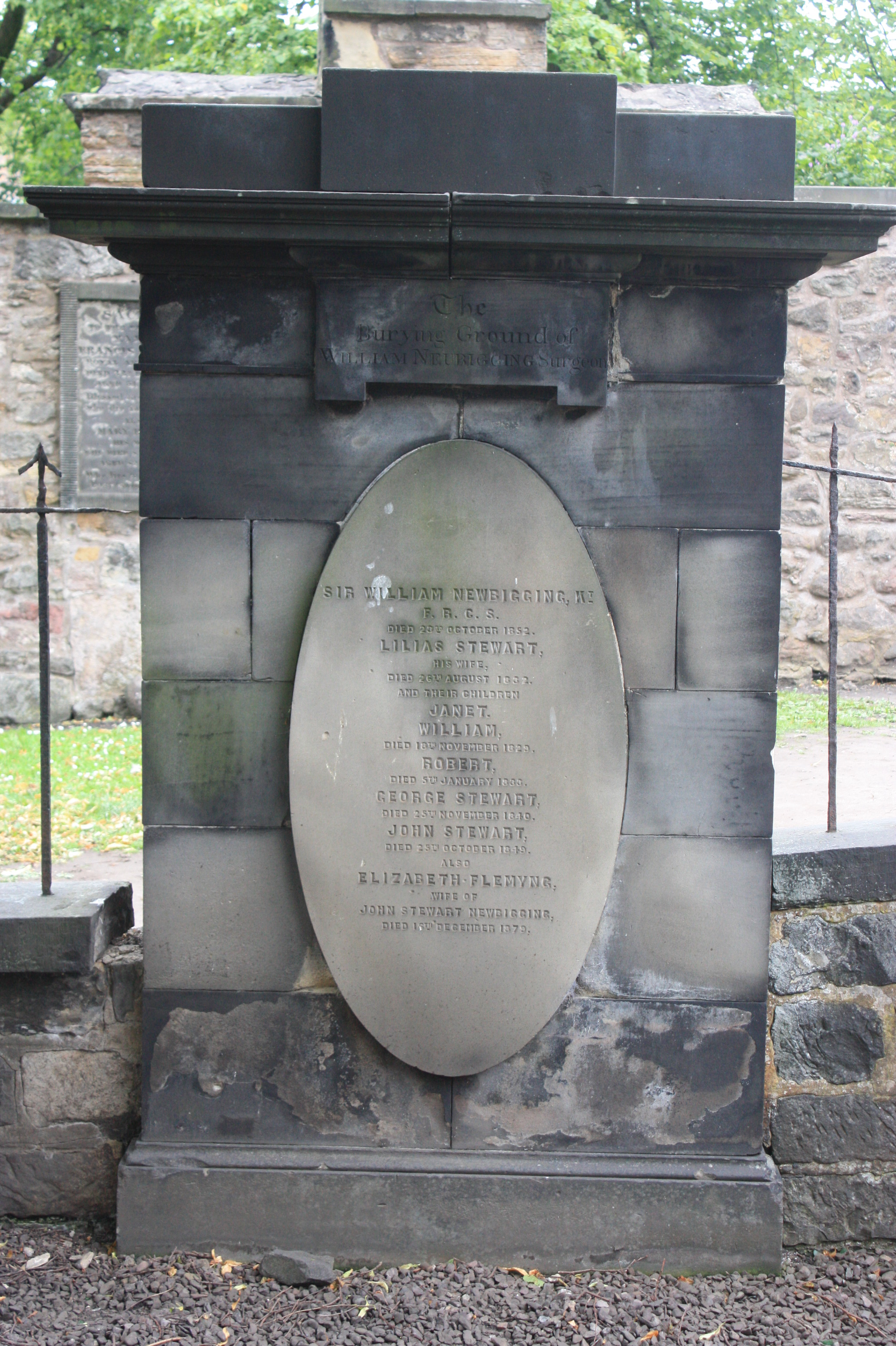
The grave of Patrick Steuart Newbigging, Greyfriars Kirkyard, Edinburgh

John Steuart Newbigging FRSE WS (1809 – 1849) was a short-lived Scottish lawyer and legal author. He was a Member of the Edinburgh Society of Arts.

== Life ==
He was born at 7 South St David Street in Edinburgh on 20 January 1809 the son of William Newbigging and his wife Lilias Steuart or Stewart.

By 1820 his family had moved to 18 St Andrew Square due to William's growing success as a surgeon.

Around 1823 John was apprenticed as a lawyer to Walter Dickson WS at 3 Royal Circus. He qualified as a Writer to the Signet in 1832.

He was elected a Fellow of the Royal Society of Edinburgh in 1834 his proposer being Robert Jameson. He became a member of the Highland Society in 1836.

From 1841 onwards he was Sheriff Clerk of Roxburghshire.

He died at home, 10 Hill Street on 25 October 1849 aged only 40. He is buried in the family plot in the western extension of Greyfriars Kirkyard.

== Family ==
He was brother to Patrick Newbigging.

In 1840 he was married to Elizabeth Flemyng (d.1879).
