= Jean Baptiste Barth =

French pathologist (1806–1877)

Jean Baptiste Philippe Barth (24 September 1806 – 20 November 1877) was a French pathologist who was a native of Sarreguemines.

He studied medicine at the University of Paris, and was afterwards an assistant to Pierre Charles Alexandre Louis (1787–1872) at the Hôpital de la Pitié. In 1840 he was appointed médecin des hôpitaux, and practiced medicine in Parisian hospitals for the next thirty years. In 1871 he was elected vice president of the Académie de Médecine, and soon afterwards became its president.

Jean Barth is remembered for treatises on auscultation that he co-authored with pediatrician Henri-Louis Roger (1809–1891). These include "A Manual of Auscultation and Percussion" and "A Practical Treatise on Auscultation"; both being translated into English.

== Associated eponym ==
- "Barth's hernia": A hernia of the loops of intestine between a persistent vitelline duct and the serosa of the abdominal wall.

== Bibliography ==
- "Jean Baptiste Philippe Barth". Who Named It. Archived from the original on November 16, 2007.
