= Dolphinton =

Coordinates: 55°42′19″N 3°25′34″W

- OS grid reference: NT098470
- Council area: South Lanarkshire
- Lieutenancy area: Lanarkshire
- Country: Scotland
- Sovereign state: United Kingdom
- Post town: WEST LINTON
- Postcode district: EH46
- Police: Scotland
- Fire: Scottish
- Ambulance: Scottish
- UK Parliament: Dumfriesshire, Clydesdale and Tweeddale
- Scottish Parliament: Clydesdale

Dolphinton is a village and parish in Lanarkshire, Scotland. It is located 7 miles (11 km) northeast of Biggar, 11 miles (18 km) northeast of Carstairs, 10 miles (16 km) southwest of Leadburn and 27 miles (43 km) southwest of Edinburgh, on the A702 road.

The local estate belonged in the 12th century to Dolfin, elder brother of the first Earl of Dunbar. The estate was owned in various forms by the Brown family from the sixteenth till the nineteenth centuries, when it passed to the McKenzie family by marriage.

The parish has an area of 3,581 acres (1,449 ha). It is bordered by the parishes of Linton and Kirkurd (Peeblesshire), Walston and Dunsyre.

== The Railway ==
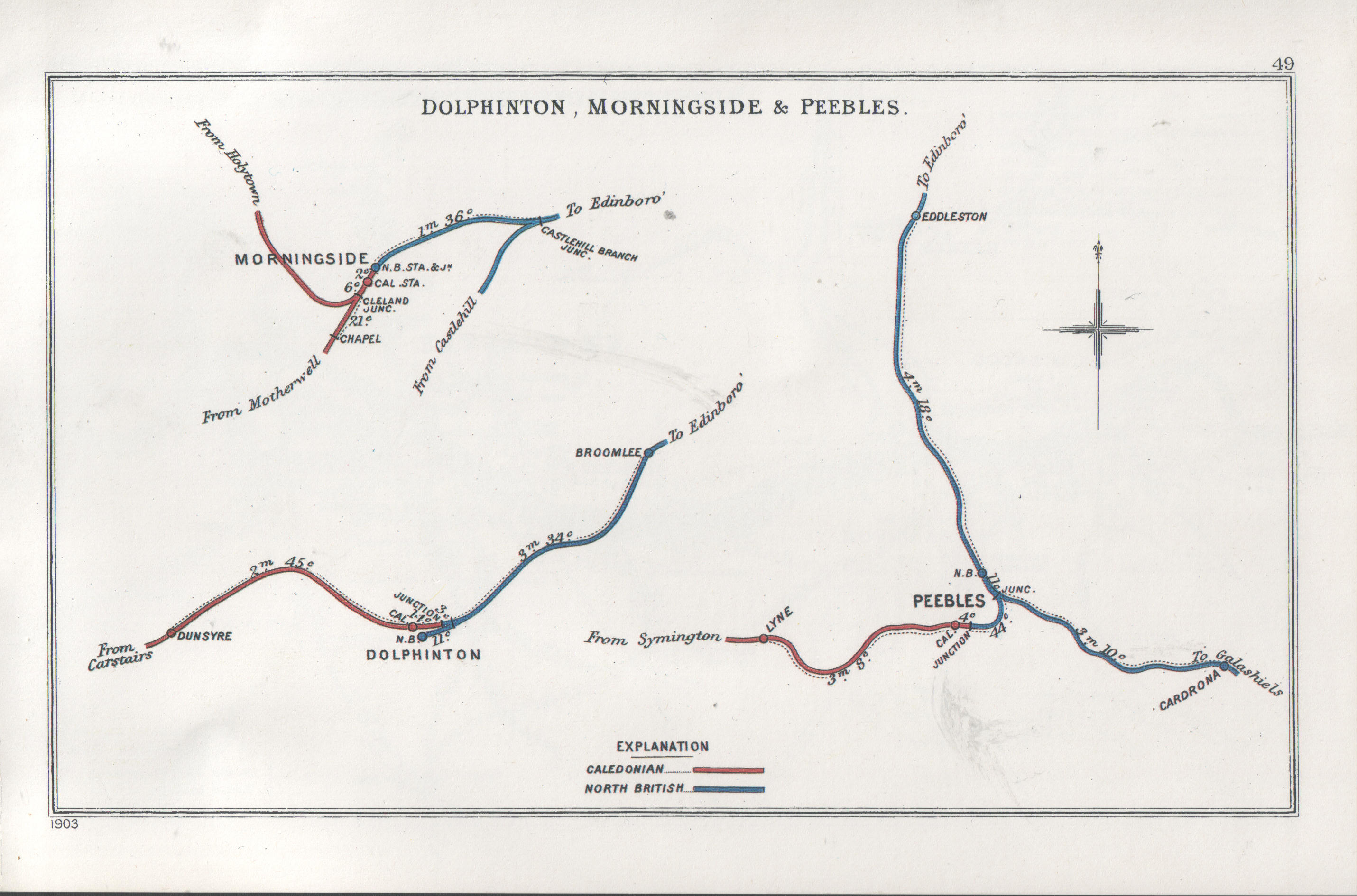
Dolphinton RJD 49

The village once had two railway termini, now long since closed. The Leadburn, Linton and Dolphinton Railway was the first to reach Dolphinton; the line, from the Peebles Railway at Leadburn, opened on 4 July 1864. In 1867, the Dolphinton Branch was opened, connecting Carstairs Junction to the Leadburn line at Dolphinton. The termini were apparently across the county boundary in Peebles-shire.

== Major Joseph Learmont ==
An example may partially survive of an escape or Ley Tunnel built in Covenanting times at the old house and estate of Newholm. This tunnel was built by Newholm's owner at the time, Major Joseph Learmont, a leading member of the Covenanter cause who fought at Rullion Green and Bothwell Bridge. He hid within the 40-yard (37 m) long stone lined tunnel when necessary and evaded capture for 16 years until traditionally said to have been betrayed by a maid servant in 1682. The stone lining was eventually used to build a walled garden; it had run from a cellar to a turf dyke in mossy ground. Remains of it may have been discovered in the 1960s, however details are sparse. The major was sentenced to death, however partly due to his advanced age he was sent to the Bass Rock before eventual release.
