= Newbigging, South Lanarkshire =

Coordinates: 55°41′47″N 3°34′09″W

Newbigging: Scots: Neebicken
- Location within South Lanarkshire
- OS grid reference: NT013458
- Council area: South Lanarkshire
- Lieutenancy area: Lanarkshire
- Country: Scotland
- Sovereign state: United Kingdom
- Post town: LANARK
- Postcode district: ML11
- Dialling code: 01555
- Police: Scotland
- Fire: Scottish
- Ambulance: Scottish
- UK Parliament: Dumfriesshire, Clydesdale and Tweeddale
- Scottish Parliament: Clydesdale

Newbigging (Scots: Neebicken) is a hamlet in South Lanarkshire, Scotland. It is near Dunsyre at the southern end of the Pentland Hills. It is on the A72 Carnwath to Peebles road.
